= Russian Revival architecture =

Late 19th-century Byzantine revivalist architectural style

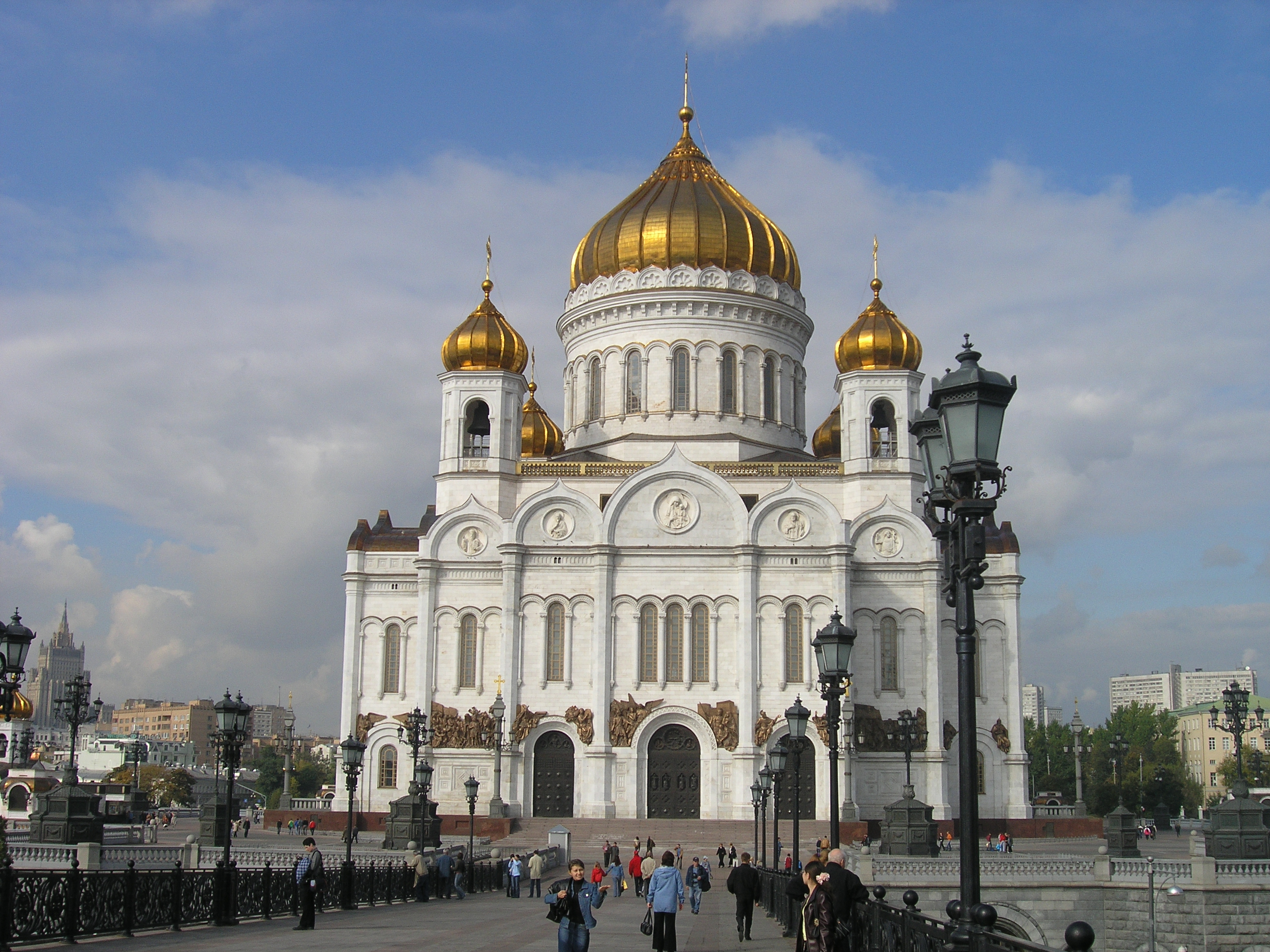
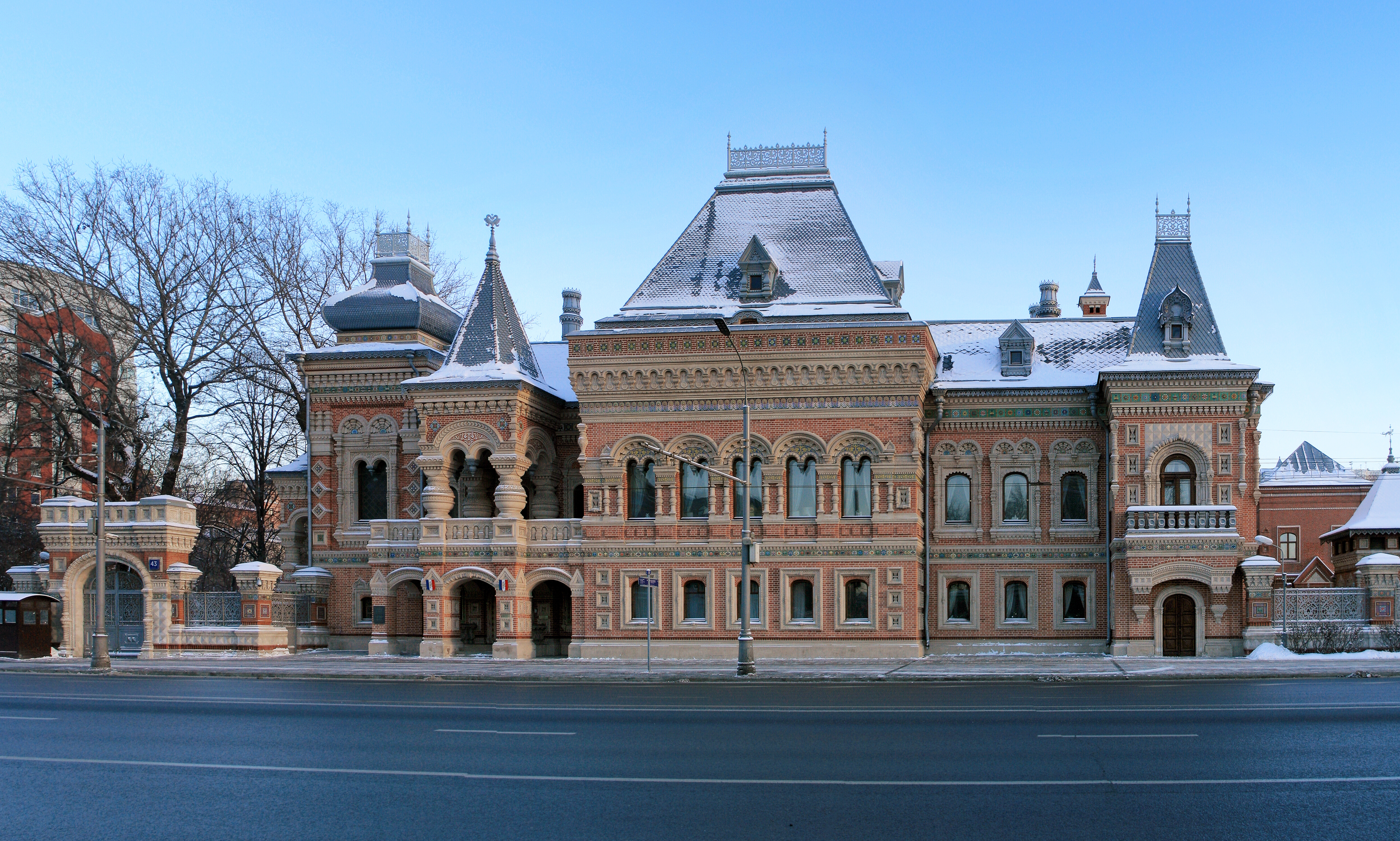
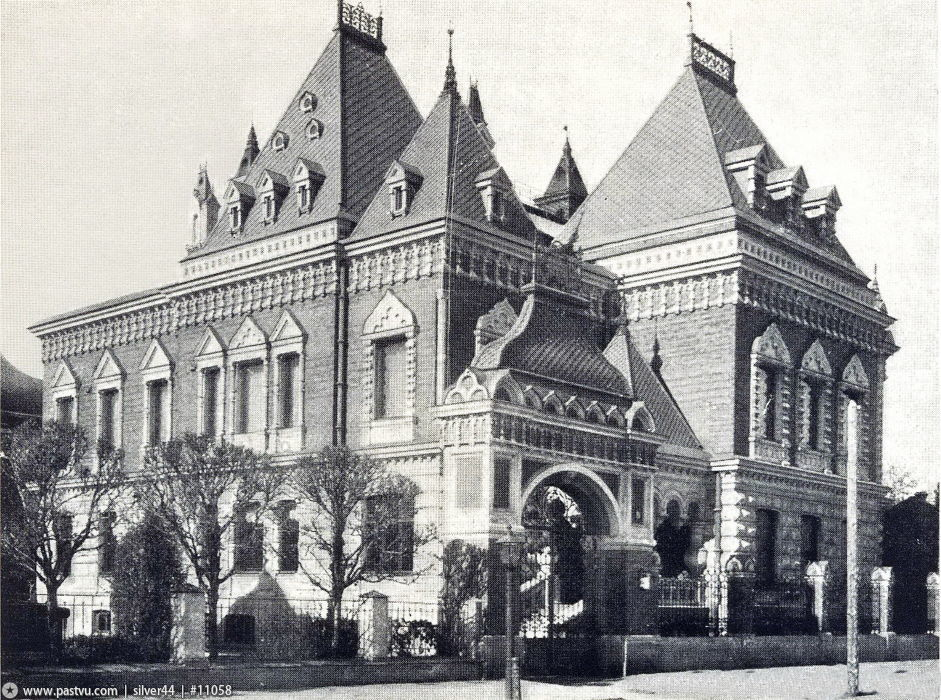
- Top: The Cathedral of Christ the Saviour from Moscow (original built 1839–1860, dynamited in 1931, rebuilt 1994–2000); Centre: The Igumnov House from Moscow (1883–1893); Bottom: The Timiryazev Museum from Moscow (1892–1905)
- Years active: Mid-19th – early 20th century
- Location: Russian Empire

The Russian Revival style (Note: Historiographical names are: Russian style (Russian: русский стиль, romanized: russky stil'); Pseudo-Russian style (псевдорусский стиль, prevdorussky stil'; Neo-Russian style (нео-русский стиль, neo-russky stil'); and Russian Byzantine style (русско-византийский стиль, russko-bizantiysky stil')) comprises a number of different movements within Russian architecture that arose in the second quarter of the 19th century and was an eclectic melding of Byzantine elements (Neo-Byzantine architecture in the Russian Empire) and pre-Petrine (Old Russian) architecture.

Russian Revival architecture arose within a framework of renewed interest in national architectures which occurred in Europe during the 19th century, and it is an interpretation and stylization of the Russian architectural heritage. Sometimes, Russian Revival architecture is often erroneously called Russian or Old-Russian architecture, but the majority of Revival architects did not directly reproduce the old architectural tradition. Being instead a skilful stylization, the Russian Revival style was consecutively combined with other international styles, from the architectural romanticism of first half of the 19th century to the style moderne.

== Cultural background ==
Like the Romantic revivals of Western Europe, the Russian Revival was informed by a scholarly interest in the historic monuments of the nation. The historicism resonated with the popular nationalism and pan-Slavism of the period. The first illustrated account of Russian architecture was the project of Anatoly Nikolaievich Demidov, 1st Prince of San Donato and French draughtsman André Durand, the record of their 1839 tour of Russia was published in Paris in the 1840s as Voyage Pittoresque et Archéologique en Russie. Durand's lithographs betray a foreigner's sensitivity to the seeming otherness of Russian architecture, displaying some curiously distorted features, and while they are, on the whole, fairly accurate representations, the folios that he produced belong to the genre of travel literature rather than historical inquiry.

The attempt to discern the chronology and development of Russia's building begins in earnest with Ivan Snegirev and A.A. Martynov's The old Russia in its ecclesiastical and civil architectural monuments («Русская старина в памятниках церковного и гражданского зодчества») (Moscow, 1851). The state took an interest in the endeavour by sponsoring a series of folios published as The antiquities of the realm of Russia («Древности российского государства») (Moscow 1849–1853, 6 vol.) depicting antiquities and decorative works of art. By this time the Moscow Archaeological Society undertook research on the subject, formalising it as a field of study. A series of triennial conferences was instituted from 1869 to 1915, and its reports included studies of the architecture of the Kievian Rus' and early Moscow periods. Perhaps the Society's most significant achievement was the publication of the Proceedings of the Commission on conservation of the old monuments («Труды Комиссии по сохранению древних памятников») in 6 volumes between 1907 and 1915. Also, the St. Petersburg Academy of fine Arts commissioned research from V.V. Suslov in the form of his two multi-volume works The monuments of the old Russian architecture («Памятники древнего русского зодчества») (1895–1901, 7 vol.) and The monuments of the old Russian art («Памятники древнерусского искусства») (1908–1912, 4 vol.). With the application of positivist historical principals the chronology of Russian architecture was firmly established by the time of the publication of that definitive 6-volume survey of Russian art The Russian art history («История русского искусства») (1909–1917), edited by Igor Grabar; the appearance of the final volume was, however, interrupted by the Russian Revolution.

Neo-Russian style examples
Church of the Savior on Blood in Central Saint Petersburg

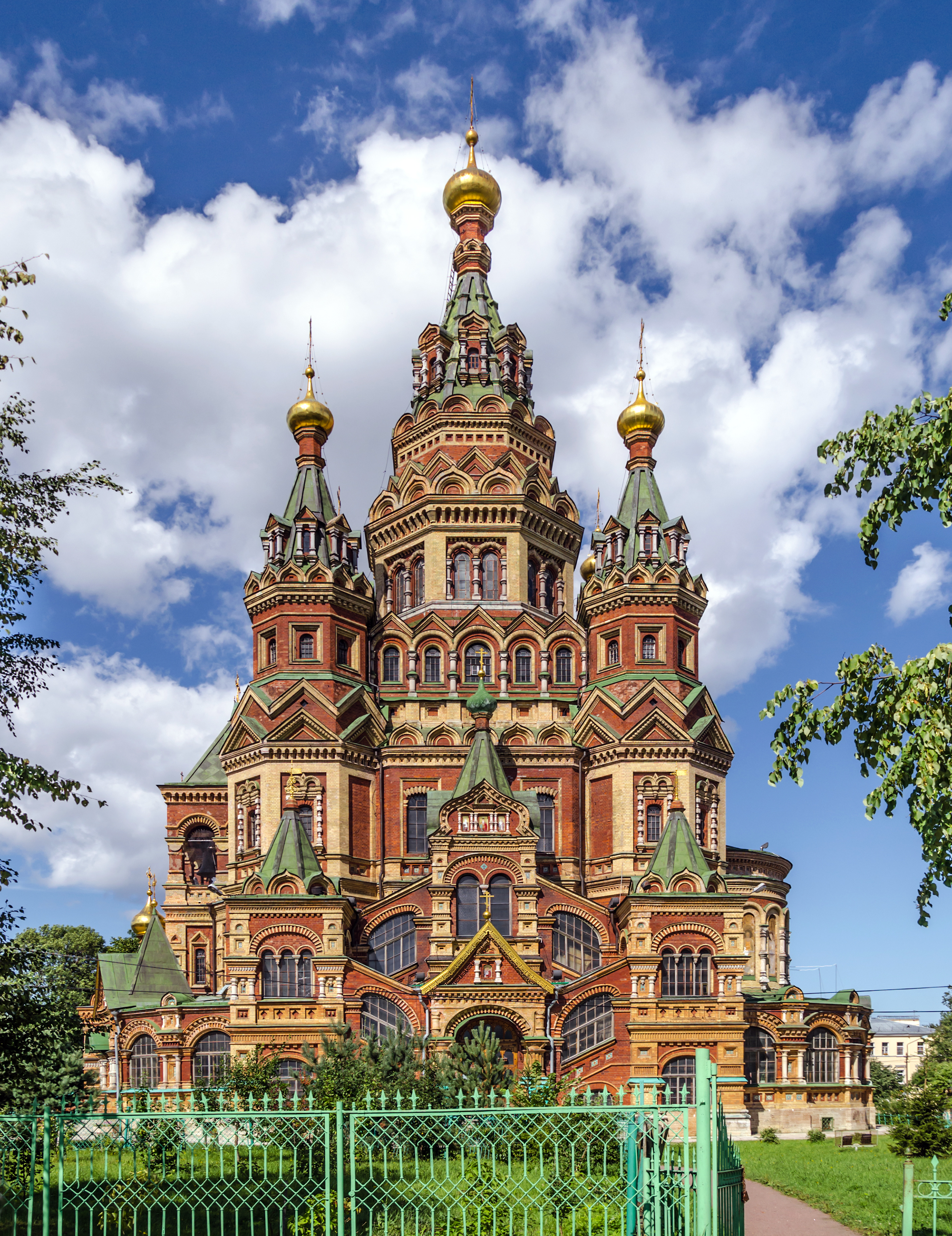
Cathedral of Saints Peter and Paul in Petergof, Saint Petersburg

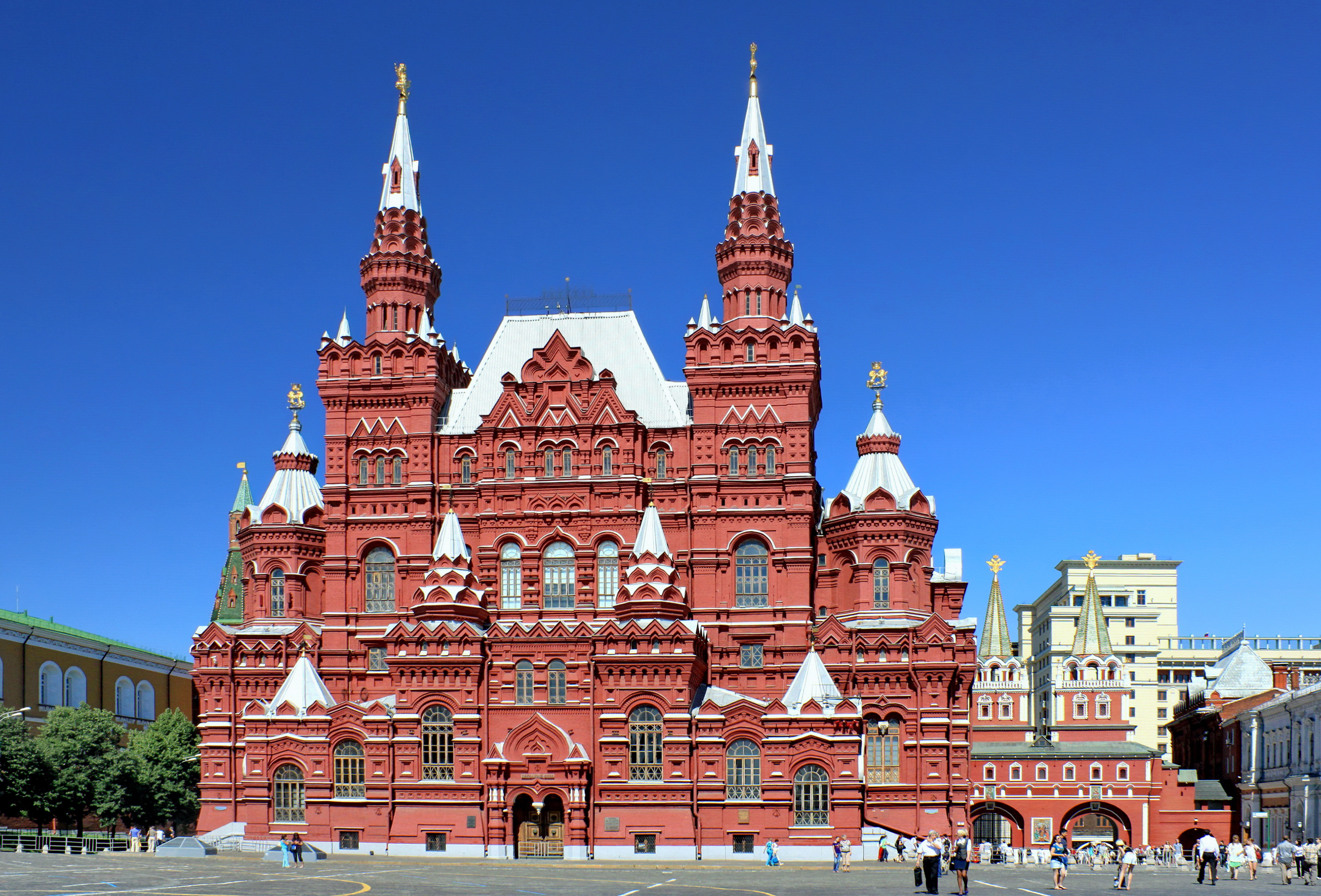
State Historical Museum in Moscow

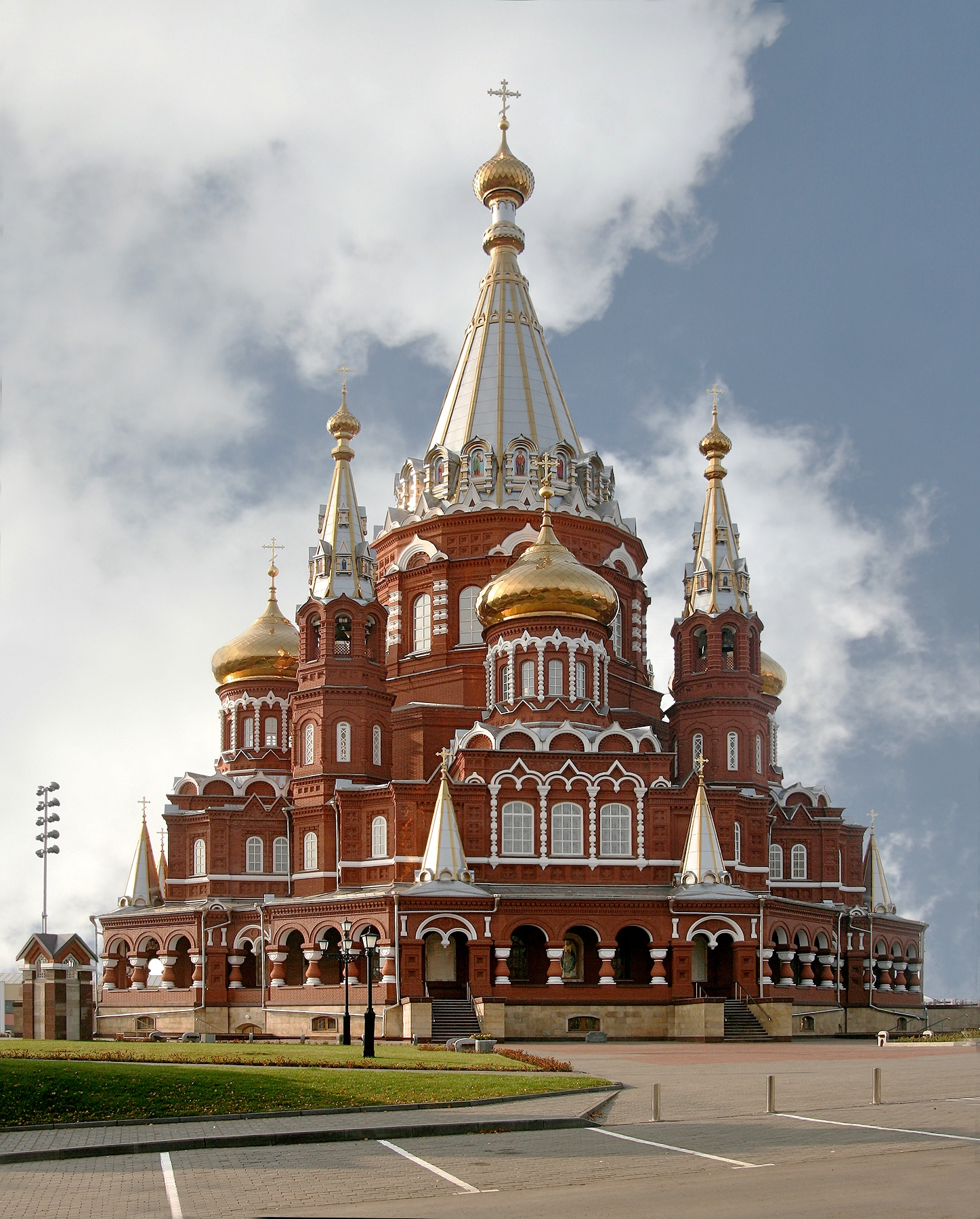
St. Michael's Cathedral in Izhevsk

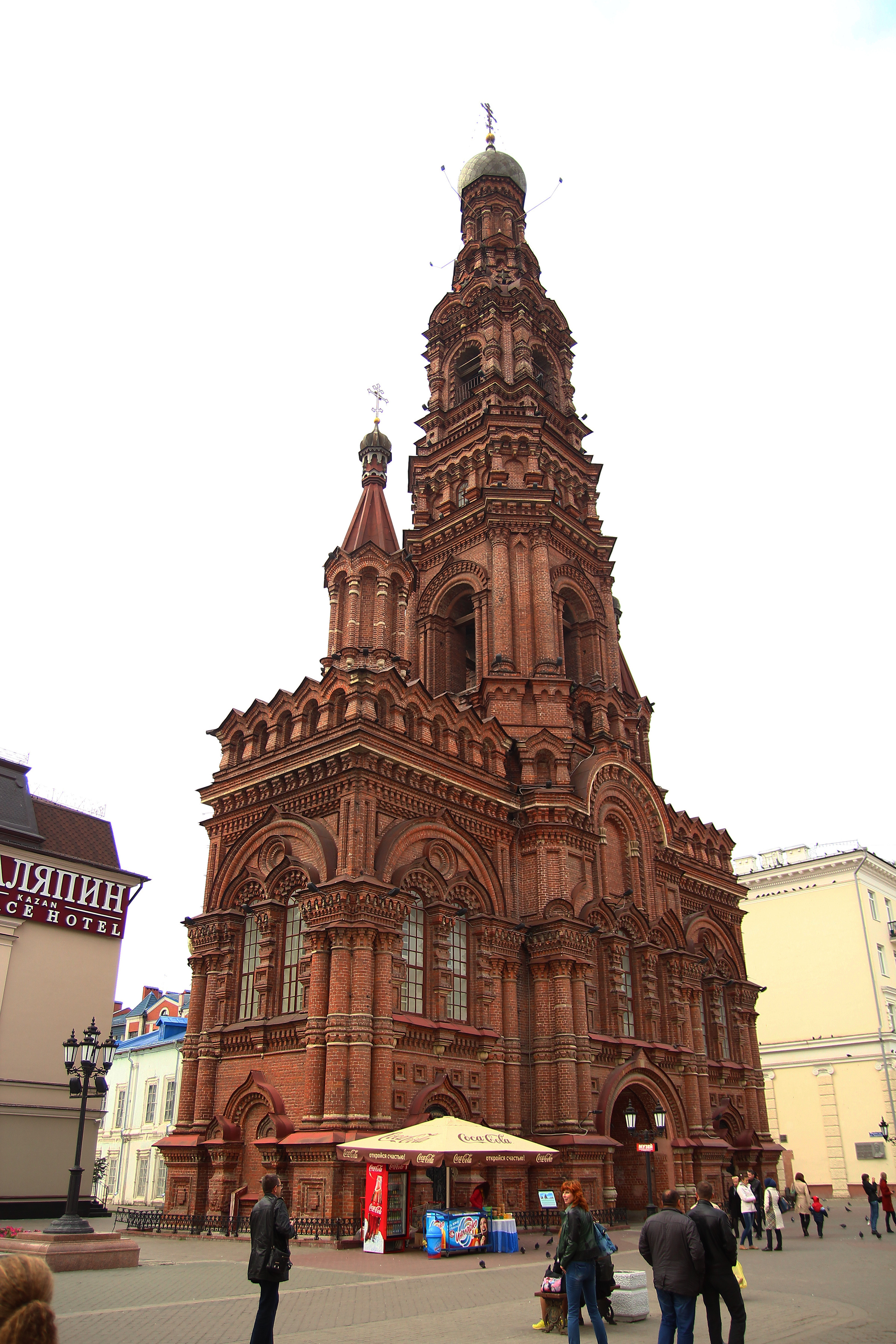
Bell tower of the Epiphany Cathedral in Kazan, Tatarstan

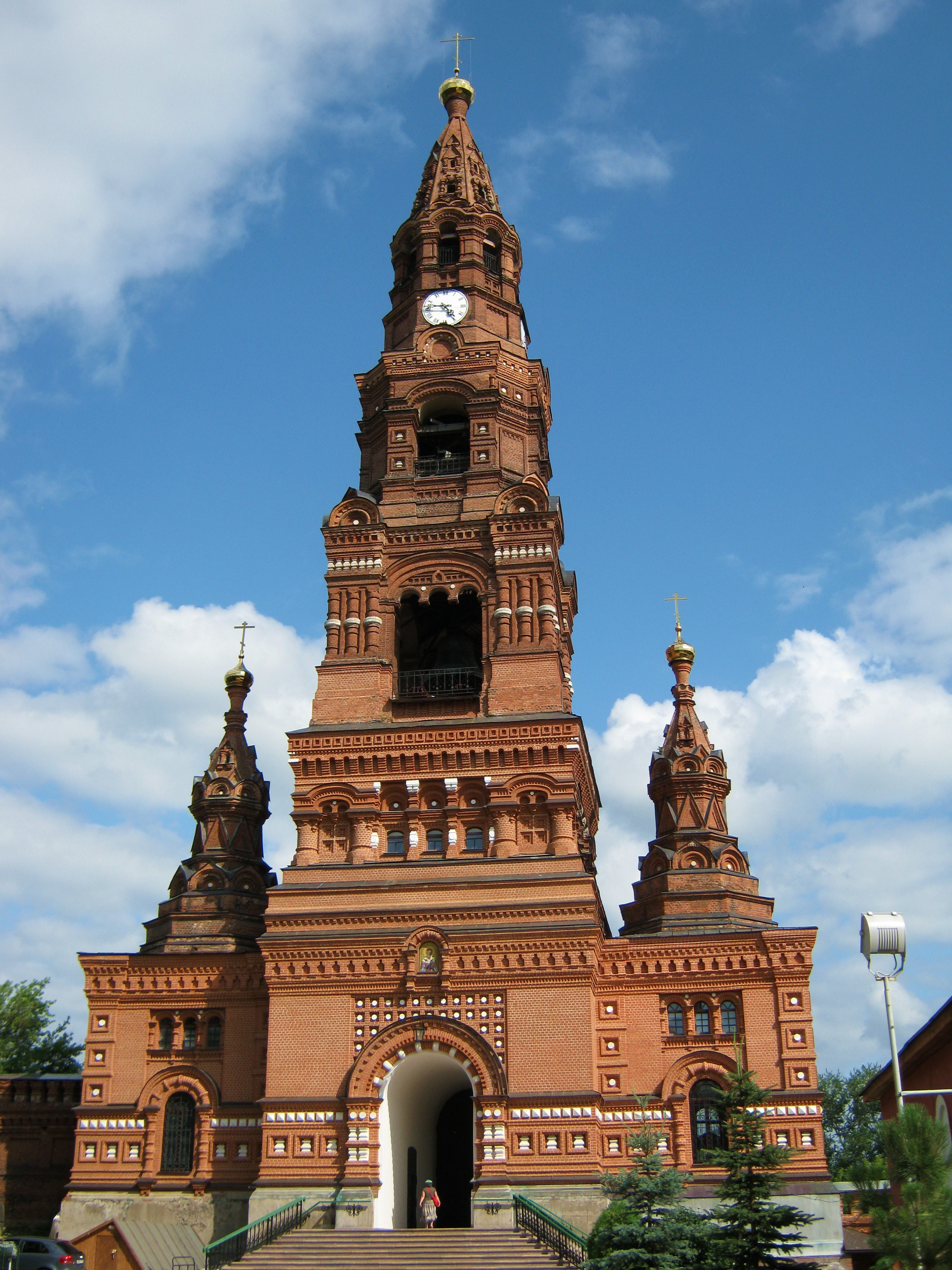
Chernigovsky skete in Sergiyev Posad

== Development ==
=== 1825–1850 ===
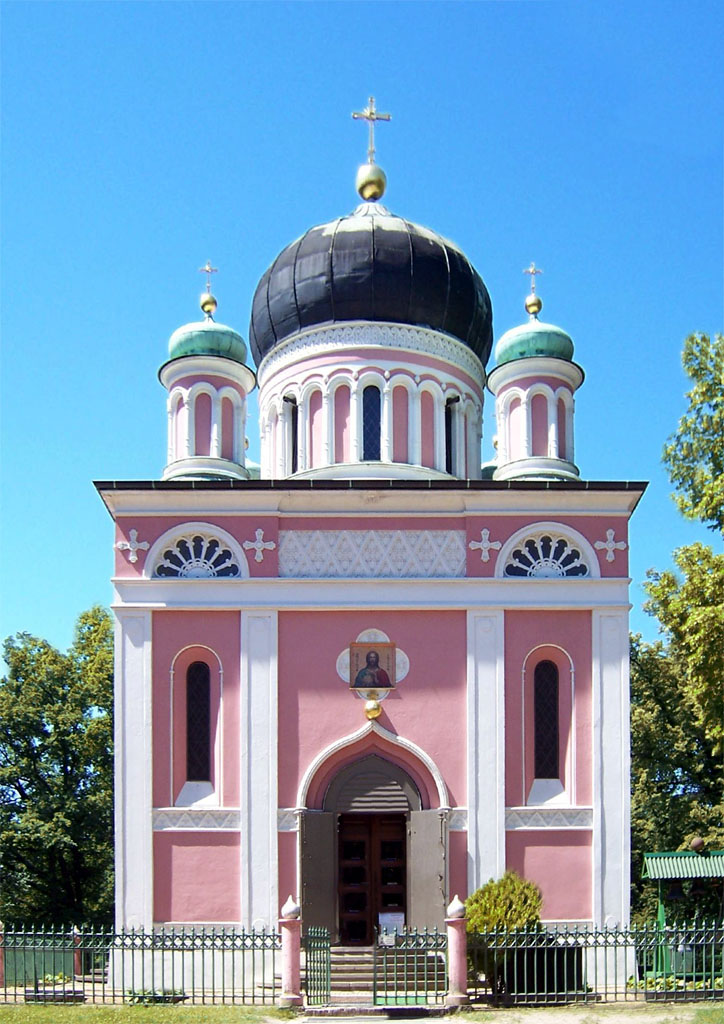
The oldest statement of Russian Revival, 1826 Alexander Nevsky Memorial Church in Potsdam

The first extant example of Byzantine Revival in Russian architecture and the first example ever built stands in Potsdam, Germany, the five-domed Alexander Nevsky Memorial Church by Vasily Stasov (builder of neoclassical Trinity Cathedral, St. Petersburg, father of critic Vladimir Stasov). The following year, Stasov completed the larger five-domed Church of the Tithes in Kiev.

The Russo-Byzantine idea was carried forward by Konstantin Thon with the firm approval by Nicholas I. Thon's style embodied the idea of continuity between Byzantium and Russia, perfectly matching the ideology of Nicholas I. Russian-Byzantine architecture is characterised by mixing the composition methods and vaulted arches of Byzantine architecture with ancient Russian exterior ornaments, and were vividly realised in Thon's 'model projects'. In 1838, Nicholas I "pointed out" Thon's book of model designs to all architects; more enforcement followed in 1841 and 1844. Buildings designed by Thon or based on Thon's designs were Cathedral of Christ the Saviour, the Grand Kremlin Palace and the Armoury in Moscow, also cathedrals in Sveaborg, Yelets, Tomsk, Rostov-on-Don and Krasnoyarsk.

Official enforcement of Byzantine architecture was, in fact, very limited: it applied only to new church construction and, to a lesser extent, to royal palaces. Private and public construction proceeded independently. Thon's own public buildings, like the pseudo-Renaissance Nikolaevsky Terminal, lack any Byzantine features. A closer look at churches constructed in Nicholas' reign reveals many first-rate neoclassical buildings, like the Elokhovo Cathedral in Moscow (1837–1845) by Yevgraph Tyurin. Official Byzantine art was not absolute in Nicholas reign; it is scarce in our days, as the Byzantine churches, declared 'worthless' by Bolsheviks, were the first to be demolished in the Soviet era.

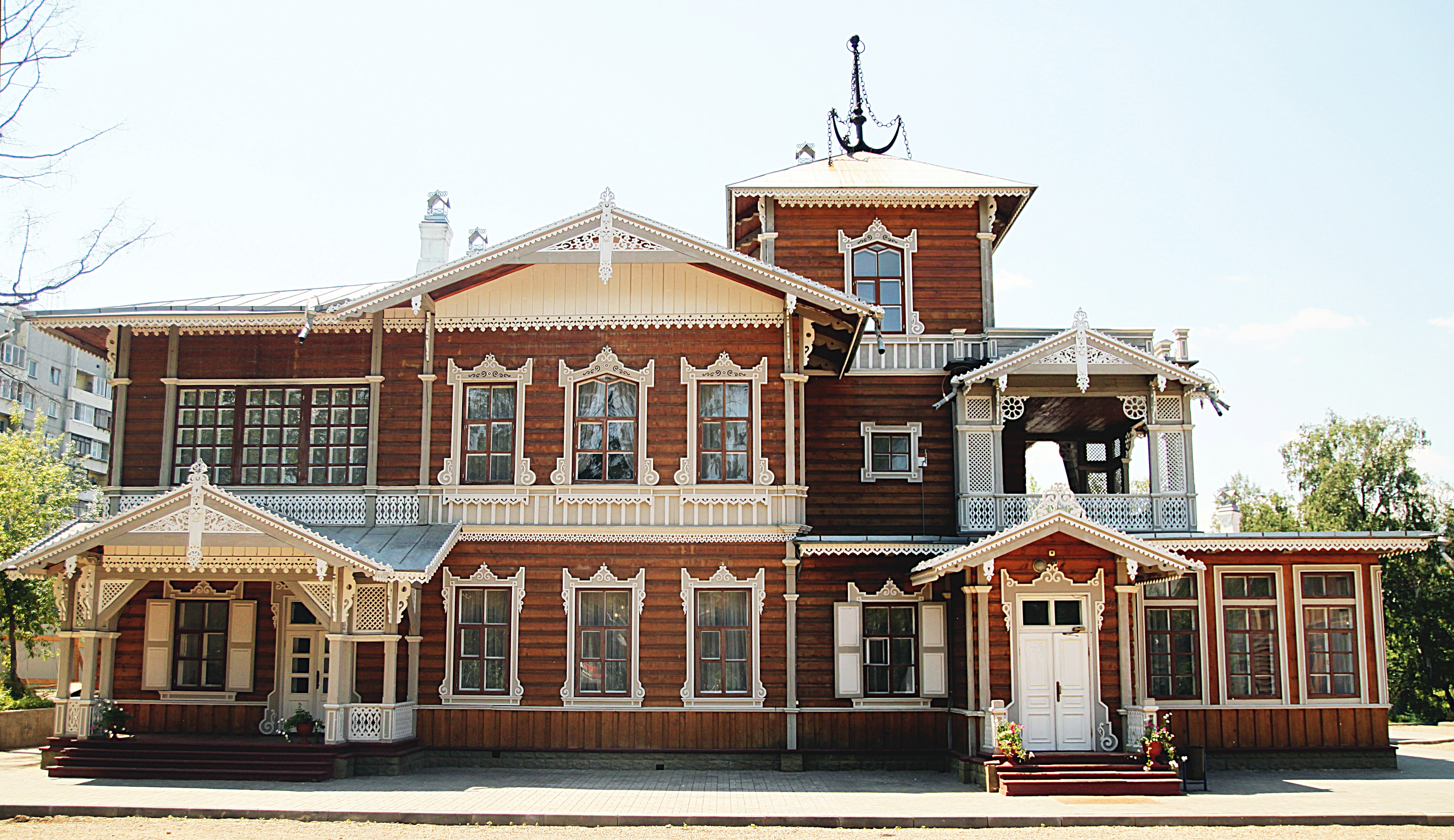
Sukachev's Cottage, Irkutsk

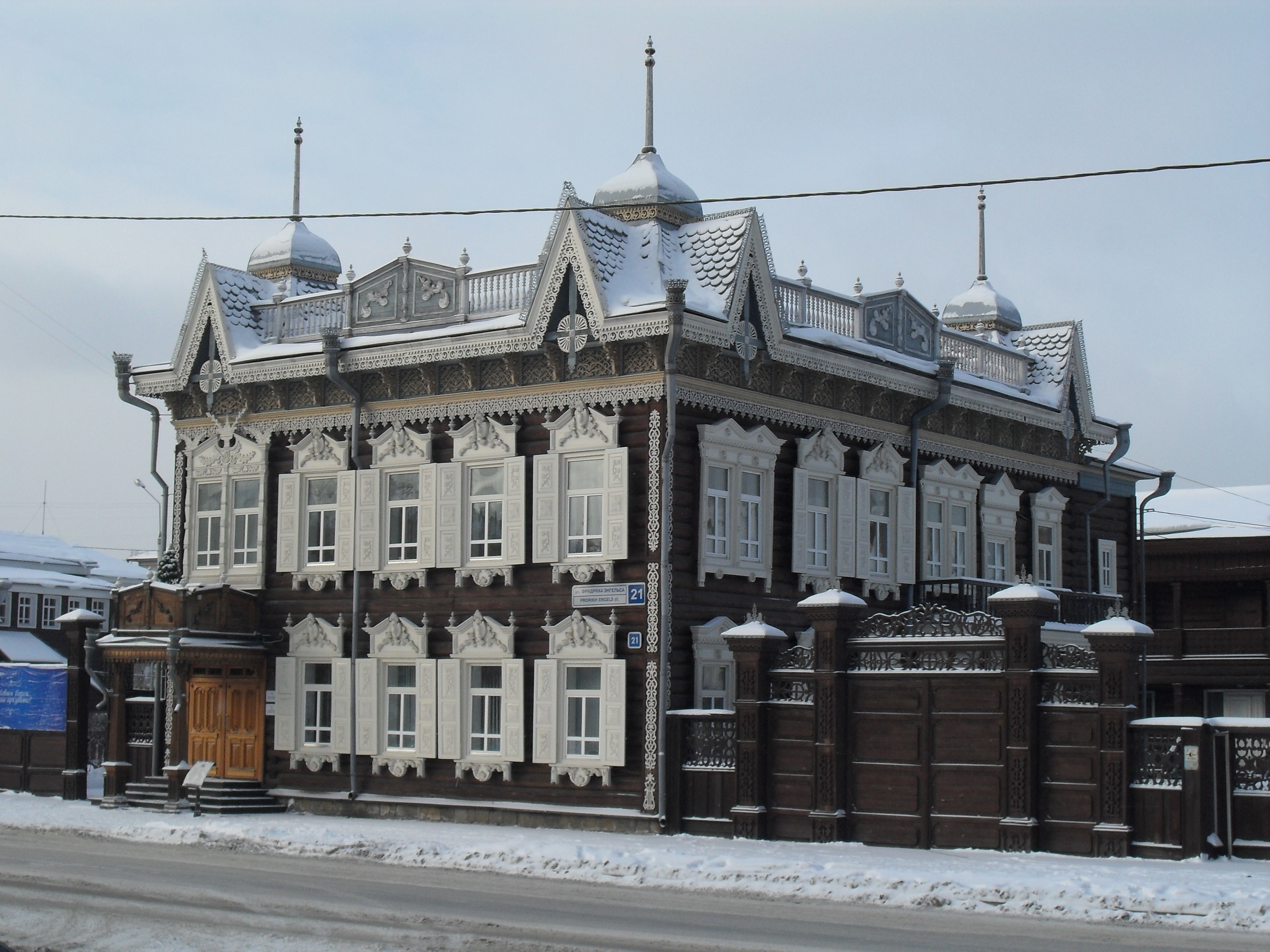
Lace House, Irkutsk

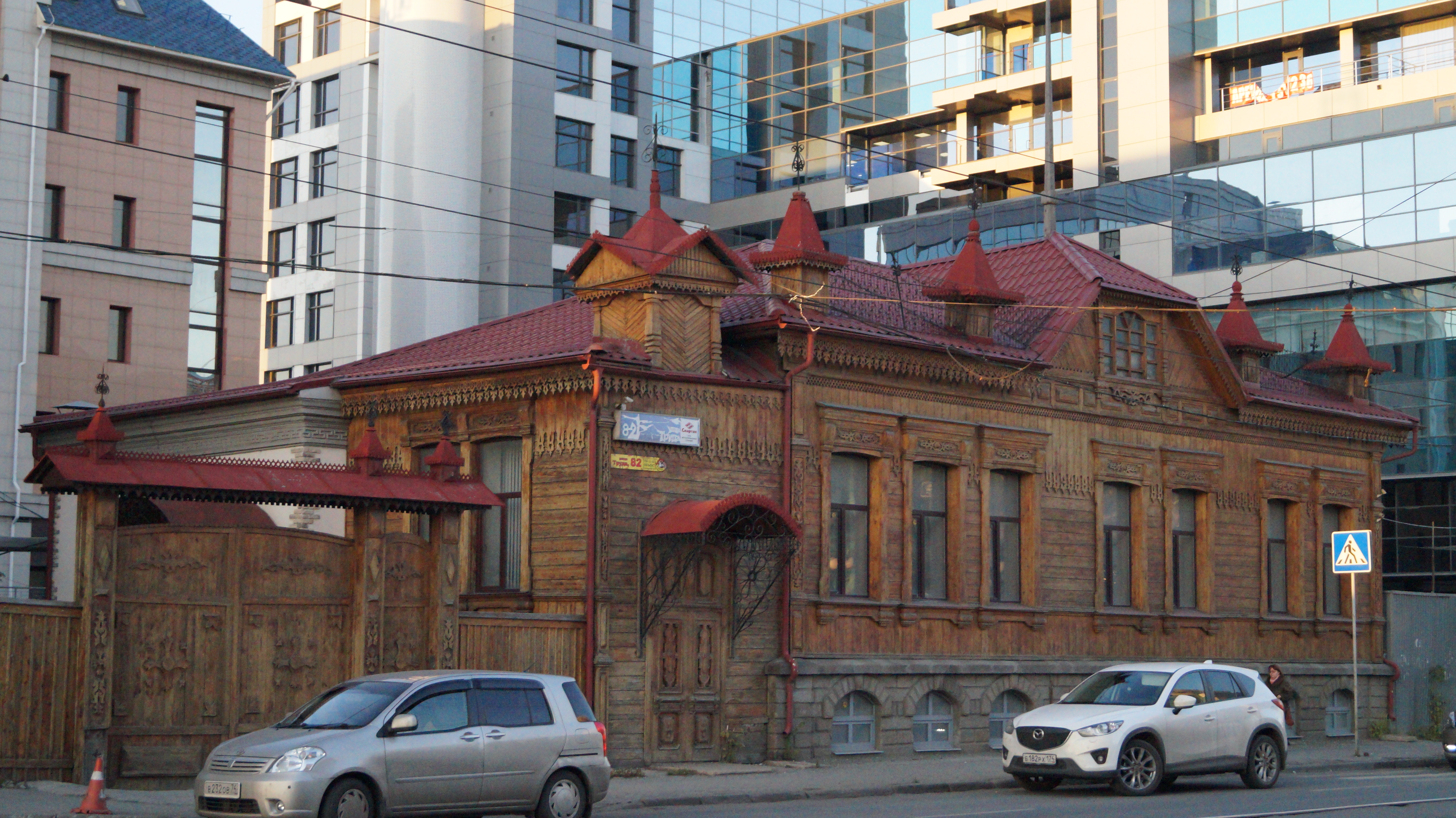
Stepanov Bros. Cottage, Chelyabinsk

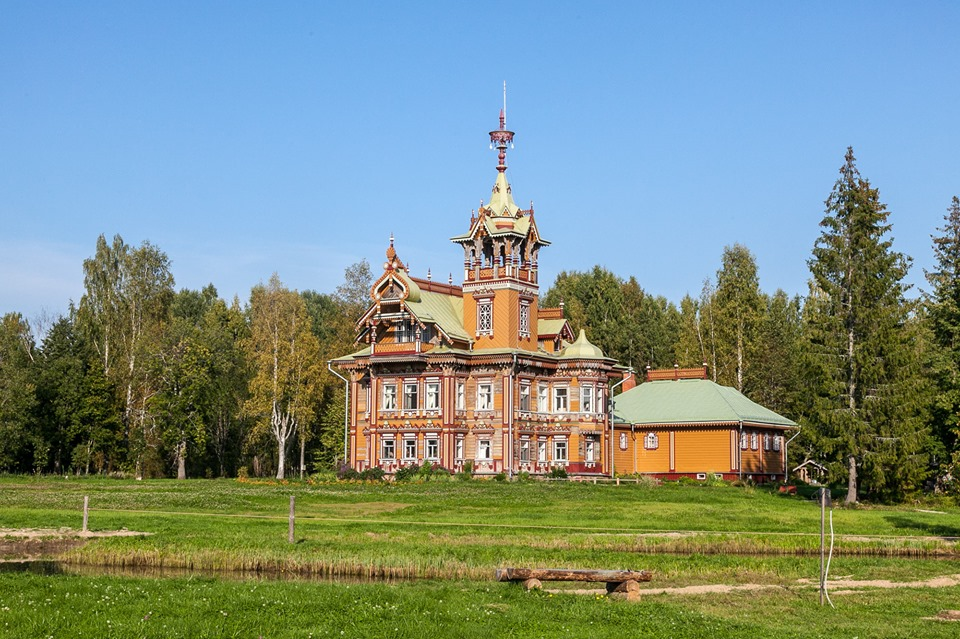
Terem Astashovo, Kostroma

=== 1850s ===
Another direction taken by the Russian Revival style was a reaction against official Thon art, influenced by Romanticism, Slavophilism and detailed studies of vernacular architecture. The forerunner of this trend in church design was Alexey Gornostaev (in his later years, 1848–1862), notable for reinventing Northern Russian tented roof motif augmented with Romanesque and Renaissance vault structure. An early extant example in civil architecture is the wooden Pogodinsky Cottage in Devichye Pole, Moscow, by Nikolai Nikitin (1856).

=== Post-1861 ===
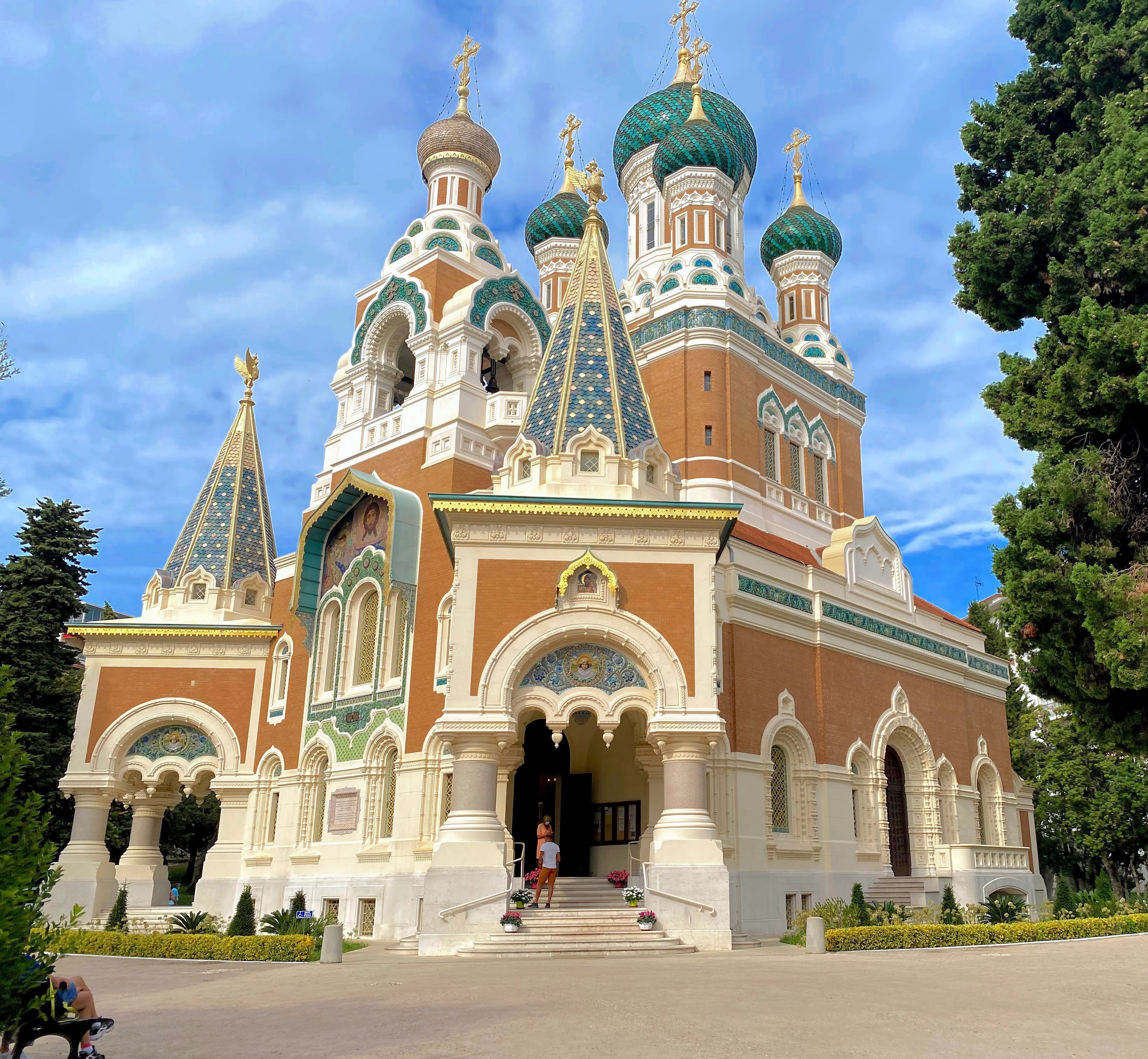
Russian style Orthodox Cathedral in Nice, France

The Emancipation reform of 1861 and subsequent reforms of Alexander II pushed the liberal elite into exploring the roots of national culture. The first result of these studies in architecture was a birth of "folk" or Pseudo-Russian style, exemplified by 1870s works of Ivan Ropet (Terem in Abramtsevo, 1873) and Viktor Hartmann (Mamontov printing house, 1872). These artists, in alliance with Narodnik movement, idealized the peasant life and created their own vision of "vernacular" architecture. Another factor was the rejection of western eclecticism that dominated civil construction of the 1850s–1860s, a reaction against "decadent West", pioneered by influential critic Vladimir Stasov.

Ivan Zabelin, a theorist of the movement, declared that "Russian Khoromy, grown naturally from peasants' log cabins, retained the spirit of beautiful disorder... Beauty of a building is not in its proportions, but on the contrary, in the difference and independence of its parts" ("русские хоромы, выросшие органически из крестьянских клетей, естественно, сохраняли в своем составе облик красивого беспорядка... По понятиям древности первая красота здания заключалась не в соответствии частей, а напротив в их своеобразии, их разновидности и самостоятельности"). As a result, "ropetovschina", as Ropet's foes branded his style, concentrated on hoarding together vivid but not matching pieces of vernacular architecture, notably high-pitched roofs, barrel roofs and wood tracery. Wood was the preferred material, since many fantasies could not be physically built in masonry. This was good and bad for "dopetovschina". Bad, because wooden structures, especially those unconventionally shaped, were not scalable and had a very short life span. Very few survive to date. Good, because speed of construction and unorthodox looks were a perfect match for exhibition pavilions, coronation stands and similar short-term projects. The trend continued into 20th century (Fyodor Schechtel) and 1920s (Ilya Golosov).

For a short time in the 1880s, a less radical version of Pseudo-Russian style, based on copying 17th century brick architecture, almost succeeded as the new official art. These buildings were built, as a rule, from the brick or whitestone, with the application of modern construction technology they began to be abundantly decorated in the traditions of Russian popular architecture. The characteristic architectural elements of this time, such as "pot-bellied" columns, low arched ceilings, narrow window-loop holes, tented roofs, frescoes with floral designs, use of multicolored tiles and massive forging, are manifest both in the external and in the internal decoration of these structures. A typical example is the Historical Museum (1875–1881, architect Vladimir Sherwood) which completed the ensemble of Red Square.

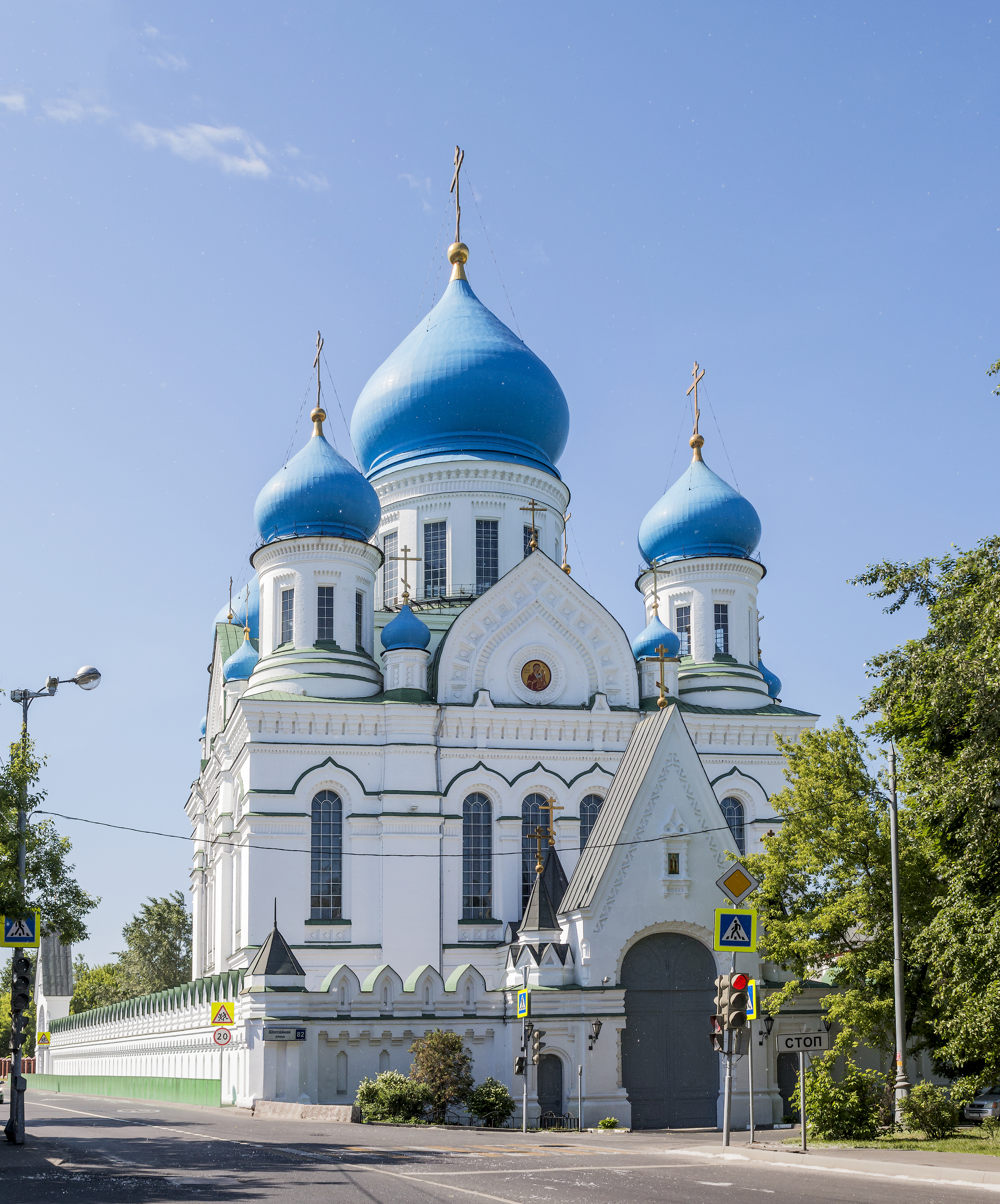
Our Lady of Iveron Cathedral, Pererva (now Moscow)

=== 1898–1917 ===
At the turn of the centuries, the Russian Orthodox Church experienced a new trend; construction of unusually large cathedrals in working-class suburbs of big cities. Some, like Dorogomilovo Ascension Cathedral (1898–1910), rated for 10,000 worshippers, were launched in quiet country outskirts that increased in population by the time of completion. Christian theorists explain the choice of such remote locations with the desire to extend the reach of Church to working class, and only working class, in the time when wealthier classes stepped away from it. Byzantine architecture was a natural choice for these projects. It was a clear statement of national roots, against the modern European heresies. It was also much cheaper than grand Neoclassical cathedrals, both in initial costs and subsequent maintenance. The largest examples of this type were all completed after the Russian Revolution of 1905:

- Dorogomilovo Cathedral, Moscow, 1898–1910
- Our Lady of Iveron Cathedral in Nikolo-Perervinsky Monastery Cathedral, Pererva (now Moscow) 1904–1908
- Kronstadt Naval Cathedral, 1908–1913

=== 1905–1917 ===
- Rogozhskoye Cemetery belltower by Fyodor Gornostaev, 1908–1913
- Balakovo church by Fyodor Schechtel, 1909–1912
- Emperor railway station in Pushkin town, 1912
- St.Nicholas church by Belorusskaya Zastava in Moscow, 1914–1921

=== Gallery ===
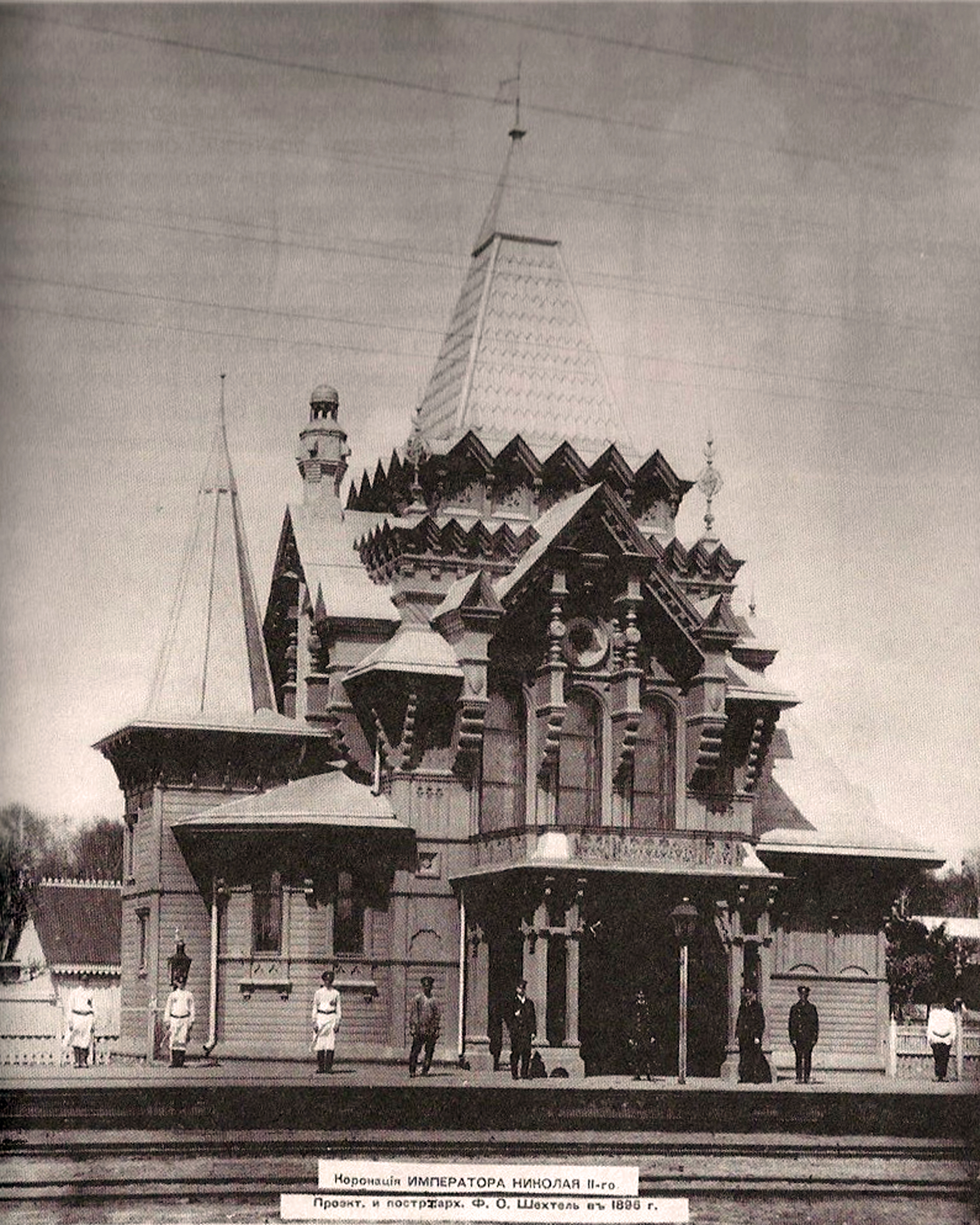
Odintsovo

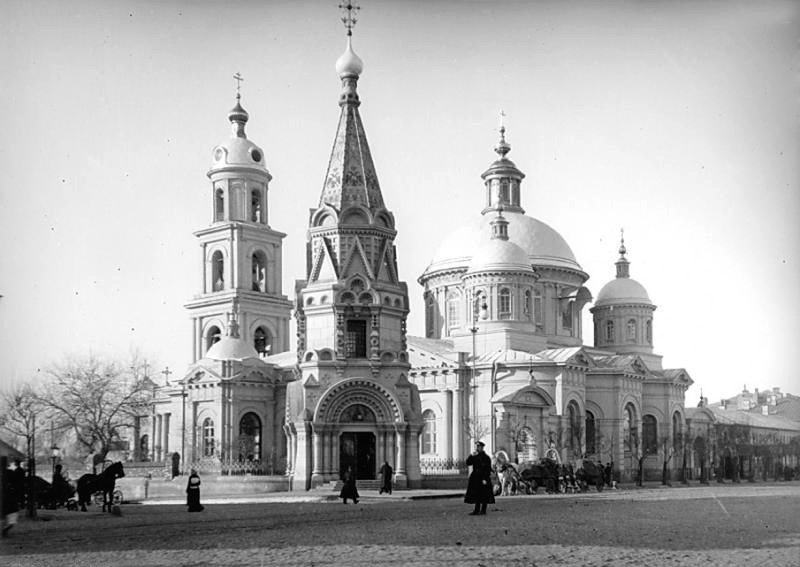
Church of St.Basil of Caesarea

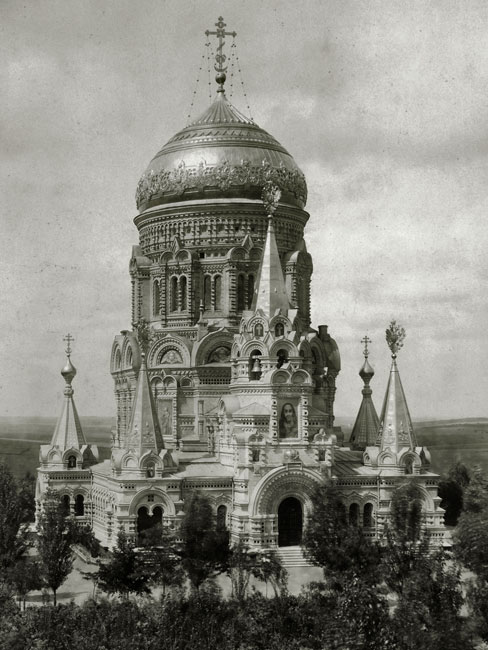
Cathedral of Christ the Saviour in Borky

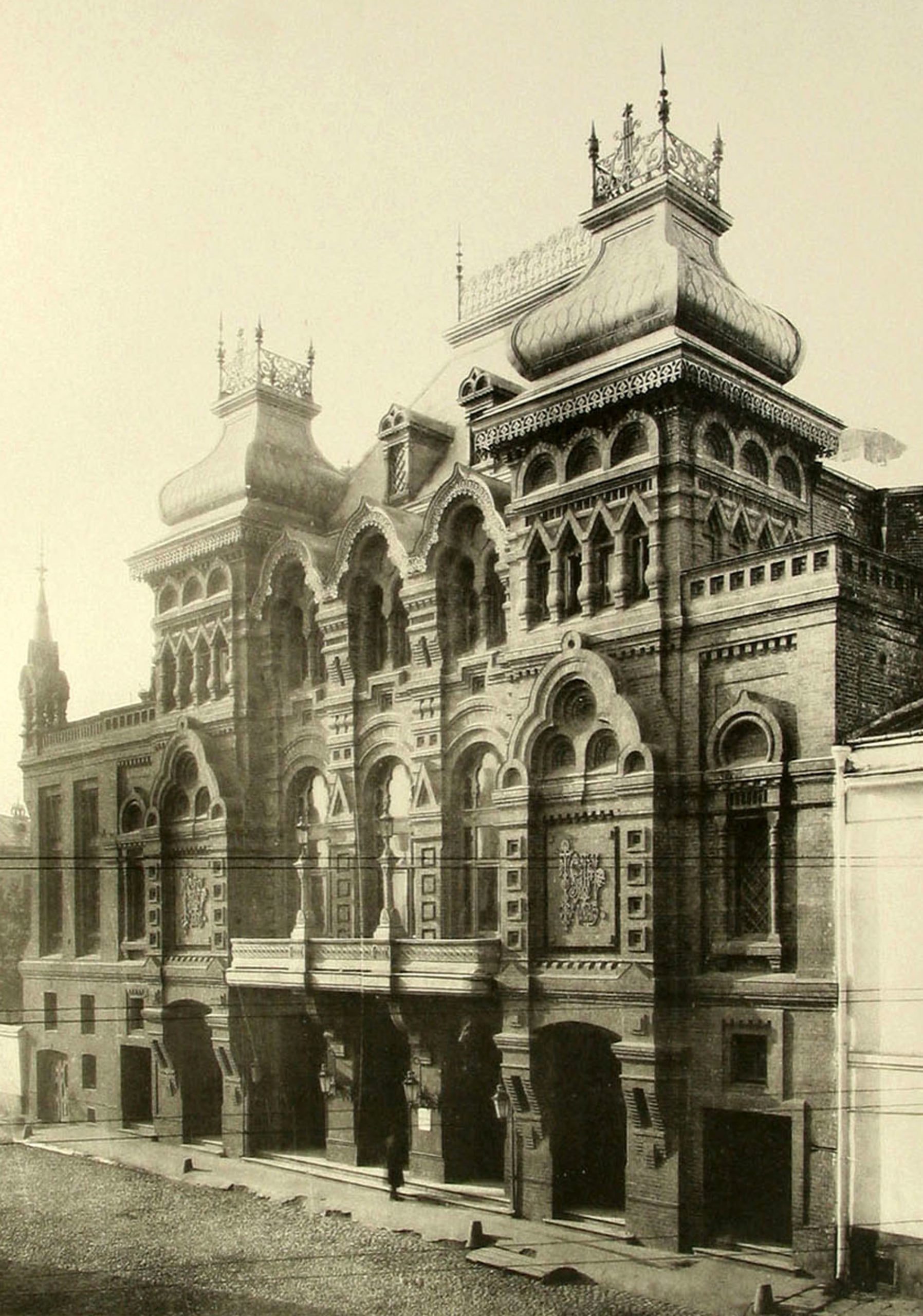
Mayakovsky Theatre

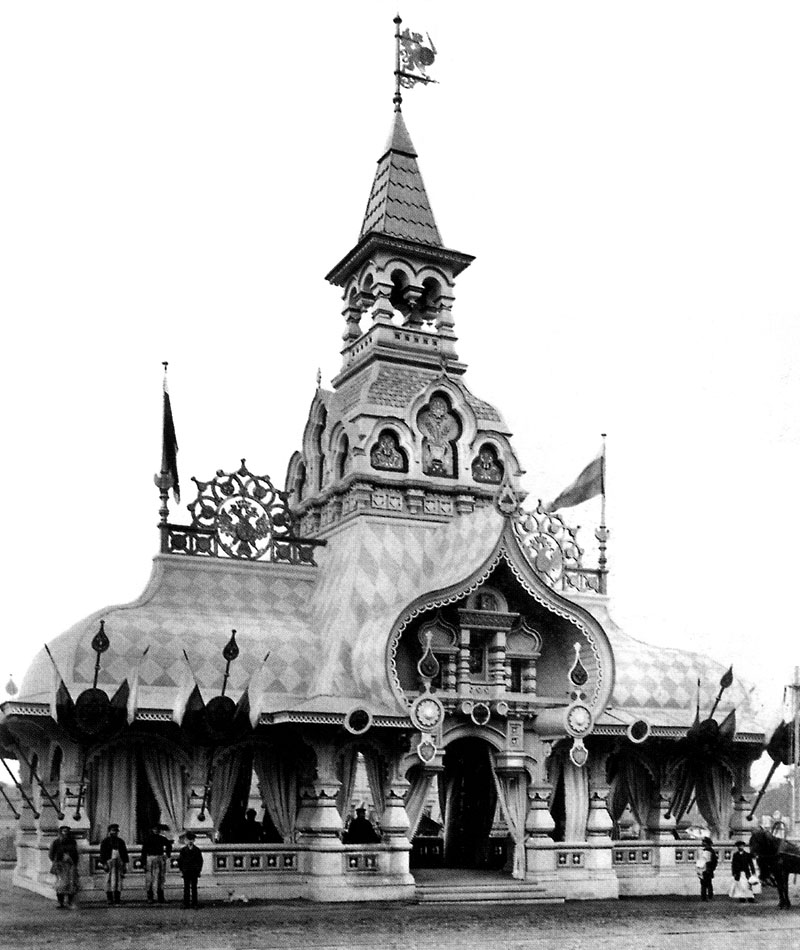
Pavilion at the Triumfalnaya Square

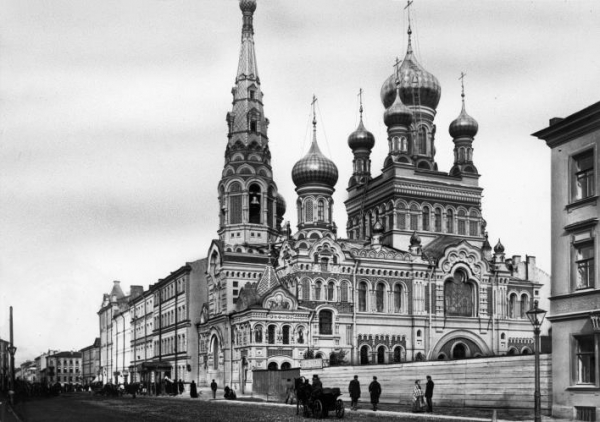
Pokrov church

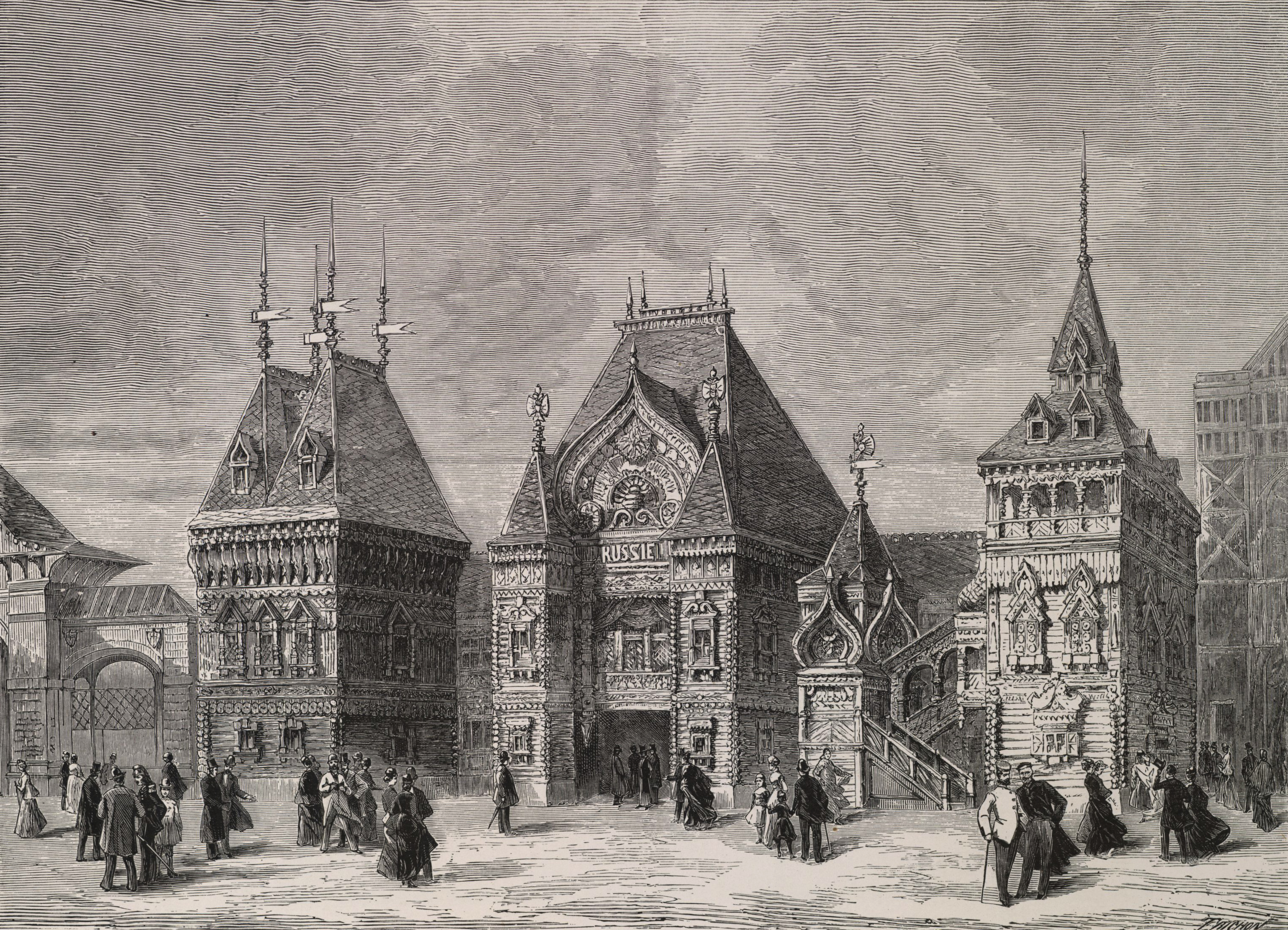
Russian pavilion at the Exposition Universelle (1878)

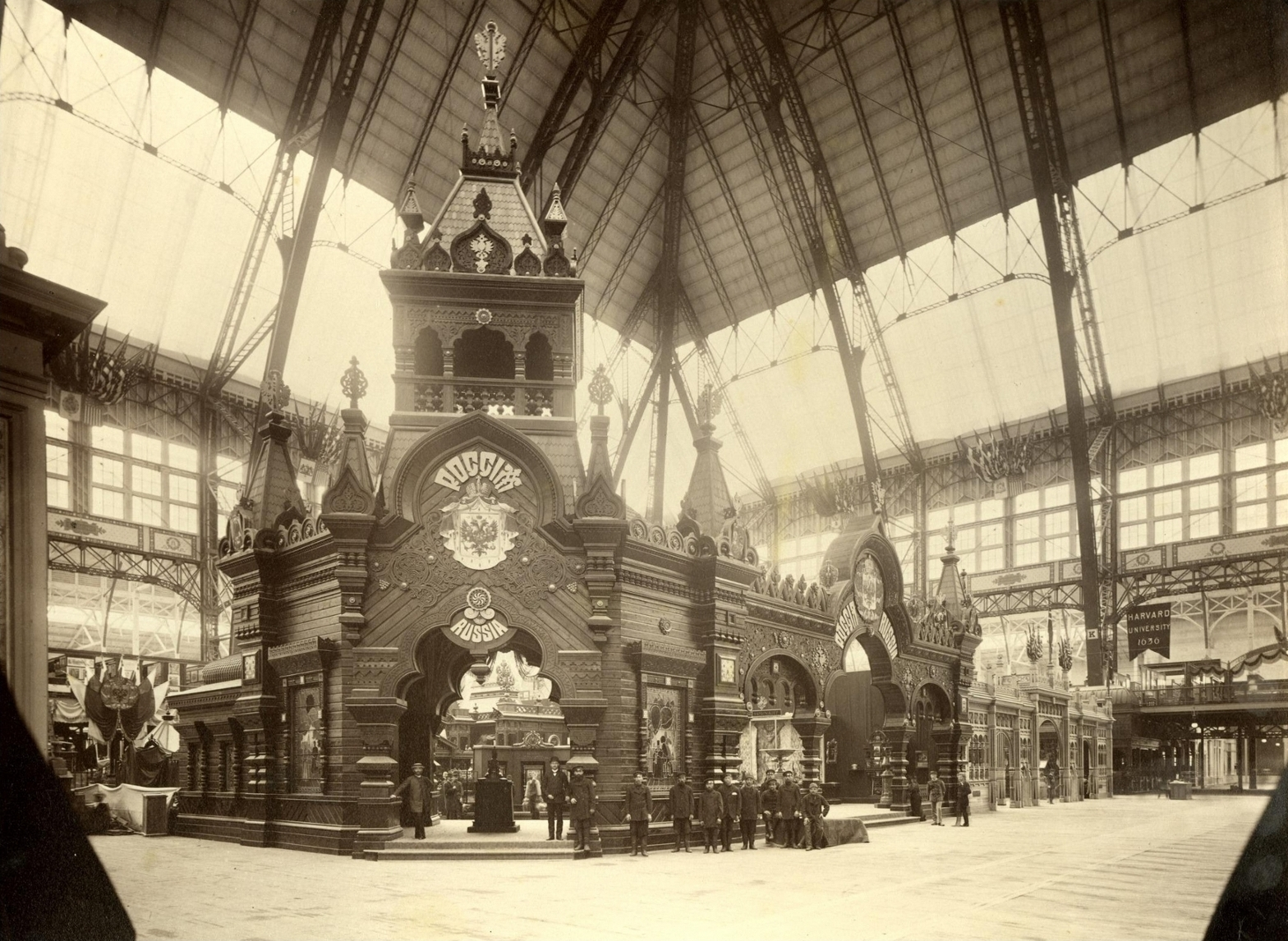
Russian pavilion at the World's Columbian Exposition (1893)

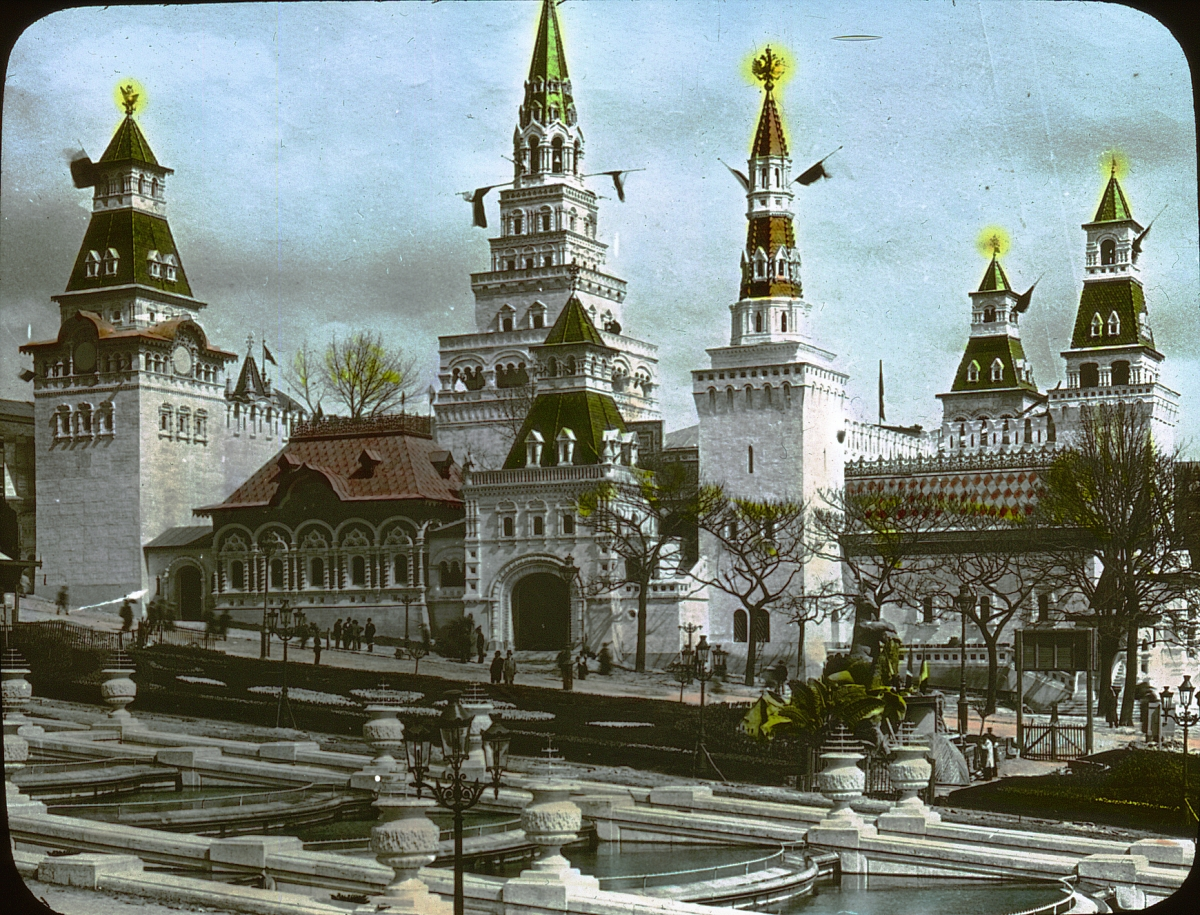
Russian pavilion at the Exposition Universelle (1900)

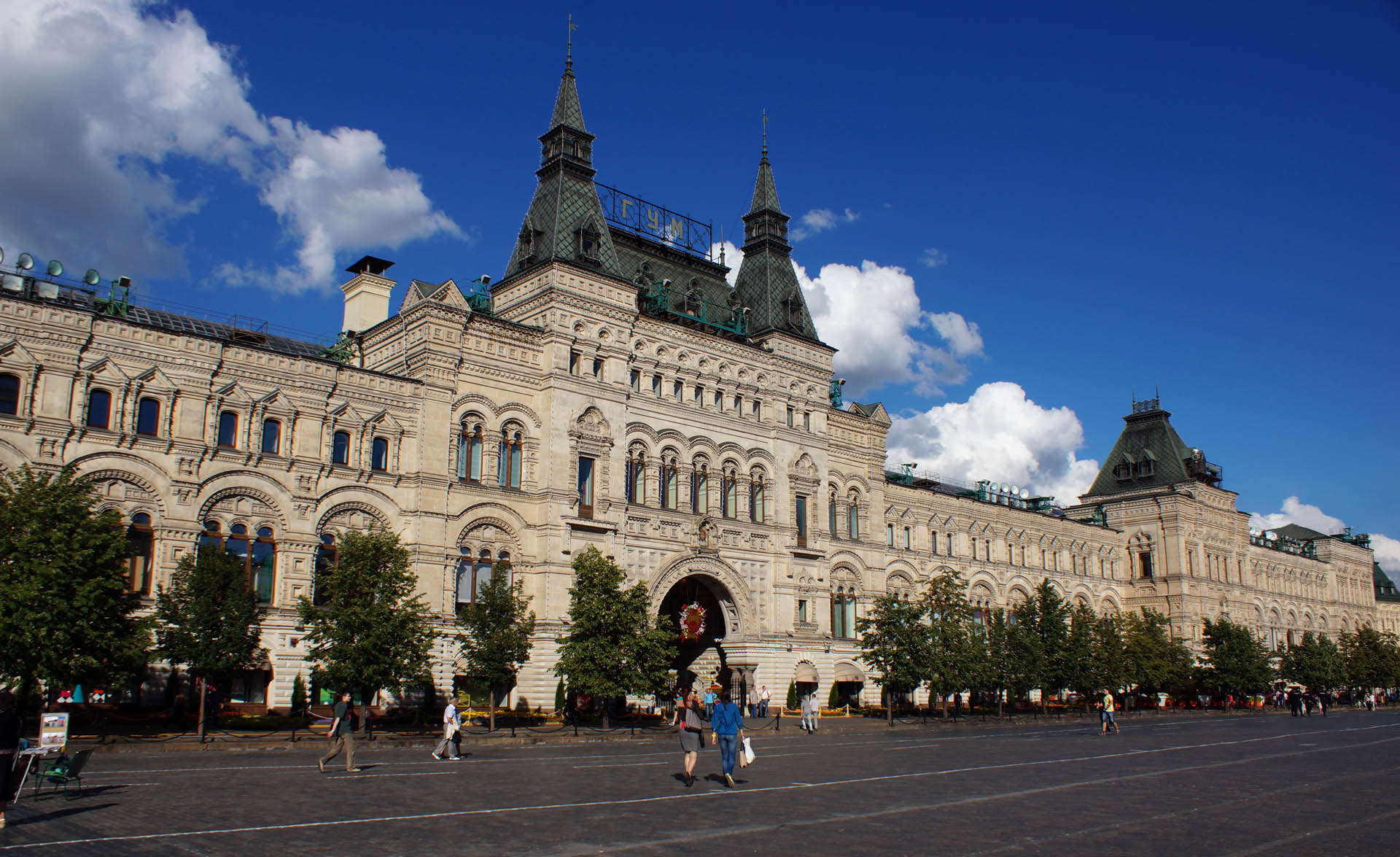
GUM (department store)

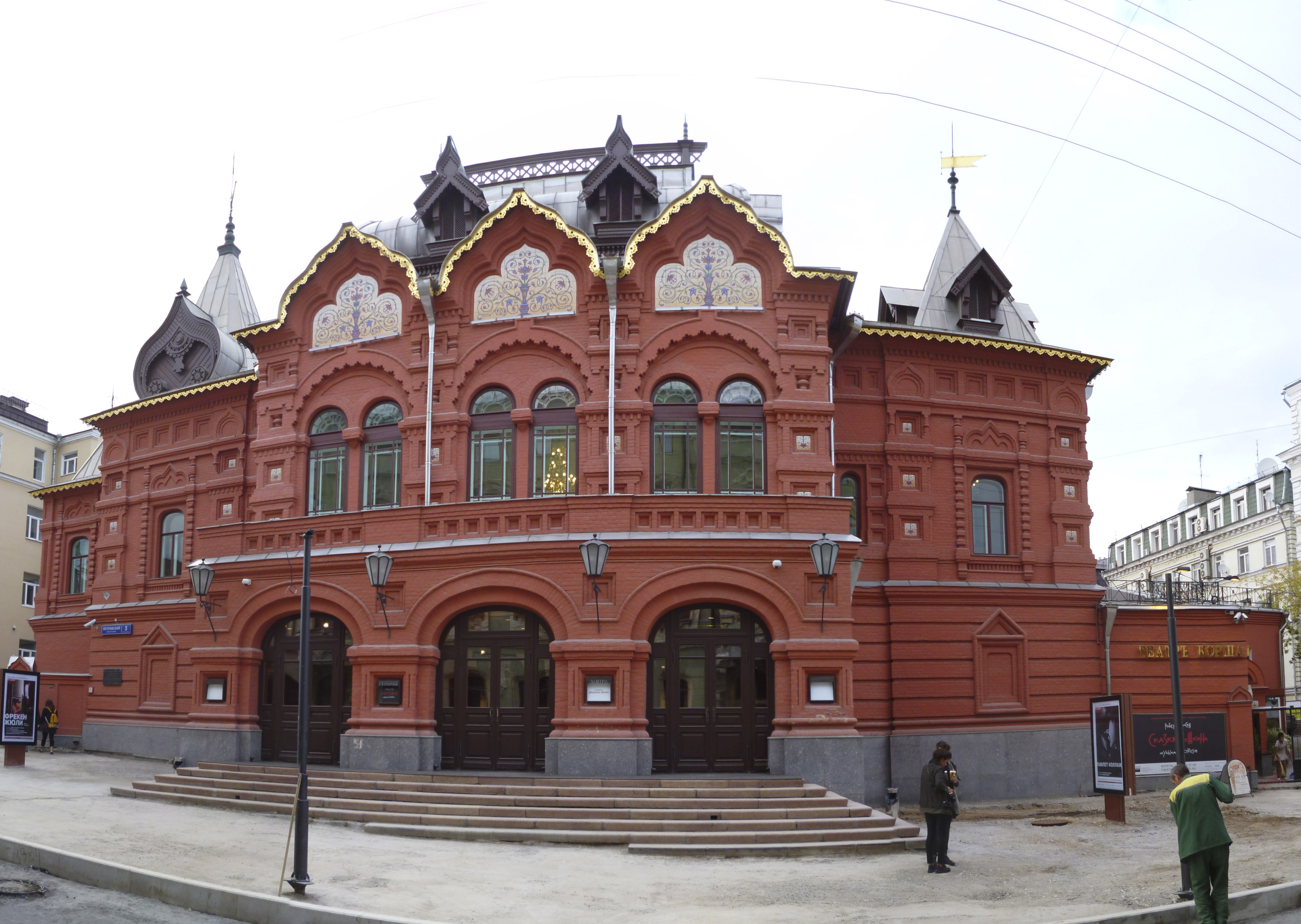
Theatre of Nations

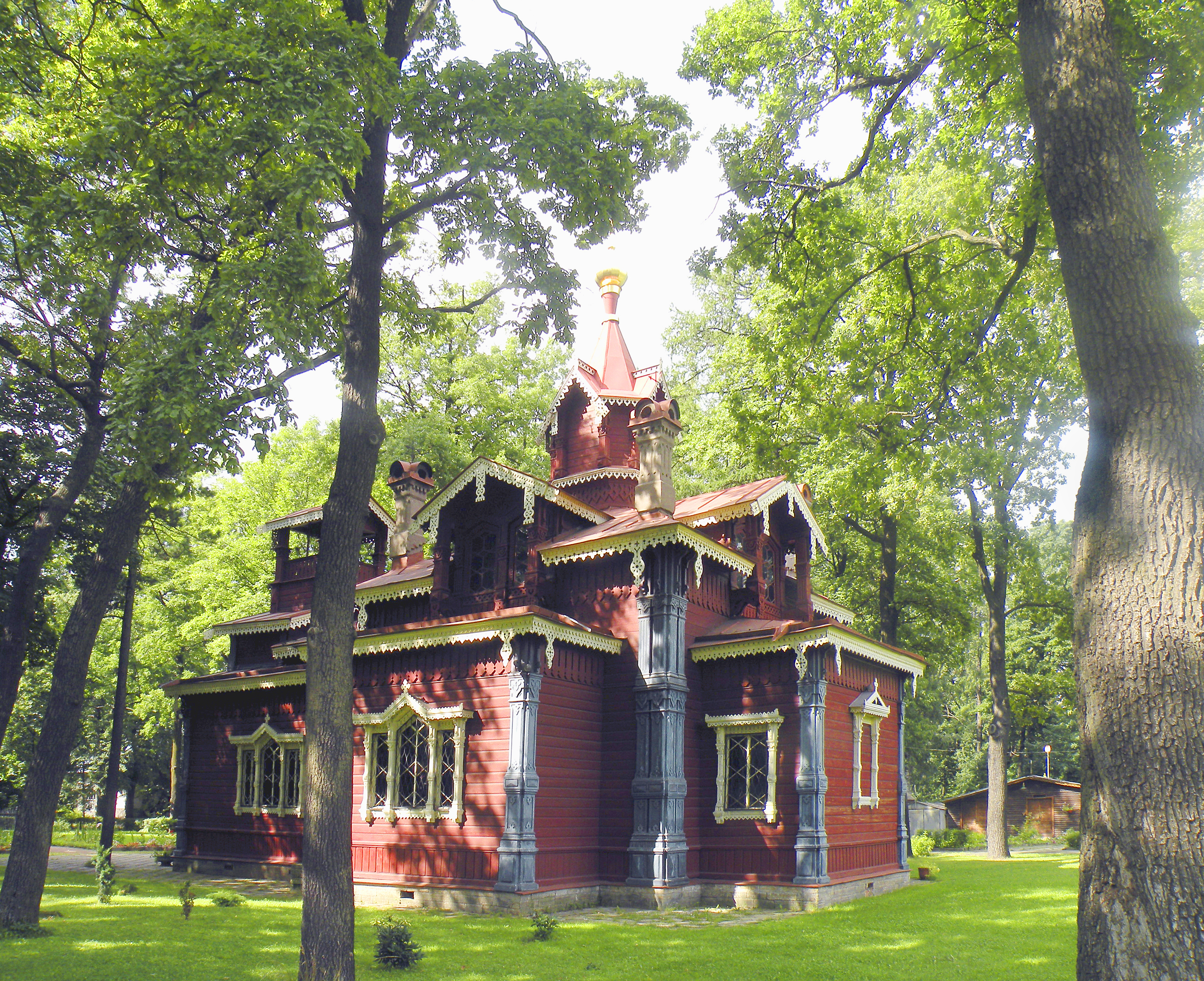
Church of the Great Martyr and Healer Panteleimon in Udelnaya

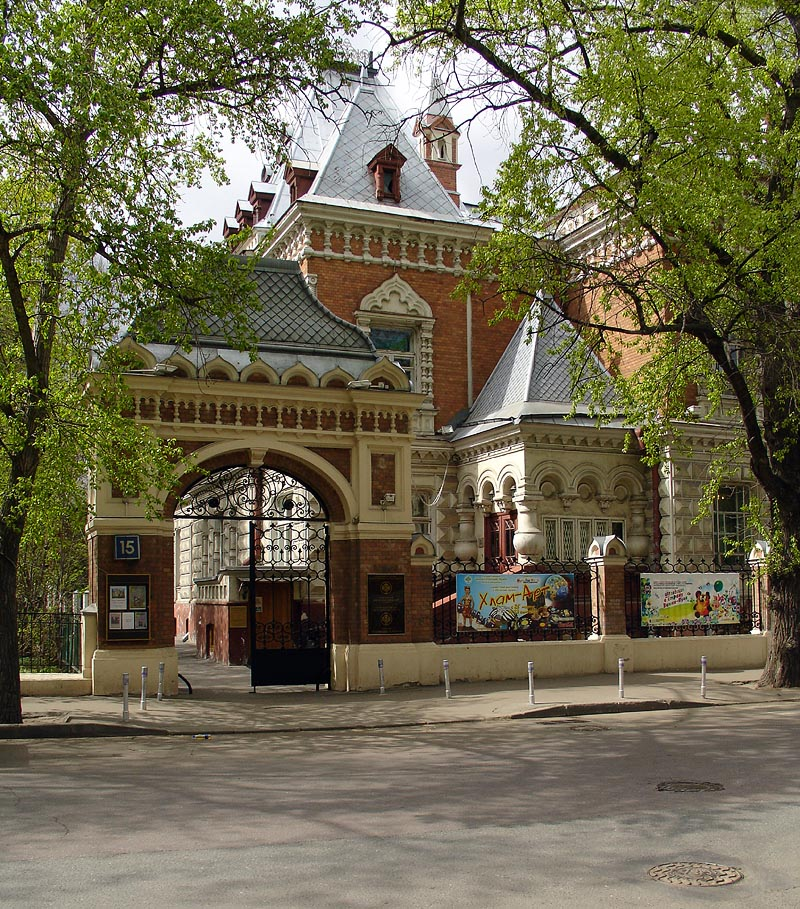
Timiryazev Museum

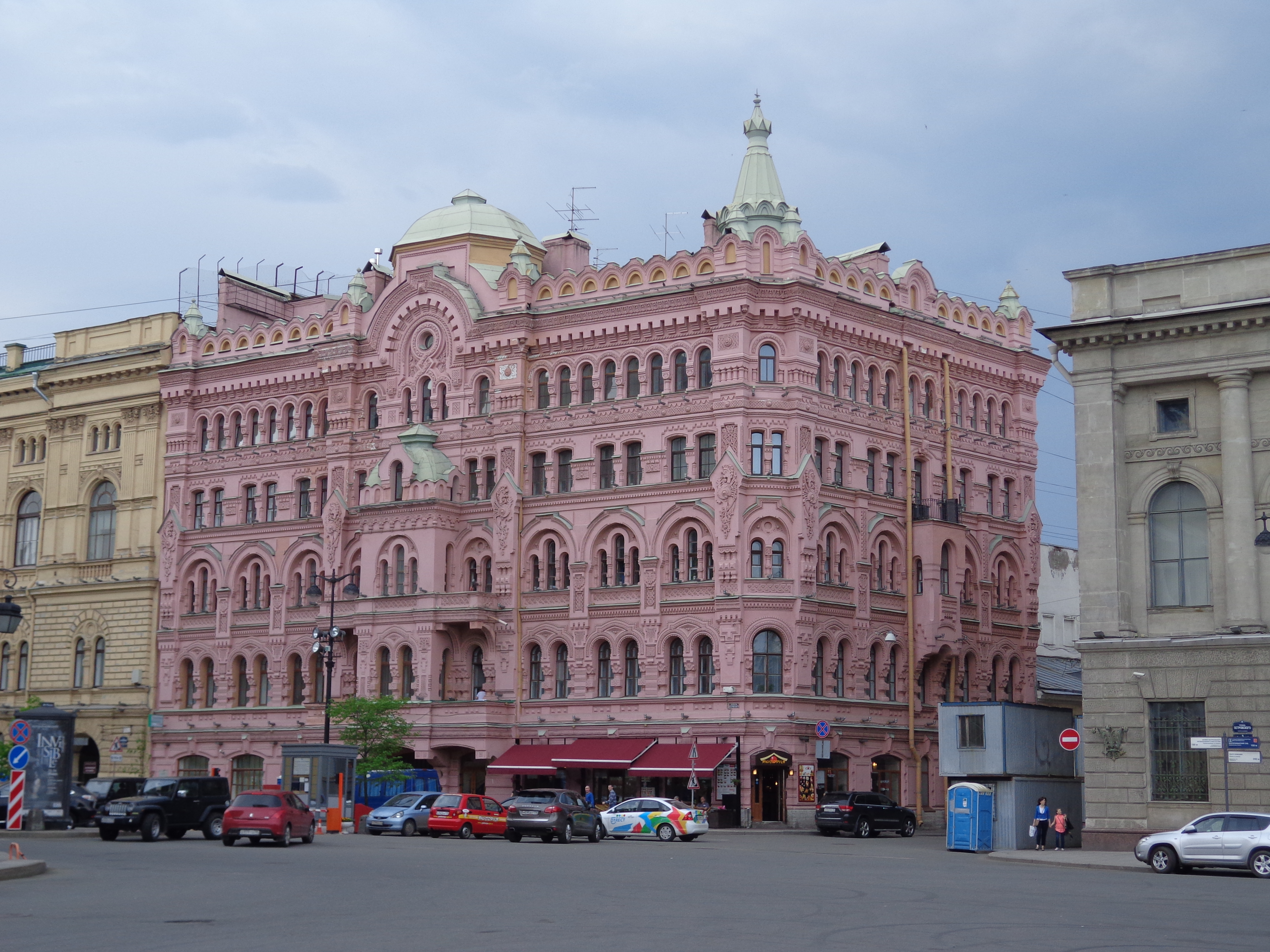
Basin house, St. Petersburg

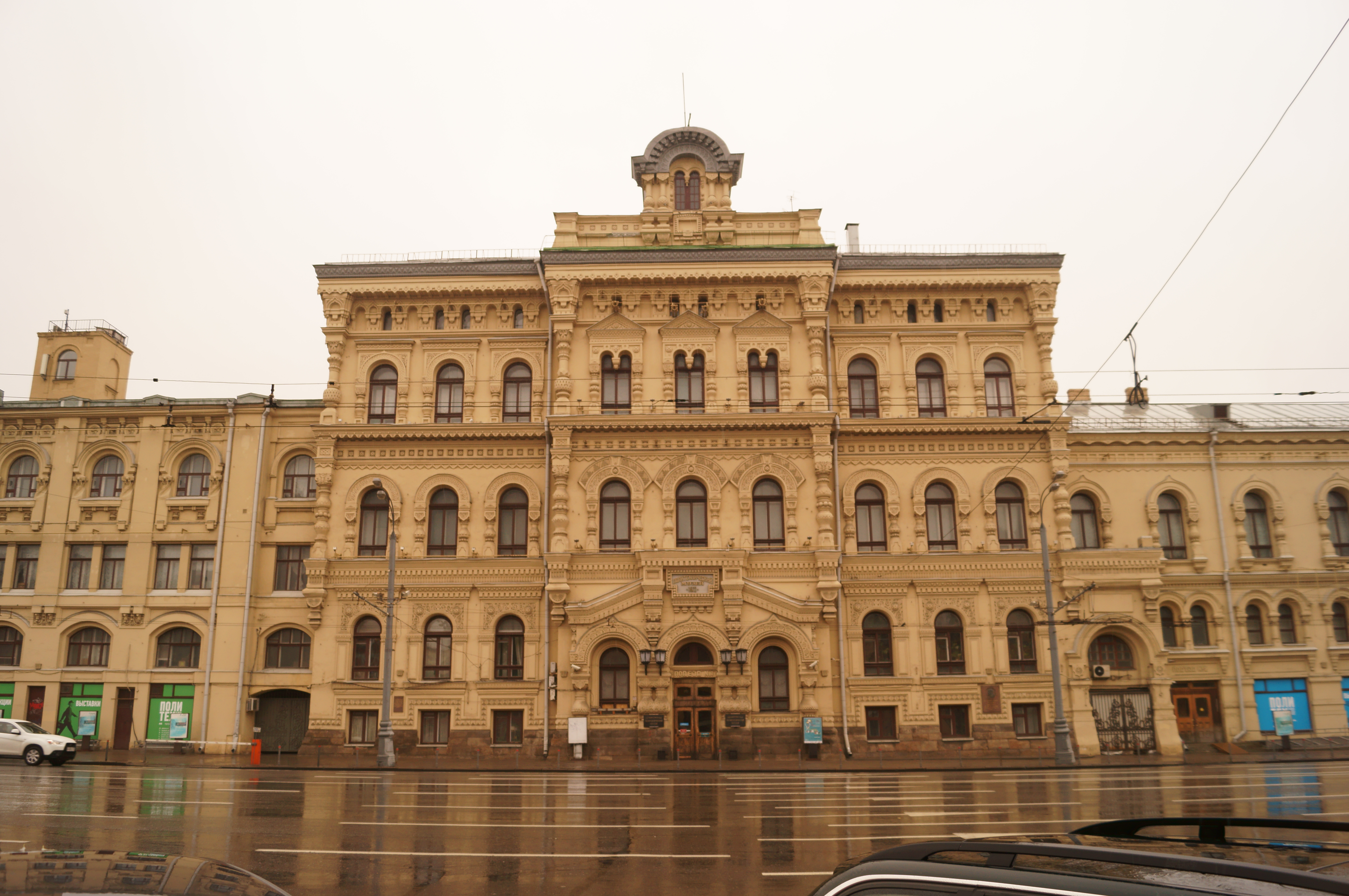
Polytechnic Museum

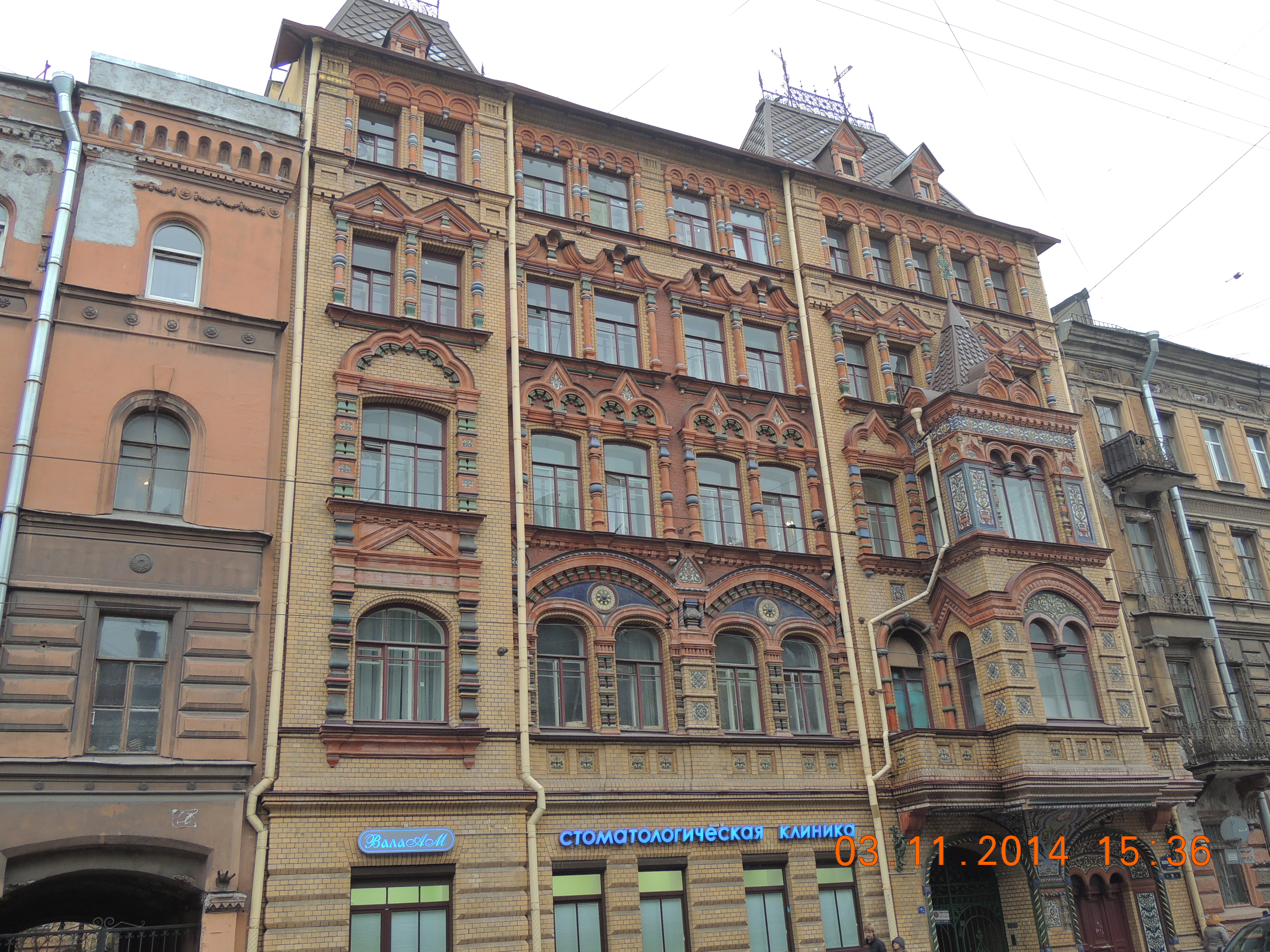
The Nikonov building from Saint Petersburg

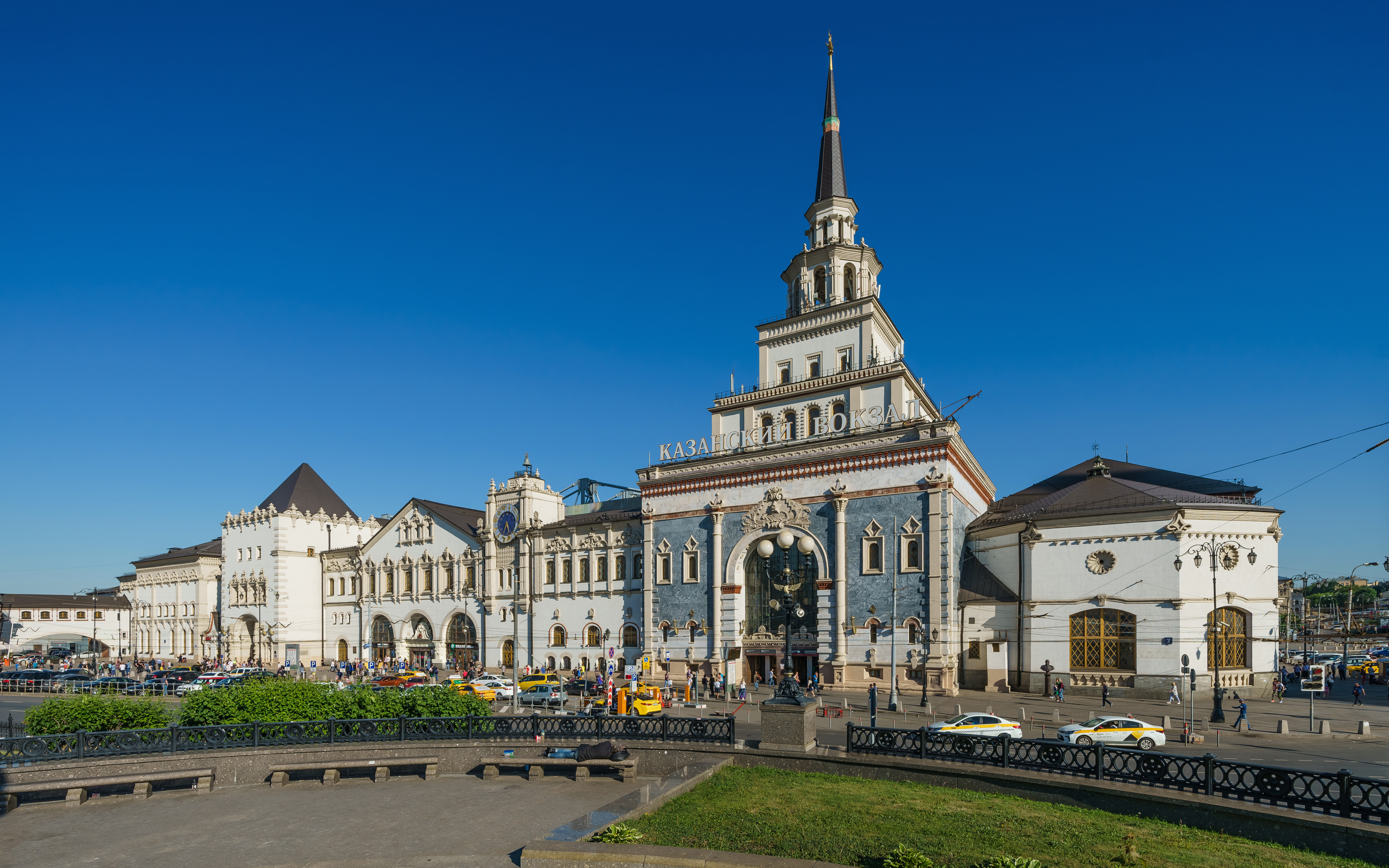
Moscow Kazansky railway station

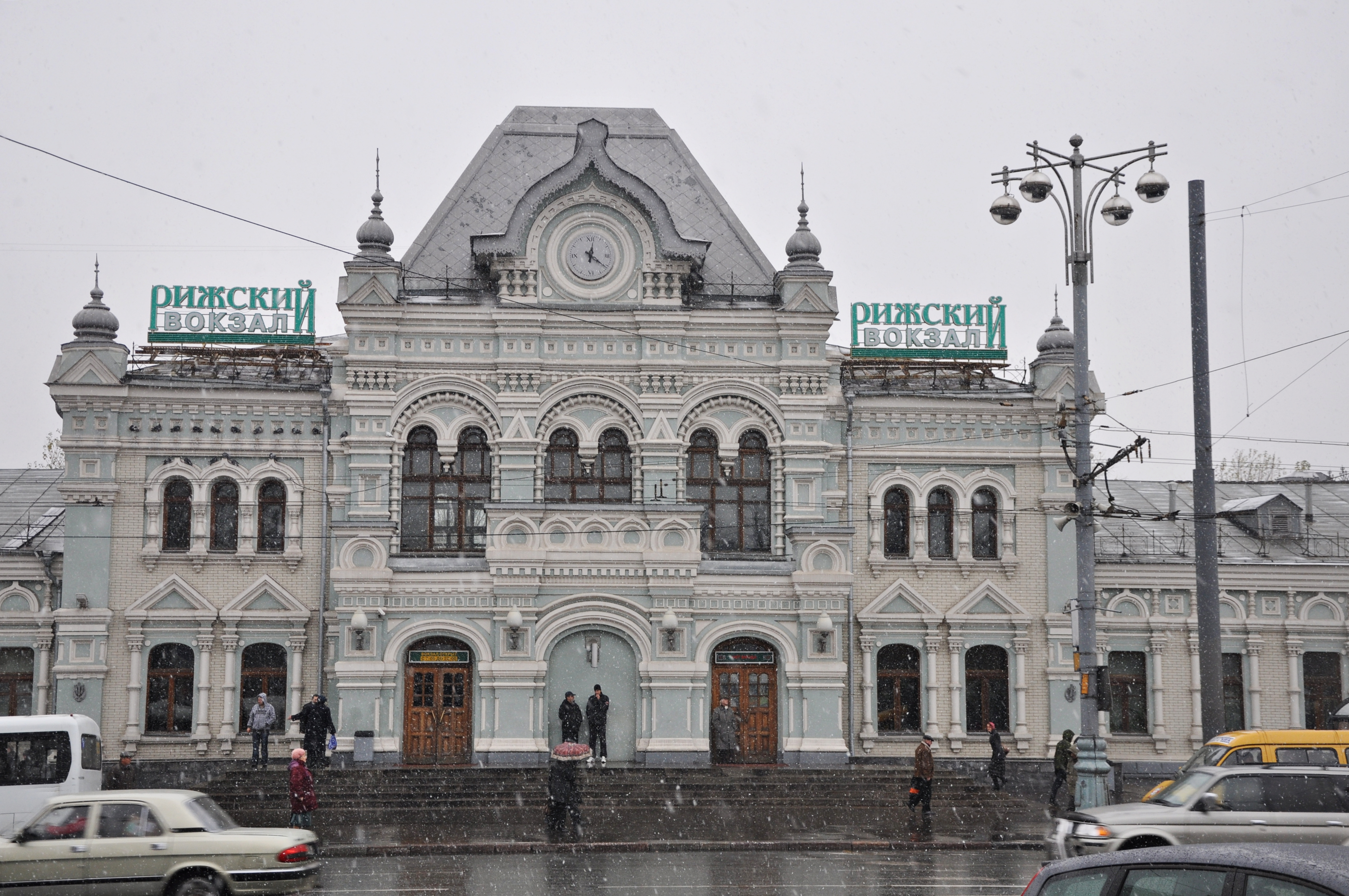
Rizhsky station

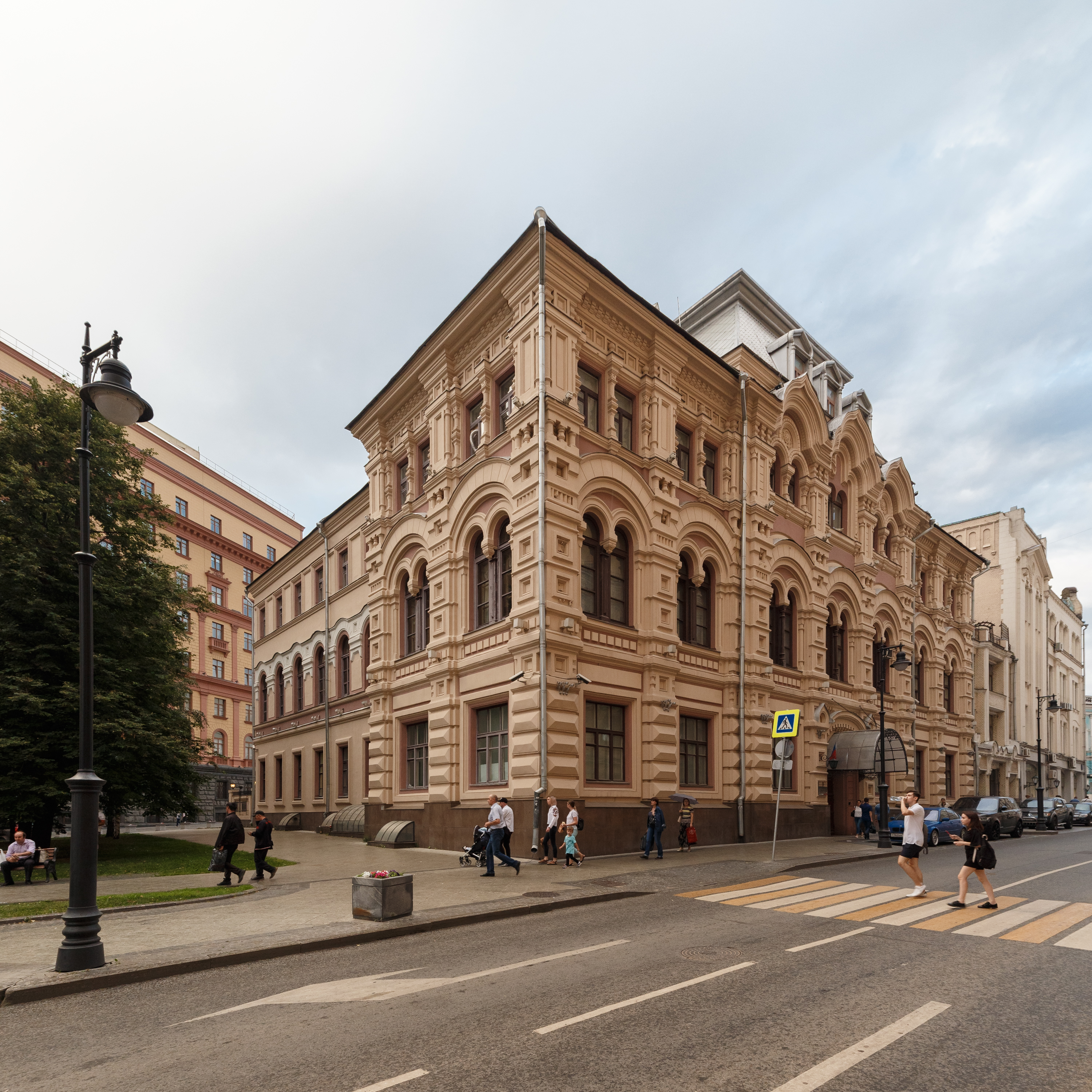
Moscow Spiritual Consistorium

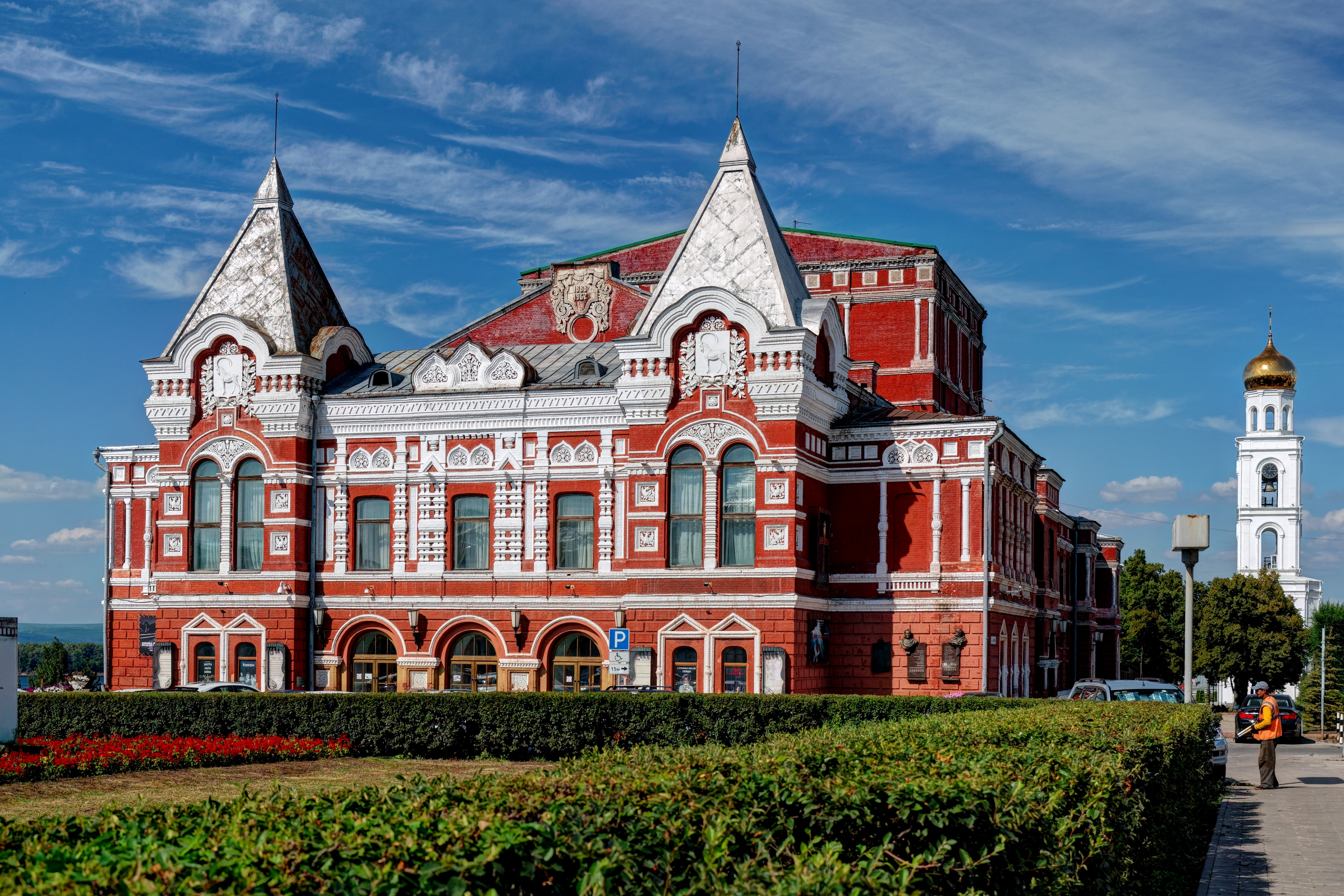
Maksim Gorky Samara Academic Drama Theatre

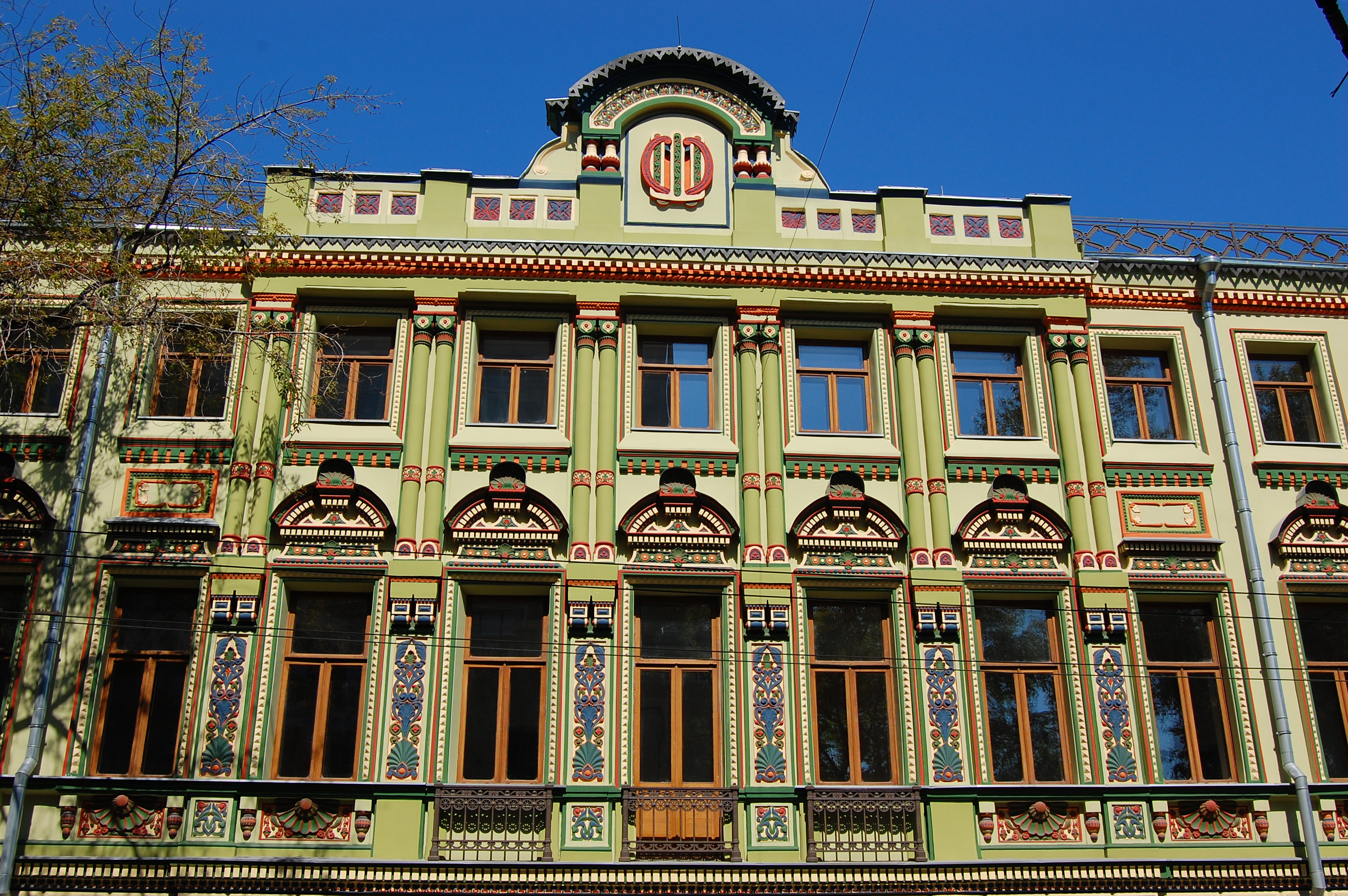
Shibaevs’ estate

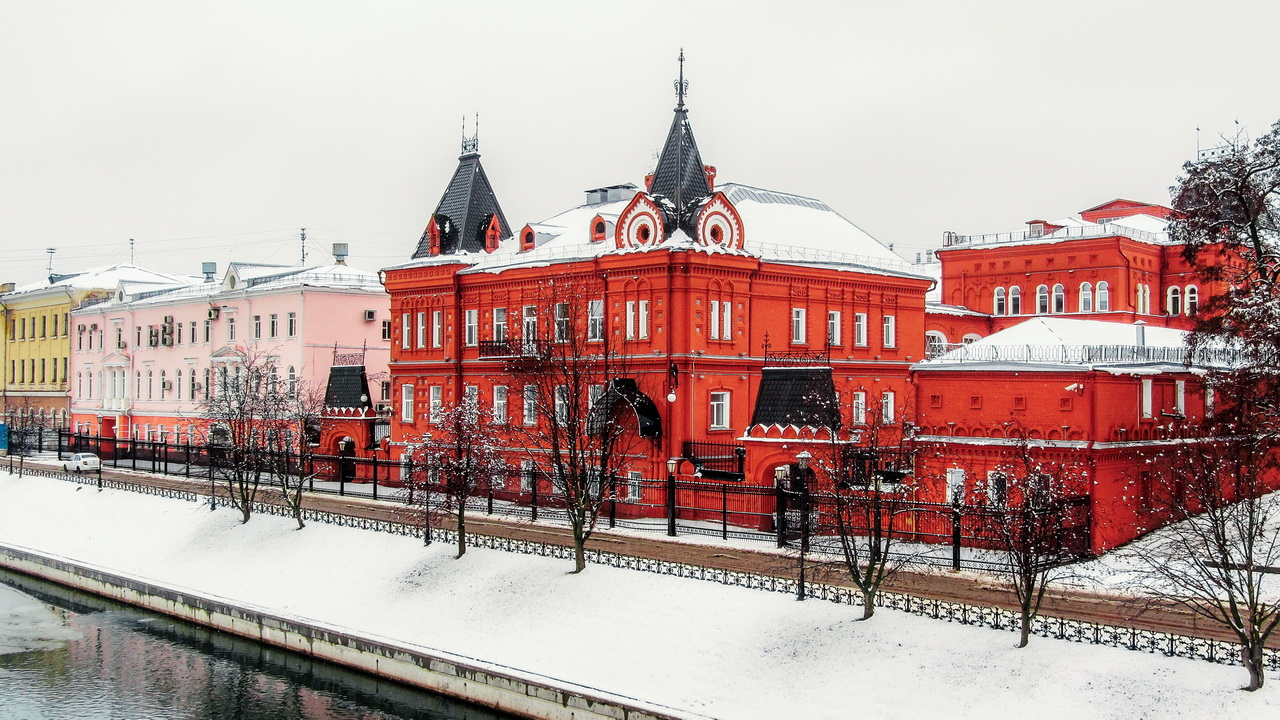
Central Bank branch, Oryol

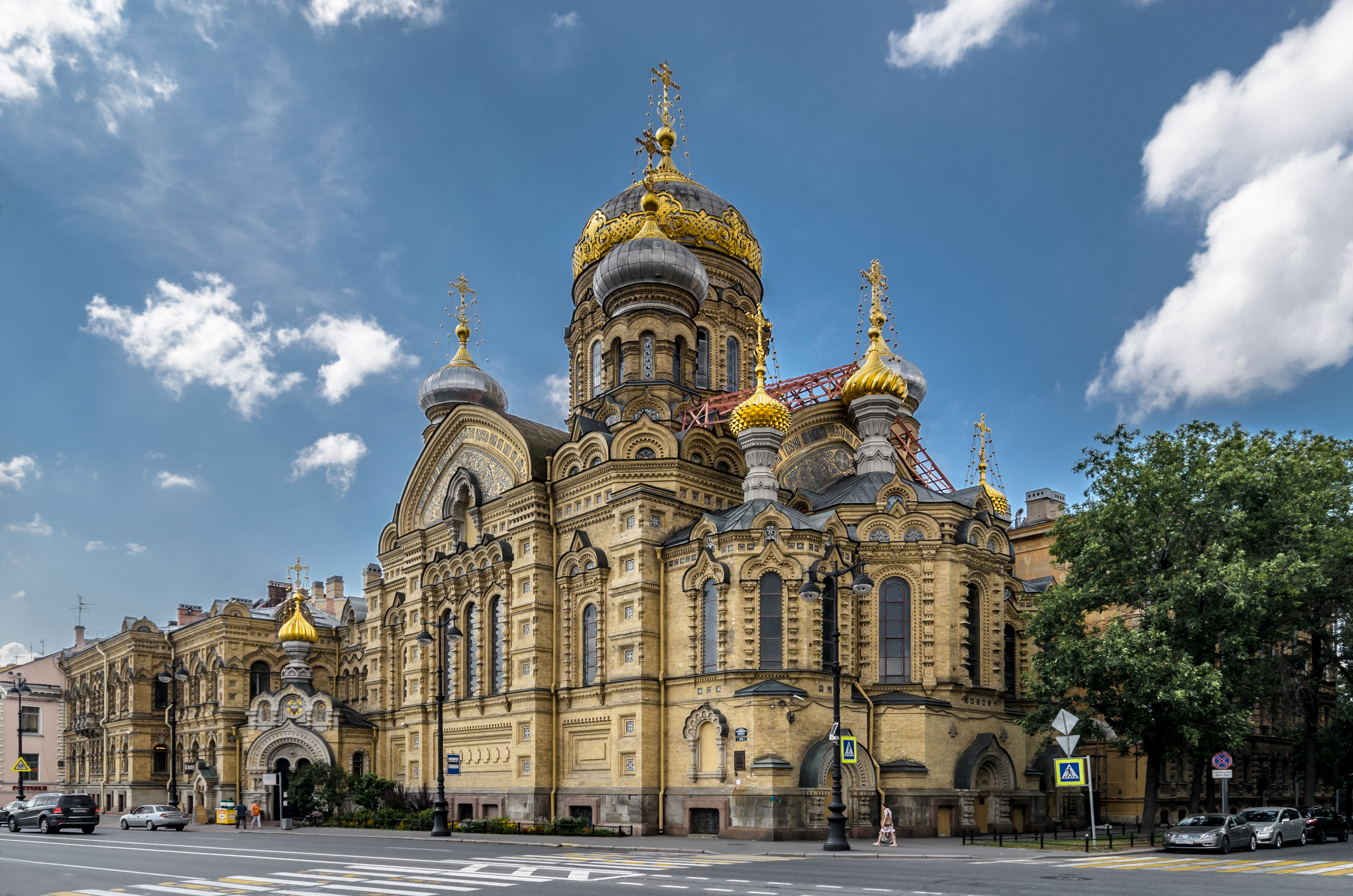
Church of the Assumption, Saint Petersburg

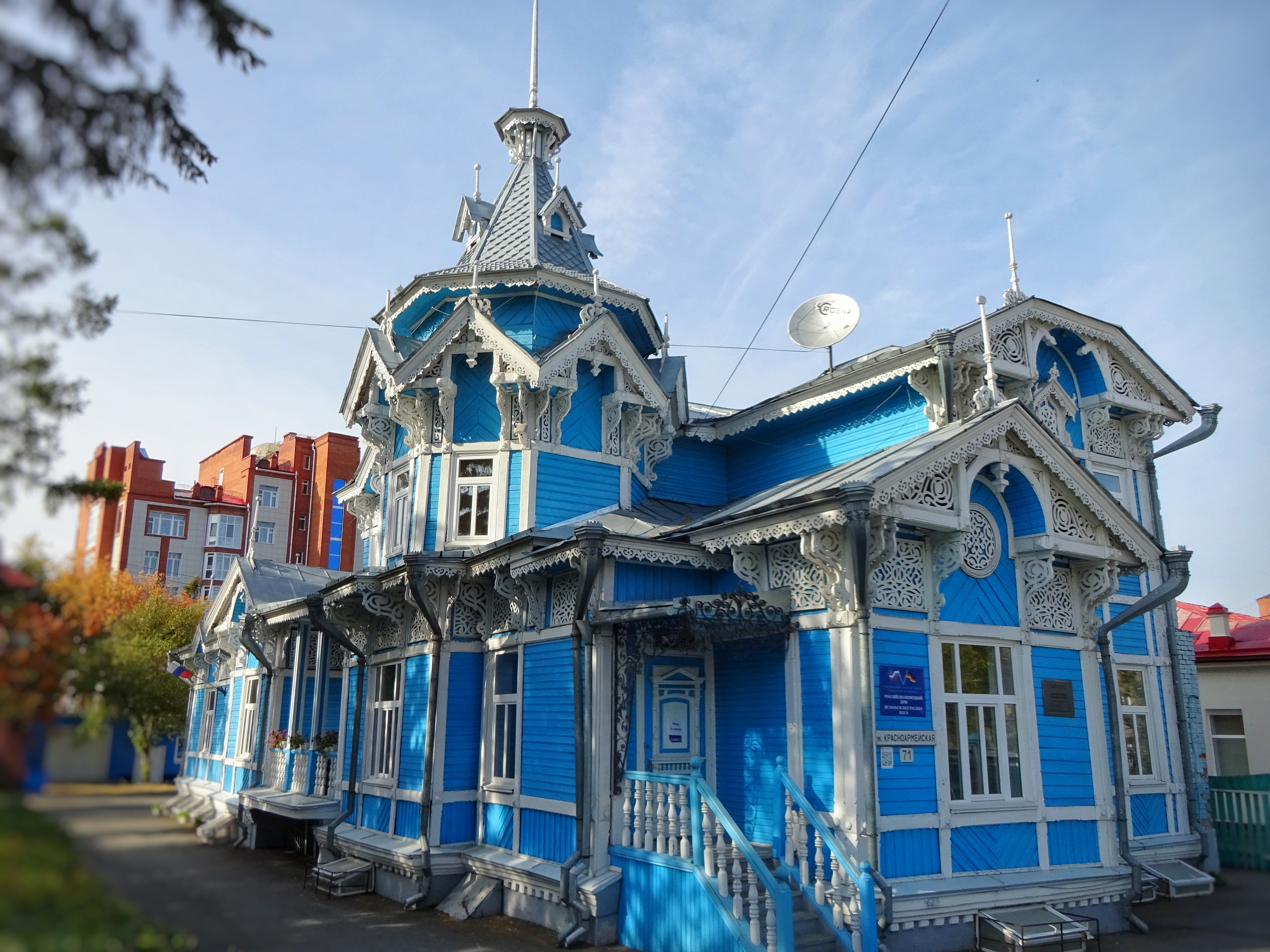
Golovanov House, Tomsk

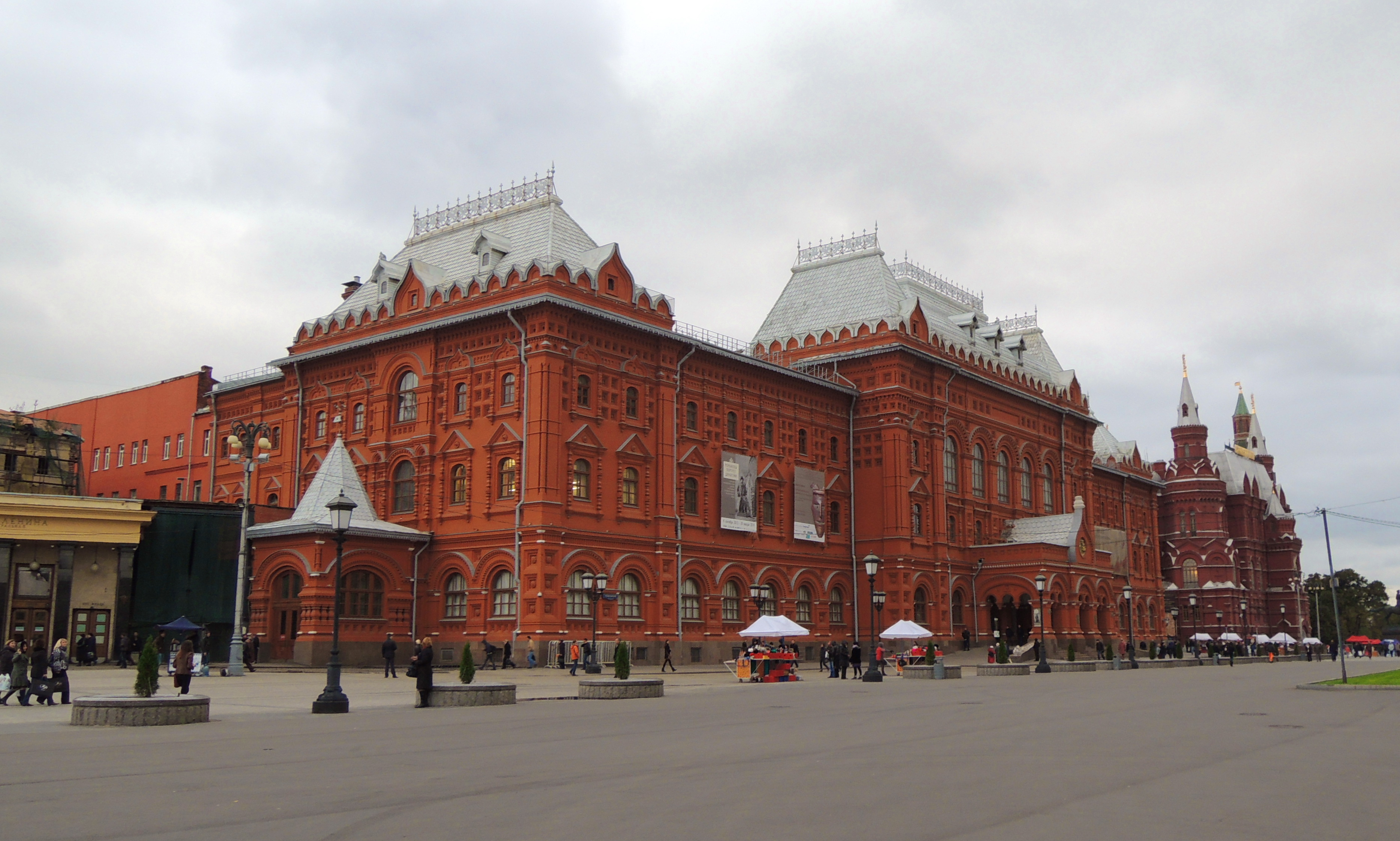
Moscow City Duma

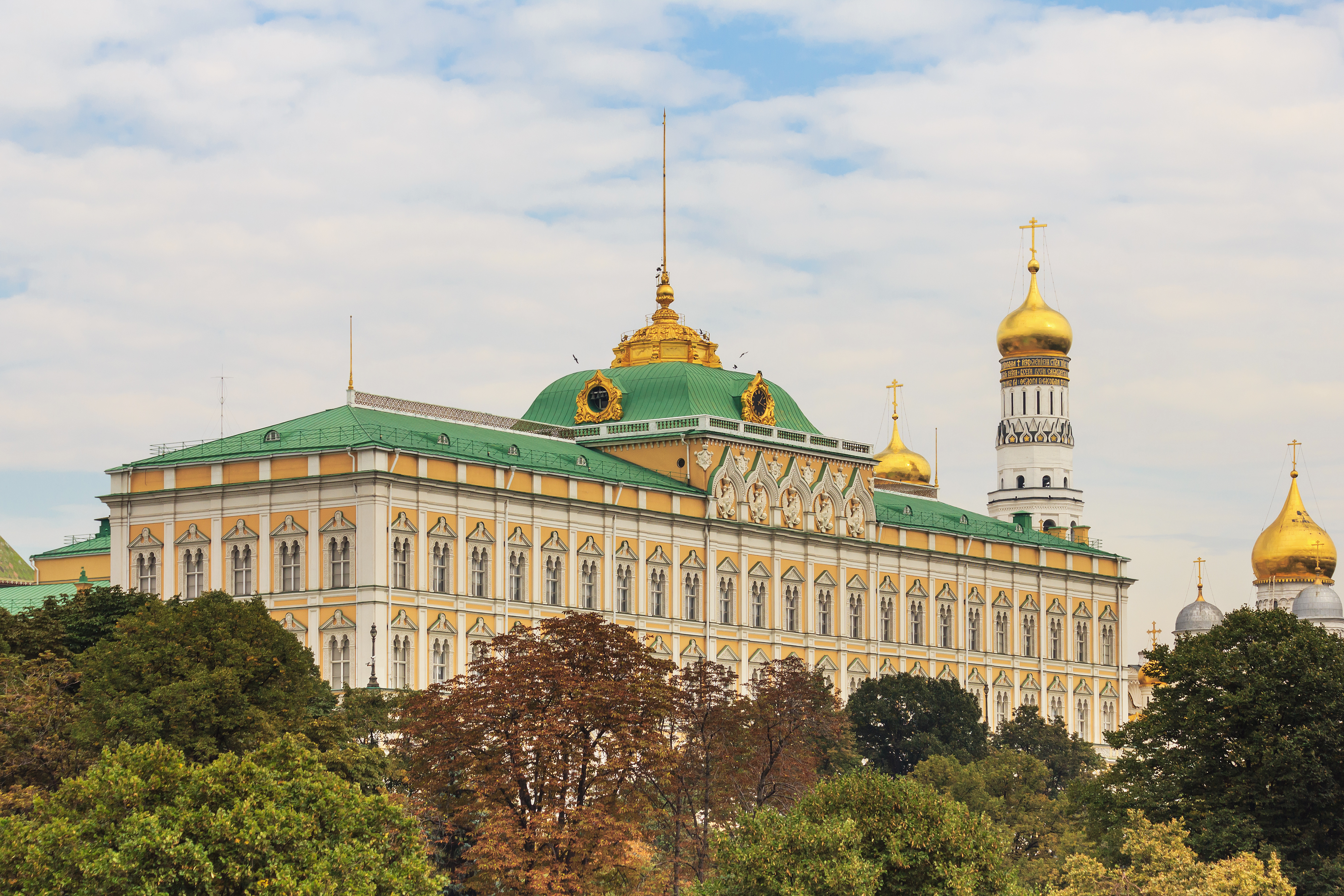
Grand Kremlin Palace

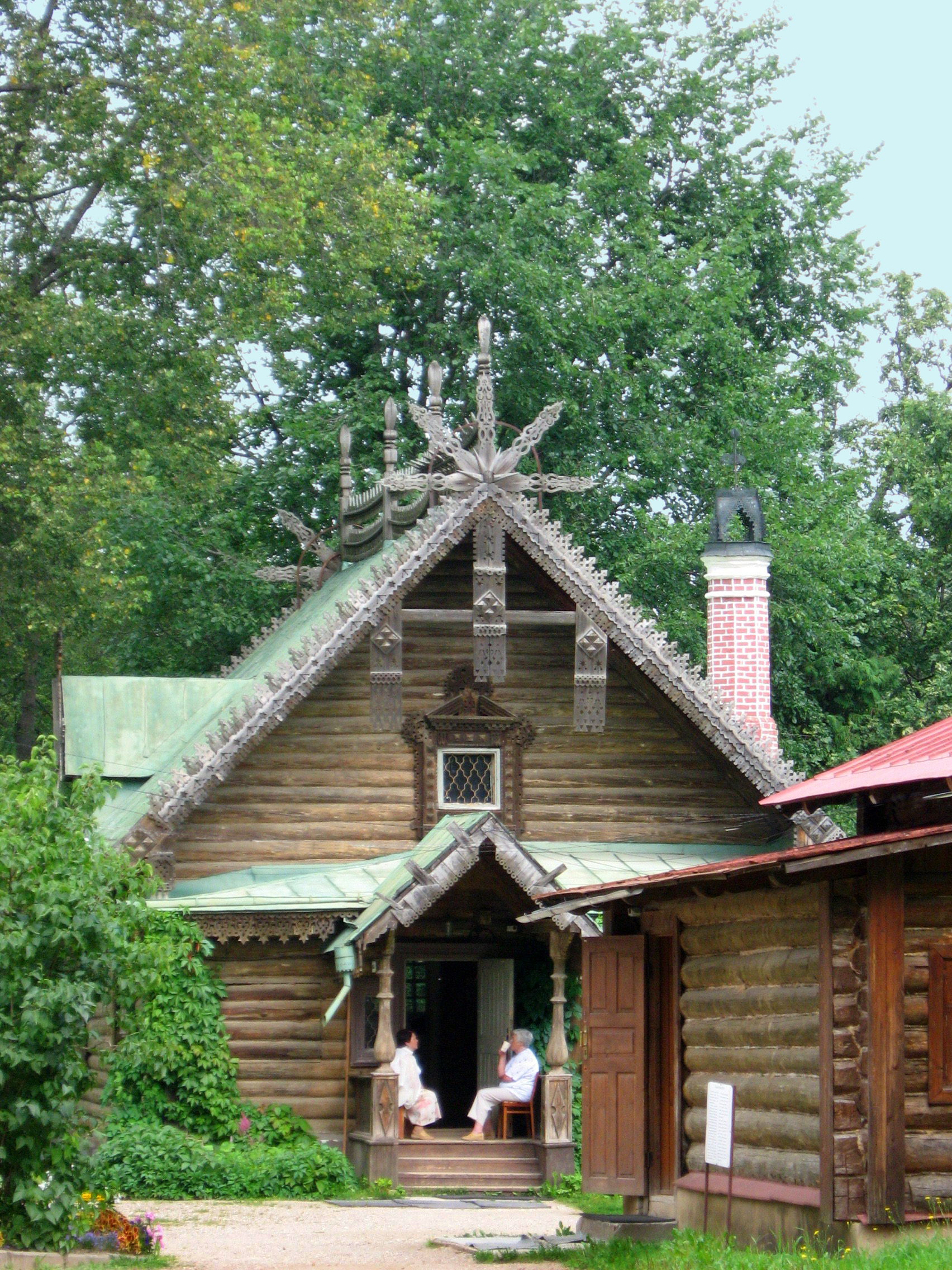
Abramtsevo Colony

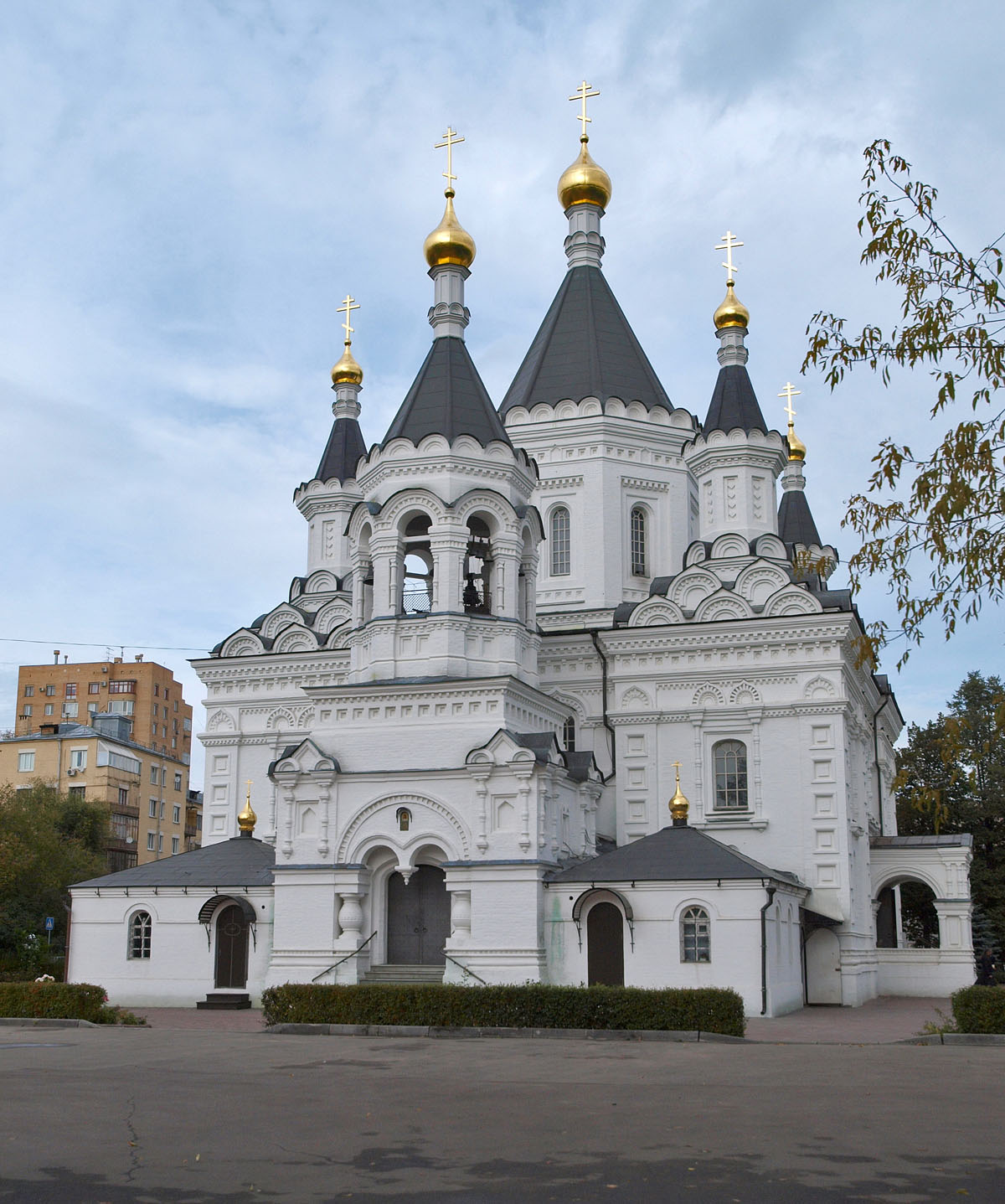
Church of Archangel Michael

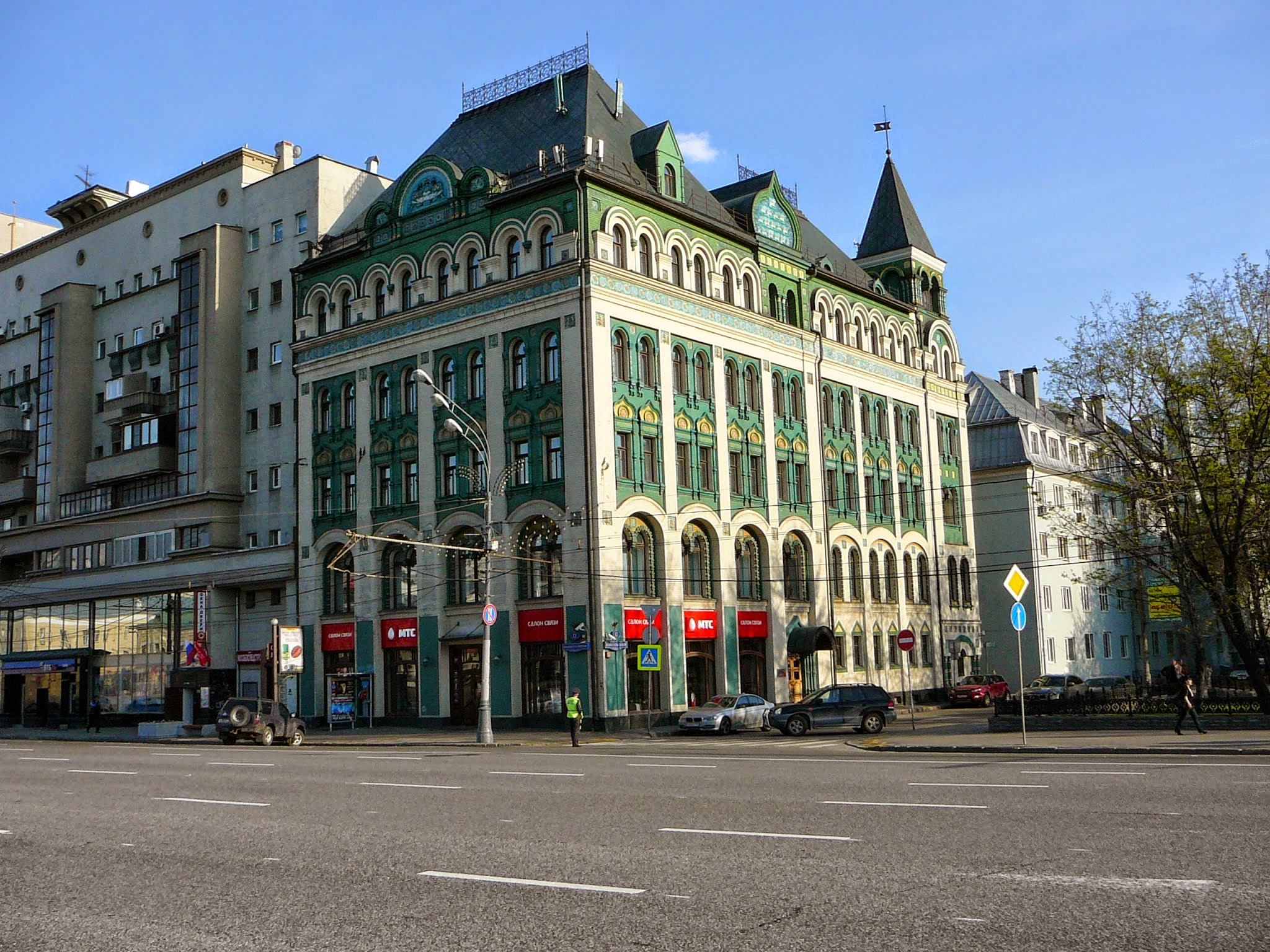
Miansarova-Gutman house

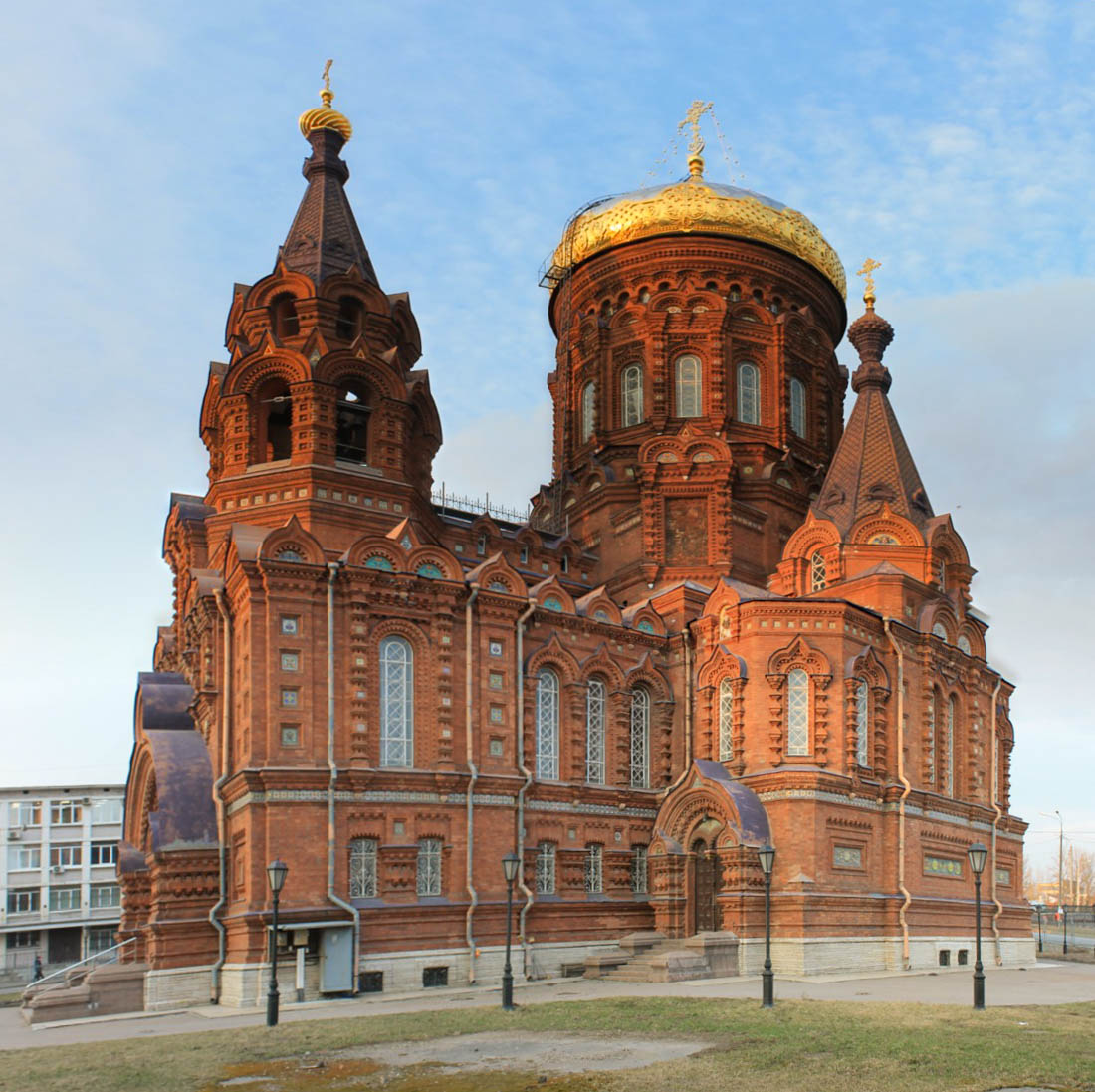
Church of the Epiphany

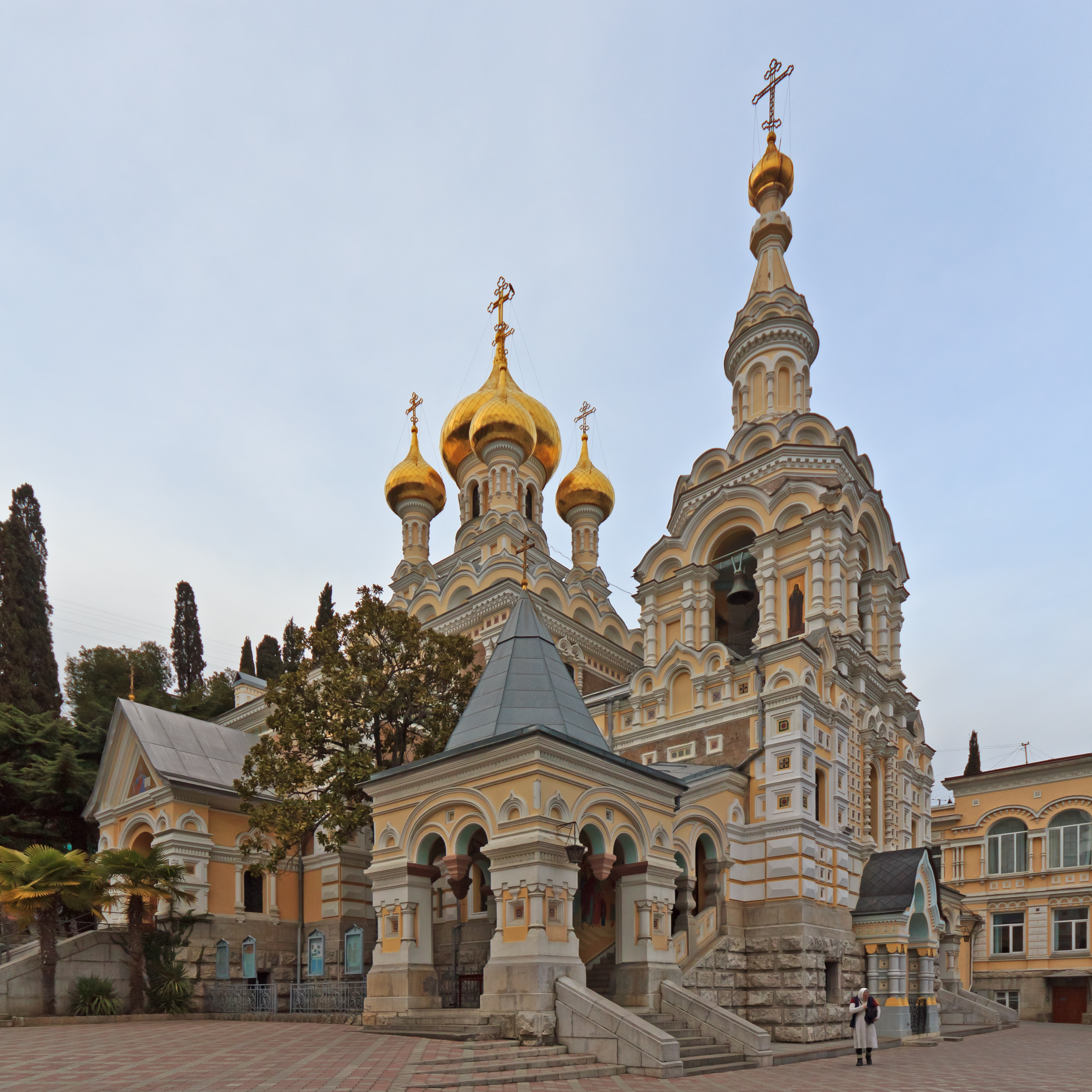
Alexander Nevsky Cathedral, Yalta

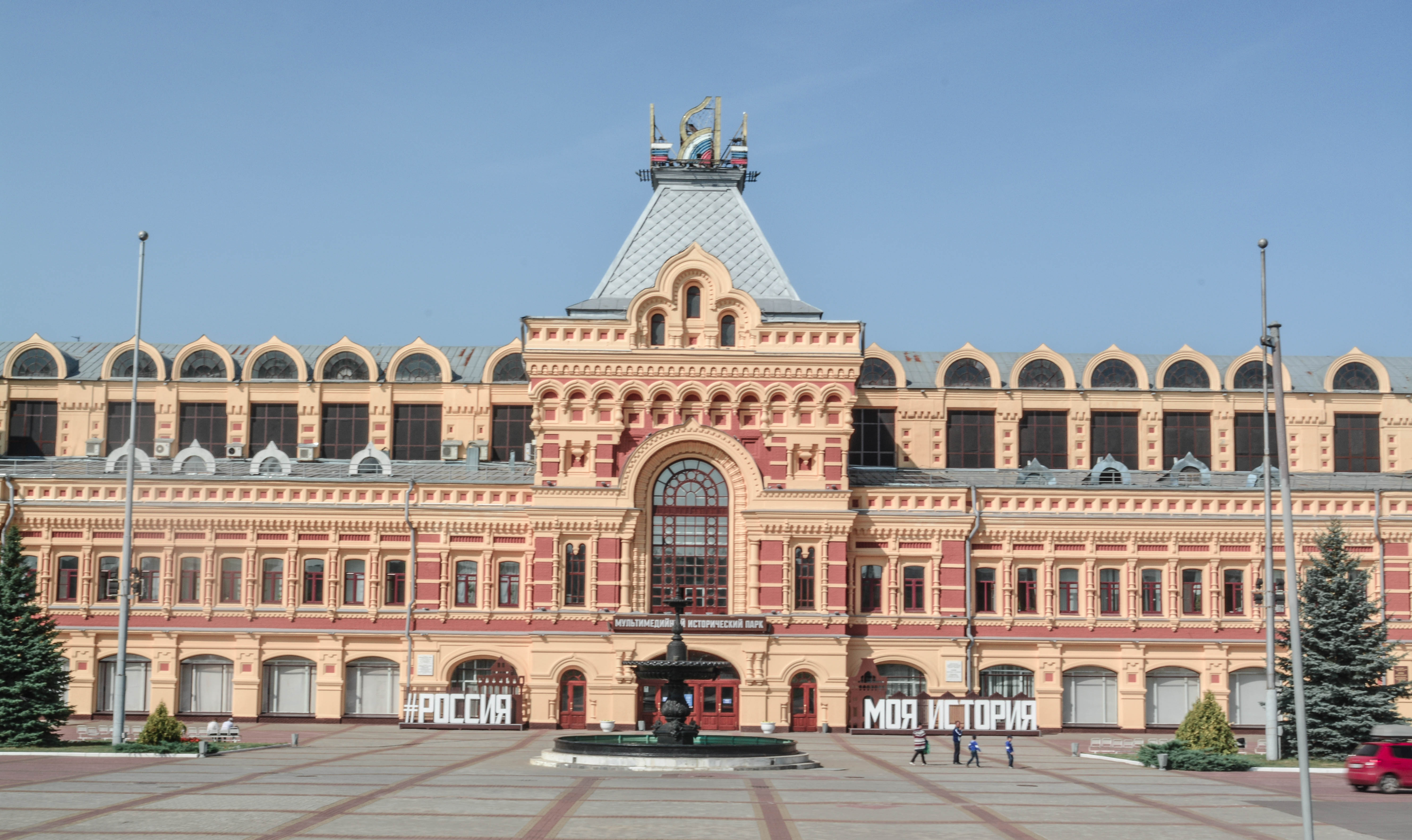
Nizhny Novgorod Fair

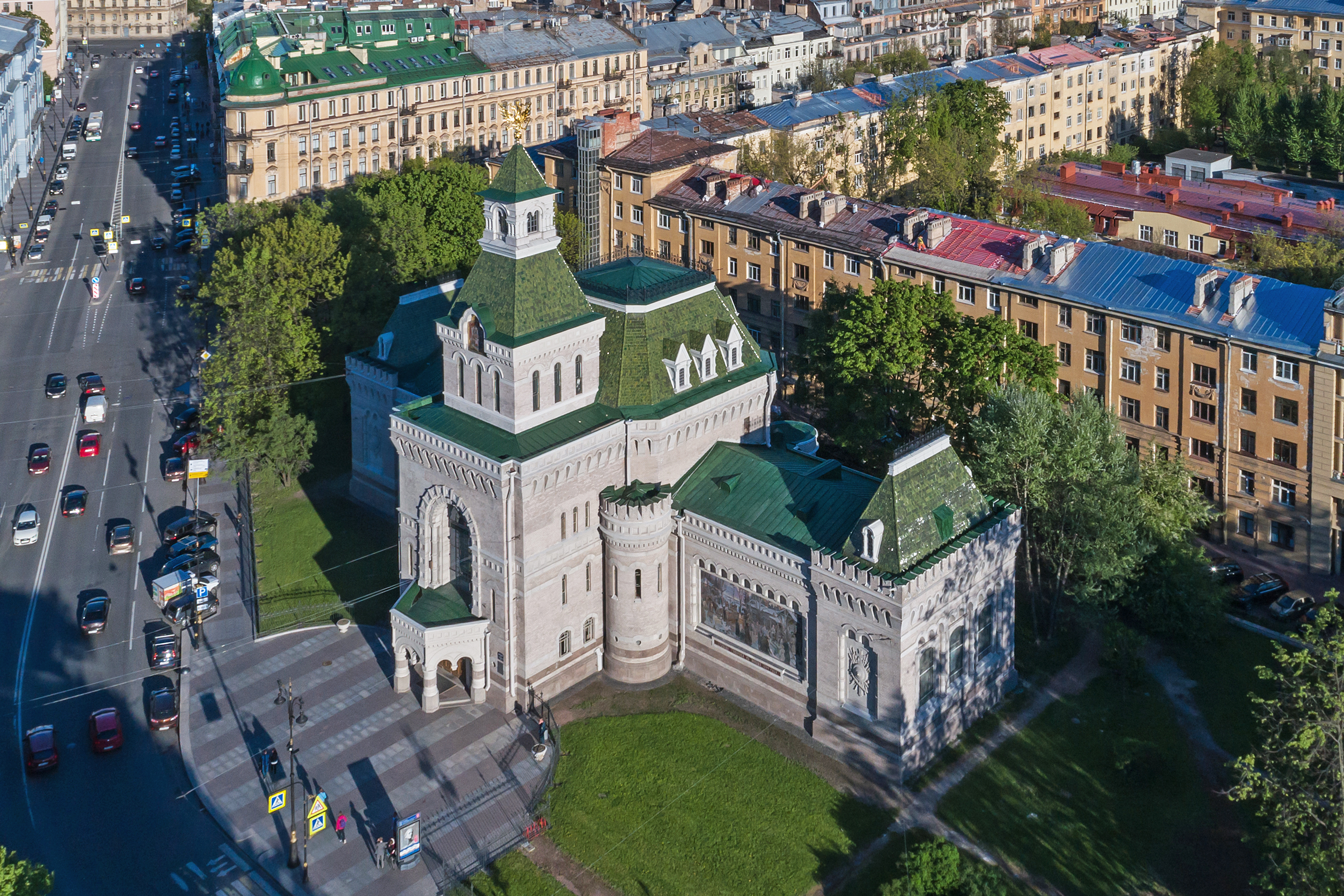
Suvorov Museum

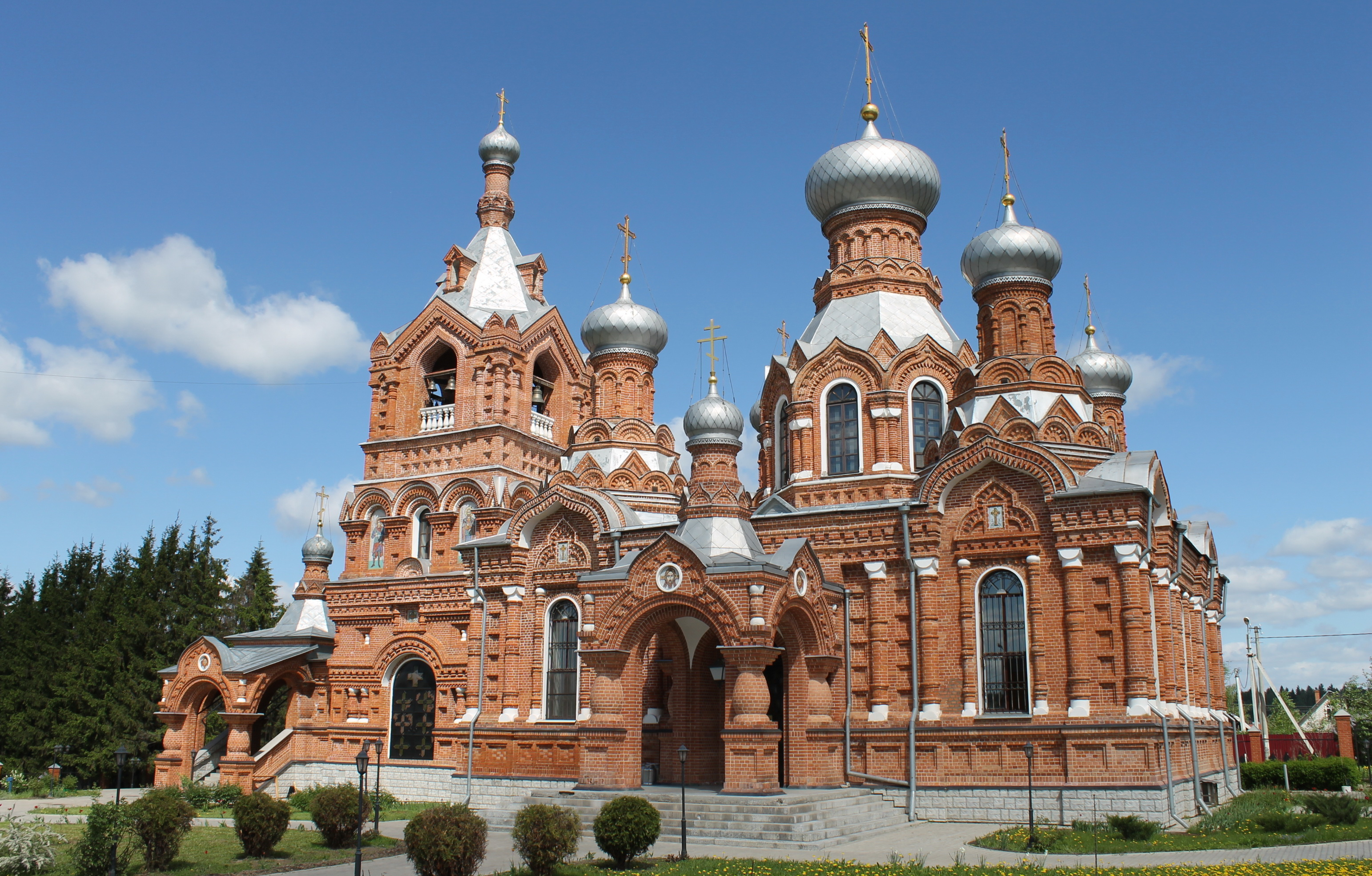
Holy Cross Church in Darna

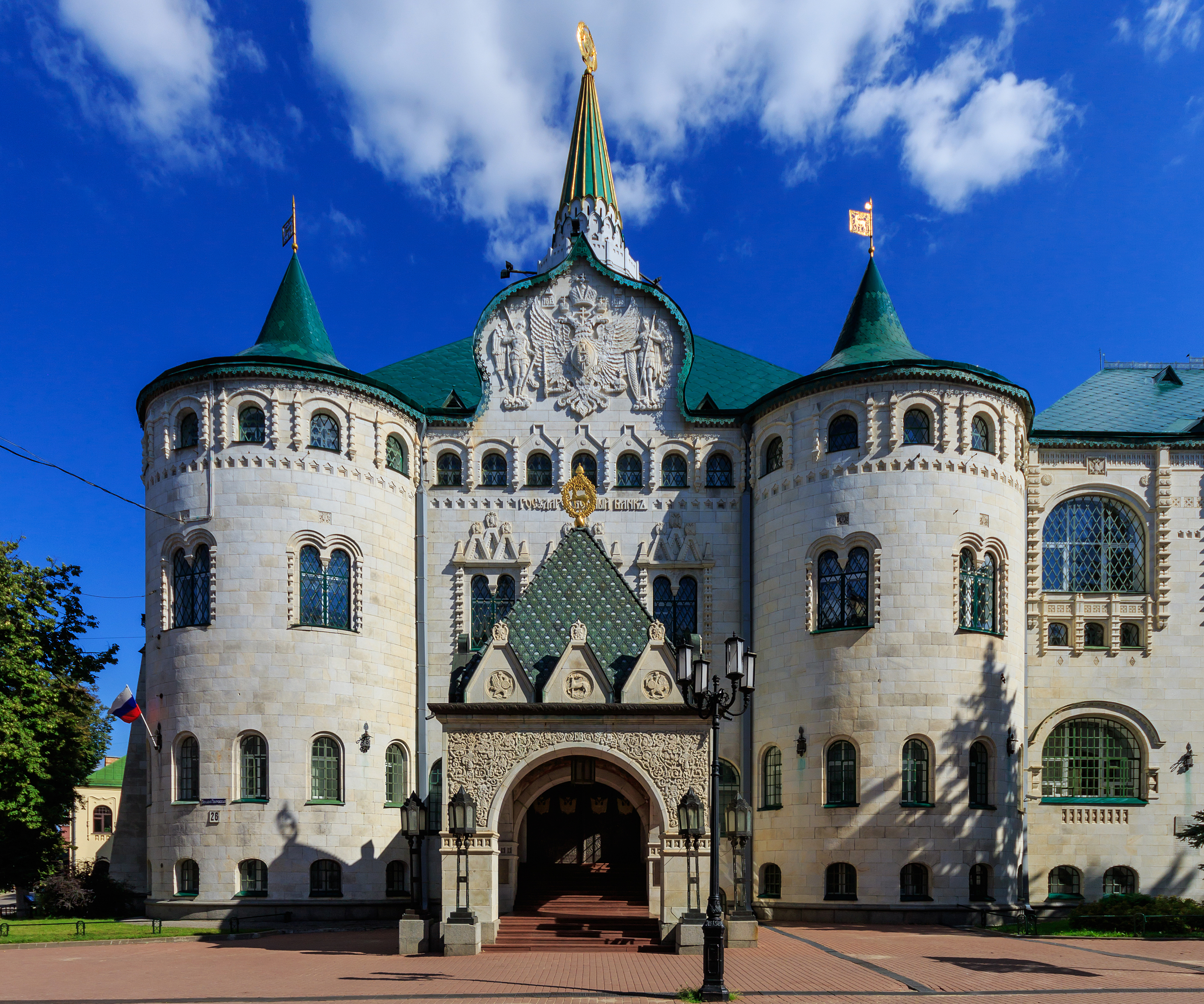
Head office of the State Bank of Russian Empire in Nizhny Novgorod

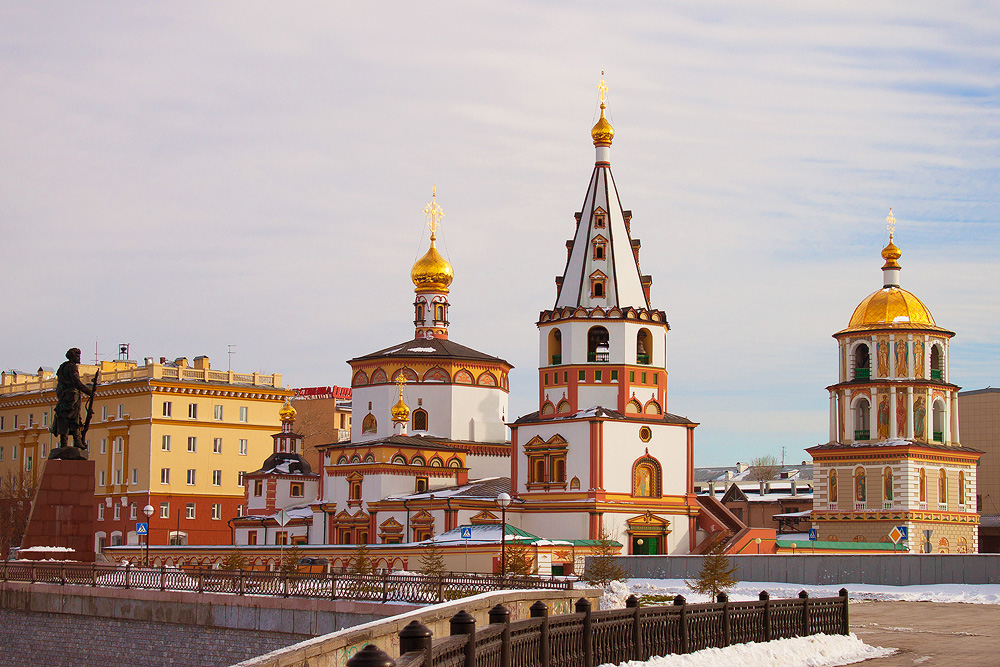
Epiphany Cathedral (1718), Irkutsk

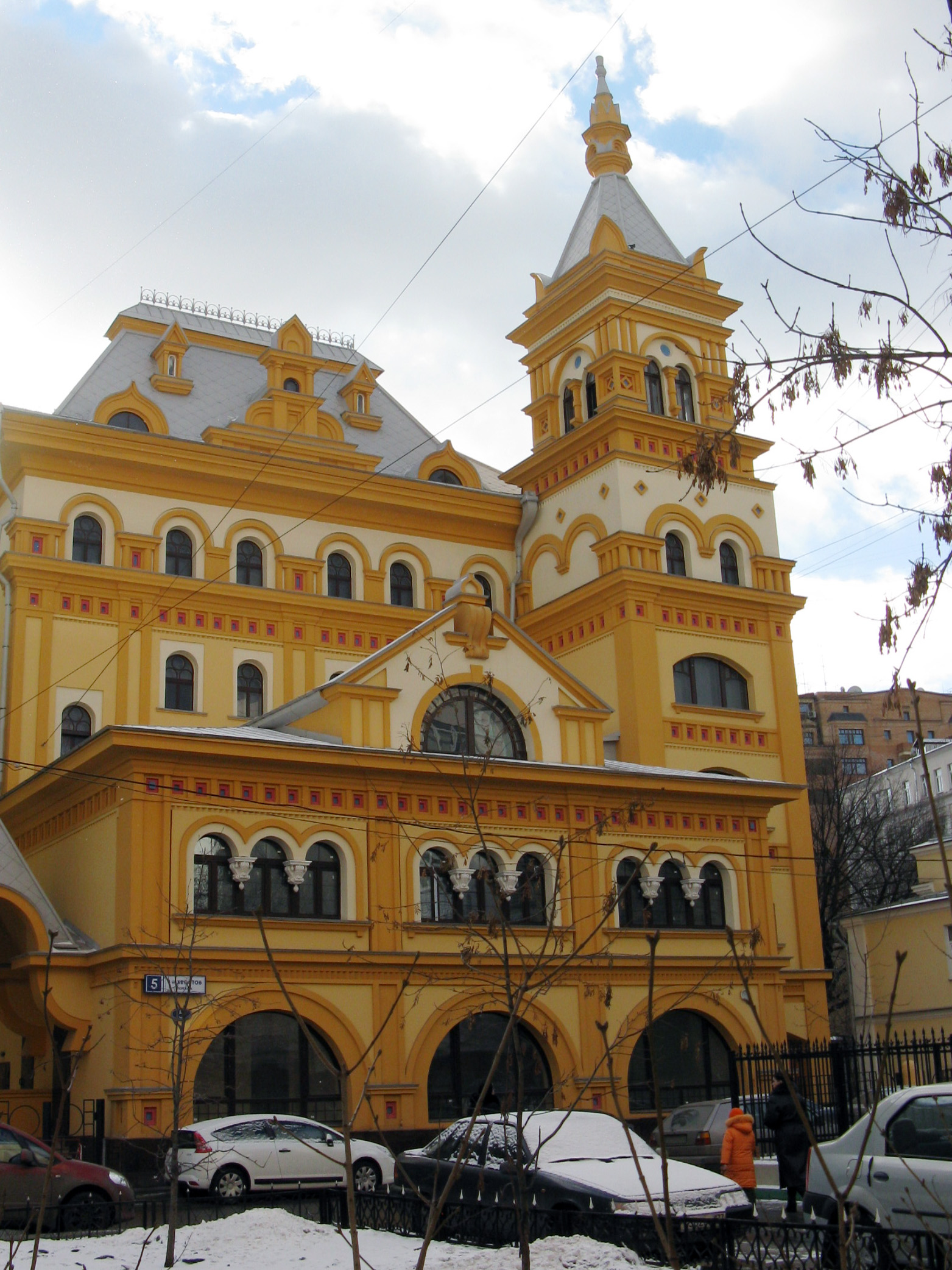
Modern House "Теремок" in Moscow

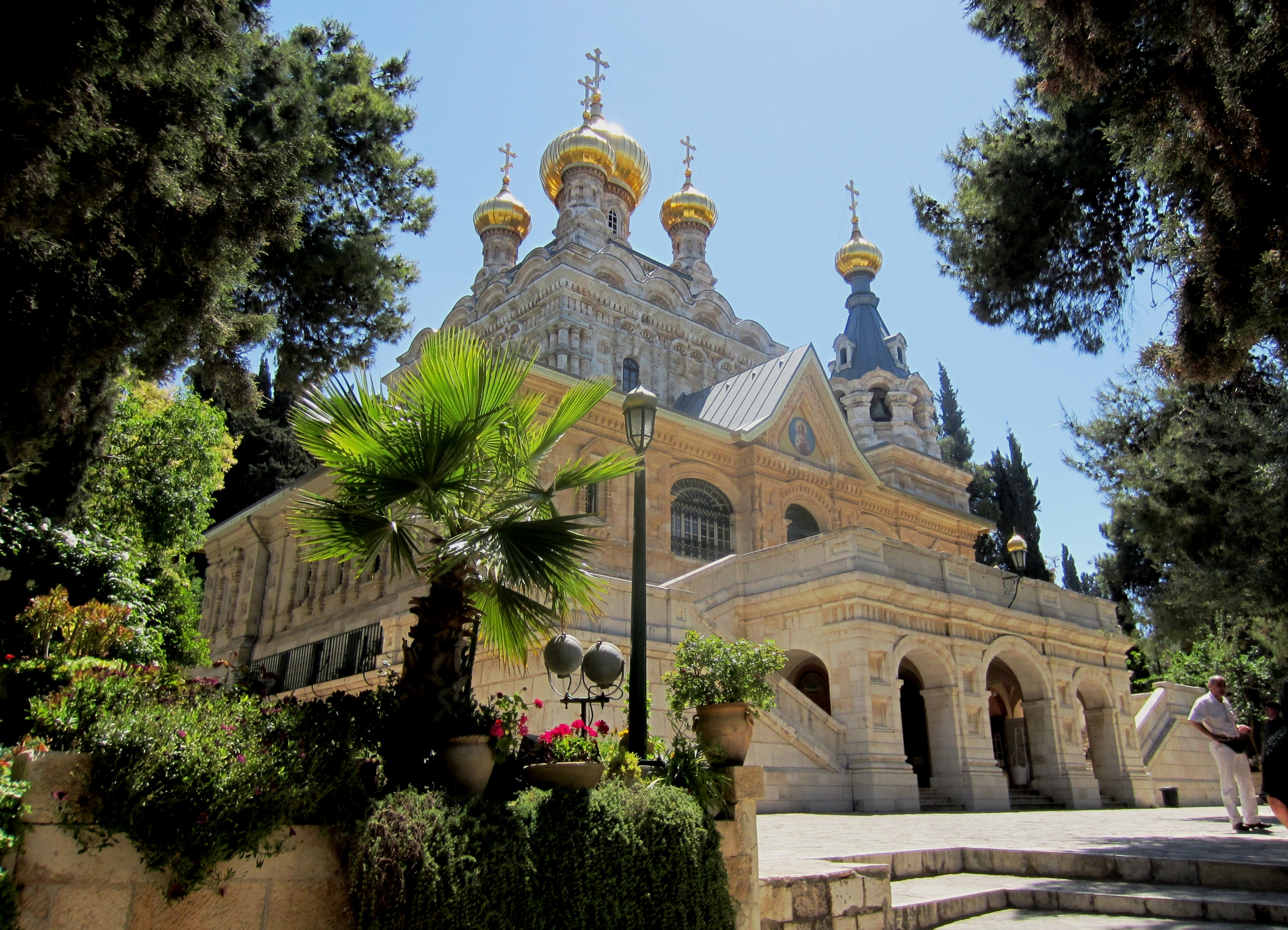
Church of Mary Magdalene, Jerusalem

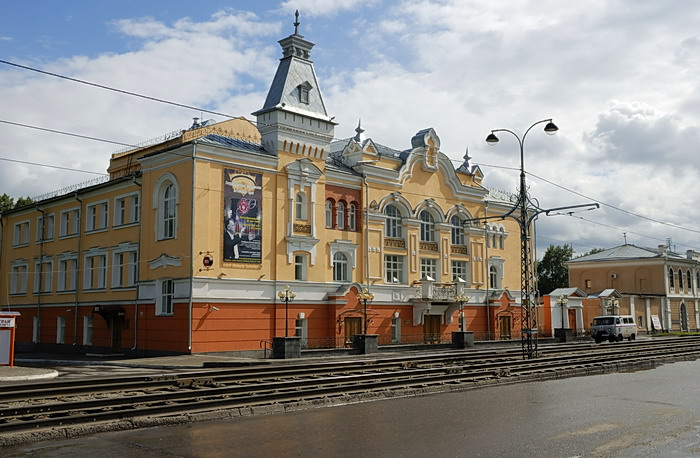
Philharmonic building, Barnaul

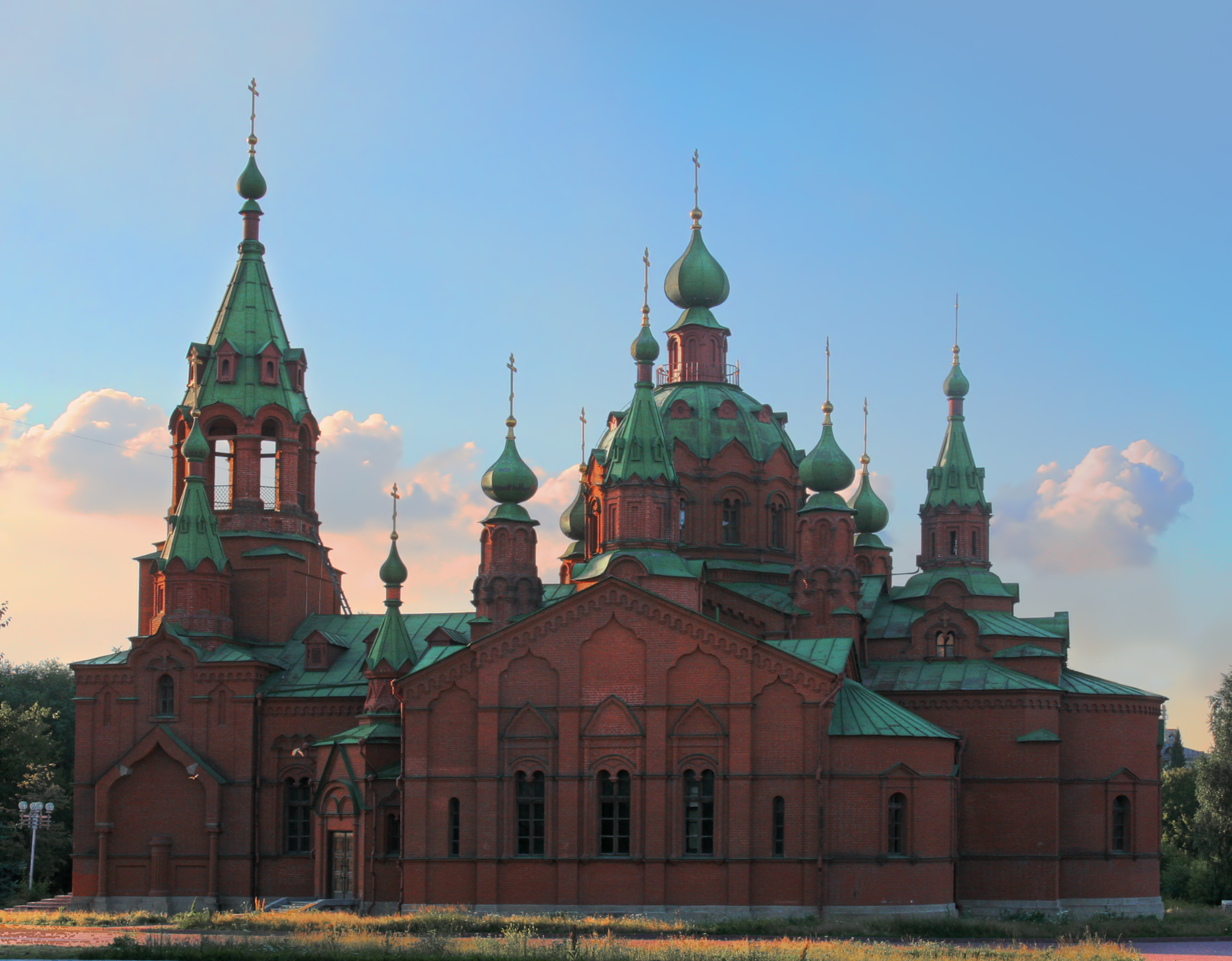
Church of Alexander Nevsky, Chelyabinsk

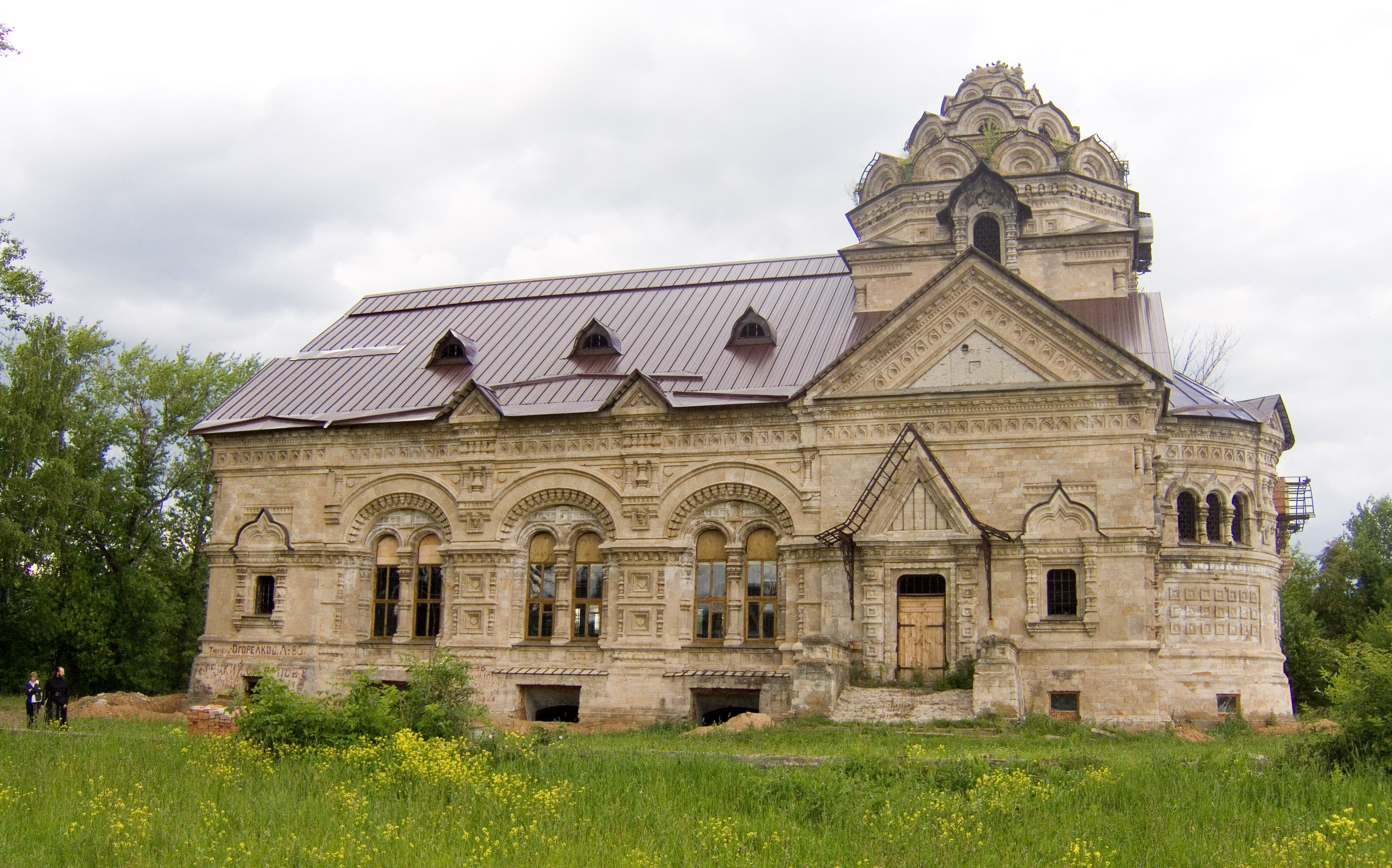
Temple of Demetrius of Thessaloniki, Lipetsk Oblast

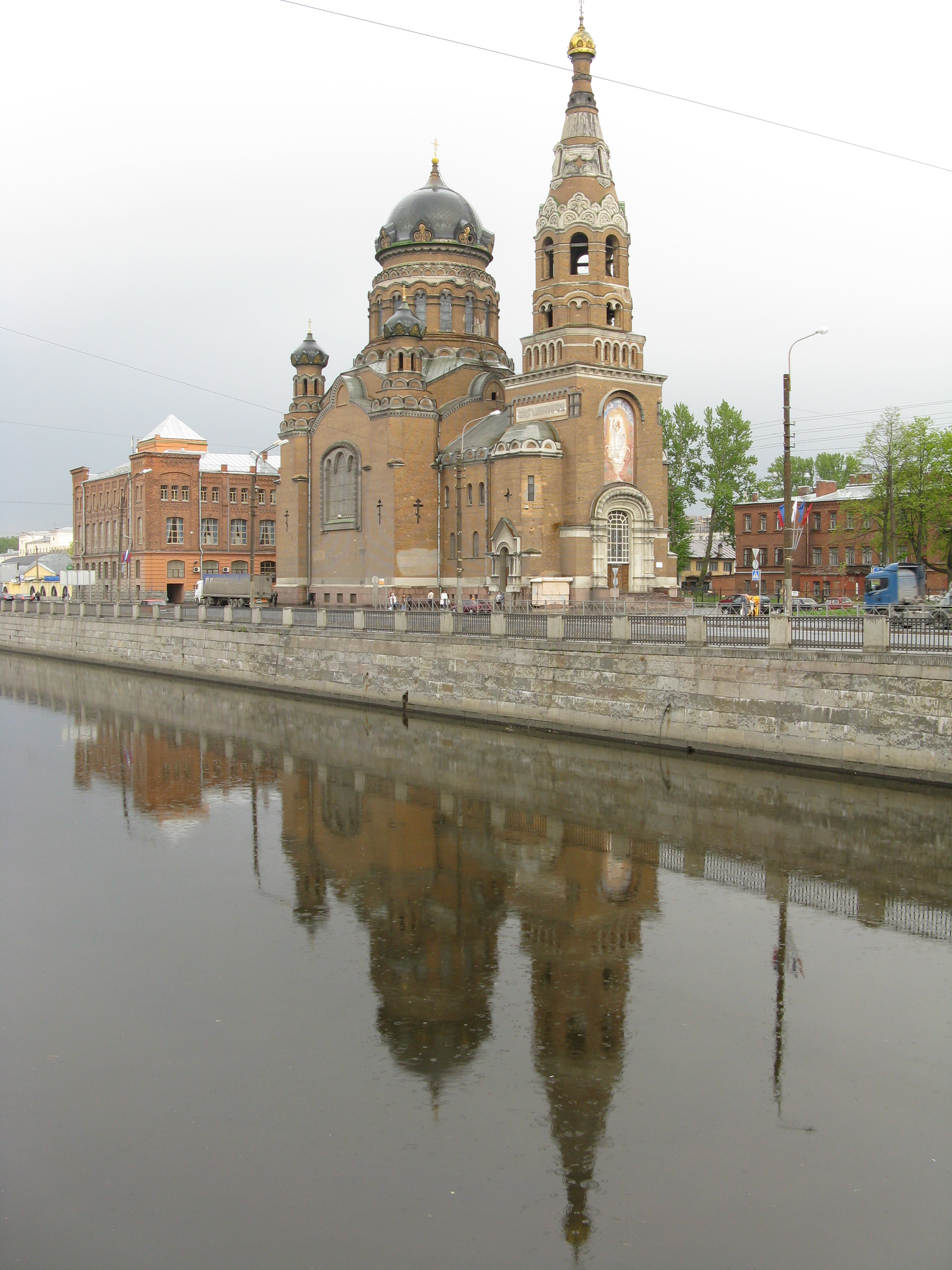
Church of Resurrection of Christ, Saint Petersburg

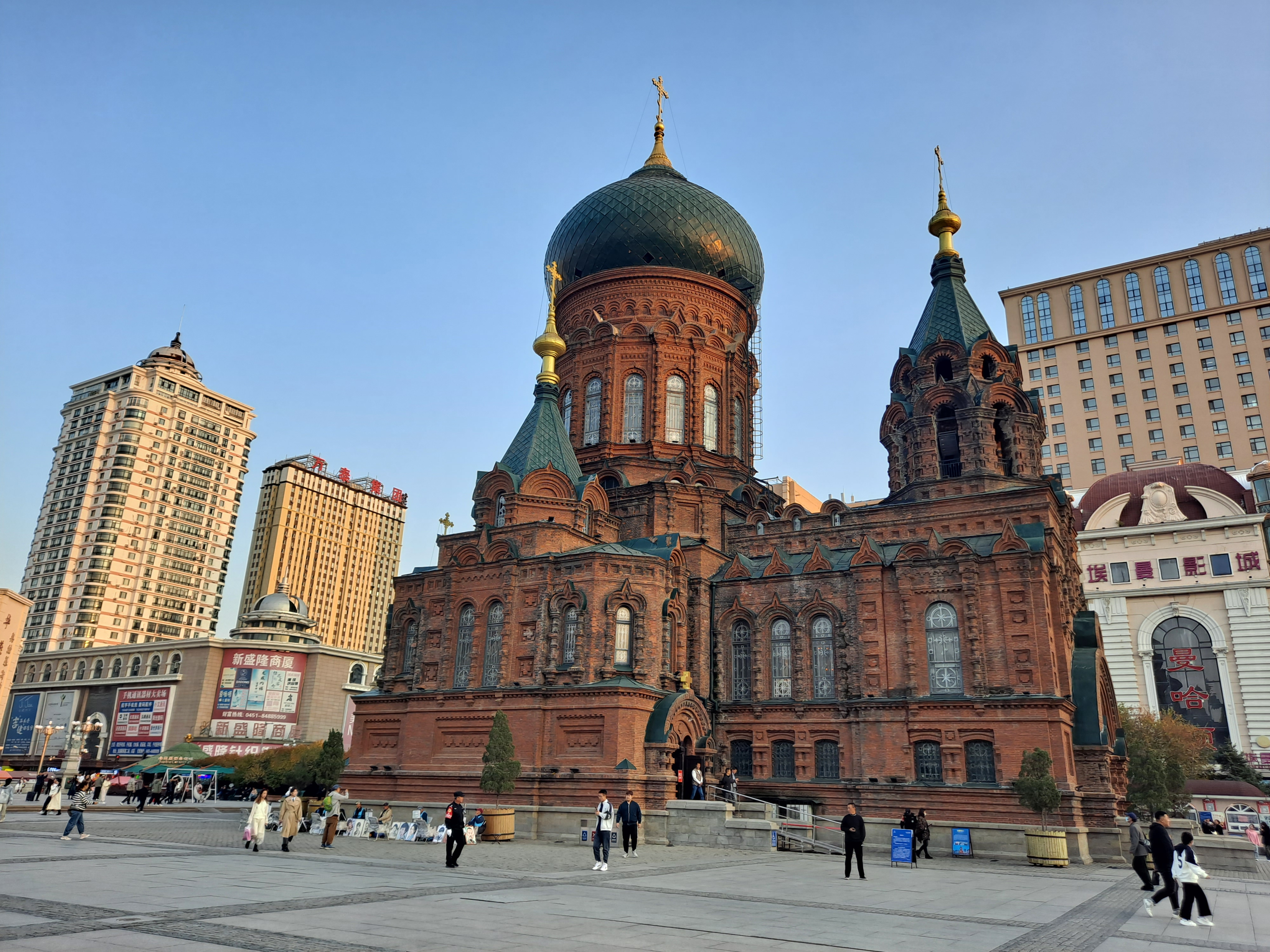
Cathedral of Holy Wisdom, Harbin

== See also ==
- Neo-Byzantine architecture in the Russian Empire
- Cathedral of Christ the Saviour (Samara)
- Russian neoclassical revival
- National Romantic style
- Postconstructivism
