= Aksakovo =

Aksakovo may refer to:

== Places in Bulgaria ==
- Aksakovo, Bulgaria, a town in Bulgaria
  - Aksakovo Municipality

== Villages in Russia ==
- Aksakovo, Vladimir Oblast
- Aksakovo, Belebeyevsky District, Republic of Bashkortostan
- Aksakovo, Yermekeyevsky District, Republic of Bashkortostan
- Aksakovo, Karmaskalinsky District, Republic of Bashkortostan
- Bolshoye Aksakovo, in Sterlitamaksky District, Bashkortostan

== See also ==
- Aksakov
