= Outbuilding of the town estate of Savva Mamontov =

Outbuilding of the town estate of S. I. Mamontov
- Флигель городской усадьбы С. И. Мамонтова
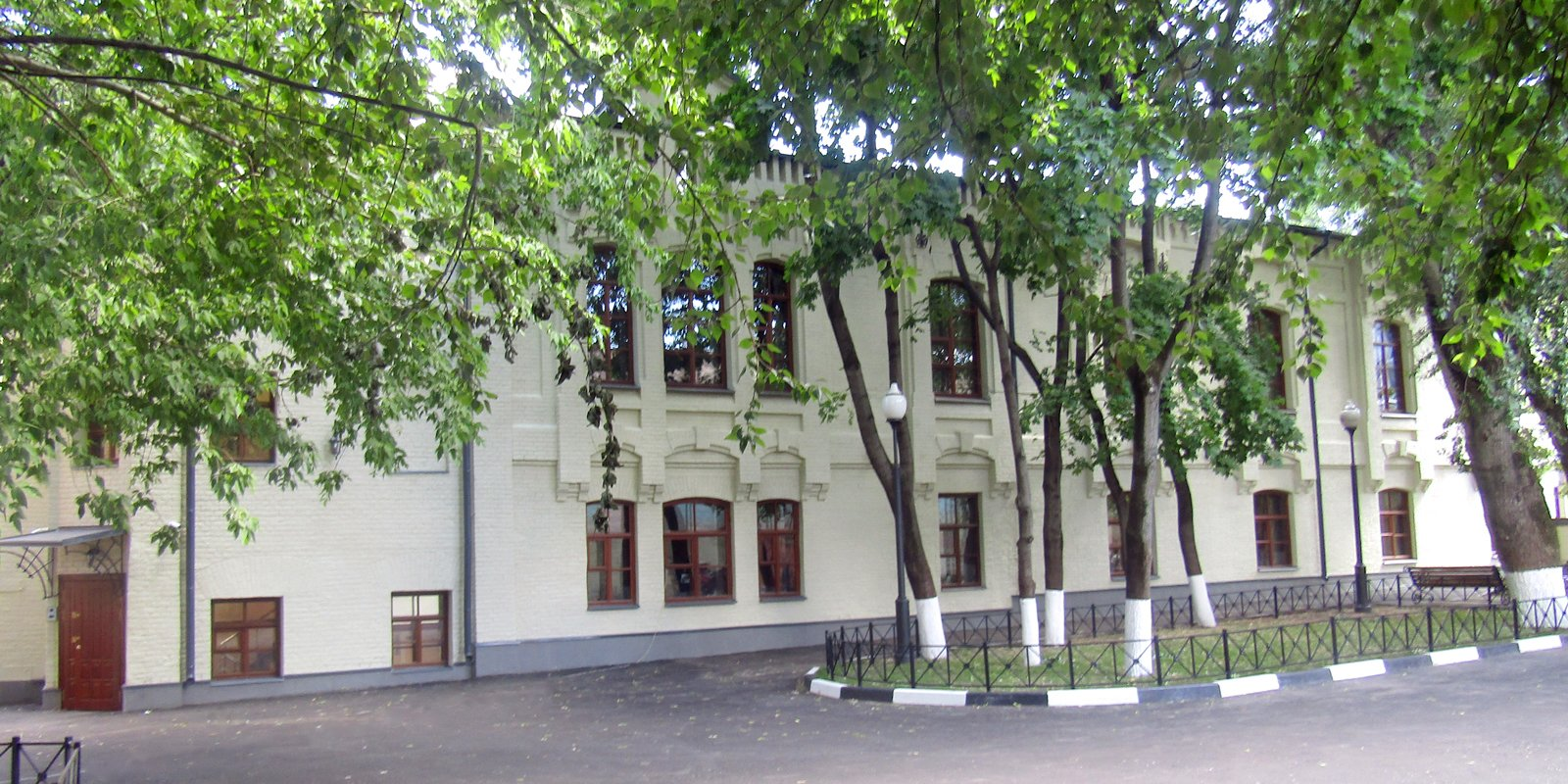

- Location within Moscow

General information
- Location: Moscow, Sadovaya-Spasskaya Street, Building 6, Building 2
- Coordinates: 55.7707°N 37.6394°E

Design and construction
- Architect: Mikhail Vrubel

The Outbuilding of the town estate of Savva Mamontov (Russian: Флигель городской усадьбы С. И. Мамонтова) is a house in Moscow on the Garden Ring (Sadovaya-Spasskaya Street, Building 6, Building 2). The only surviving building of the city manor. Built in the 1870s, it was built in the beginning of the 1890s to the design of artist Mikhail Vrubel, who after that lived there for some time. The building has the status of an object of cultural heritage of federal significance.

== History ==
The town manor on Sadovaya-Spasskaya Street was built in 1816 by court adviser Praskovya Esaulova. In 1867 it was significantly rebuilt, after which the well-known philanthropist Savva Mamontov settled there. In his salon often came Feodor Chaliapin, Viktor Vasnetsov, Mikhail Vrubel, Sergei Rachmaninoff and other figures of culture and art.

From the city estate of Mamontov to this day only the outhouse wing, built in the 1870s, has been preserved. In the years 1891–1893, the end part of the wing was built to the design of the artist Mikhail Vrubel, who defined the style of his creation as "Roman-Byzantine". In 1895–1896 the entire building was built up, in 1911 the facades were partially changed. After these changes, the architectural style of the wing can be described as "brick".

The artist M. A. Vrubel finished the facades of the wing with majolica (the decor was not preserved), a lion's mask was placed above the entrance gates. In the design of interiors that did not survive to this day, majolica was also widely used. Two majolica fireplaces and two stoves, made according to Vrubel's sketches, are now exhibited in the Abramtsevo museum-reserve.

In 1898, the estate was laid in connection with the difficult financial situation of Mamontov. In 1912, on the site of the main house, the Strahov male gymnasium was built, only a part of its capital walls were preserved.
