= Zabolotye Lake =

Lake in Moscow Oblast, Russia

- Заболотское озеро (Russian)
- Location within Moscow Oblast
- Location: Sergiyev Posad District, Moscow Oblast, Russia
- Coordinates: 56°41′08″N 38°03′41″E
- Catchment area: 355 square kilometres (137 sq mi)
- Surface area: 3.2 square kilometres (1.2 sq mi)
- Average depth: 5.0 metres (16.4 ft)
- Surface elevation: 127.8 metres (419 ft)

Zabolotye lake (Russian: Заболотское озеро) is a freshwater lake in the Sergiyev Posad District of Moscow Oblast, Russia. The lake covers 3.2 km², though some sources instead report 1.96 km². The lake's catchment area is 355 km^{2}, and reaches a maximum depth of 5m. One topographic map shows that the lake is predominantly swamp, and omits the name Zabolotye Lake.

== Geography ==
The lake is located 0.5 km from Zabolotye and 3 km from Verigino. Sulat River. a right tributary of Dubna River flows through the lake. The elevation is 127.8 m.

== History ==
The lake has a glacial origin, emerging 10,000 years ago. For millennia, silt deposits accumulated in the lake, which was once much larger than at present, leaving the Dubninsky and Ol'khovsko-Bat'kovskii boggy massifs, as well as meadows later overgrown with forest.

The lake was and is a resting place for Muscovites. One source claims that Vladimir Ilich Lenin came to rest near Zabolotoye Lake.

From the middle of the 20th century until the 1980s, water quality control measures were carried out and various reclamation projects were implemented. In the 1990s, large-scale activities on the lake ceased. In 2011, the lake and its environs came under the state program of flooding of marshes, in connection with which the construction of a dam was planned.

== Flora and fauna ==
The lake is inhabited by crucian, roach, pike, and perch. Until the 1960s, the relic seaweed of kladofora lived in the lake, but was eliminated during reclamation.

== Bibliography ==
- Вагнер Б. Б. (2007). Реки и озёра Подмосковья (in Russian). Moscow: Вече. pp. 62–63.
- Озеро Заболотское
- Государственный заказник «Озеро Заболотское и его окрестности»
- Чернова Н. Клин клином // Новая газета. 28 января 2014.
