= Aksakov =

Aksakov (Russian: Аксаков) is a surname of Russian origin. The feminine version of this surname is Aksakova (Russian: Аксакова). Notable people with the surname include:

- Alexander Aksakov (1832–1903), Russian author, editor, and parapsychologist
- Anatoly Aksakov (born 1957), Russian politician and economist
- Ivan Aksakov (1823–1886), Russian journalist and Slavophile intellectual
- Konstantin Aksakov (1817–1860), Russian writer and Slavophile intellectual
- Sergey Aksakov (1791–1859), Russian writer and critic, father of Ivan, Konstantin, and Vera
- Vera Aksakova (1819–1864), Russian writer

== See also ==
- Aksakov (crater), crater on Mercury
- Aksakov Museum, biographical museum in Ufa, Russia
- Aksakovo
