= Abramtsevo, Sergiyevo-Posadsky District, Moscow Oblast =

Abramtsevo Абрамцево
- Selo
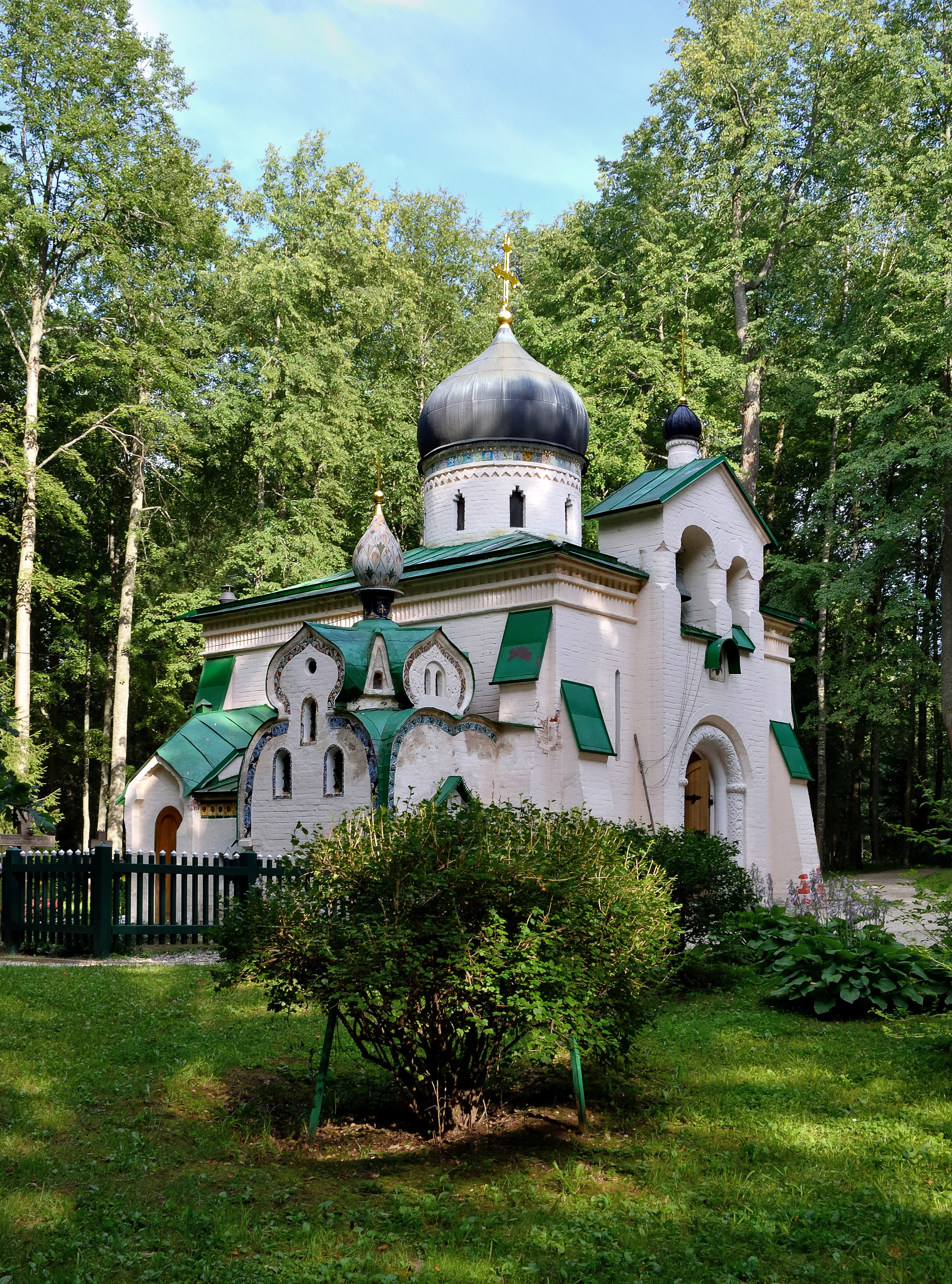
- Church of Holy Mandylion

- Location within Moscow Oblast Location within Russia
- Coordinates: 56°12′N 37°58′E
- Country: Russia
- Region: Moscow Oblast
- District: Sergiyevo-Posadsky District
- Time zone: UTC+3:00

Abramtsevo (Russian: Абрамцево) is a rural locality (a selo) in Khotkovo Urban Settlement of Sergiyevo-Posadsky District, Moscow Oblast, Russia. The population was 209 as of 2010. There are 44 streets.

== Geography ==
Abramtsevo is located 22 km southwest of Sergiyev Posad (the district's administrative centre) by road. Glebovo is the nearest rural locality.

== See also ==
Abramtsevo Colony
