= Khotkovo, Moscow Oblast =

Town in Moscow Oblast, Russia

Khotkovo Хотьково
- Town
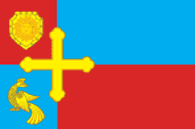
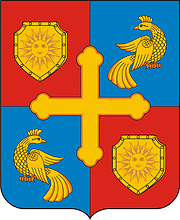
- Flag Coat of arms
- Interactive map of Khotkovo
- Location of Khotkovo Khotkovo (Moscow Oblast)
- Coordinates: 56°15′N 38°00′E
- Country: Russia
- Federal subject: Moscow Oblast
- Administrative district: Sergiyevo-Posadsky District
- TownSelsoviet: Khotkovo
- First mentioned: 1308
- Town status since: 1949
- Elevation: 195 m (640 ft)

Population (2010 Census)
  - Total: 21,505
  - Estimate (2025): 20,612 (−4.2%)

Administrative status
  - Capital of: Town of Khotkovo

Municipal status
  - Municipal district: Sergiyevo-Posadsky Municipal District
  - Urban settlement: Khotkovo Urban Settlement
  - Capital of: Khotkovo Urban Settlement
- Time zone: UTC+3 (MSK)
- Postal code: 141370–141372
- OKTMO ID: 46728000016
- Website: adm.khotkovo.ru

Khotkovo (Russian: Хотьково) is a town in Sergiyevo-Posadsky District of Moscow Oblast, Russia, located on the Moscow–Yaroslavl railway, 60 kilometers (37 mi) northeast of Moscow and 11 kilometers (6.8 mi) southwest of Sergiyev Posad, the administrative center of the district. Population: 21,505 (2010 census); 20,957 (2002 census); 23,343 (1989 Soviet census); 20,000 (1974).

== History ==
It was first attested in 1308. It was granted a town status in 1949.

== Administrative and municipal status ==
Within the framework of administrative divisions, it is, together with twenty-nine rural localities, incorporated within Sergiyevo-Posadsky District as the Town of Khotkovo. As a municipal division, the Town of Khotkovo is incorporated within Sergiyevo-Posadsky Municipal District as Khotkovo Urban Settlement.

== Economy ==
The town's main industrial enterprises are Electroizolit, an electrical insulation manufacturer; Gorbunoskaya weaving mill; and a carving workshop.

== Education ==
Education facilities include a number of secondary schools, Abramtsevo Art and Industry College, and a music school.

== Sights ==
The town is the site of a monastery, founded by the parents of St. Sergius of Radonezh (picture). The 19th-century artists' community of Abramtsevo is situated within three miles from Khotkovo.
