= Savva Mamontov =

Russian industrialist and patron of the arts (1841–1918)

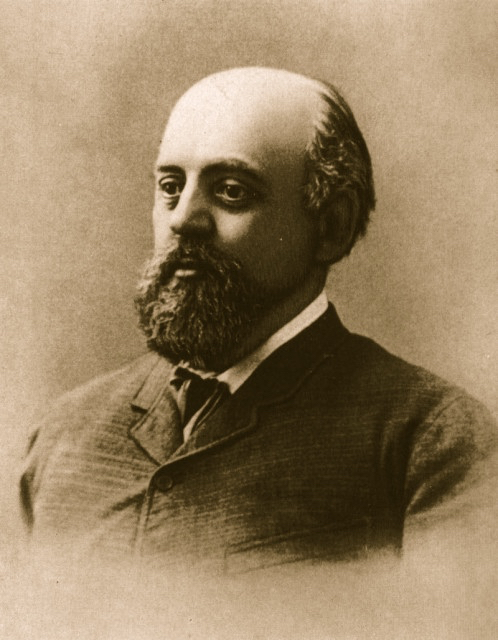
Savva Mamontov, 1880–1890

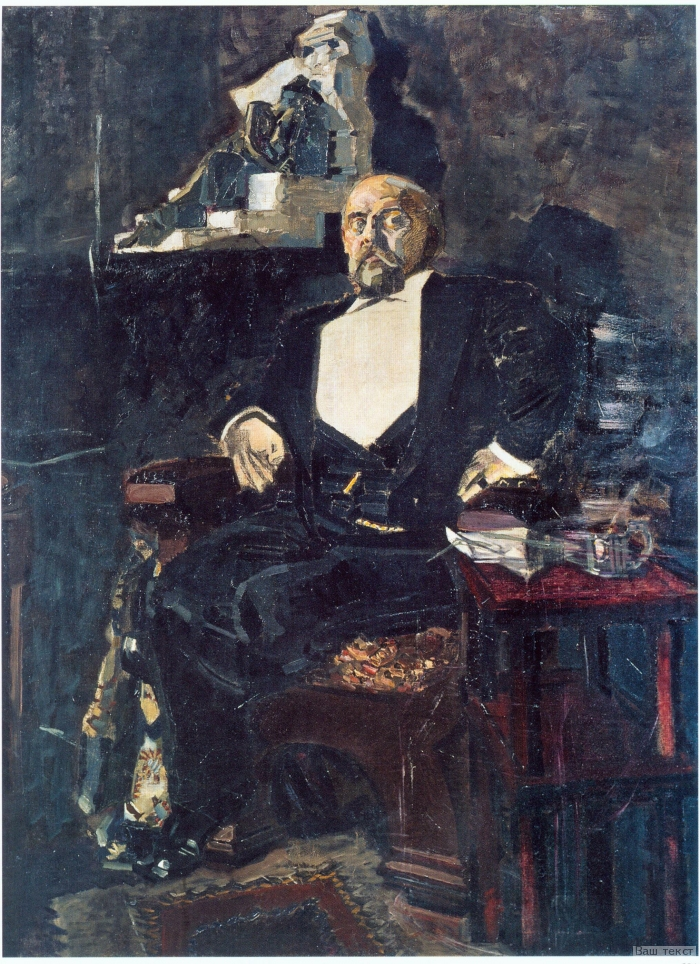
Portrait by Mikhail Vrubel, Tretyakov Gallery (1897)

Savva Ivanovich Mamontov (Russian: Савва Иванович Мамонтов, IPA: [ˈsavə ɪˈvanəvʲɪtɕ ˈmaməntəf]; 15 October [O.S. 3 October] 1841, Yalutorovsk – 6 April 1918, Moscow) was a Russian industrialist, merchant, entrepreneur and patron of the arts.

== Business career ==
He was a son of the wealthy merchant and industrialist Ivan Feodorovich Mamontov and Maria Tikhonovna (Lakhitina). In 1841, the family moved to Moscow. From 1852, he studied in St. Petersburg, and later at the Moscow University. In 1862 his father sent him to Baku to engage in business with the elder Mamontov's Trans-Caspian Trade Partnership.

In 1864, Savva visited Italy where he began to take lessons in singing. There he was introduced to the daughter of Moscow merchant Grigory Sapozhnikov, 17-year-old Elizabeth, who subsequently became his wife. The wedding took place in 1865 at the Kireevo estate, near Khimki, just northwest of Moscow.

Upon his father's death in 1869, he succeeded to his share in the Moscow-Yaroslavl Railway, and at the recommendation of his father's friend, Fedor Vasilyevich Chizhov, he was elected a director of the company. In 1872 he was elected its chairman.

The extension of the railway from Sergiev Posad to Yaroslavl, begun in 1868, was opened for traffic on 18 February (2 March N.S.) 1870. A narrow-gauge branch from Uroch station to Vologda was opened on 20 June (2 July) 1872, followed by the Alexandrov-Karabanovo branch in 1877 and the Yaroslavl-Kostroma line in 1887. Mamontov also supervised the construction of the Donets Coal Railway (now Donets Railway), which connected a network of sparsely populated mining villages with the port of Mariupol, between 1875 and 1878.

== Patron of the arts ==
In 1870, Mamontov purchased the Abramtsevo Estate, located north of Moscow, and founded there an artists' colony which included most of the best Russian artists of the late 19th century and the beginning of the 20th century, such as Konstantin Korovin, Rafail Levitsky, Mikhail Nesterov, Ilya Repin, Vasily Polenov, Valentin Serov, Mikhail Vrubel, the brothers Vasnetsov, sculptors Viktor Hartmann and Mark Antokolsky, as well as various others. The colony of artists who were hosted there during the 1870s and 1880s sought to recapture the quality and spirit of medieval Russian art. Several workshops were set up there to produce handmade furniture, ceramic tiles, and silks imbued with traditional Russian imagery and themes.

Mamontov also patronised the Russian Private Opera, which discovered the great Russian bass, Feodor Chaliapin, and supported the Russian opera composers, Pyotr Tchaikovsky, Nikolai Rimsky-Korsakov, Alexander Borodin, Modest Musorgsky, and many others. Drama and opera on Russian folklore themes (e.g., Rimsky-Korsakov's The Snow Maiden) were produced at Abramtsevo by the likes of Konstantin Stanislavsky, with sets contributed by the brothers Vasnetsov, Mikhail Vrubel, and other distinguished artists. The Russian Private Opera was Mamontov's main contribution to the arts. Mamontov acted as a stage director, a conductor and a teacher of singing. The success of the Private Opera in the provinces was followed by a triumph in Moscow.

== Downfall ==
Mamontov's world came crashing down when, in 1899, an audit revealed that his factories had been improved since 1890 with funds from the railway, a course of action that was contrary to law. He was compelled to resign as chairman of the railway on 30 July (11 August) 1899. (The railway company was taken over by the Imperial Ministry of Treasury on 1 (14) April 1900.) Unable to pay his creditors, he began to sell off assets to raise funds, but this course was brought to an abrupt end on 11 (23) September 1899 when he was arrested and lodged in Taganka Prison in Moscow. Mamontov was unjustly accused of embezzlement; he was released from custody early in 1900, and at his trial in June 1900, defended by Fyodor Plevako, he was acquitted. Acquittal did not avert his financial ruin, for on 7 (20) July 1900 he was declared insolvent by the Moscow District Court, and his property was sold at public auction.

Savva Ivanovich Mamontov died in Abramtsevo after a long illness on 6 April 1918.

== Bibliography ==
- Arenzon, E. Savva Mamontov. Moskva, "Russkaia kniga", ©1995. ISBN 5-268-01445-5 (in Russian)
- Bakhrevskii, V. A: Savva Mamontov. Moscow, Molodaia Gvardiia, 2000, 513 p. [15 ill.] ISBN 5-235-02403-6 (in Russian)
- Haldey, Olga (2010). Mamontov's Private Opera : the search for modernism in Russian theater . Bloomington: Indiana University Press. ISBN 978-0-253-35468-6.

== Quotations ==
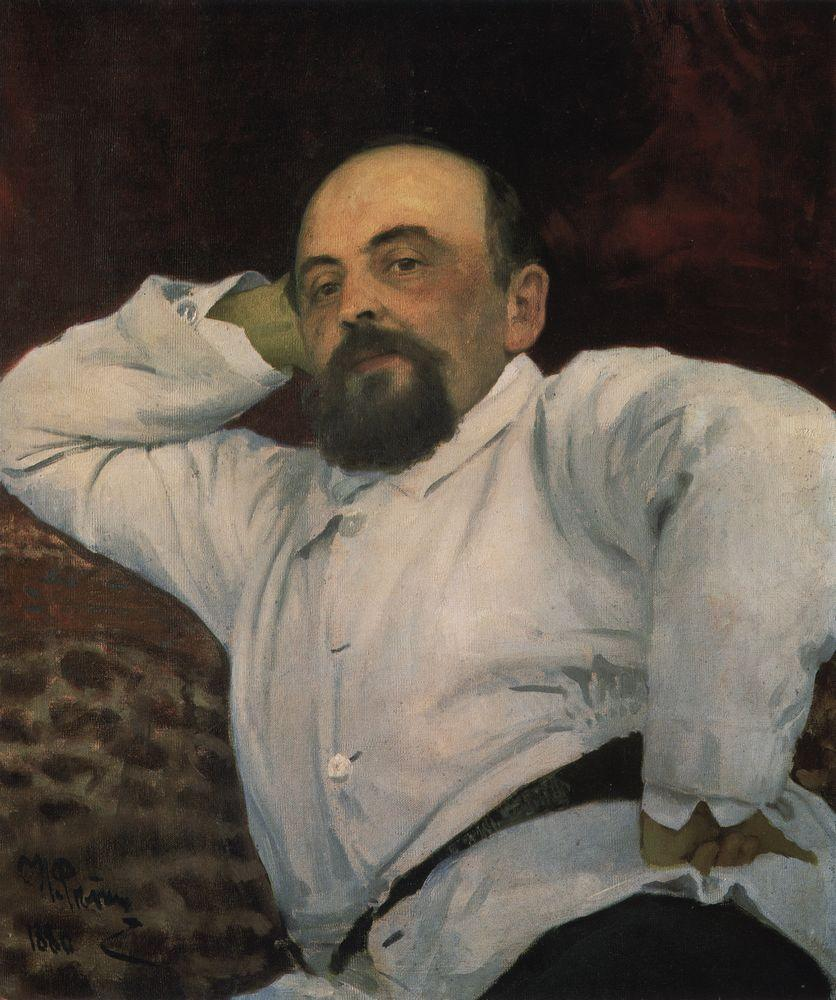
Savva Mamontov. Portrait by Ilya Repin (1880)

- "I was a rich man, that's true, but I gave up everything since I believed that money is for the people and not people for the money. Who needs money when there is no life?" (Savva Mamontov: from his Diary)
- "Contemporaries called Savva Mamontov "Savva the Magnificent" likening him to Duke Lorenzo de' Medici who was known as Lorenzo the Magnificent. But Savva Mamontov was more than a patron of arts and letters, he was a businessman as well, and his contribution to both the national economy and the arts was equally great." (The Russian Cultural Navigator)

== Popular culture ==
Third Eye Blind's song "Monotov's Private Opera" from the album Ursa Major is inspired by Mamontov's private opera.

== See also ==
- Russian opera
