= Ivan Ropet =

Russian architect (1845–1908)

- Иван Ропет
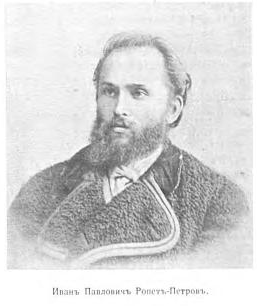
- Born: 24 August [O.S. 12 August] 1845; Petergof, Russia
- Died: 25 December 1908 (aged 63); Saint Petersburg, Russia
- Education: Member Academy of Arts; Full Member Academy of Arts (1893)
- Alma mater: Imperial Academy of Arts (1871)
- Known for: Architecture
- Awards: Big Gold Medal of the Imperial Academy of Arts (1871)

Ivan Nikolayevich Petrov (Russian: Иван Николаевич Петров; 24 August [O.S. 12 August] 1845 – 25 December [O.S. 12 December] 1908), better known by his pseudonym Ivan Pavlovich Ropet (Russian: Иван Павлович Ропет), was a Russian architect widely regarded as the originator of the Russian Revival in architecture, which is sometimes called the Ropet Style after him. His work was hailed by Vladimir Stasov as "the future of our architecture".

== Biography ==
Ivan Nikolayevich Petrov was born on 24 August [O.S. 12 August] 1845, in Petergof. He was raised in the family of his uncle and he changed his patronymic to Pavlovich, after his uncle. Ropet studied at the Imperial Academy of Arts under Alexey Gornostaev, pioneer of Russian Revival and a master of tented roof design. He took the pseudonym Ropet in the form of an exotic anagram of his real surname. Together with Viktor Hartmann, Ropet aspired to revive a truly national style of architecture, based primarily on ornate wooden huts of rural Russia.

Basically, Ropet's circle propagated the same theories of the romantic nationalism as The Five did in regard to Russian music. Between 1874 and 1880, they brought out a series of albums of Russian Architecture Motifs which made their work known throughout Russia. Most of his works were in timber; one of the few still standing is the bath at Abramtsevo.

Ropet made use of the Victorian craze for world's fairs to propagate his ideas abroad. He designed the Russian pavilions at the World's Fairs in Paris (1878) and Chicago (1893). In Russia, he was responsible for the influential polychrome pavilions at the Polytechnic Exposition of 1872 in Moscow and the Nizhny Novgorod Fair of 1896.

Among the more permanent works ascribed to Ropet are the Bassin Apartment House in St. Petersburg and the Russian Embassy in Tokyo. He died on 25 December [O.S. 12 December] 1908 in St. Petersburg.

== Works ==
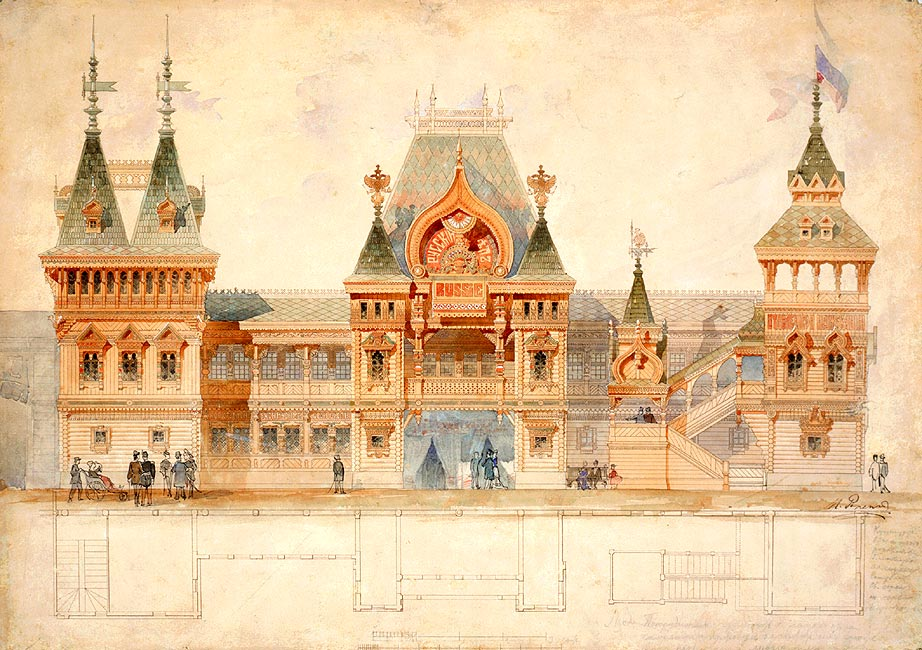
Ropet's design of Russia's pavilion at the 1878 World Fair in Paris

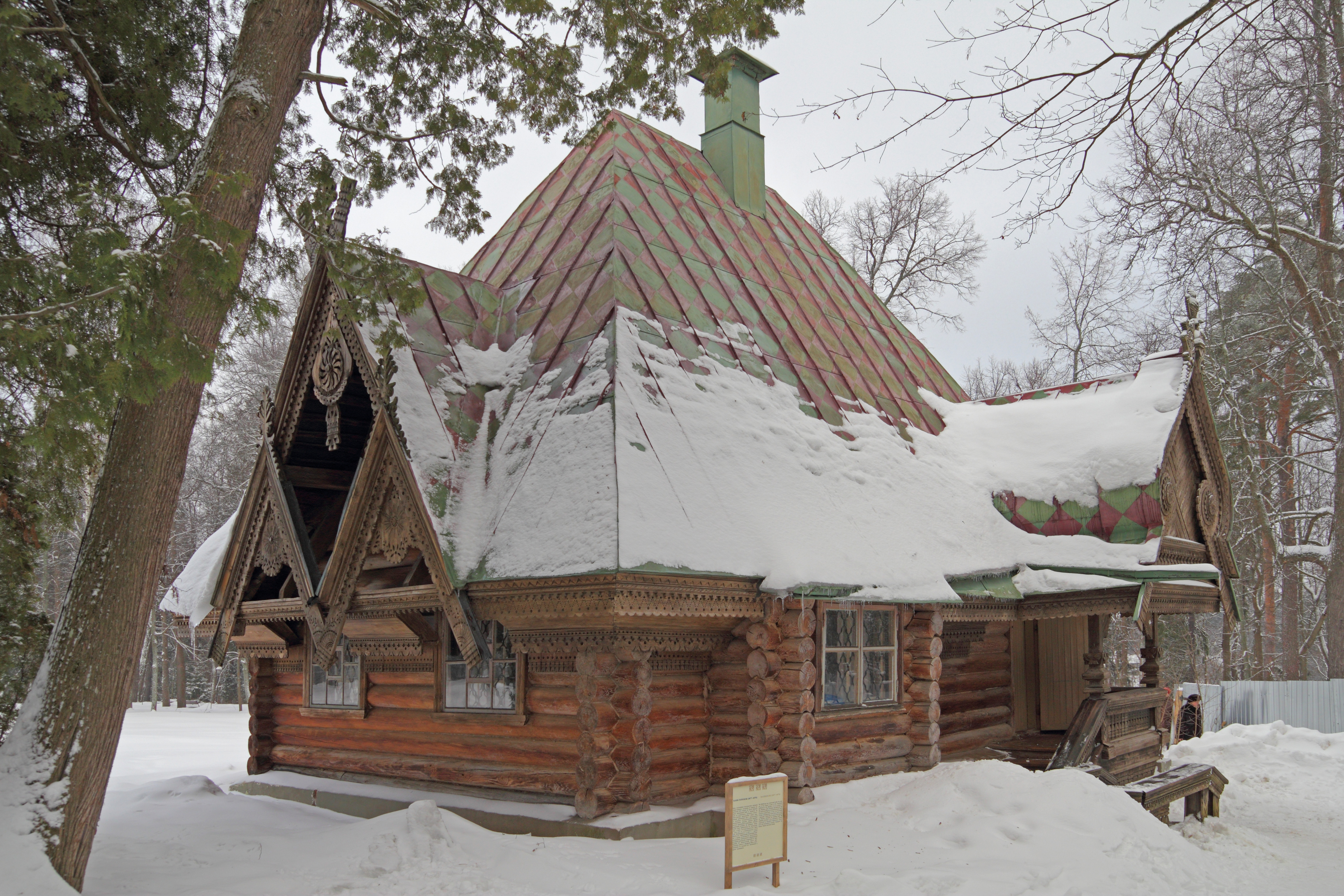
Teremok (Abramtsevo Colony)

== Sources ==
- Kondakov, S. N. (1915). Юбилейный справочник Императорской Академии художеств. 1764-1914 (in Russian). Vol. 2. p. 381.
- Pechyonkin, I. Ye. (2015). "Ропет". In Kravets, S. L. (ed.). Большая российская энциклопедия. Том 21: Пустырник — Румчерод (in Russian). Большая российская энциклопедия. p. 651. ISBN 978-5-85270-365-1. Archived from the original on 25 January 2025.
