= Abramtsevo Colony =

Abramtsevo
- Country Estate and Artists' Colony
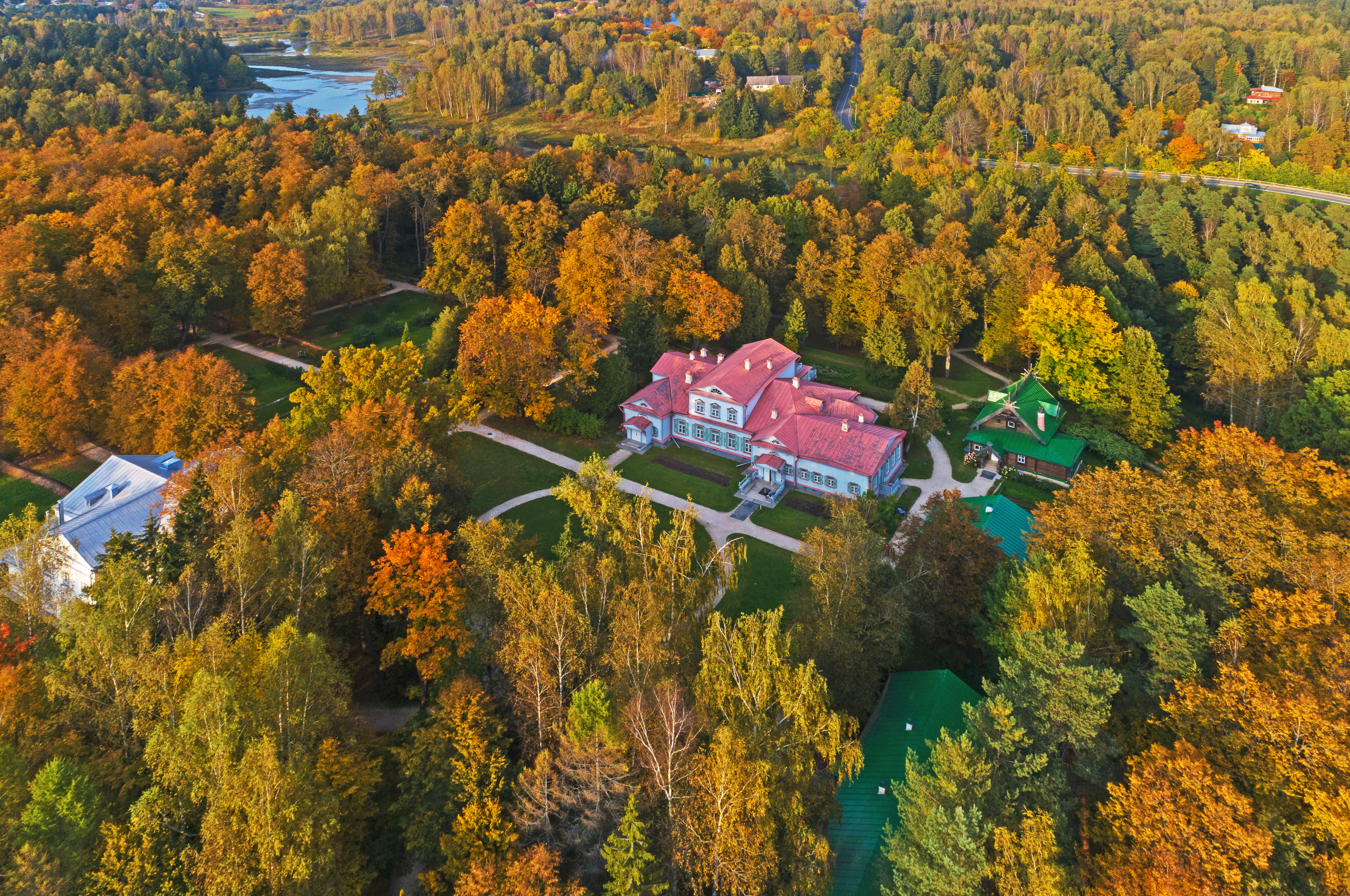
- Abramtsevo manor house
- Interactive map of Abramtsevo
- Location in Moscow Oblast Location in European Russia
- Coordinates: 56°14′03″N 37°58′06″E
- Country: Russia
- Oblast: Moscow Oblast
- District: Sergiyevo-Posadsky District
- Website: abramtsevo.net/eng/

Abramtsevo (Russian: Абра́мцево) is a former country estate and now museum-reserve located north of Moscow, in the proximity of Khotkovo, that became a centre for the Slavophile movement and an artists' colony in the 19th century. The estate is located in the village of Abramtsevo, in Sergiyevo-Posadsky District of Moscow Oblast. The Abramtsevo Museum-reserve site is an object of cultural heritage in Russia.

== History ==
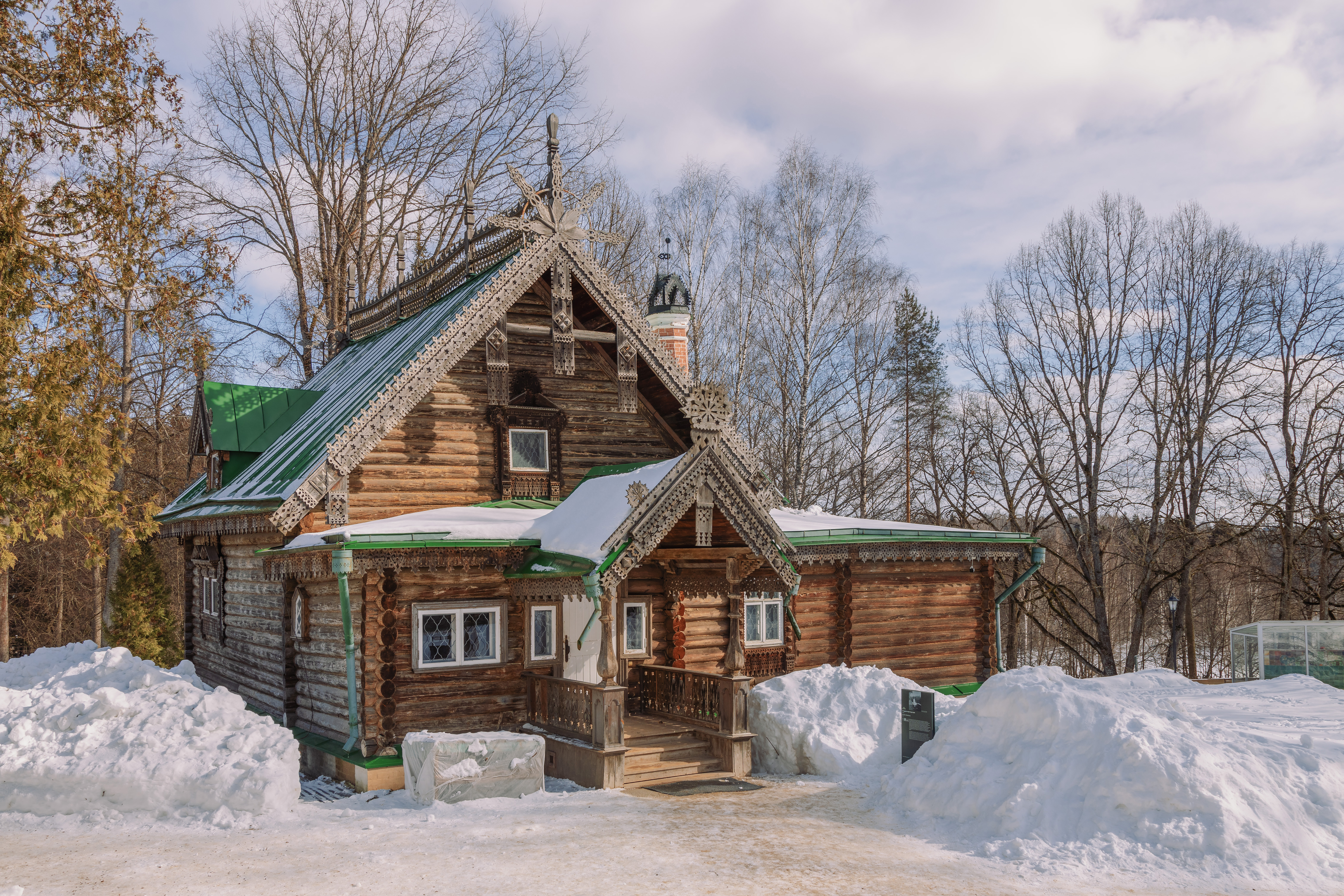
Wooden studio with Mikhail Vrubel's collection of the folk art

Originally owned by the author Sergei Aksakov, other writers and artists — such as Nikolai Gogol — at first came there as his guests. Under Aksakov, visitors to the estate discussed ways of ridding Russian art of Western influences to revive a purely national style. In 1870, eleven years after Aksakov's death, it was purchased by Savva Mamontov, a wealthy industrialist and patron of the arts.

Under Mamontov, Russian themes and folk art flourished there. During the 1870s and 1880s, Abramtsevo hosted a colony of artists who sought to recapture the quality and spirit of medieval Russian art in a manner parallel to the Arts and Crafts movement in Great Britain. Several workshops were set up there to produce handmade furniture, ceramic tiles, and silks imbued with traditional Russian imagery and themes.

Working together in a cooperative spirit, the artists Vasily Polenov and Viktor Vasnetsov designed a plain but picturesque church, with murals painted by Polenov, Vasnetsov and his brother, a gilded iconostasis by Ilya Repin and Mikhail Nesterov, and folklore-inspired sculptures by Viktor Hartmann and Mark Antokolsky. Towards the turn of the 20th century, drama and opera on Russian folklore themes (e.g., Rimsky-Korsakov's The Snow Maiden) were produced in Abramtsevo by the likes of Konstantin Stanislavsky, with sets contributed by Vasnetsov, Mikhail Vrubel, and other distinguished artists.

On August 12, 1977, by the decree of the Council of Ministers of Soviet Russia, the Abramtsevo Museum-Estate was transformed into the State Historical, Artistic and Literary Museum-Reserve Abramtsevo. In 1995, it was classified as cultural heritage monument of federal significance.

== Museum ==
Abramtsevo is now open to the public and tourists can wander along the many paths through the surrounding forest and cross the wooden bridges that served as an inspiration for the artists at the Abramtsevo Colony. They can also visit many of the buildings to see works produced by the artists at the colony, e.g., a wooden bathhouse in the shape of a traditional dwelling of Ancient Rus, designed by Ivan Ropet, and the House on Chicken Legs, a fairy-tale abode of an evil witch, Baba Yaga, designed by Vasnetsov. One building, the main "manor," is said to have been the model for the estate in which Anton Chekhov set The Cherry Orchard.

== Gallery ==
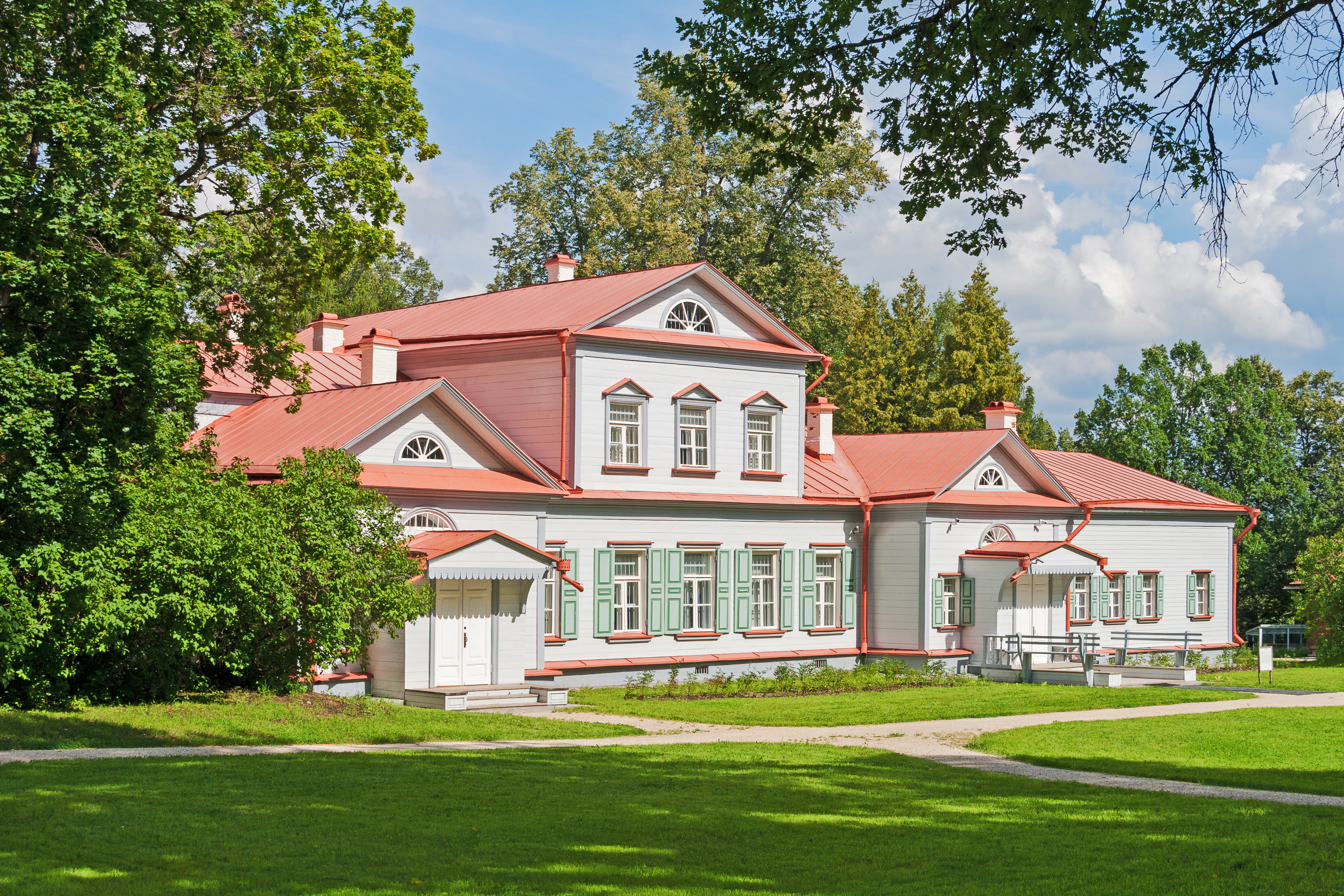
Manor House

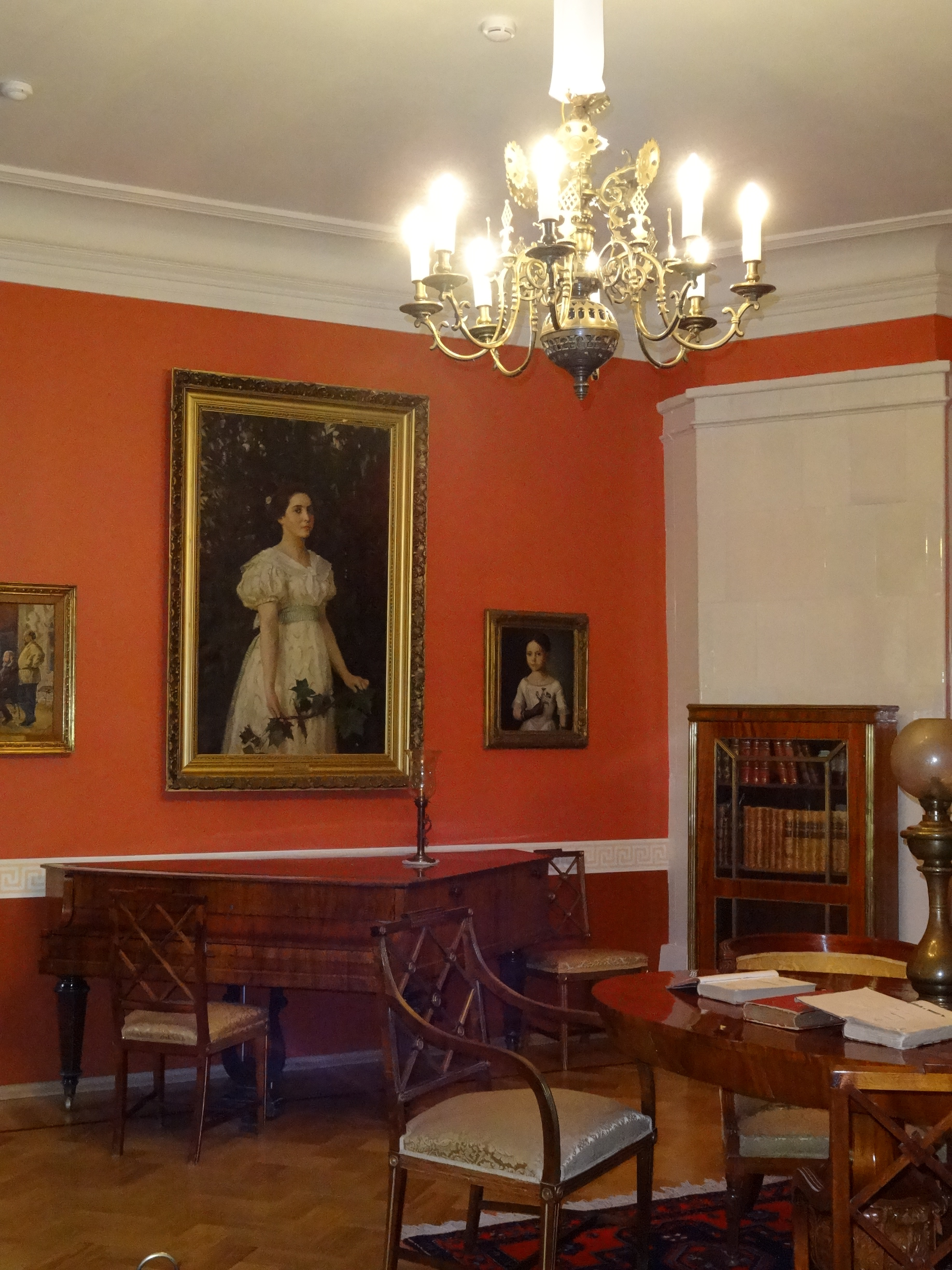
The crimson living room

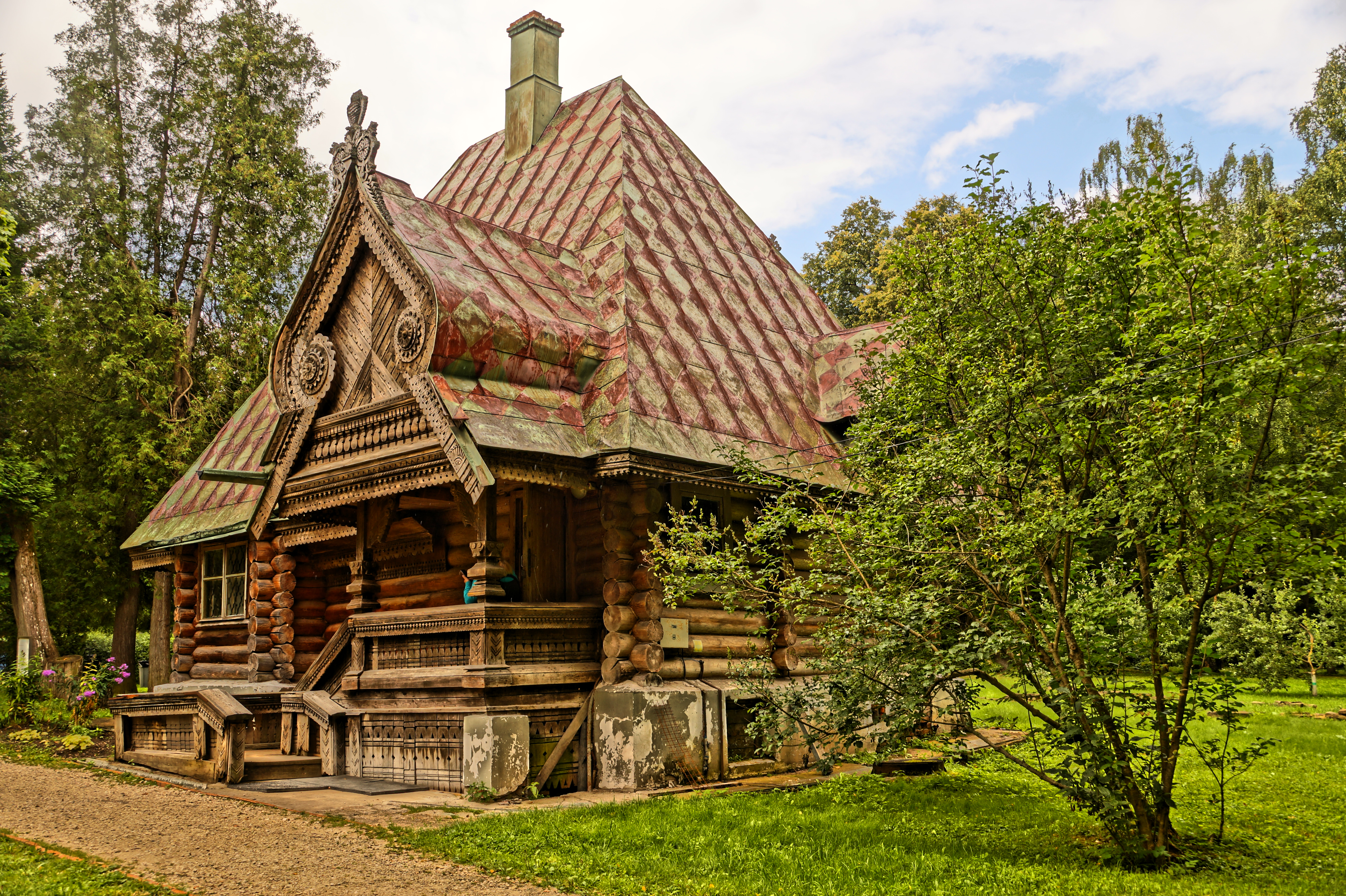
The bathhouse-teremok

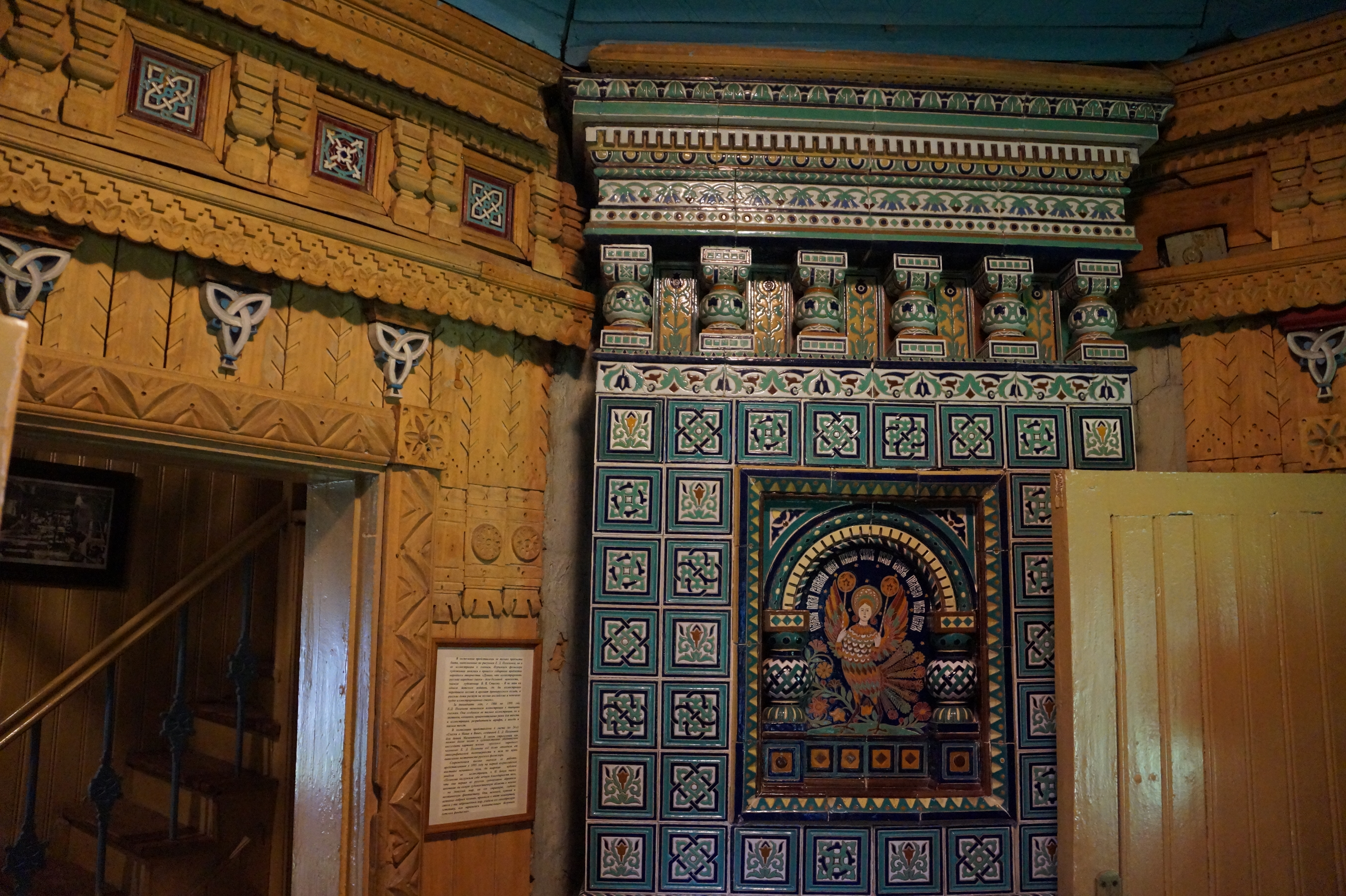
Stove with tiles in the bathhouse

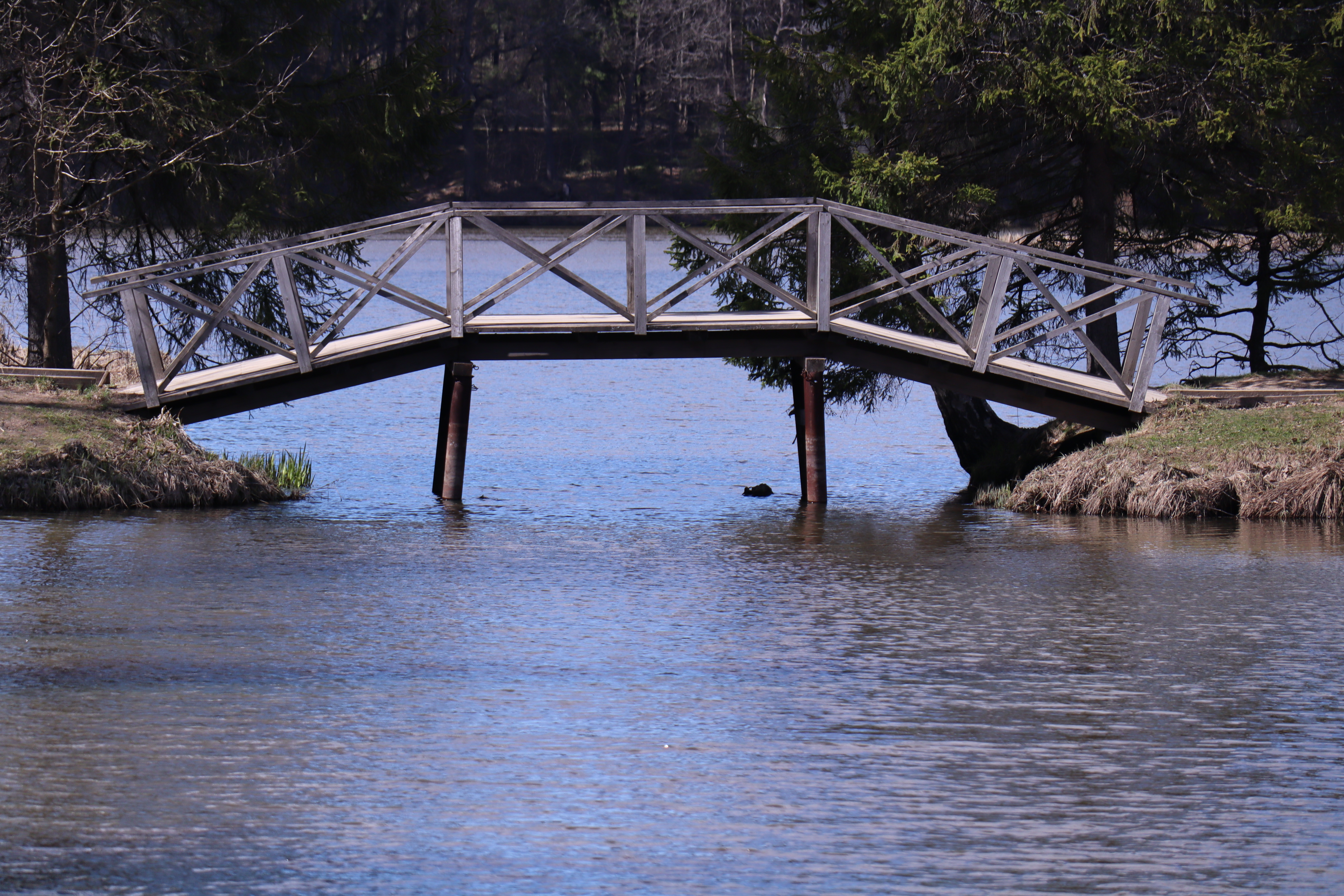
Vorya river

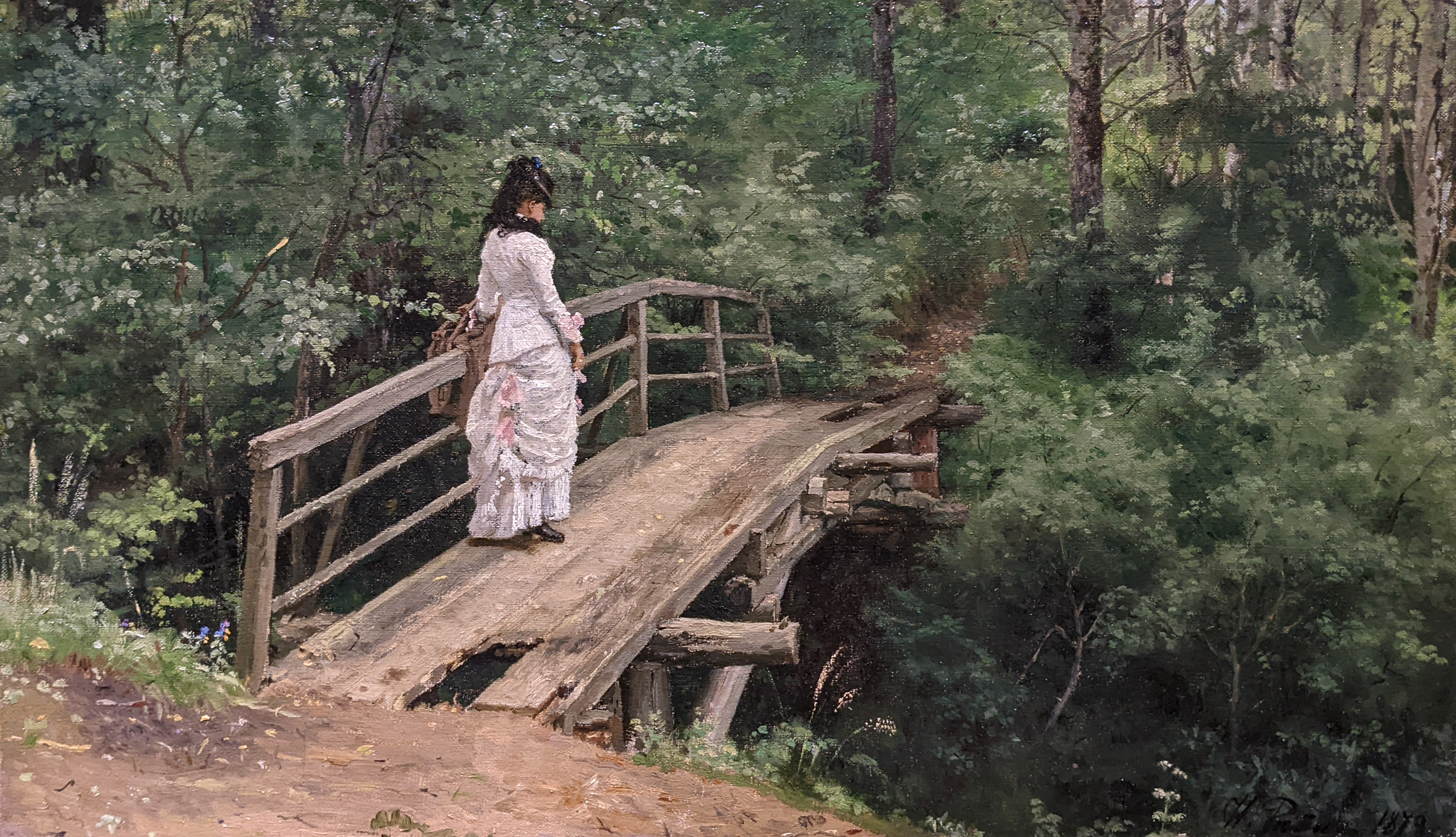
Ilya Repin, "Summer landscape", 1879

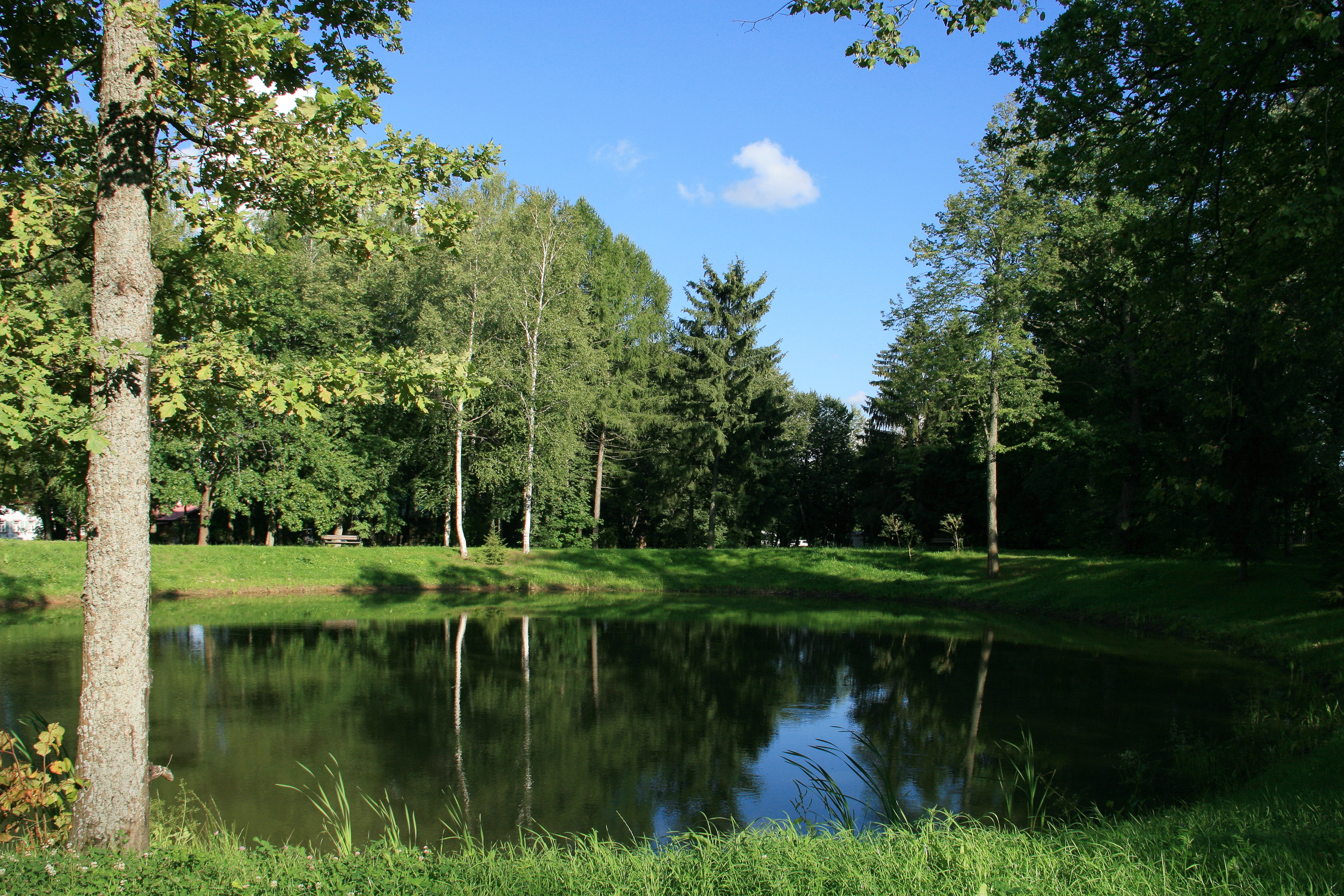
The upper pond in the park

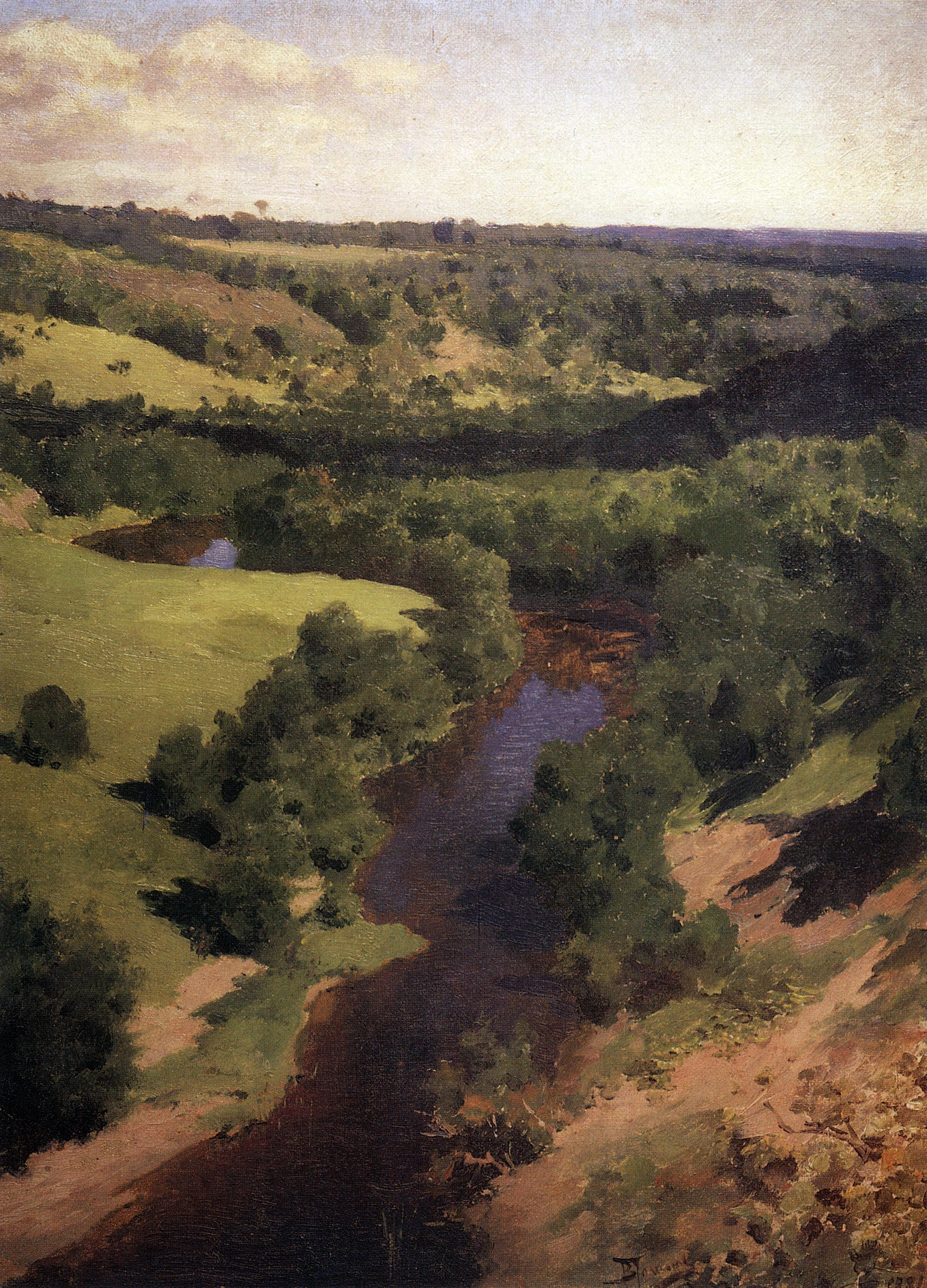
Vasily Polenov, "Vorya river", 1881

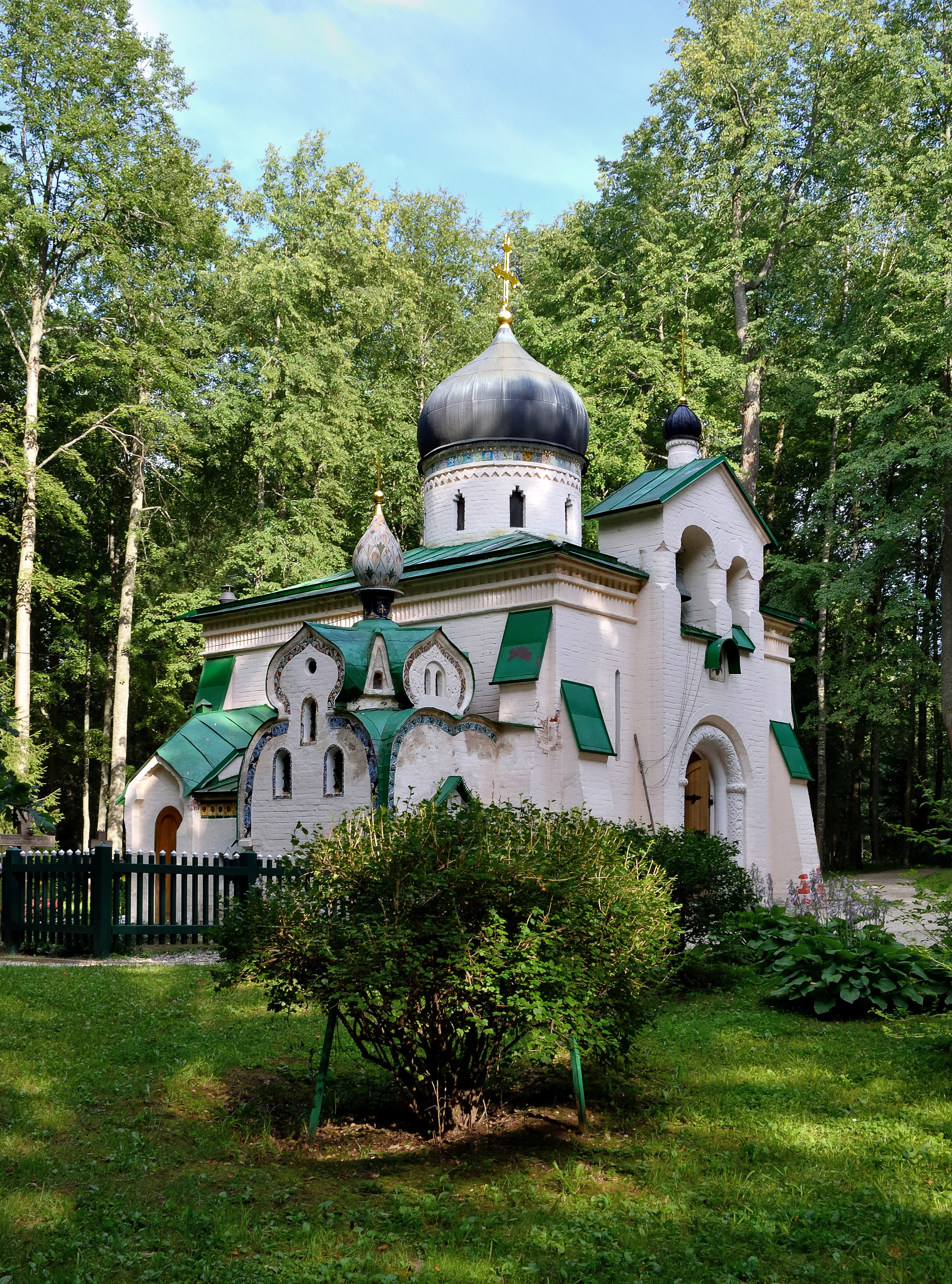
Church of the Savior of the Holy Image

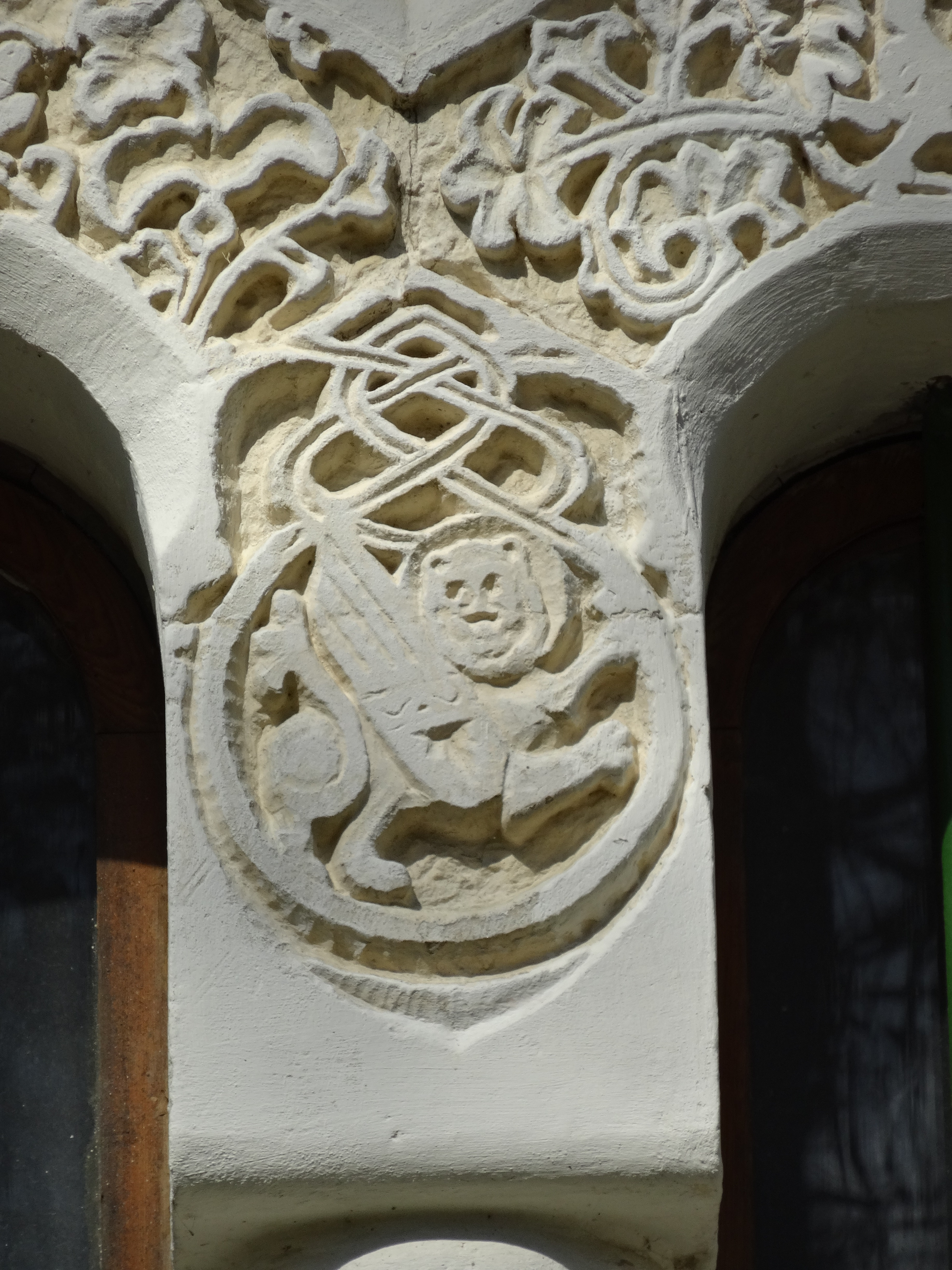
Church facade, stone carving

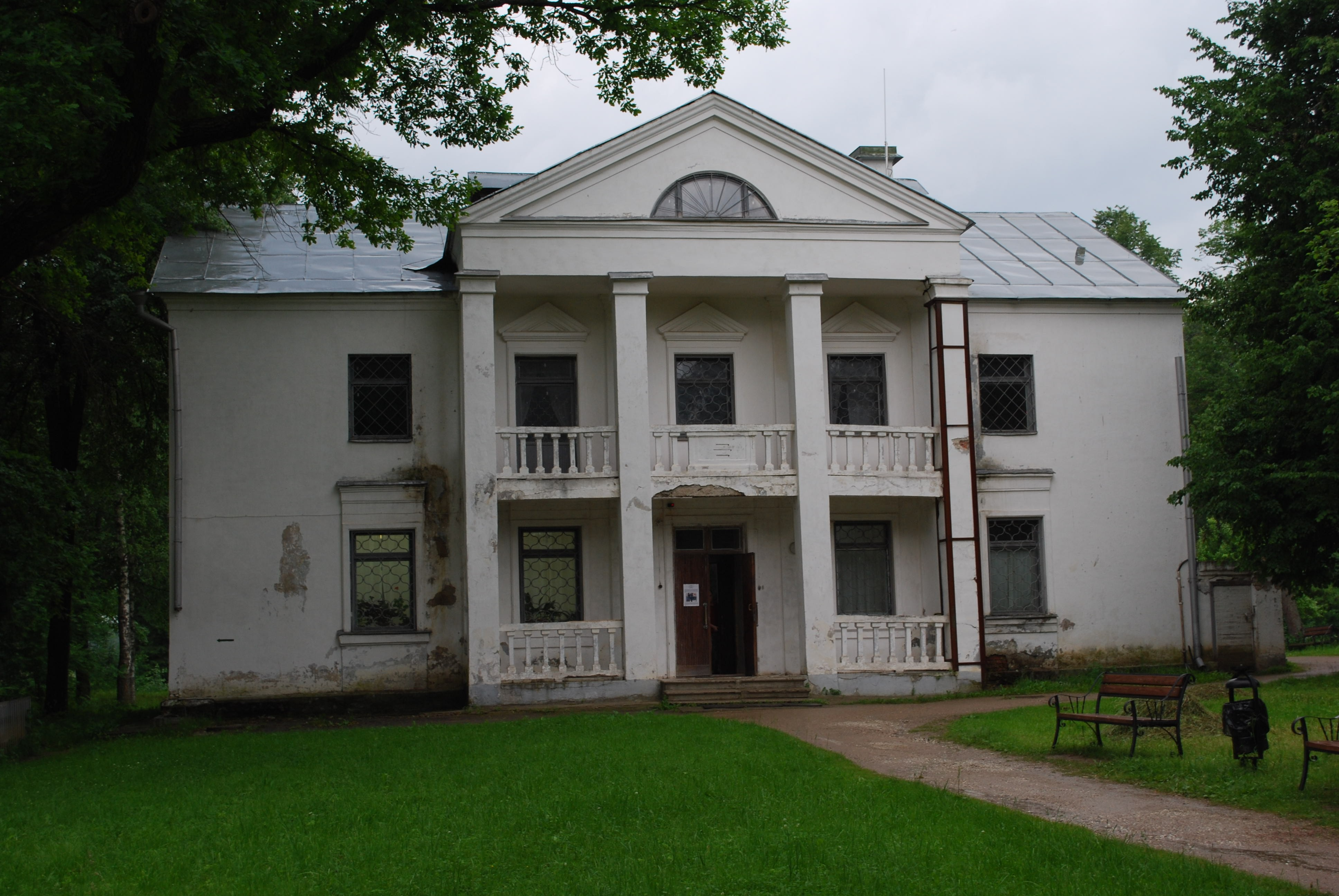
Former medical building

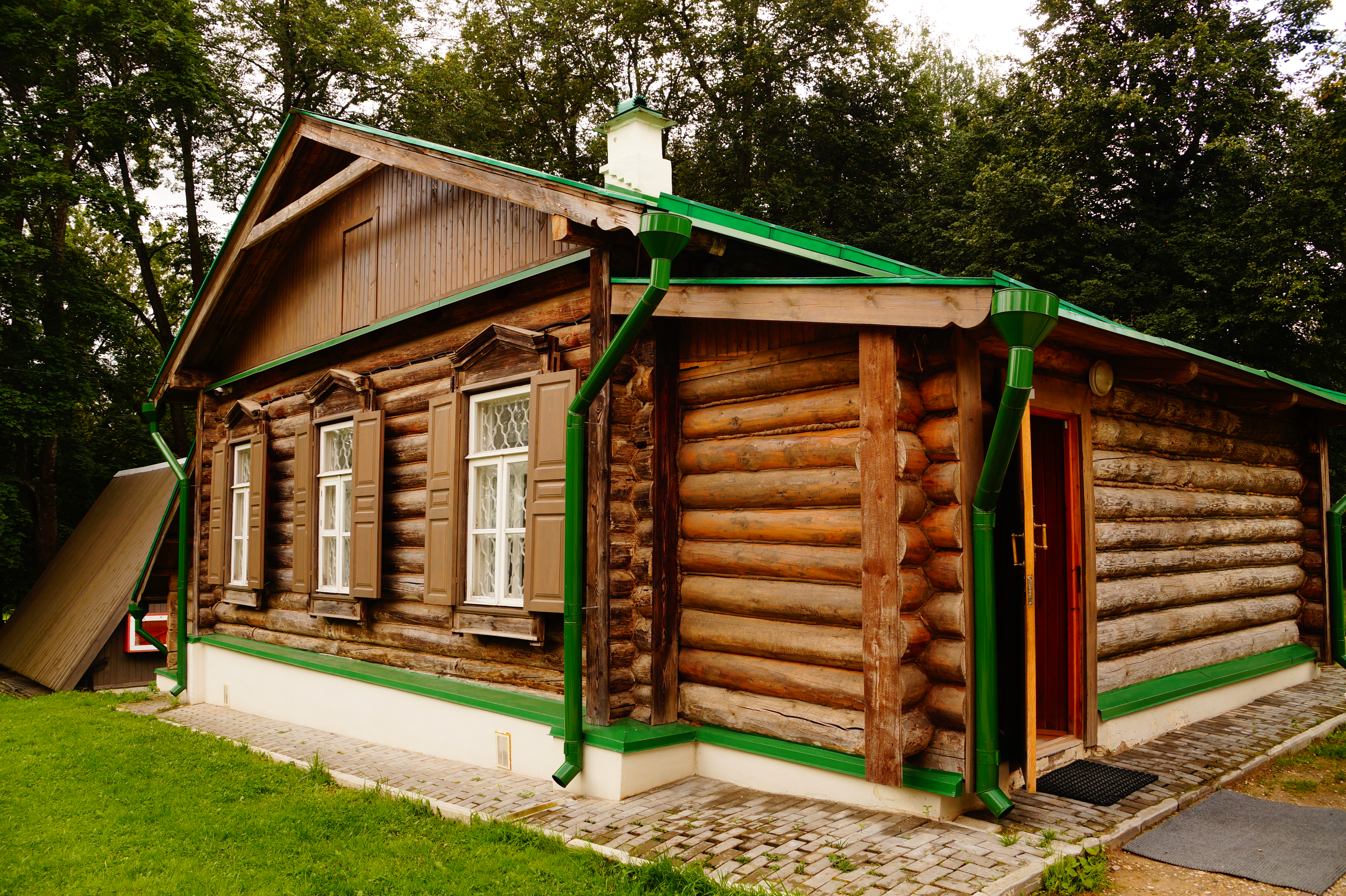
Superintendent's house

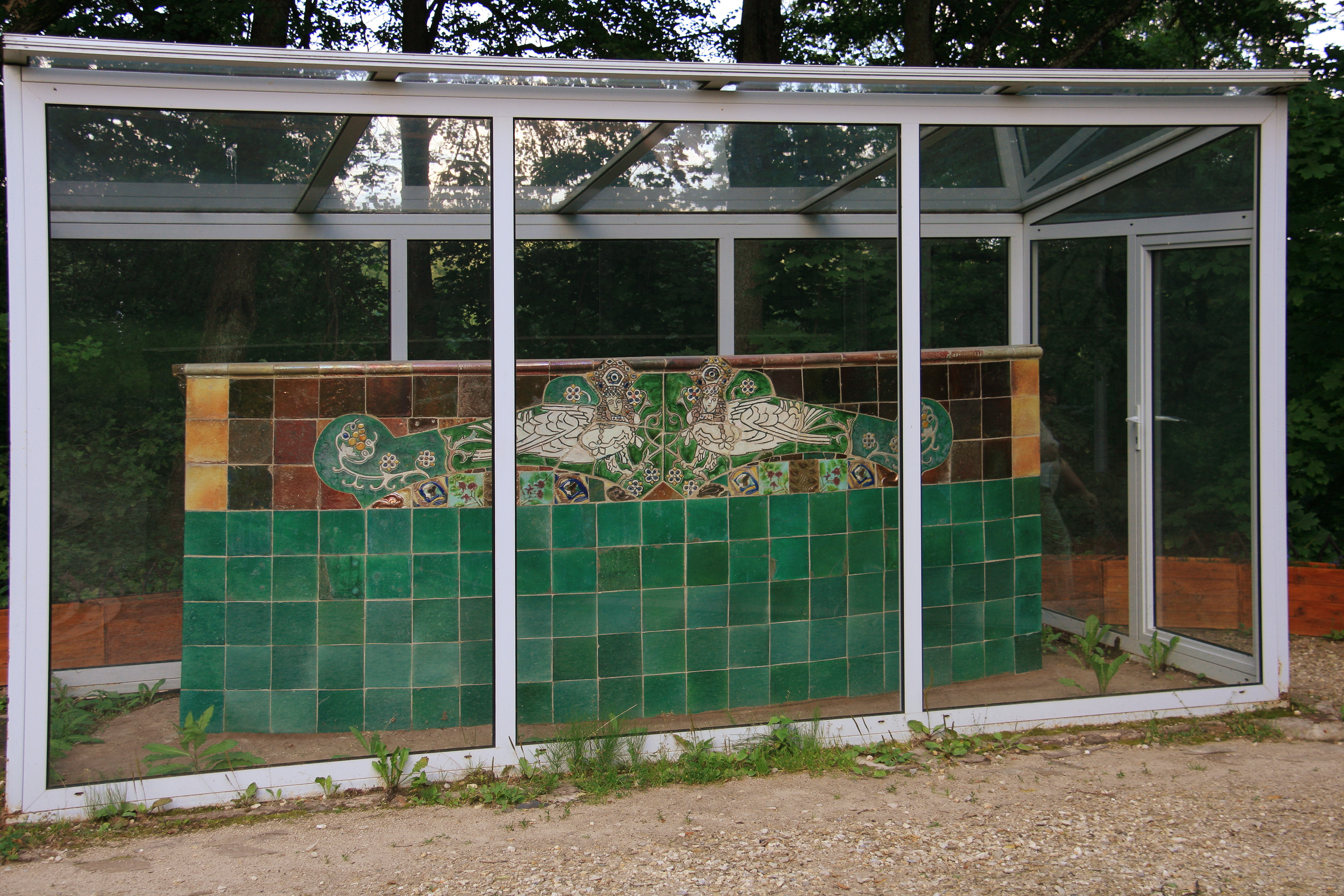
Vrubel's bench

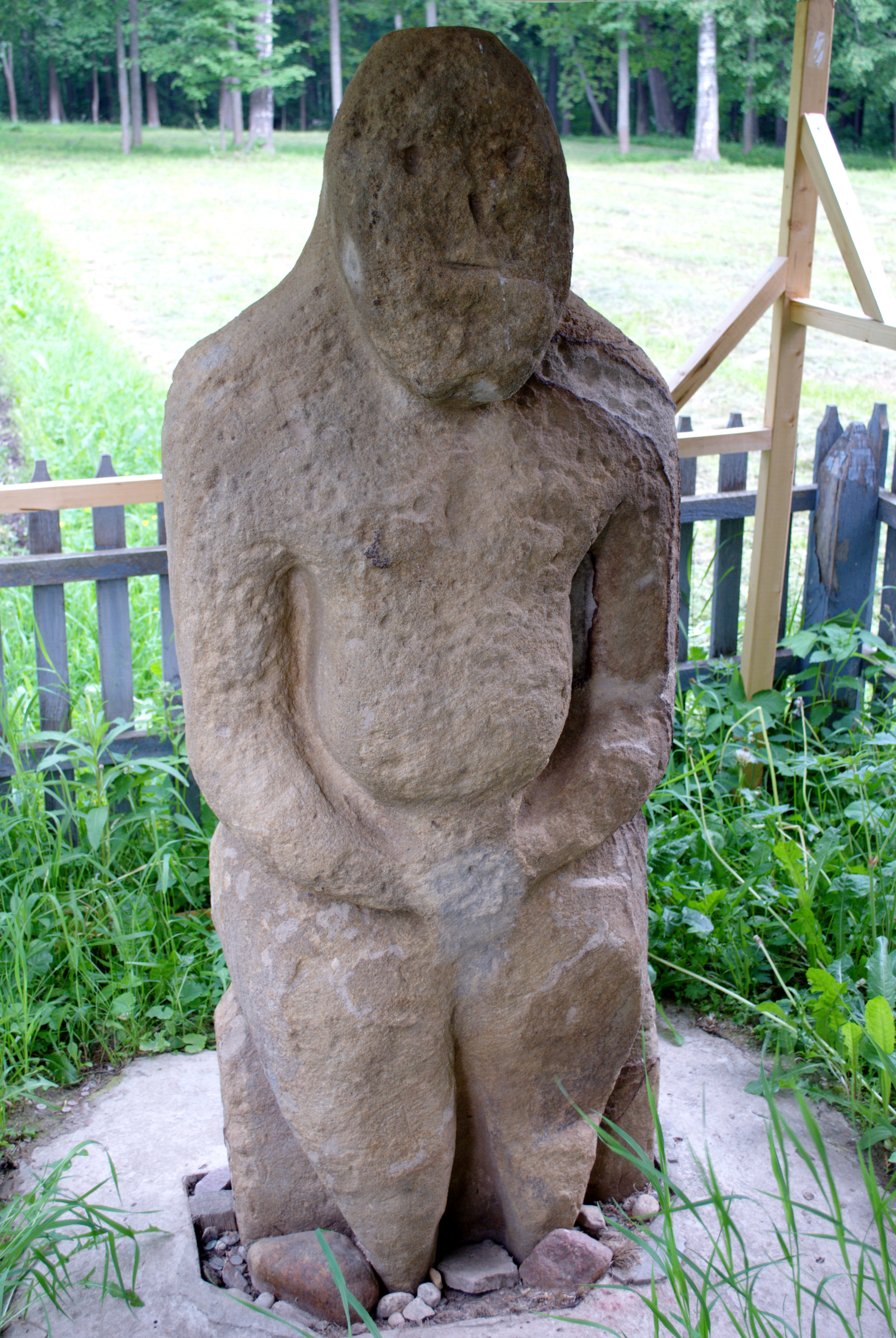
Stone woman

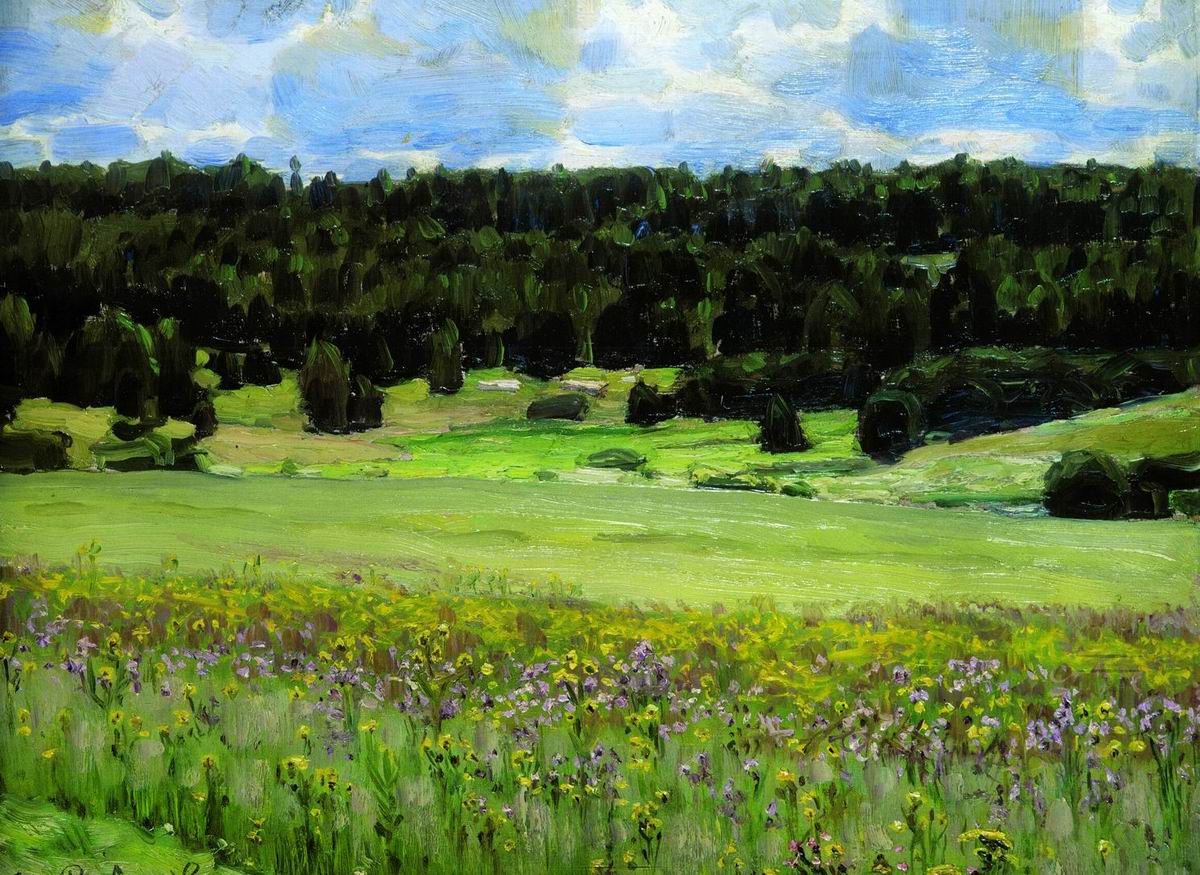
Viktor Vasnetsov, «Abramtsevo panoramas», 1880–1886

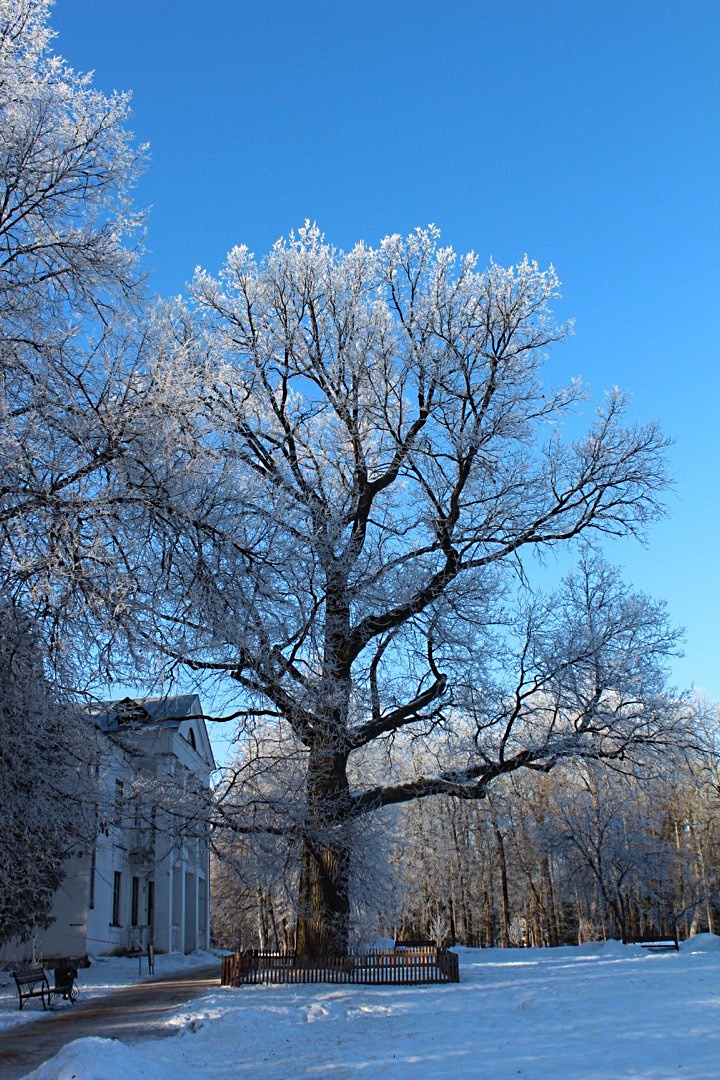
Old oak

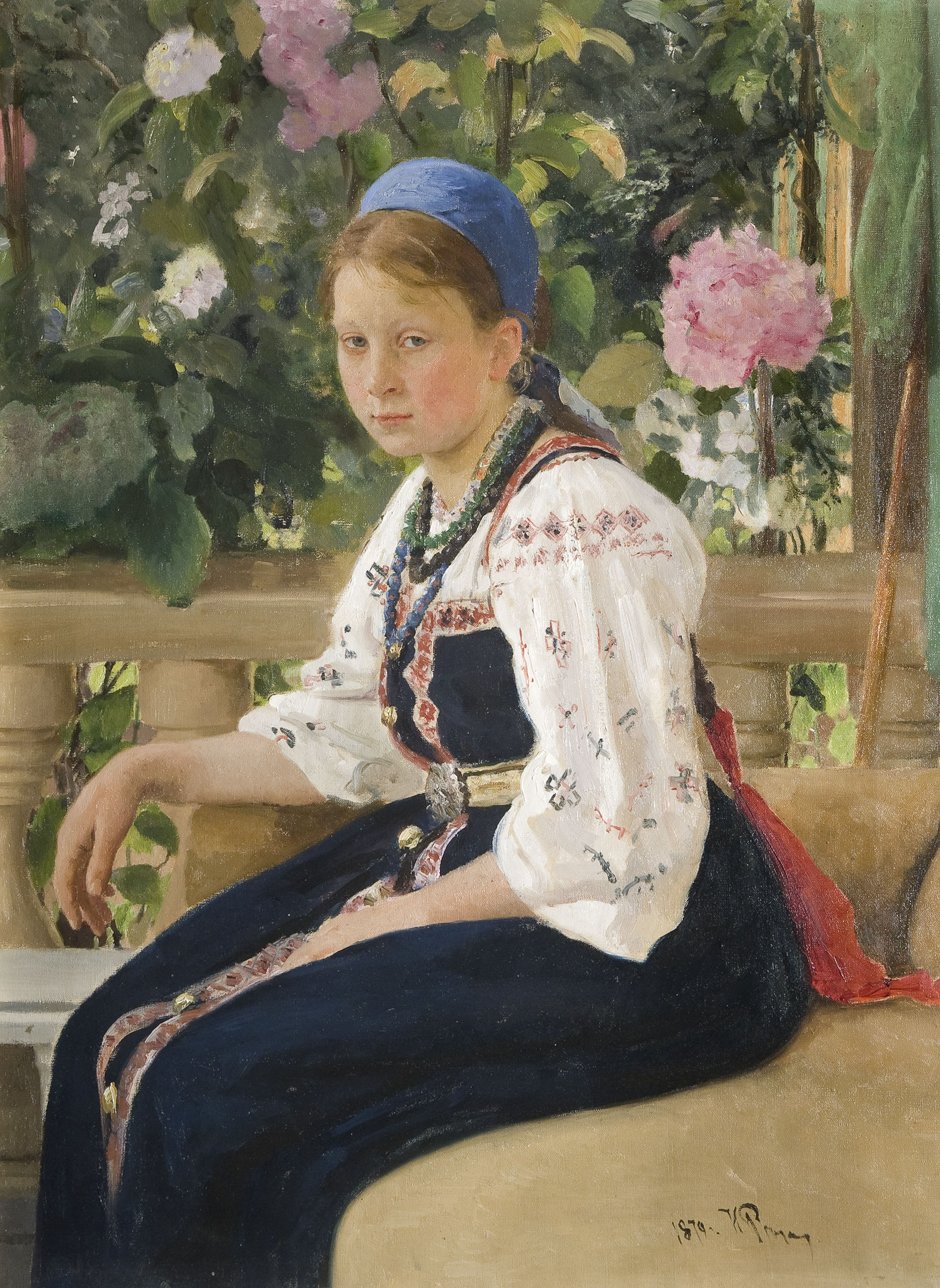
Ilya Repin, "Portrait", 1879

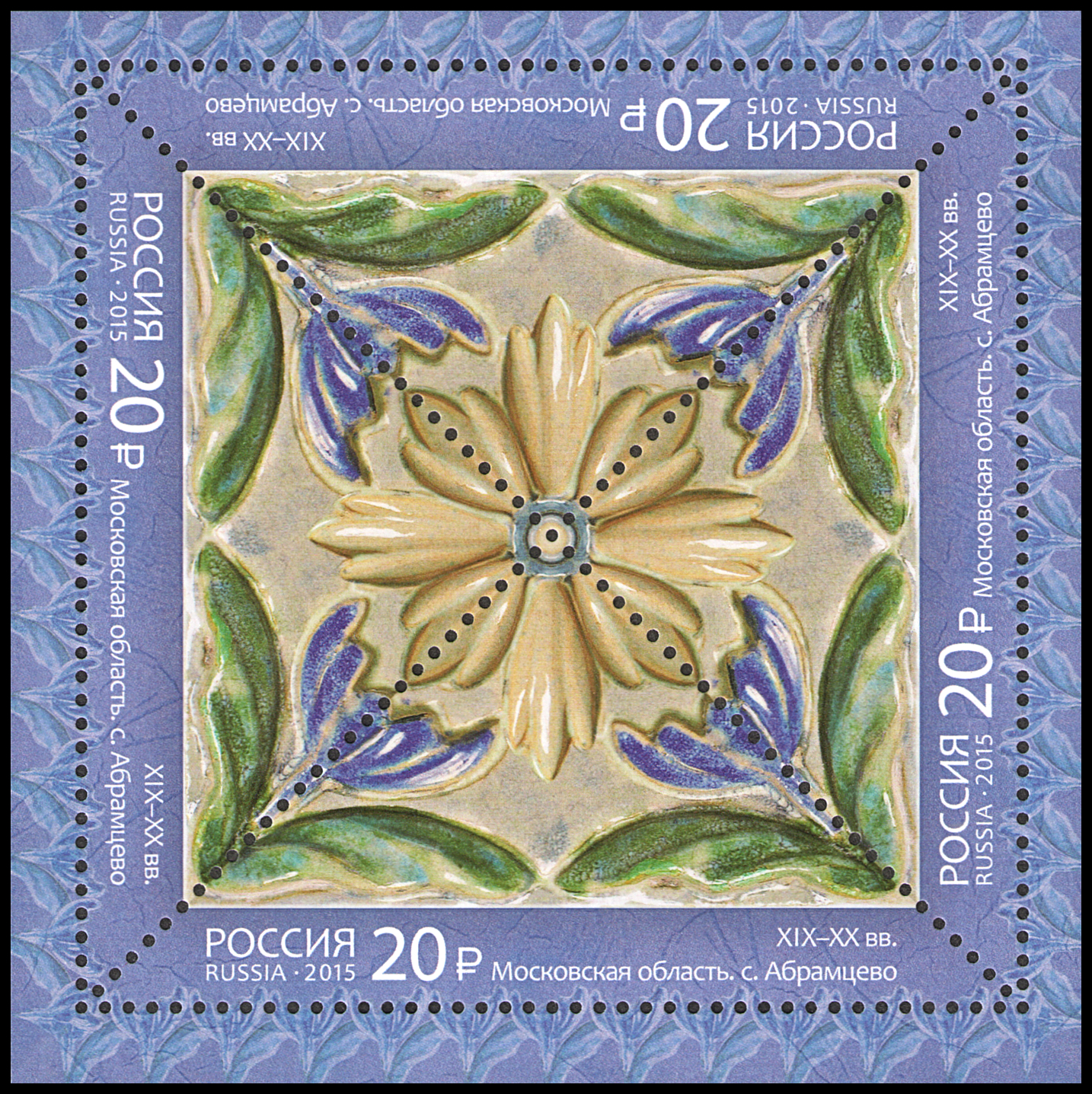
Postage stamp with tiles

== See also ==
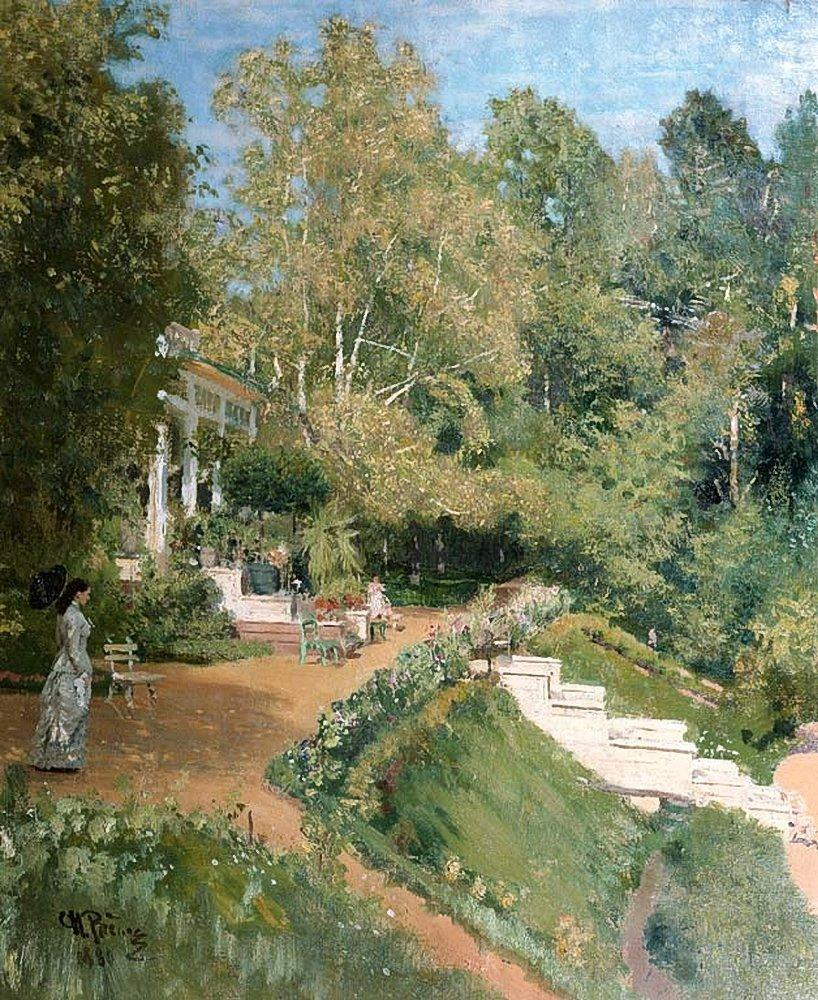
Ilya Repin: Autumn day in Abramtsevo, 1880 painting

- Aksakov Museum
