= Viktor Hartmann =

Russian architect and painter (1834–1873)

- Виктор Гартман
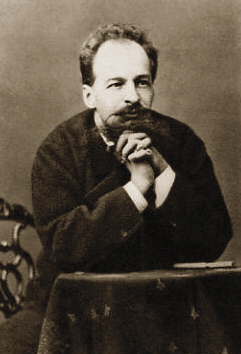
- Born: May 5, 1834; Saint Petersburg, Russia
- Died: July 23, 1873 (aged 39); Kireyevo, Moscow Governorate, Russia
- Education: Member Academy of Arts (1870)
- Alma mater: Imperial Academy of Arts (1861)
- Known for: Architecture, painting
- Awards: Big Gold Medal of the Imperial Academy of Arts (1861)

Viktor Aleksandrovich Hartmann or Gartman (Russian: Ви́ктор Алекса́ндрович Га́ртман; 5 May 1834 – 4 August 1873) was a Russian architect and painter. He was associated with the Abramtsevo Colony, purchased and preserved beginning in 1870 by Savva Mamontov, and the Russian Revival.

== Life ==
Victor-Edouard Hartmann was born in Saint Petersburg into a family of German ancestry. He was orphaned at a young age and grew up in the house of his mother's sister, L. Hemilian, and her husband Alexandre Hemilian, who was a well-known architect. Hartmann studied at the Academy of Fine Arts in Saint Petersburg and at first started working by illustrating books.

Hartmann also worked as an architect and sketched, among other things, the monument to the thousandth anniversary of Russia in Novgorod, which was inaugurated in 1862. He made most of his watercolors and pencil drawings on journeys abroad between 1864 and 1868. Together with Ivan Ropet, Hartmann was one of the first artists to include traditional Russian motifs in his work.

In 1869, Hartmann won a competition with his design for a new ornamental gate in Kiev as a commemoration of a failed assassination attempt of the tsar of Russia, Alexander II.

Since Vladimir Stasov had introduced Hartmann to the circle of Mily Balakirev in 1870, Hartmann had been a close friend of the composer Modest Mussorgsky. Following Hartmann's early death from an aneurysm at age 39, an exhibition of over 400 of his paintings was displayed in the Academy of Fine Arts in Saint Petersburg, in February and March 1874. This inspired Mussorgsky to compose his suite Pictures at an Exhibition. Most of the works shown at the 1874 exhibition are now lost, and though the gate from the 1869 competition was never constructed, its design is immortalized in the final movement of Mussorgsky's tribute.

== Gallery ==
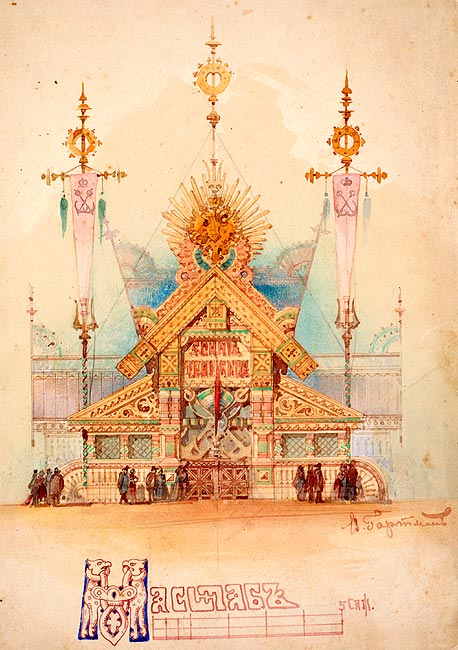
Design for the Naval department of Russia's pavilion at the Vienna World Fair of 1873

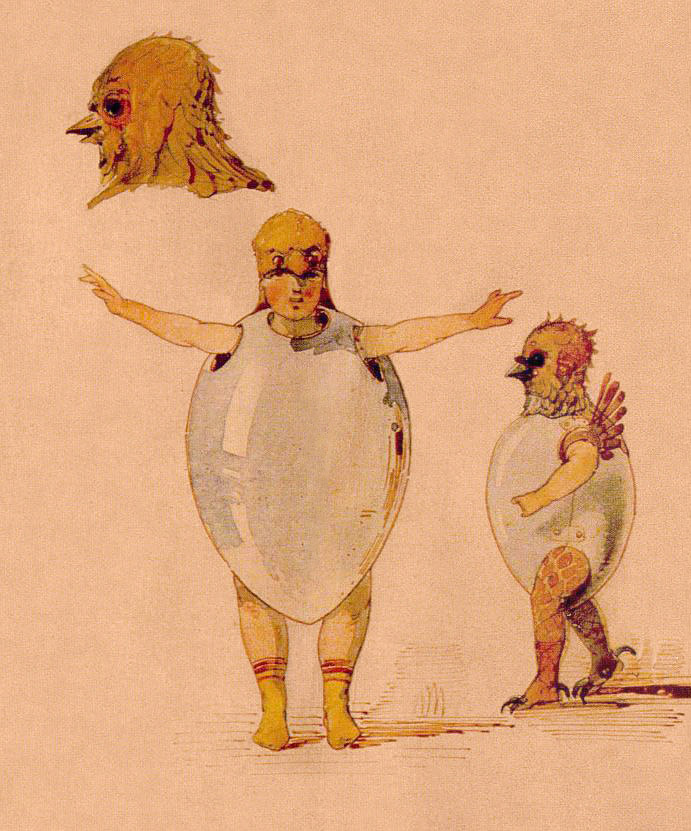
Sketch for the ballet Trilby

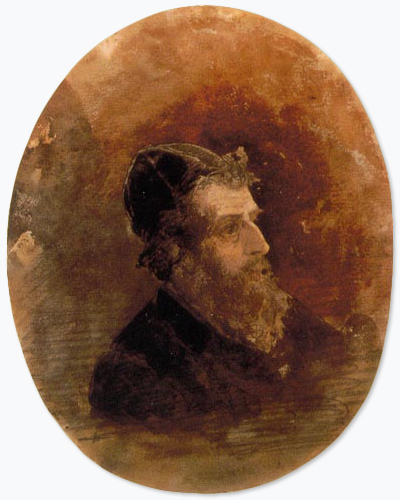
The Rich Jew

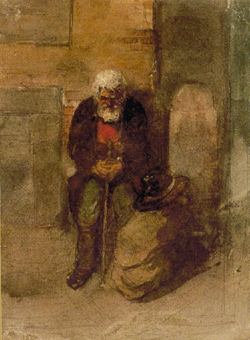
The Poor Jew

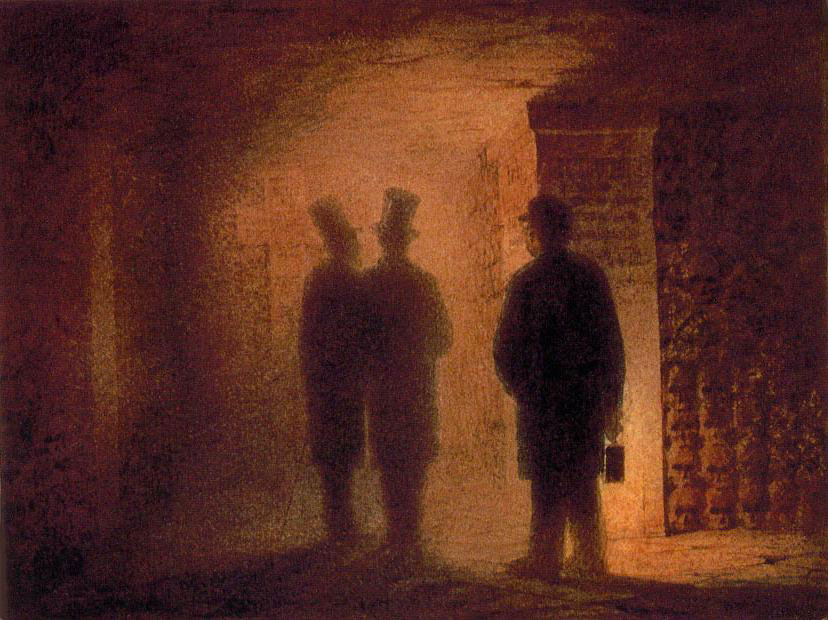
The Paris Catacombs

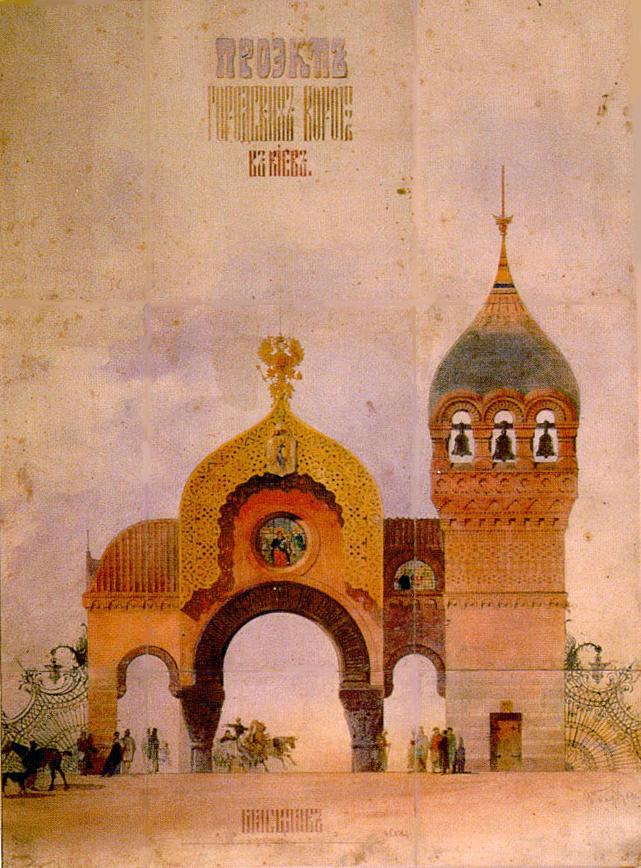
Plan for a City Gate in Kiev

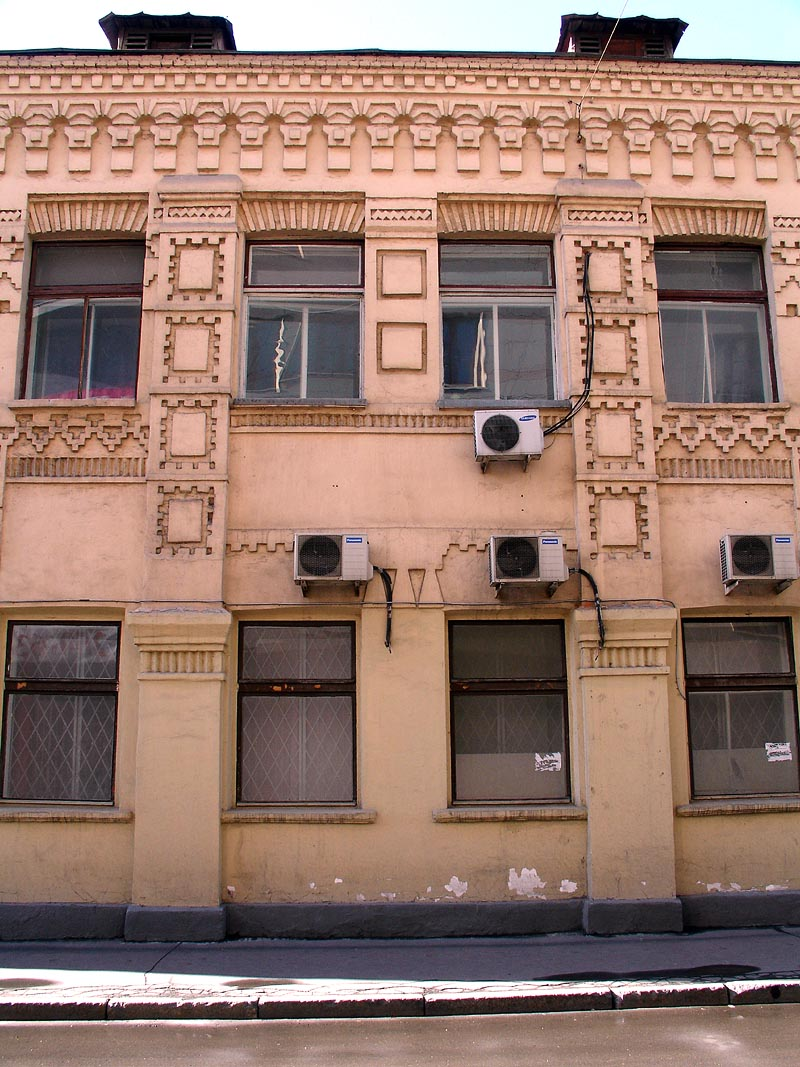
Extant Savva Mamontov printshop, Leontyevsky Lane, Moscow

== See also ==
- List of Russian artists
- List of Russian architects

== Sources ==
- "Гартман, Виктор Александрович" . Brockhaus and Efron Encyclopedic Dictionary (in Russian). 1906.
