= Aksakovo, Yermekeyevsky District, Republic of Bashkortostan =

Aksakovo Аксаково
- Village
- Location within Bashkortostan Location within Russia
- Coordinates: 54°17′N 53°32′E
- Country: Russia
- Region: Bashkortostan
- District: Yermekeyevsky District
- Time zone: UTC+5:00

Aksakovo (Russian: Аксаково) is a rural locality (a village) in Usman-Tashlinsky Selsoviet, Yermekeyevsky District, Bashkortostan, Russia. The population was 22 as of 2010. There is 1 street.

== Geography ==
Aksakovo is located 29 km north of Yermekeyevo (the district's administrative centre) by road. Usman-Tashly is the nearest rural locality.
