= Karabanovo =

Karabanovo (Russian: Карабаново) is the name of several inhabited localities in Russia.

Urban localities

- Karabanovo, Vladimir Oblast, a town in Alexandrovsky District of Vladimir Oblast

Rural localities

- Karabanovo, Belgorod Oblast, a selo in Novopetrovsky Rural Okrug of Valuysky District in Belgorod Oblast
- Karabanovo, Chelyabinsk Oblast, a settlement in Karsinsky Selsoviet of Troitsky District in Chelyabinsk Oblast
- Karabanovo, Ivanovo Oblast, a village in Vichugsky District of Ivanovo Oblast
- Karabanovo, Kostroma Oblast, a village in Chapayevskoye Settlement of Krasnoselsky District in Kostroma Oblast
- Karabanovo, Moscow Oblast, a village in Mamontovskoye Rural Settlement of Noginsky District in Moscow Oblast
- Karabanovo, Pskov Oblast, a village in Nevelsky District of Pskov Oblast
- Karabanovo, Tver Oblast, a village in Pogorelskoye Rural Settlement of Zubtsovsky District in Tver Oblast
