= Aksakovo, Karmaskalinsky District, Republic of Bashkortostan =

Aksakovo Аксаково
- Village
- Location within Bashkortostan Location within Russia
- Coordinates: 54°19′N 56°12′E
- Country: Russia
- Region: Bashkortostan
- District: Karmaskalinsky District
- Time zone: UTC+5:00

Aksakovo (Russian: Аксаково) is a rural locality (a village) in Karmaskalinsky Selsoviet, Karmaskalinsky District, Bashkortostan, Russia. The population was 28 as of 2010. There are 5 streets.

== Geography ==
Aksakovo is located 9 km southeast of Karmaskaly (the district's administrative centre) by road. Novotroitsk is the nearest rural locality.
