= Aksakovo, Vladimir Oblast =

Aksakovo Аксаково
- Village
- Location within Vladimir Oblast Location within Russia
- Coordinates: 56°04′N 42°29′E
- Country: Russia
- Region: Vladimir Oblast
- District: Gorokhovetsky District
- Time zone: UTC+3:00

Aksakovo (Russian: Аксаково) is a rural locality (a village) in Denisovskoye Rural Settlement, Gorokhovetsky District, Vladimir Oblast, Russia. The population was 5 as of 2010.

== Geography ==
Aksakovo is located on the Kurzha River, 25 km (16 mi) southwest of Gorokhovets (the district's administrative centre) by road. Yeskino is the nearest rural locality.
