= Aksakov Museum =

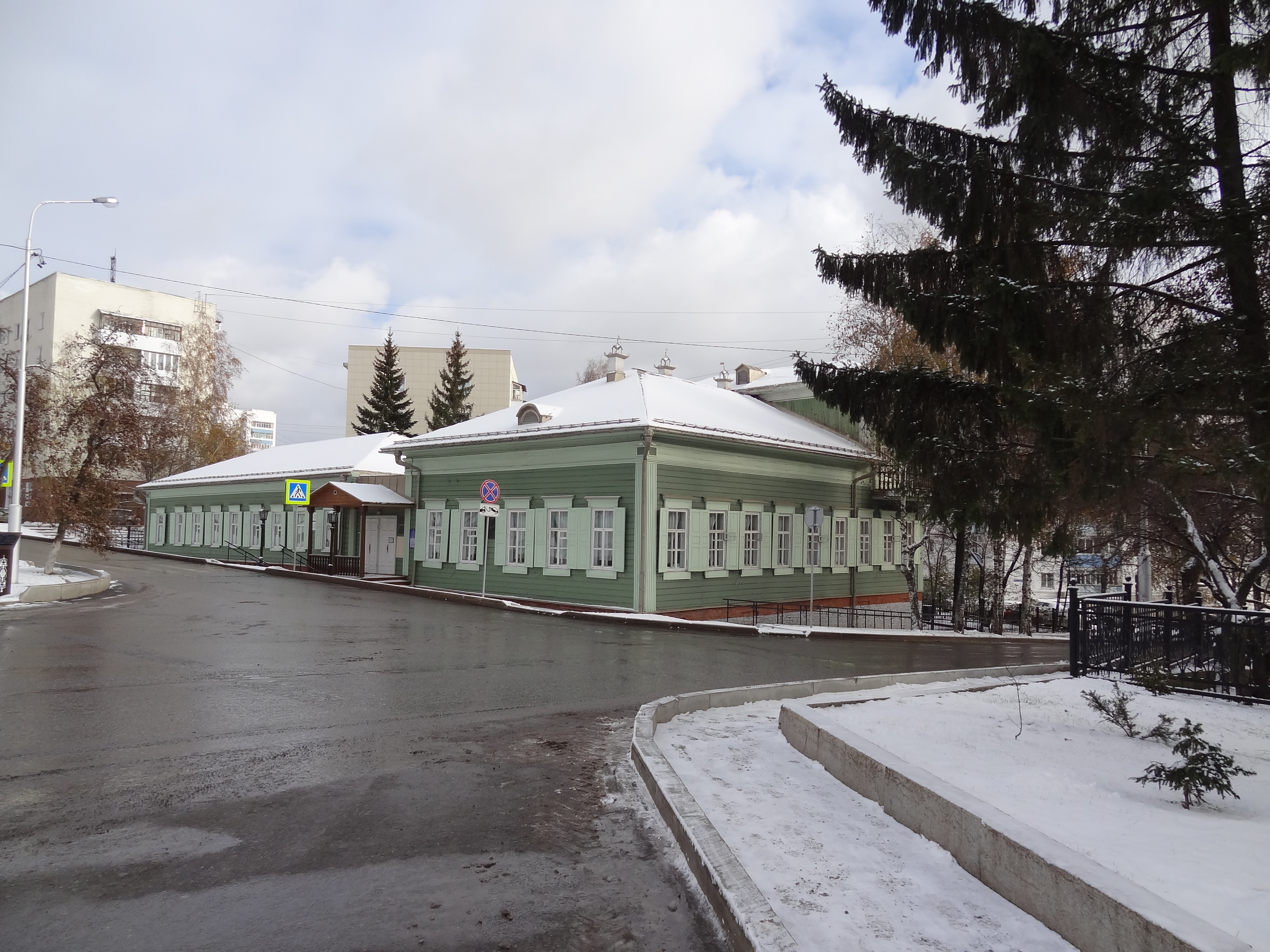
- Established: 1978; 48 years ago
- Location: Zaynulla Rasulev street, 4, Ufa, Bashkortostan, Russia
- Type: Biographical museum
- Website: http://aksakovufa.ru/

The Memorial Aksakov Museum in Ufa is a writer's house biographical museum which commemorates the life and work of author Sergey Aksakov in an apartment where he lived in Ufa, Bashkortostan, Russia. It is located about two blocks from Republic House.

== History ==
Memorial Aksakov Museum was opened in Ufa in 1991 in honour of the 200th anniversary of the writer Sergei Timofeevich Aksakov.

The wooden building was built in the first half of the XVIII century. It housed the office of the Ufa viceroyalty. The family of Nikolai Semyonovich Zubov (the writer's maternal grandfather) also lived here. After Zubov's death, the writer's father, Timofey Stepanovich Aksakov, bought the house.

== See also ==
- Abramtsevo Colony
