= Bolshoye Aksakovo =

Bolshoye Aksakovo Большое Аксаково Оло Аксаков
- Selo
- Location within Bashkortostan Location within Russia
- Coordinates: 53°50′N 55°53′E
- Country: Russia
- Region: Bashkortostan
- District: Sterlitamaksky District

Population (2010)
  - Total: 163
- Time zone: UTC+5:00

Bolshoye Aksakovo (Russian: Большое Аксаково; Bashkir: Оло Аксаков) is a rural locality (a selo) in Podlesnensky Selsoviet, Sterlitamaksky District, Bashkortostan, Russia. The population was 163 as of 2010. There are 7 streets.

== Geography ==
Bolshoye Aksakovo is located 27 km north of Sterlitamak (the district's administrative centre) by road. Vyazovka is the nearest rural locality.
