= Vasnetsov =

Vasnetsov (Russian: Васнецов) is a surname. Notable people with the surname include:

- Apollinary Vasnetsov (1856–1933), Russian painter
- Viktor Vasnetsov (1848–1926), Russian painter
