= Aksakovo, Belebeyevsky District, Republic of Bashkortostan =

Aksakovo Аксаково
- Selo
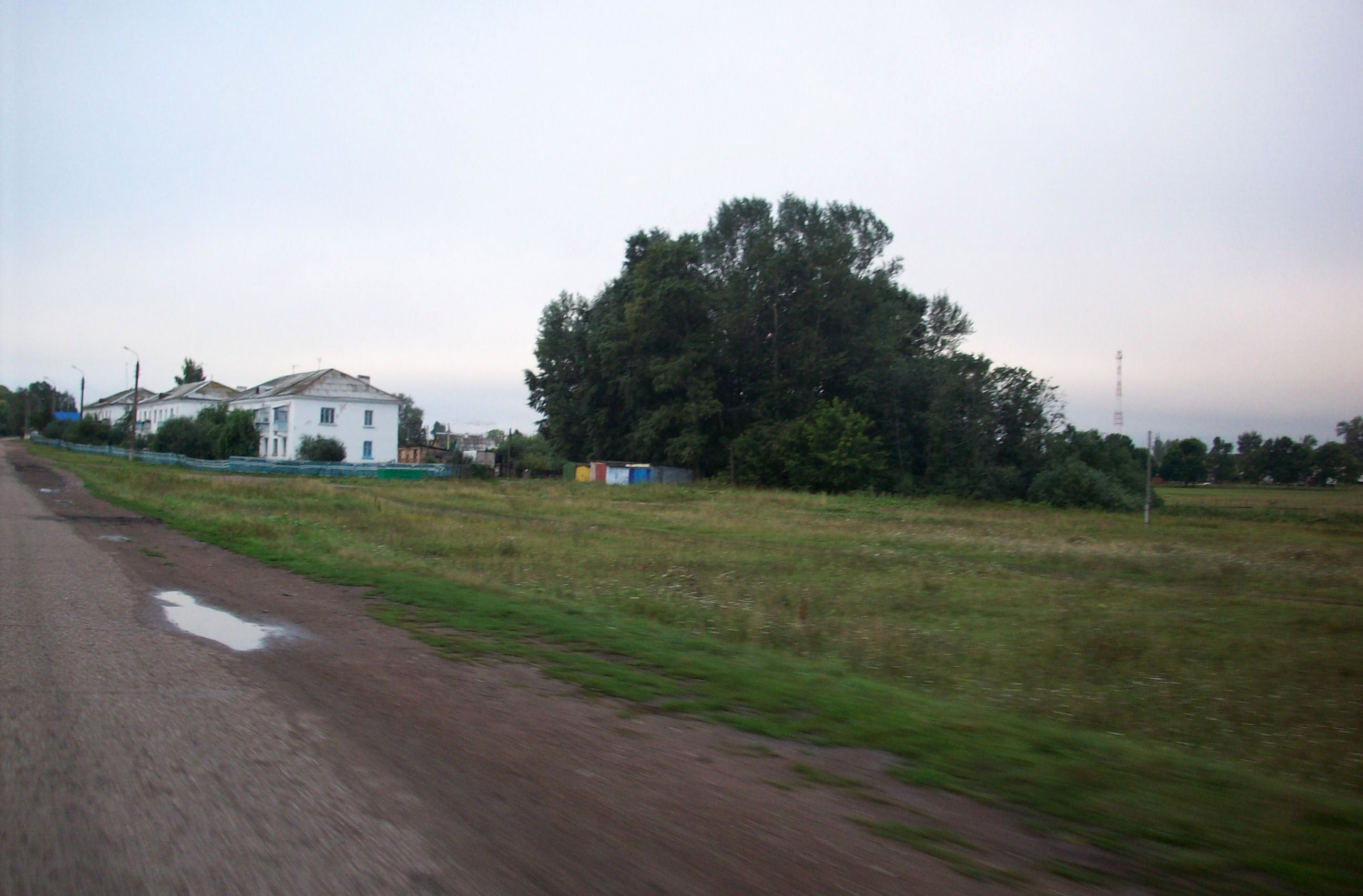

- Location within Bashkortostan Location within Russia
- Coordinates: 54°01′N 54°08′E
- Country: Russia
- Region: Bashkortostan
- District: Belebeyevsky District
- Time zone: UTC+5:00

Aksakovo (Russian: Акса́ково) is a rural locality (a selo) and the administrative centre of Aksakovsky Selsoviet, Belebeyevsky District, Bashkortostan, Russia. The population was 3,131 as of 2010. There are 39 streets.

== Geography ==
Aksakovo is located 11 km south of Belebey (the district's administrative centre) by road. Nadezhdino is the nearest rural locality.
