= Sergiyevo-Posadsky District =

Sergiyevo-Posadsky District Сергиево-Посадский район (Russian)
- District
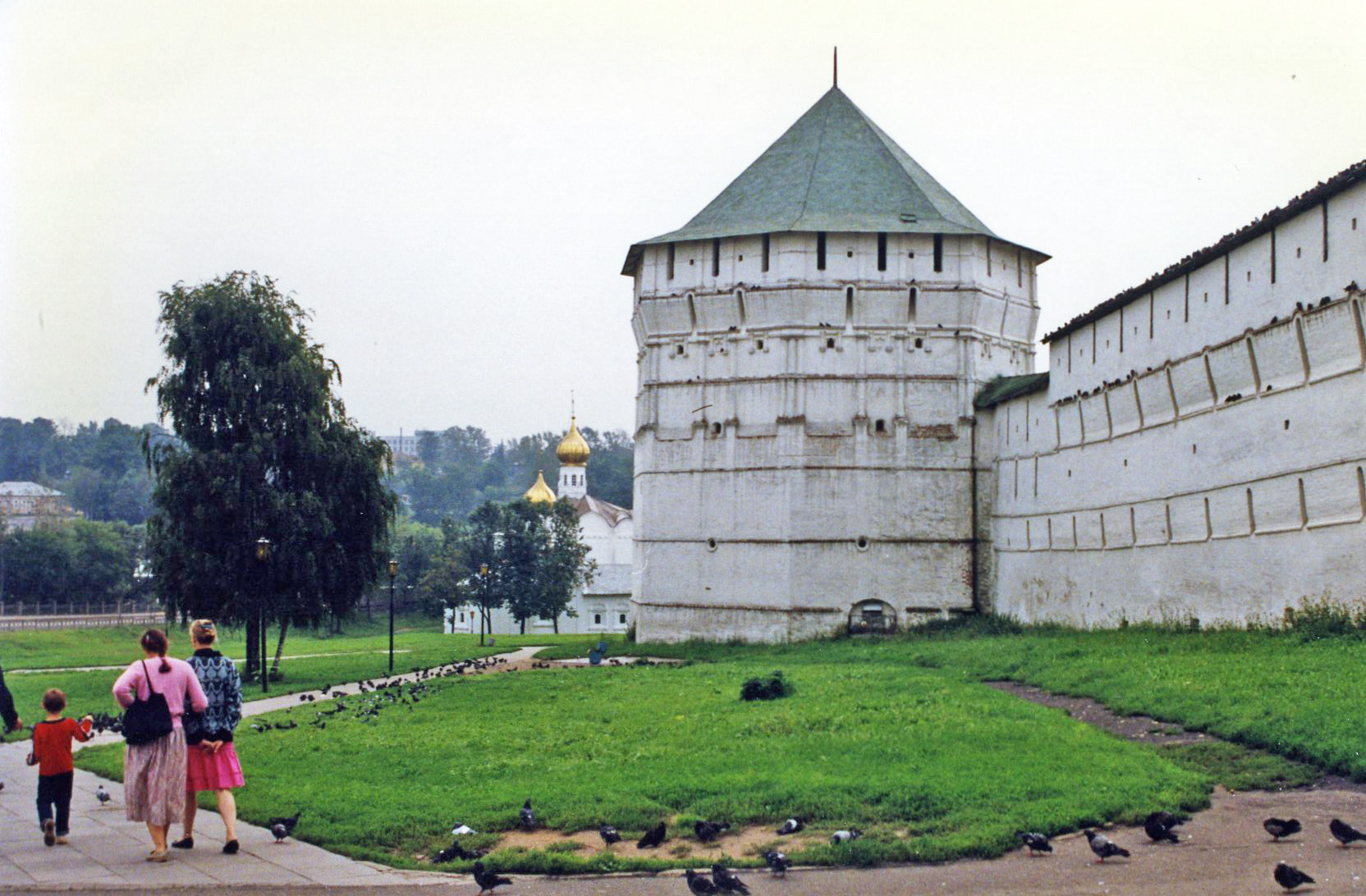
- St. Sergius Monastery, Sergieyevo-Posadsky District

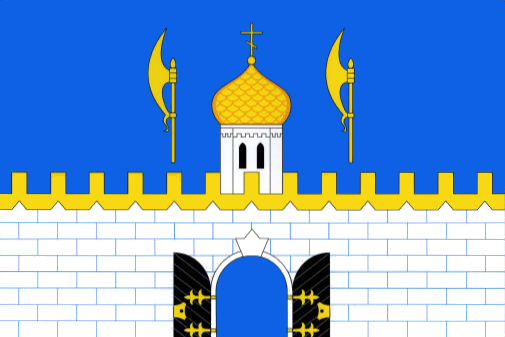
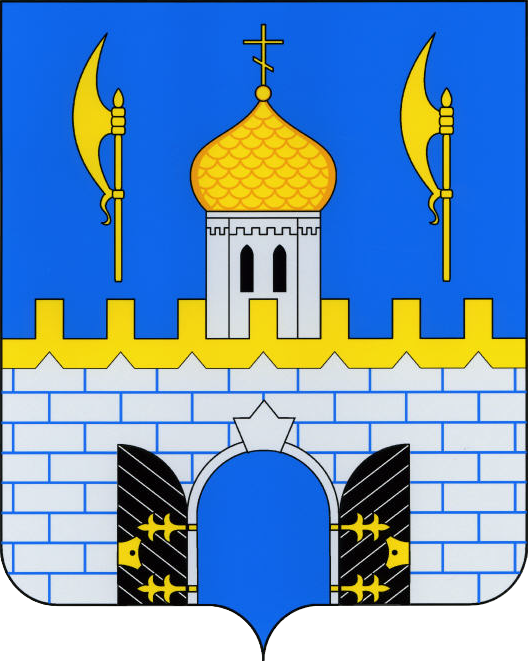
- Flag Coat of arms
- Location of Sergiyevo-Posadsky District in Moscow Oblast
- Coordinates: 56°18′N 38°08′E
- Country: Russia
- Federal subject: Moscow Oblast
- Established: 12 July 1929
- Administrative center: Sergiyev Posad

Area
  - Total: 1,997.14 km^{2} (771.10 sq mi)

Population (2010 Census)
  - Total: 225,693
  - Density: 113.008/km^{2} (292.690/sq mi)
  - Urban: 78.0%
  - Rural: 22.0%

Administrative structure
  - Administrative divisions: 4 Towns, 2 Work settlements, 6 Rural settlements
  - Inhabited localities: 4 cities/towns, 2 urban-type settlements, 289 rural localities

Municipal structure
  - Municipally incorporated as: Sergiyevo-Posadsky Municipal District
  - Municipal divisions: 6 urban settlements, 6 rural settlements
- Time zone: UTC+3 (MSK)
- OKTMO ID: 46615000
- Website: http://www.sergiev-reg.ru/

Sergiyevo-Posadsky District (Russian: Се́ргиево-Поса́дский райо́н) is an administrative and municipal district (raion), one of the thirty-six in Moscow Oblast, Russia. It is located in the north of the oblast. The area of the district is 1,997.14 square kilometers (771.10 sq mi). Its administrative center is the city of Sergiyev Posad. Population: 225,693 (2010 Census); 230,481 (2002 census); 123,404 (1989 Soviet census). The population of Sergiyev Posad accounts for 49.3% of the district's total population.

== See also ==
- Zabolotye Lake
