= List of 19th-century Russian Slavophiles =

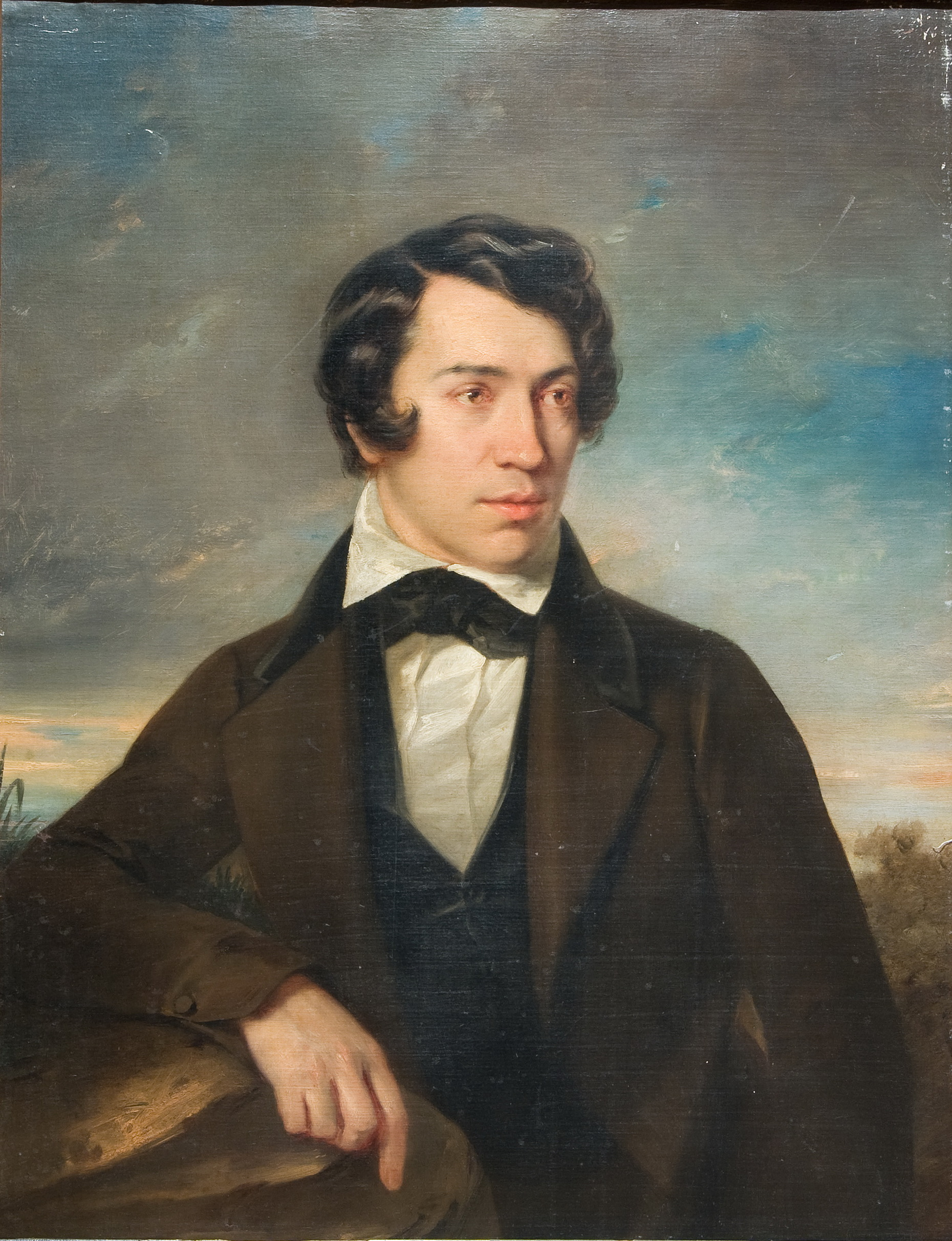
Aleksey Stepanovich Khomyakov, co-founder of the Slavophile movement

This is a list of 19th-century Russian Slavophiles:

Slavophilia is an intellectual movement originating from the 19th century that wanted the Russian Empire to be developed upon values and institutions derived from its early history. Slavophiles were especially opposed to the influences of Western Europe in Russia. There were also similar movements in Poland, Hungary and Greece.

== Prominent Slavophiles ==
- Ivan Sergeyevich Aksakov (Russian: Иван Сергеевич Аксаков; 8 October [O.S. 26 September] 1823 - 8 February [O.S. 27 January] 1886, Moscow) was a Russian littérateur and notable Slavophile. He was the son of Sergey Aksakov and brother to Vera Aksakova and Konstantin Aksakov. He was born in what is now Bashkortostan.
- Konstantin Sergeyevich Aksakov (Russian: Константин Серге́евич Аксаков) (1817–1860) was a Russian critic and writer, one of the earliest and most notable Slavophiles. He wrote plays, social criticism, and histories of the ancient Russian social order. His father Sergey Aksakov and sister Vera Aksakova were writers, and his younger brother Ivan Aksakov was a journalist.
- Aleksey Stepanovich Khomyakov (Алексей Степанович Хомяков) (May 1, 1804, Moscow – September 23/25, 1860) was a Russian religious poet who co-founded the Slavophile movement along with Ivan Kireevsky, and became one of its most distinguished theoreticians.
- Ivan Vasilyevich Kireyevsky (Russian: Ива́н Васи́льевич Кире́евский; 3 April 1806, Moscow — 23 June 1856) was a Russian literary critic and philosopher who, together with Aleksey Khomyakov, co-founded the Slavophile movement.
- Mikhail Petrovich Pogodin (Russian: Михаил Петрович Погодин, 1800, Moscow - 1875) was a Russian historian and journalist who dominated the national historiography between the death of Nikolay Karamzin in 1826 and the rise of Sergey Solovyov in the 1850s. He is best remembered as a staunch proponent of the Normanist theory of Russian statehood. In 1841 Pogodin joined his old friend Stepan Shevyrev in editing Moskovityanin, a periodical which came to voice the Slavophile opinions. In the course of the following fifteen years of editing, Pogodin and Shevyrev steadily slid towards the most reactionary form of Slavophilism.
- Yuri Samarin (Юрий Фёдорович Самарин; 1819-1876) was a leading Russian Slavophile thinker and one of the architects of the Emancipation reform of 1861.
- Fyodor Ivanovich Tyutchev (Russian: Фёдор Ива́нович Тю́тчев; 5 December [O.S. 23 November] 1803 - 27 July [O.S. 15 July] 1873) is generally considered the last of three great Romantic poets of Russia, following Alexander Pushkin and Mikhail Lermontov. Politically, he was a militant Slavophile, who never needed a particular reason to berate the Western powers, Vatican, Ottoman Empire, or Poland, perceived by him as Judas of pan-Slavic interests. The failure of the Crimean War made him look critically at the Russian government.
- Nikolay Mikhailovich Yazykov (Russian: Никола́й Миха́йлович Язы́ков, March 4, 1803, Simbirsk - December 26, 1846, Moscow) was a Russian poet and Slavophile who in the 1820s rivalled Alexander Pushkin and Yevgeny Baratynsky as the most popular poet of his generation.

== Prominent Russian nationalist and conservative thinkers influenced by Slavophile ideology ==
- Nikolay Danilevsky
- Fyodor Dostoevsky
- Ivan Ilyin
- Mikhail Katkov
- Konstantin Leontiev
- Natalia Narochnitskaya
- Konstantin Pobedonostsev
- Igor Shafarevich
- Vladimir Solovyov (philosopher)
- Sergey Solovyov
- Aleksandr Solzhenitsyn
- Nikolay Strakhov
- Lev Tikhomirov
- Sergei Trubetskoy
