= Ivan Aksakov =

Russian writer & slavophile (1823–1886)

Ivan Sergeyevich Aksakov
- Иван Сергеевич Аксаков
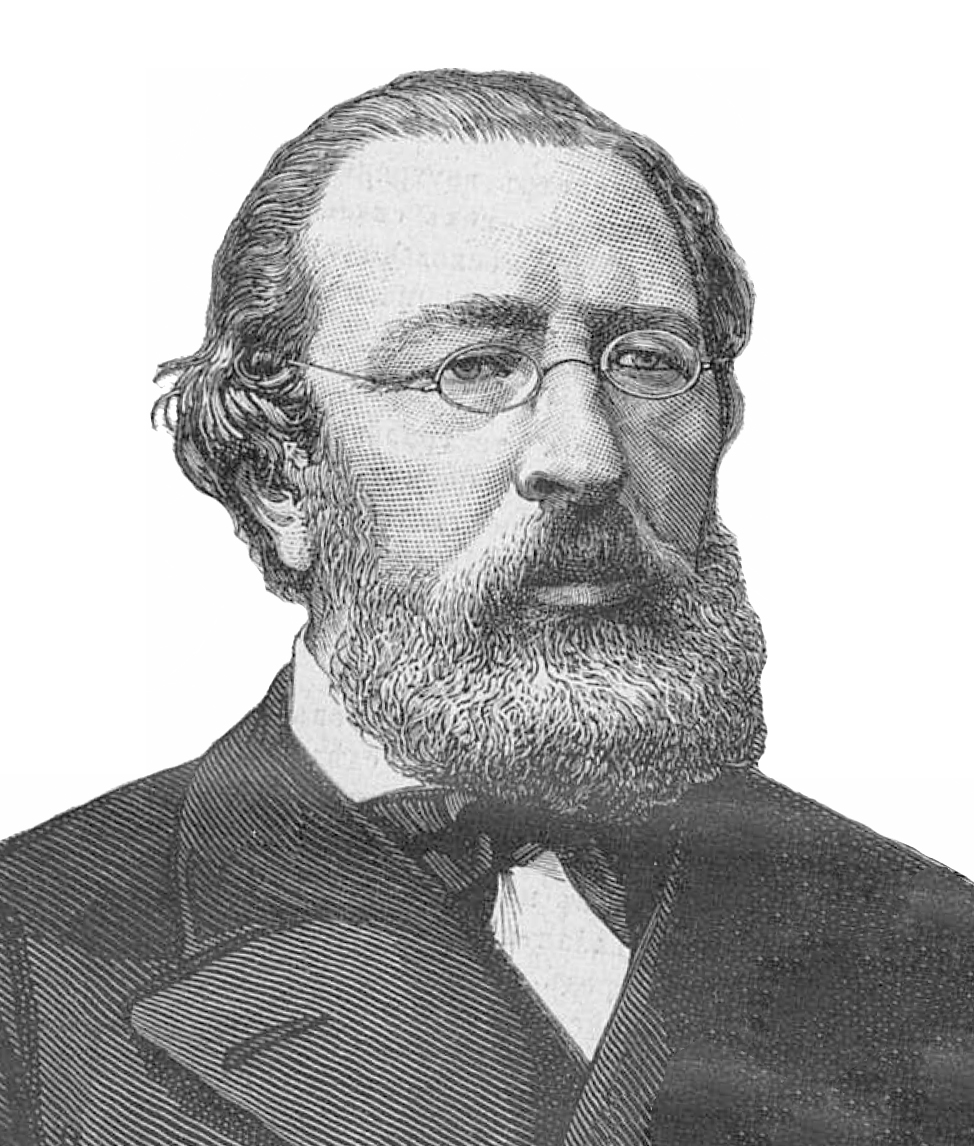
- Ivan Aksakov in 1882
- Born: October 8 [O.S. September 26] 1823 village Nadezhdino, Belebeyevsky Uyezd, Orenburg Governorate
- Died: February 8 [O.S. January 27] 1886; Moscow
- Occupations: Poet, publicist

Ivan Sergeyevich Aksakov (Russian: Ива́н Серге́евич Акса́ков; 8 October [O.S. 26 September] 1823, village Nadezhdino, Belebeyevsky Uyezd, Orenburg Governorate – 8 February [O.S. 27 January] 1886, Moscow) was a Russian littérateur and notable Slavophile.

== Biography ==
Aksakov was born in the village of Nadezhdino (then Orenburg Governorate, now Bashkiria), into a family of prominent Russian writer Sergey Timofeevich Aksakov (1791—1859) and his wife Olga Semyonovna Zaplatina (1793—1878). His mother was the daughter of Major General Semyon Grigorievich Zaplatina and a captured Turkish woman. The third son of eleven children, he was a younger brother of the writers Konstatin and Vera Aksakova.

His paternal grandfather Timofey Stepanovich Aksakov belonged to an old noble Aksakov family whose members claimed to be the decedents of Šimon. Their first documented ancestor was Ivan Feodorivich Velyaminov nicknamed Oksak who lived during the 15th century. His family crest was based on the Polish Przyjaciel coat of arms (also known as Aksak) which is considered to be of Tatar origin in Poland (the word «oksak» means «lame» in Turkic languages). All this led some researchers to believe that the Aksakov family also originated from Tatars, despite they had no relation to the Polish noble house. Aksakov's maternal grandfather was a Russian General Semyon Grigorievich Zaplatin who fought under the command of Alexander Suvorov and who married a Turkish captive Igel-Syum.

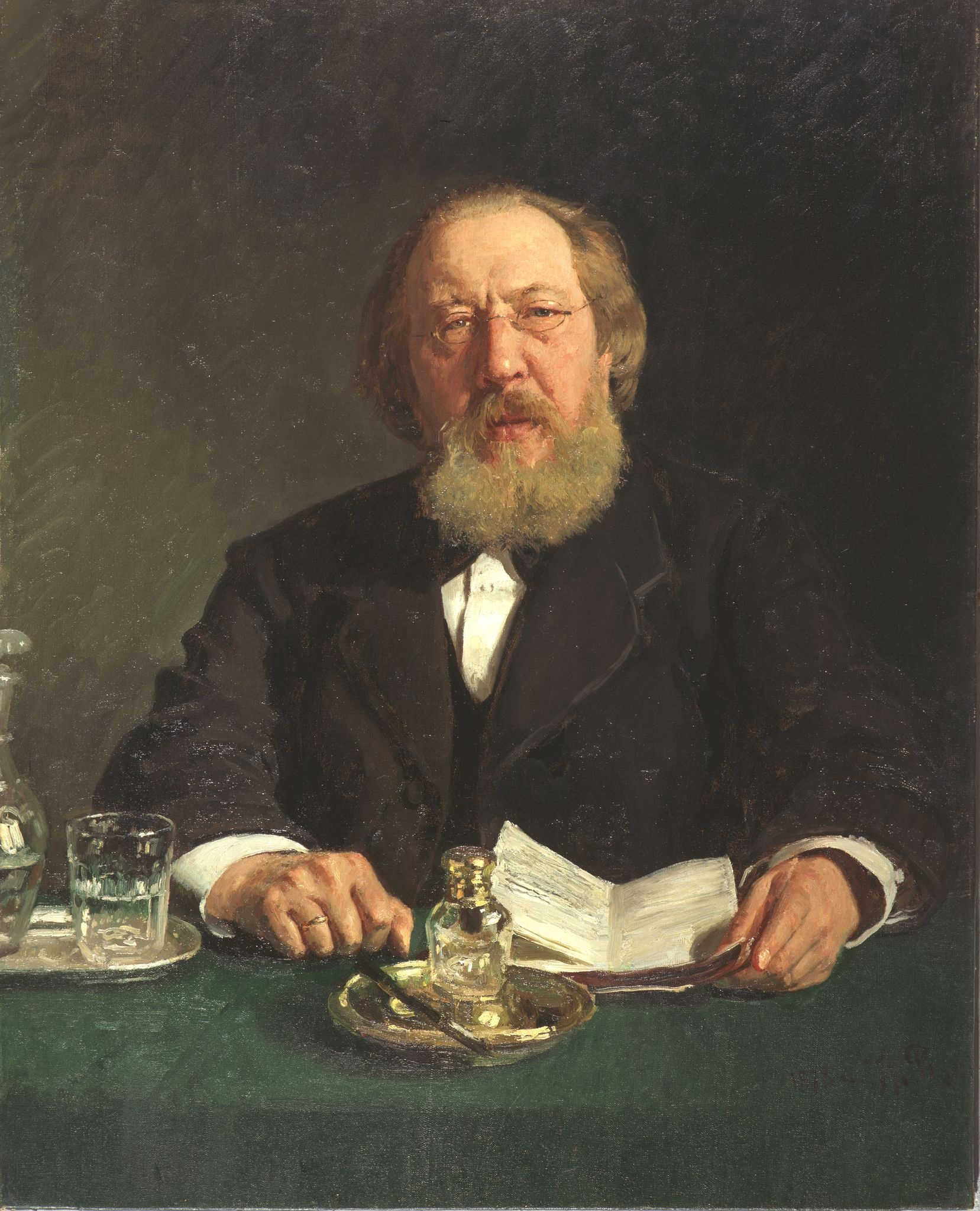
Portrait by Ilya Repin.

Aksakov spent his early years in Nadezhdino. In the autumn of 1826 he moved with his family to Moscow where he received good home education.

=== Career ===
In 1838 Aksakov enrolled in the recently opened Imperial School of Jurisprudence. Upon the graduation in 1842, he returned to Moscow and took up a post in the Russian Senate's Criminal Investigation department. After three years's assignment in Astrakhan as a member of the Audit Commission, led by Prince Pavel Gagarin and later Kaluga (as deputy chairman of the local Criminal Investigation Chamber) he returned to the Senate, as its First Department's official.

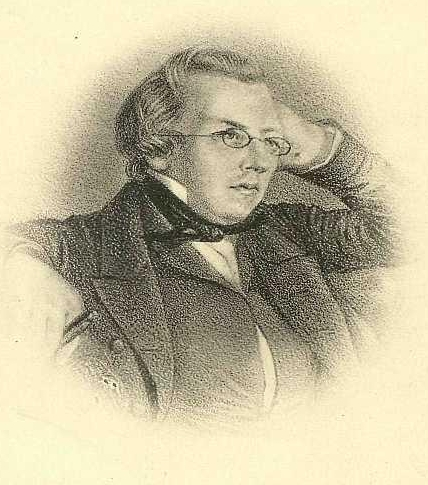
Aksakov in 1840s

During the early 1840s Aksakov wrote a lot of poetry. Mostly satirical, his early work was compiled in the summer of 1846 into what was supposed to become his first collection, it centerpiece being "The Life of a Government Official" (Жизнь чиновника. Мистерия в трех периодах, 1843; published in London in 1861, in Russia in 1886). The book was cut by the censor in such a way that Aksakov decided against publishing what's been left; his whole poetic legacy came out posthumously. Several of his poems appeared in the Moscow Literature and Science Almanac (1845) and Sovremennik (1846).

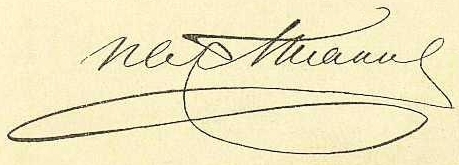
Ivan Aksakov's signature

In March 1849, upon the return from Bessarabia, where he had been sent by the Ministry of Internal Affairs to collect the data on the local religious sects, Aksakov was unexpectedly arrested, the interrogated and released five days later without any explanation. It was supposed later that the letter to his father expressing his outrage as regards the arrest of a renowned Slavophile leader Yuri Samarin might have been the cause. For several years Aksakov remained under the surveillance of the Imperial secret police.

In February 1851 Russian Interior minister Count Perovsky summoned Aksakov up to express his disgust with the latter's poem "Brodyaga" (Tramp), about a runaway peasant, which, as it later transpired, became the object of interest for the Third Department as early as 1849. Perovsky demanded that he should stop writing, Aksakov refused and retired from the state service. He moved to Moscow and joined the Slavophiles' circle and started working on the almanac called the Moscow Collection (Московский сборник). Edited by Aksakov, its first volume came out in 1852, and featured his article "Some Words on Gogol" as well as fragments from "The Tramp". A year later both the second volume and the publication itself were closed but the government, and Aksakov was banned from editing. He responded with a piece called "A Day at the Criminal Chamber. Scenes from the Court". Published in London by The Polar Star in 1858 and praised by Alexander Hertzen as "a work of genius", it appeared in print in Russia only in 1892.

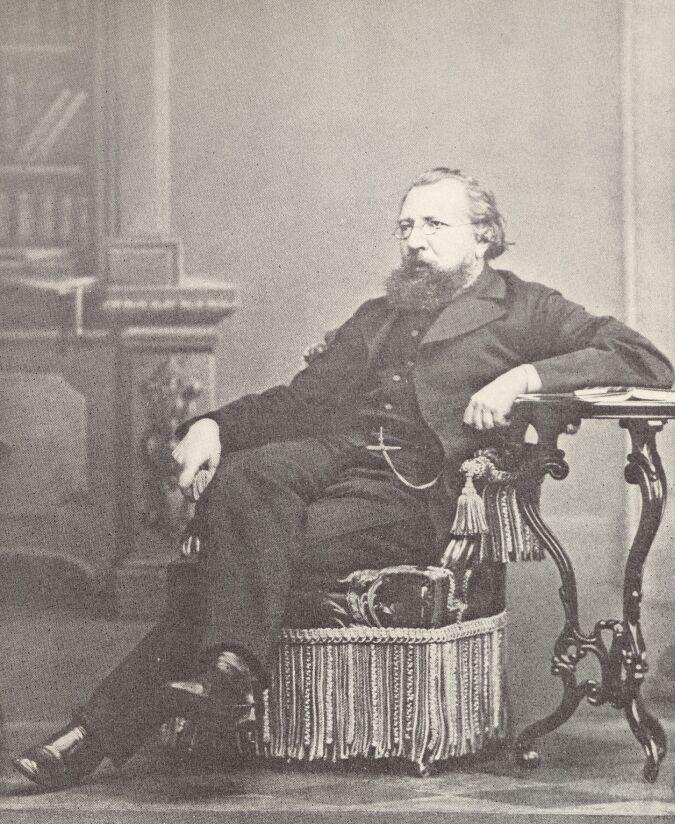
Photograph of Aksakov by Andrey Denyer

In November 1853, commissioned by the Russian Geographical Society, Aksakov travelled to Malorossia, where he spent the next year. His vast essay "The Research on Trade at the Ukrainian Fairs" (Исследование о торговле на украинских ярмарках, 1859) came as a result. It was published by the Geographical Society in 1859, and earned its author the Konstantine Medal and half of that year's Demidov Prize.

As the Crimea War broke out, Aksakov joined the Serpukhov Druzhina of the Moscow Militia in February 1855 and traveled to Bessarabia. After the war he stayed in the Crimea as a member of the government commission investigating the financial wrongdoings of the Russian intendant services.

In early 1857 Aksakov went abroad to visit Germany, France, Italy, Switzerland and secretly met Hertzen in London, with whom he started from then on to correspond. More than thirty Aksakov's articles appeared in Hertzen's publications, signed by the pseudonym Kasyanov. In September 1857 Aksakov returned to Russia. A year later he joined the editorial staff of Russkaya Beseda, to become first this magazine's co-editor and soon, de facto, its editor-in-chief. He co-founded the Slavic Charitable Committee and became one of its most active leaders.

In 1859 he received the permission to found the newspaper Parus (Парус, Sail). It was closed by the authorities after just two issues. With his close associate, scientist and industrialist Fyodor Chizhov, Aksakov applied for the permission to edit another newspaper, Parokhod (Пароход, Steamboat), so as to fulfill the obligations before the subscribers. The permission was given, on condition that "there'd be no rising the issue in it of the right for the peoples [of the Empire], Slavic or otherwise, to develop their own national identity." Since to rise that issue had been exactly Aksakov's intention, the project was dropped.

Aksakov spent 1860 traveling all over the Eastern Europe where he met several prominent writers and politicians of the West Slavic countries. Upon the return he became the editor-in-chief of the newspaper Den (1861-1865).

On 12 January 1866 Aksakov married Anna Tyutcheva, a Russian courtier, and (from 1853 until 1866) the maid of honour and confidante of empress Maria Alexandrovna (Marie of Hesse). He spent the first year of their marriage at home, devoting himself totally to family affairs. In 1867 he started editing the newspaper Moskva (1867-1868), regularly providing editorials on a wide range of topics concerning Russia's economy and internal affairs, propagating his Slavophile views. Many of those appeared in the form of black-framed notifications, informing the readership that "this editorial is unavailable owing to circumstances beyond the control of the editorial staff." As it was later revealed, in the censorship committee's secret 1865 review of the Russian press Aksakov was mentioned among those whose activities demanded special attention and was characterized as "a democrat with Socialist inclinations."

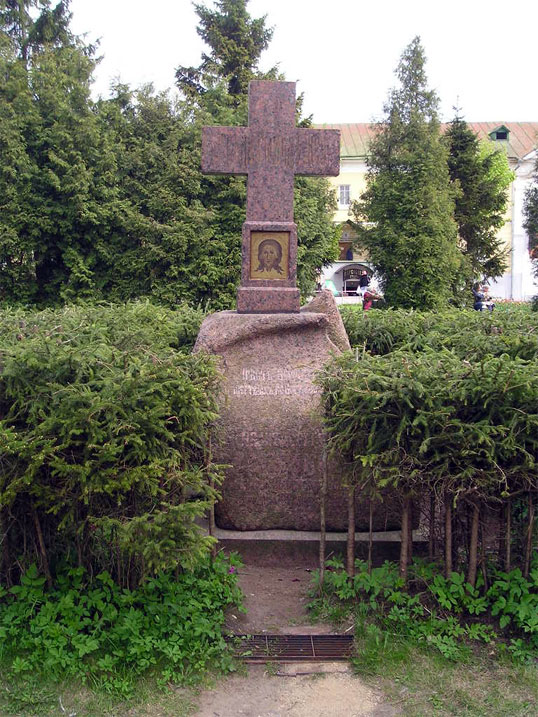
Aksakov's gravestone in the Troitse-Sergiyeva Lavra.

Warnings and suspensions (some up to six months) forced Aksakov to stop the publication of Den. Moskva was closed by the authorities. His "Biography of Fyodor Ivanovich Tyutchev" (1874) infuriated censors to such an extent that the book's second edition's whole print run was captured and destroyed, due to its "generally reprehensible nature," according to the official explanation.

As a chairman of the Slavic Charitable Society, Aksakov concentrated mostly on the efforts aimed at providing financial help for Serbia and Montenegro during the Montenegrin–Ottoman War (1876–78) and transporting the units of Russian volunteers' into the Balkans. As the 1877–1878 Russo-Turkish War broke out, he continued to promote the ideas of Pan-Slavism in the Russian press, then switched the focus of his attention to organizing the financial and military aid for Bulgaria. On 22 July 1878, speaking at the Moscow Slavic Society, Aksakov came out with a speech attacking both the decisions of the Congress of Berlin and the position of the Russian delegation which, as he saw it, failed to confront the "political conspiracy" aimed against Russia which had "won the war but was relegated to the status of a losing party."

This demarche had serious political resonance and dire consequences for Aksakov. He was ordered to leave Moscow and had to spend the rest of the year in exile, residing in the village of Varvaryino, Vladimir Governorate. The Slavic Charitable Society was shut down. In December 1878 Aksakov received the permission to return to Moscow.

The tsar, Alexander III of Russia, attempted to call a constitutional assembly in 1881, saying "At last, I have the mountain off my shoulders. I have asked my ministers to draft the scheme of an Assembly of Representatives." This Aksakov highly opposed, and he suggested to the tsar that instead he should offer tax breaks for the peasantry, and with the assurance of other Russian courtiers, such as the conservative Konstantin Pobedonostsev and Mikhail Katkov, the tsar withdrew his proposal for a constitution and went with light tax breaks.

After two quiet years, in 1880, with the support from Count Mikhail Loris-Melikov, he managed to found another Slavophile newspaper, a weekly called Rus which lasted six years, until his death on 8 February 1886, of heart failure.

Ivan Sergeyevich Aksakov is interred in the Trinity Lavra of St. Sergius cemetery, in Sergiyev Posad. The Collected Works by I.S. Aksakov in 7 volumes were published in 1880-1887. The four-volume edition of Aksakov's vast correspondence came out in 1896.

== Legacy ==
Aksakov saw the peasant commune as a 'moral choir' and the basis for a spiritually regenerated Russian state, believing that 'the wing of the Russian eagle' would be the guiding force in uniting 'the whole Slavonic world' and defeating the threat of the Austrian Empire. D.S. Mirsky considered him the finest Russian journalist, after Alexander Herzen. The historian Andrzej Walicki has identified Aksakov as the intellectual bridge between Slavophilism and Panslavism.

== Honour ==
Aksakovo town in Northeastern Bulgaria and Aksakov Street in Sofia, Bulgaria are named after Ivan Aksakov.

== See also ==
- List of 19th-century Russian Slavophiles
