= Ivan Kireyevsky =

Russian philosopher (1806–1856)

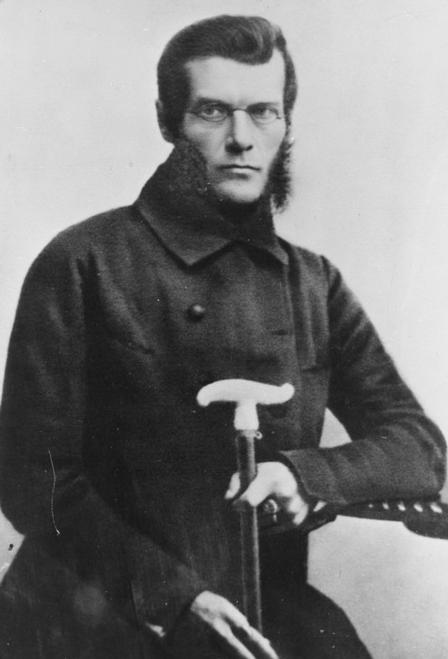
Ivan V. Kireyevsky

Ivan Vasilyevich Kireyevsky (Russian: Ива́н Васи́льевич Кире́евский; 3 April [O.S. 22 March] 1806 – 23 June [O.S. 11 June] 1856) was a Russian literary critic and philosopher who, together with Aleksey Khomyakov, is credited as a co-founder of the Slavophile movement.

== Early life and career ==
Ivan Kireyevsky and his brother Pyotr were born into a cultivated noble family of considerable means. Their father was known for hating French atheism so passionately that he would burn heaps of Voltaire's books, acquired specifically for the purpose. He contracted a fatal case of typhus while treating wounded soldiers during the French invasion of Russia. The boy was just six at the time of his death; he was brought up by a maternal uncle, Vasily Zhukovsky, and his mother, Avdotya Yelagina, who would later become an influential lady with a brilliant salon in Moscow. She professed her dislike of Peter the Great for his treatment of his wife Eudoxia and the Lopukhin family, to which she was related. The father's distaste for French culture and the mother's distrust of post-Petrine officialdom may have shaped Kireyevsky's views on Russia and its history.

Starting in 1821, Kireyevsky attended the Moscow University, where he became interested in contemporary German philosophy and joined the circle of "wisdom-lovers" (Lyubomudry), led by Dmitry Venevitinov and Vladimir Odoevsky. He was particularly impressed by the teachings of Schelling, whose representation of the world as a living organism was in tune with Kireyevsky's own intense dislike of European rationalism and fragmentedness. Kireyevsky's original literary works do not give him a place in the history of Russian literature, but he did gain a measure of fame by publishing the penetrating analyses of contemporary authors. His 1828 review of Pushkin's poetry, written in purple prose and entitled "Some Observations about the Character of Pushkin's Poetry", contained the first in-depth assessment of Eugene Onegin. Later, Kireyevsky would exchange letters with Pushkin and publish his works in his short-lived periodical "Yevropeyets" (The European).

After having been refused by his cousin, Kireyevsky set out for Europe, where he attended the lectures of Schelling, Schleiermacher, Hegel, and Michelet. During his travels, he perceived the rotten foundations of Western society, based on individualism, which he would later contrast with the integrality (sobornost) of Russian society. Back in Moscow by 1832, he "united all the literary aristocracy" (as Pogodin said) under the aegis of "Yevropeyets". The journal was banned after two issues, but not before Kireyevsky published his large article The Nineteenth Century, his first extended critique of Western philosophy and values.

The failure of "Yevropeyets" exacerbated Kireyevsky's disappointment in Russian intellectuals and elite. He married and applied himself wholeheartedly to family life. Many critics, starting with Herzen, tended to attribute the twelve-year hiatus in Kireyevsky's literary career to his Oblomovian inclination to indecision and inaction. Indeed, his whole literary output consists of a dozen full-length articles and may be collected within a single volume (The full 1911 collection of his works, including letters, is 600 pages in two volumes).

== Later life and ideas ==
It was not until the early 1840s that Kireyevsky reappeared on the intellectual scene of Moscow to take the side of Khomyakov in his controversy with Herzen, Timofey Granovsky and other young "Westernizers". Since the reactionary reign of Nicholas I was not favourable for journalistic activities, Khomyakov and Kireyevsky criticized the "one-sided, superficial, analytical rationality" of the West in salons and soirées of Moscow.

In his few written works, Kireyevsky contrasted the philosophy of Plato and Greek Church Fathers (notably Maximus the Confessor) with the rationalism of Aristotle and medieval Catholic Doctors of the Church. He blamed Aristotle "for molding the mind of the West in the iron cast of reasonableness", which he defined as timid prudence (as opposed to true wisdom) or the "striving for the better within the circle of the commonplace". Hegel's doctrines were seen as the latest emanation of Aristotle's analytical approach, which divorced mind from soul, thoughts from (religious) feelings.

Kireyevsky aspired to retrieve the lost wholeness of Man in the teachings of Eastern Orthodoxy. His devout wife introduced him to the elders (startsy) of the Optina Monastery, which he frequented in the declining years of his life. Although he did not share Yuri Samarin's radical enthusiasm for all things pre-Petrine, Kireyevsky extolled the spiritual treasures of medieval Russia. According to him, the monasteries of ancient Rus' "radiated a uniform and harmonious light of faith and learning" to disparate Slavonic tribes and principalities. The net of churches and monasteries covered Russia so thickly, that these 'bonds of spiritual community' unified the country into "a single living organism".

He died at the age of 50 during a cholera epidemic. His brother Pyotr outlived him for several months. They were buried side by side in the Optina Monastery, the first laymen to be honoured so.

== See also ==
- List of 19th-century Russian Slavophiles
