= Konstantin Aksakov =

Russian critic (1817–1860)

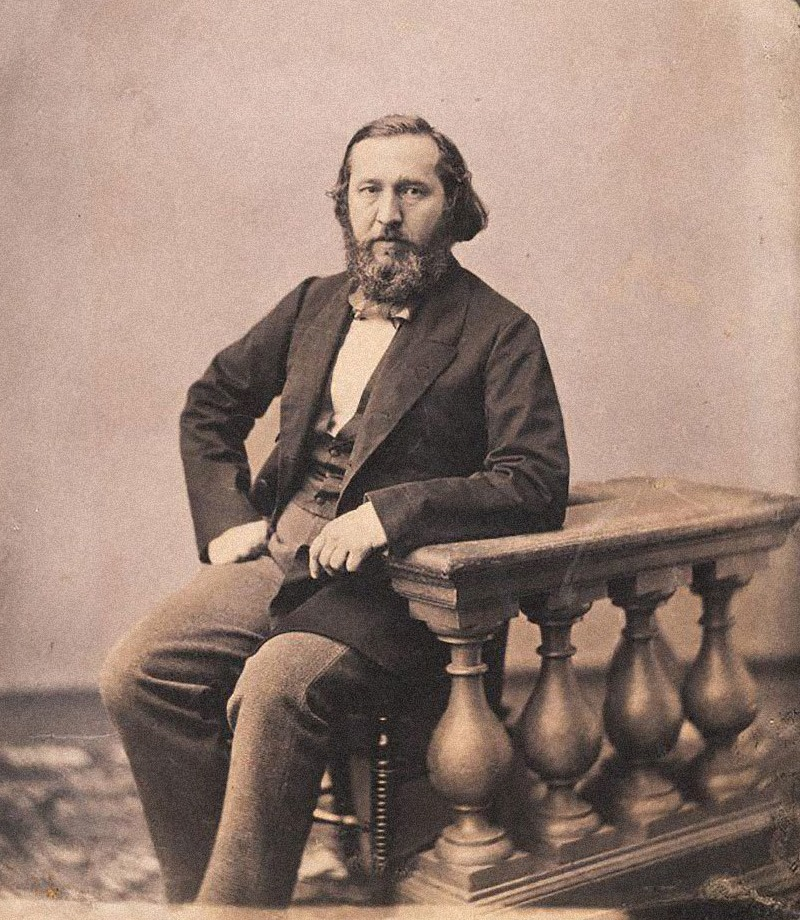
- Born: 29 March 1817; Novo-Aksakov, Orenburg Governorate, Russian Empire
- Died: 7 December 1860 (aged 43); Zakynthos, United States of the Ionian Islands
- Education: Imperial Moscow University (1835)

Konstantin Sergeyevich Aksakov (Russian: Константи́н Серге́евич Акса́ков; 10 April 1817 – 19 December 1860) was a Russian critic and writer. He became one of the earliest and most notable Slavophiles. He wrote plays, social criticism, and histories of the ancient Russian social order. His father Sergey Aksakov and his sister Vera Aksakova were writers, and his younger brother, Ivan Aksakov, was a journalist.

Konstantin Aksakov was the first to publish an analysis of Nikolai Gogol's 1842 work Dead Souls; he compared the author with Homer and with Shakespeare. In 1856, after Tsar Alexander II's accession to the throne in 1855, Aksakov sent the emperor a letter advising him to restore the zemsky sobor. Aksakov also penned a number of articles on Slavonic linguistics.

== Personal life ==
Aksakov was born into a family of prominent Russian writer Sergey Timofeevich Aksakov (1791—1859) and his wife Olga Semyonovna Zaplatina (1793—1878). His paternal grandfather Timofey Stepanovich Aksakov belonged to an old noble Aksakov family whose members claimed to be the decedents of Šimon. Their first documented ancestor was Ivan Feodorivich Velyaminov nicknamed Oksak who lived during the 15th century. His family crest was based on the Polish Przyjaciel coat of arms (also known as Aksak) which is considered to be of Tatar origin in Poland (the word «oksak» means «lame» in Turkic languages). All this led some researchers to believe that the Aksakov family also originated from Tatars, despite they had no relation to the Polish noble house. Aksakov's maternal grandfather was a Russian General Semyon Grigorievich Zaplatin who fought under the command of Alexander Suvorov and who married a Turkish captive Igel-Syum.

Aksakov was raised on a country estate before he moved to Moscow with his family. He remained with his parents his entire life, without ever marrying or moving out of the house. He studied at Moscow State University, and he became a member of the Stankevitch Circle, a group of Russian Hegelians and early believers of Russian democracy.

Aksakov eventually made the acquaintance of Ivan Kireyevsky and Aleksey Khomyakov, adopted their philosophy of Slavophilism and broke off all contact with the Stankevitch Circle.

== Philosophy ==
Aksakov's thesis on Mikhail Lomonosov (1846) attempted to synthesize his view of the Russian peasant's religious and historical mission with Hegel's philosophy. Aksakov influenced Alexander III, giving him his radical understanding that the "mission of autocracy in Russia is to give a certain well-being to the peasants." Later in his career, Aksakov abandoned Hegelian philosophy and became radically anti-European.

== See also ==
- List of 19th-century Russian Slavophiles

== Bibliography ==
- Imperial Moscow University: 1755-1917: encyclopedic dictionary. Moscow: Russian political encyclopedia (ROSSPEN). 2010. pp. 17–18. ISBN 978-5-8243-1429-8 – via A. Andreev, D. Tsygankov.
