= Catullus (crater) =

Crater on Mercury

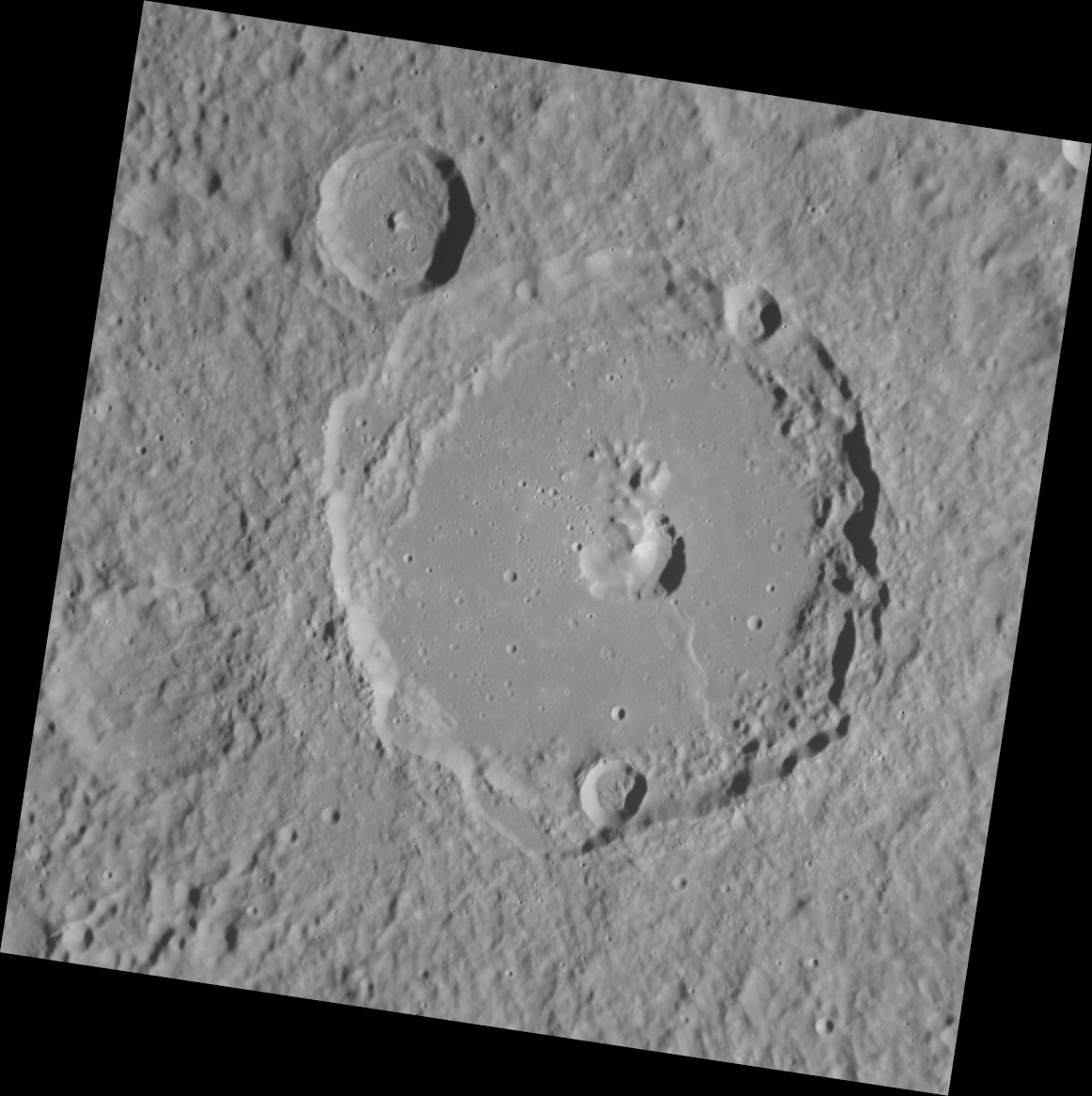
- MESSENGER WAC image of Catullus
- Feature type: Impact crater
- Location: Victoria quadrangle, Mercury
- Coordinates: 21.9°N 67.55°W
- Diameter: 100.2 km
- Eponym: Catullus

Catullus is a crater on Mercury. Its name was adopted by the International Astronomical Union (IAU) on December 19, 2012. Catullus is named for the Roman poet Catullus.

There is a depression near the center of the crater. Such depressions in similar craters (for example Glinka, Gibran, or Picasso) are thought to be caused by volcanism.

Hollows are present in Catullus, near the central peak complex.

To the northeast of Catullus is the large crater Praxiteles, and farther to the northwest is Aksakov. Between Catullus and Aksakov is an area classified as intracrater plains which have rough topography, as opposed to smooth plains (such as Apārangi Planitia or Borealis Planitia). The intracrater plains are saturated with secondary craters.

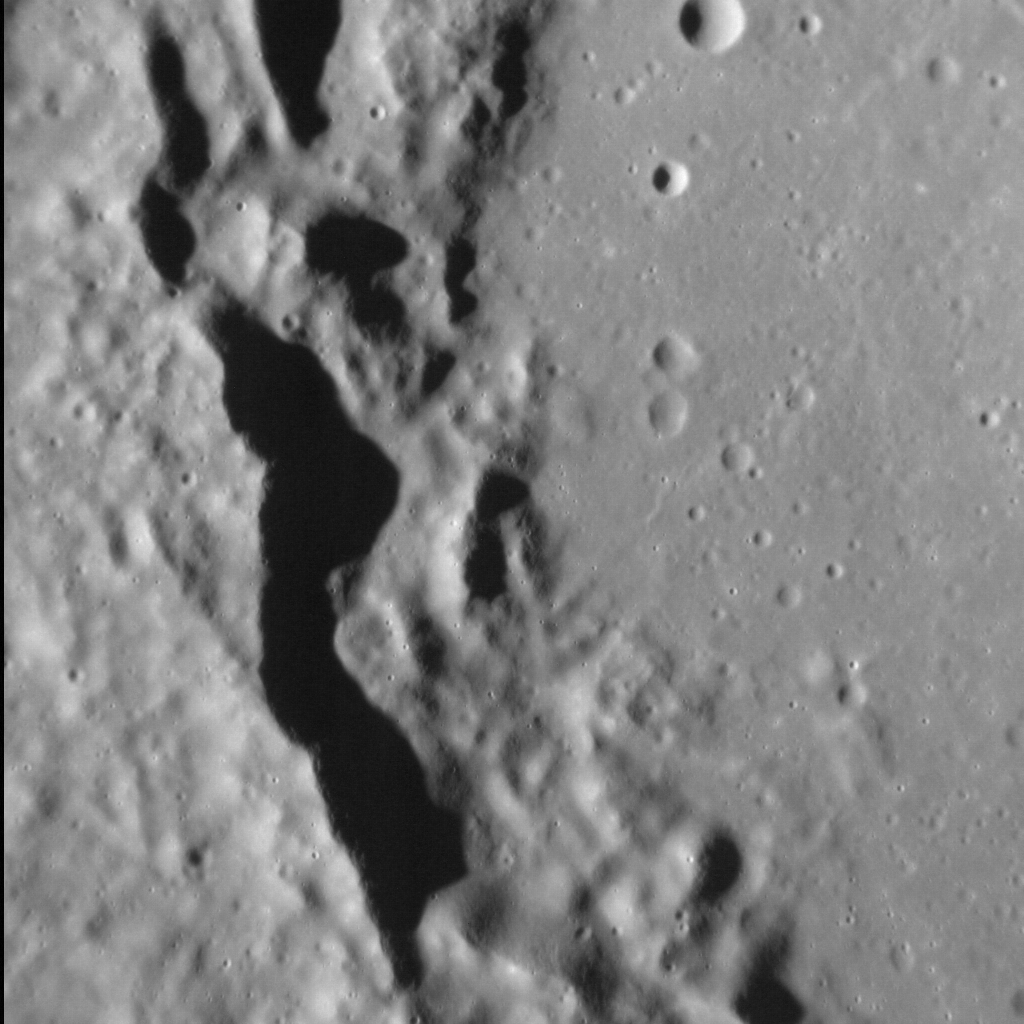
The rim of Catullus

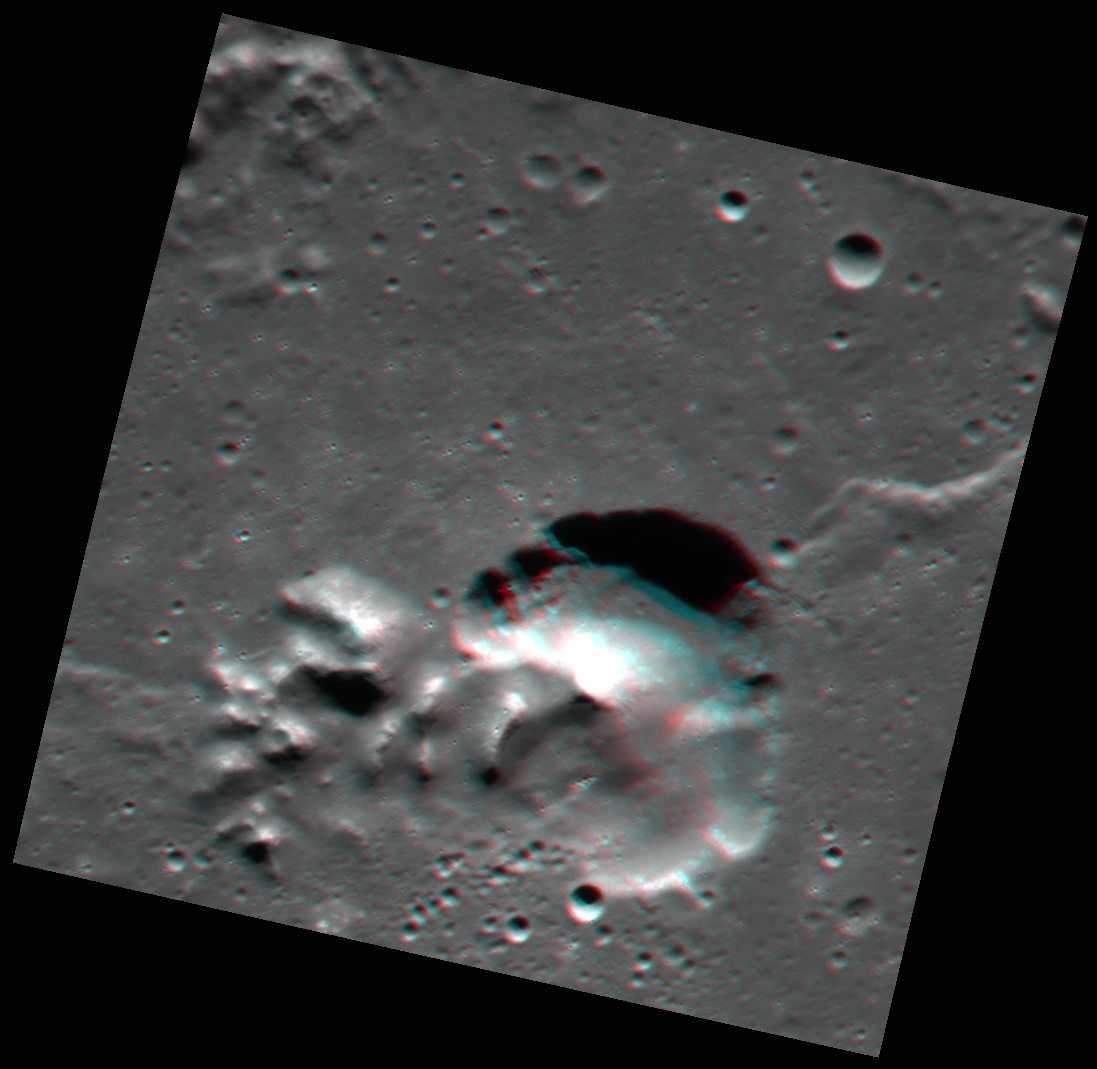
Anaglyph of the pit in the center of the crater

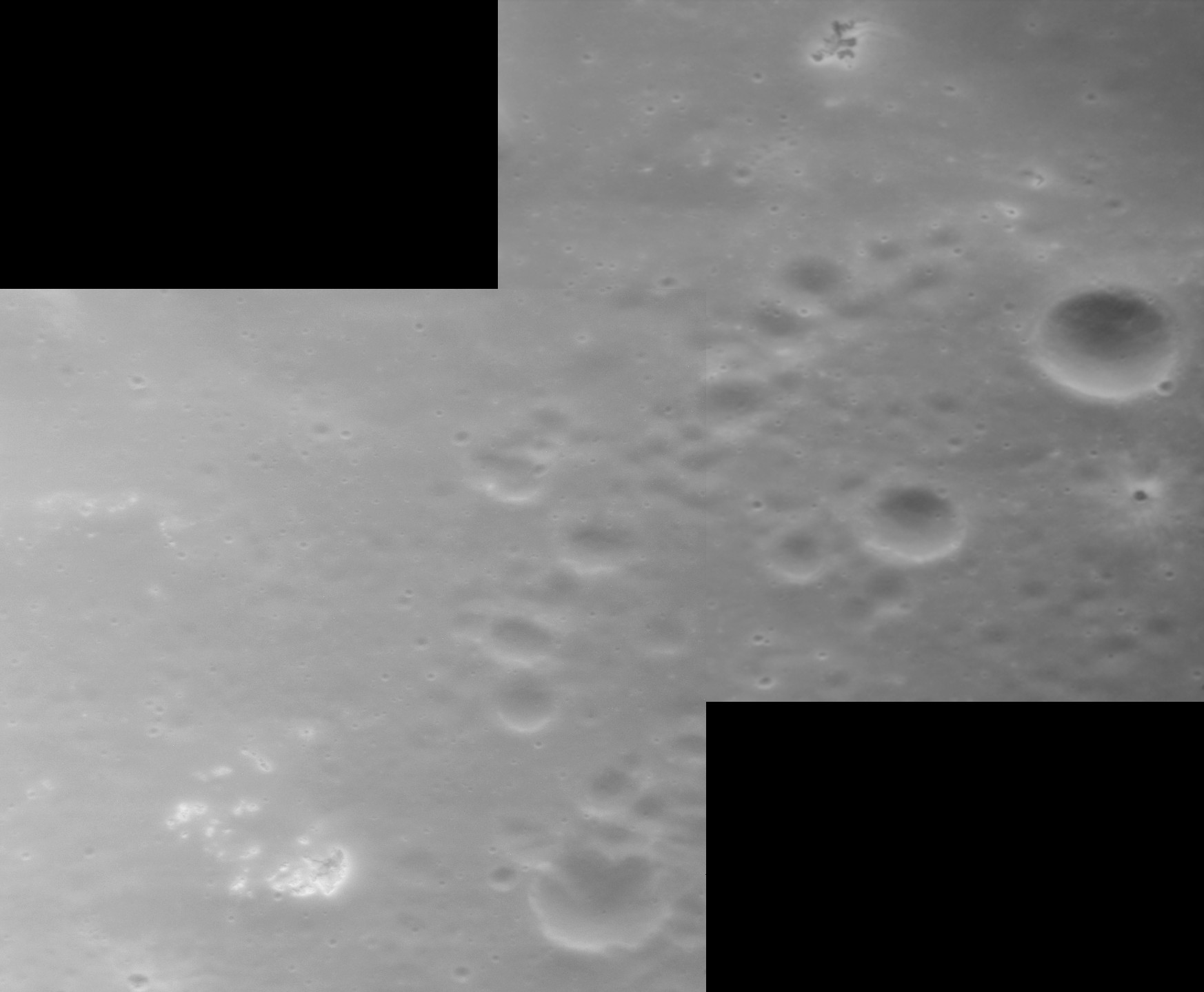
Hollows in Catullus crater
