= Nikolay Yazykov =

Russian poet (1803–1847)

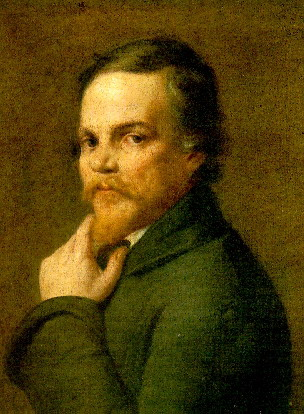
Nikolay Yazykov; portrait by Emmanuil Dmitriev-Mamonov.

Nikolay Mikhailovich Yazykov (Russian: Никола́й Миха́йлович Язы́ков; 16 March [O.S. 4 March] 1803 – January 7 1847 [O.S. December 26, 1846]) was a Russian poet and Slavophile who in the 1820s rivalled Alexander Pushkin and Yevgeny Baratynsky as the most popular poet of his generation.

== Biography ==
Yazykov was born in Simbirsk to an old family of Russian landlords. His first verses appeared in print in 1819. For seven years (1822-1829) Yazykov studied at the philosophy department of Dorpat University, where he made himself famous with his riotously Anacreontic verse in praise of the students' merry life. For his summer vacations he went to Trigorskoye, where he met Pushkin.

After leaving Dorpat, without a degree, Yazykov lived between Moscow and his Simbirsk estate. Later in life, he became intimate with the nationalist and Slavophile circles of Moscow, which held his poetry in high esteem. Nikolay Gogol, in particular, favoured Yazykov over all other living poets. The young idealists grouping around Nikolai Stankevich, however, dismissed his work as contemptibly lacking in ideas.

Yazykov's health, undermined by the excesses of his student life, began to fail very early, and from about 1835 he was a restless wanderer from one health resort to another. The Genoese Riviera, Nice, Gastein, and other German spas are the frequent background of his later verse. His spare time was devoted to collecting Russian folk poetry, in which task he was assisted by Pyotr Kireyevsky.

Apart from Pushkin, Yazykov was also close to Nikolay Gogol and was Khomyakov's brother-in-law. It was the death of his sister that triggered Gogol's fatal depression. According to his wishes, the great novelist was buried next to the Yazykovs in the Danilov Monastery. In 1931, the remains of Yazykov, Gogol and Khomyakov were reburied at the Novodevichy Cemetery.

D.S. Mirsky compared Yazykov to Gavrila Derzhavin for "his power of seeing nature as an orgy of light and color". Pushkin once joked that the Castalian fount of which Yazykov drank ran not with water, but with champagne. Indeed, his early (and best known) poetry is devoted to the praise of wine and merrymaking, producing an effect of the almost physical intoxication and verbal rush.

== Memory ==
- A Literary Museum has been opened in the House of Languages in Ulyanovsk (Sovetskaya str., 22).
- A memorial plaque is installed on the house where the poet was born (Lenin Street, 59).
- In Yazykovo (Yazykovo (manor)), a park and a pond were restored for the 150th anniversary of the poet's birth.
- In 2002, an Artistically labeled Envelope of Russia was released. Nikolai Mikhailovich Yazykov. The Russian poet is a Slavophile.
- In 2002, a Card with the original stamp of Russia was released. Nikolai Mikhailovich Yazykov. The Russian poet is a Slavophile.
- In 2003, the Ministry of Communications of Russia released KMK —Ulyanovsk. All-Russian philatelic exhibition "CULTURE AND PHILATELY" Ulyanovsk 2003. Dedicated to the 200th anniversary of the Russian poet N. M. Yazykov".
- In 2003, the Ministry of Communications of Russia released the KMK — Russian poet N. M. Yazykov. 1803-1847.
- In 2003, the Ministry of Communications of Russia released KMK — Ulyanovsk. The House Museum of N. M. Yazykov.
- In 2003, by the decision of the Ulyanovsk City Duma, N. M. Yazykov was awarded the title of "Honorary Citizen of the city of Ulyanovsk" (posthumously), which is the highest award of the municipal formation "City of Ulyanovsk".
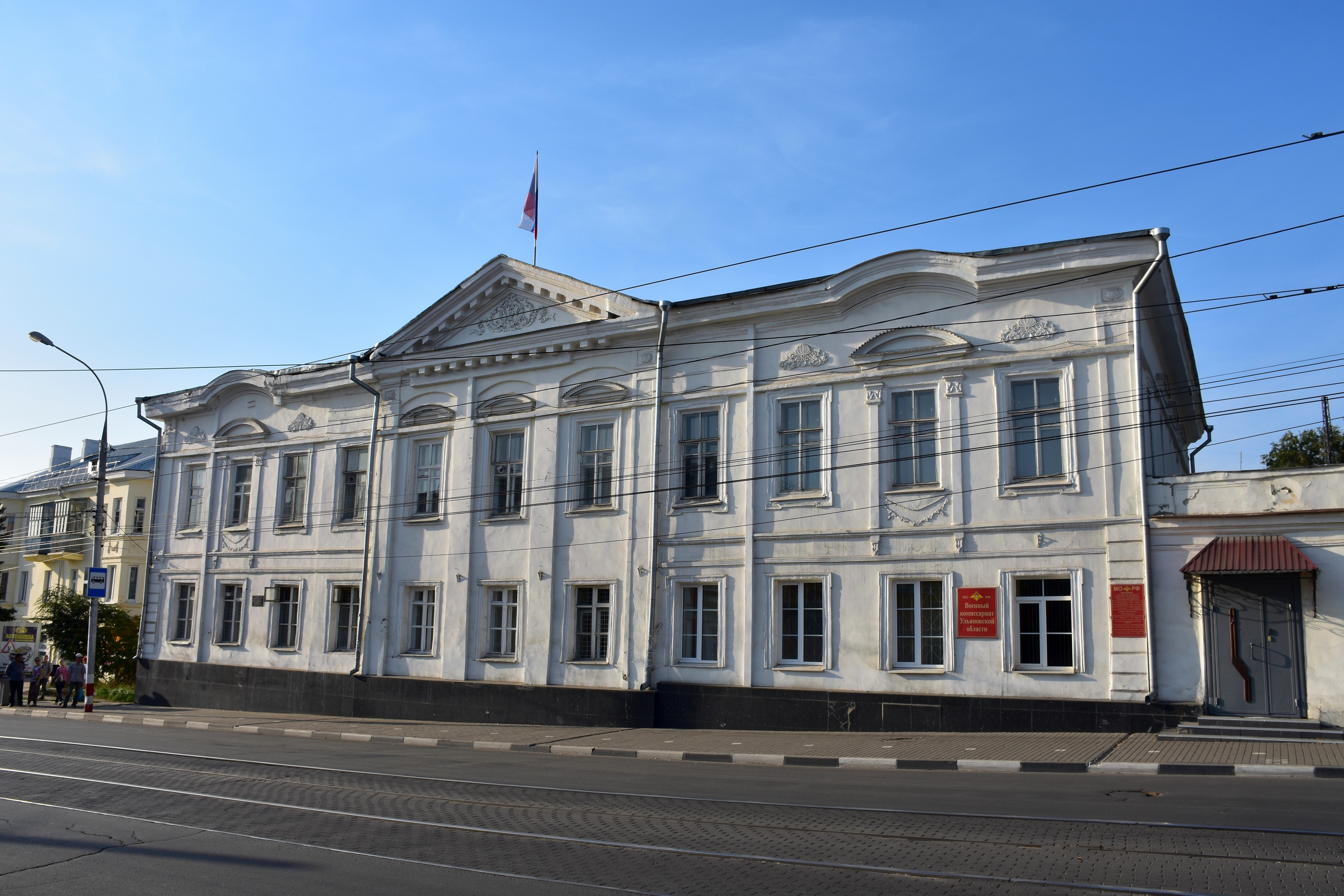
The house where Yazykov was born

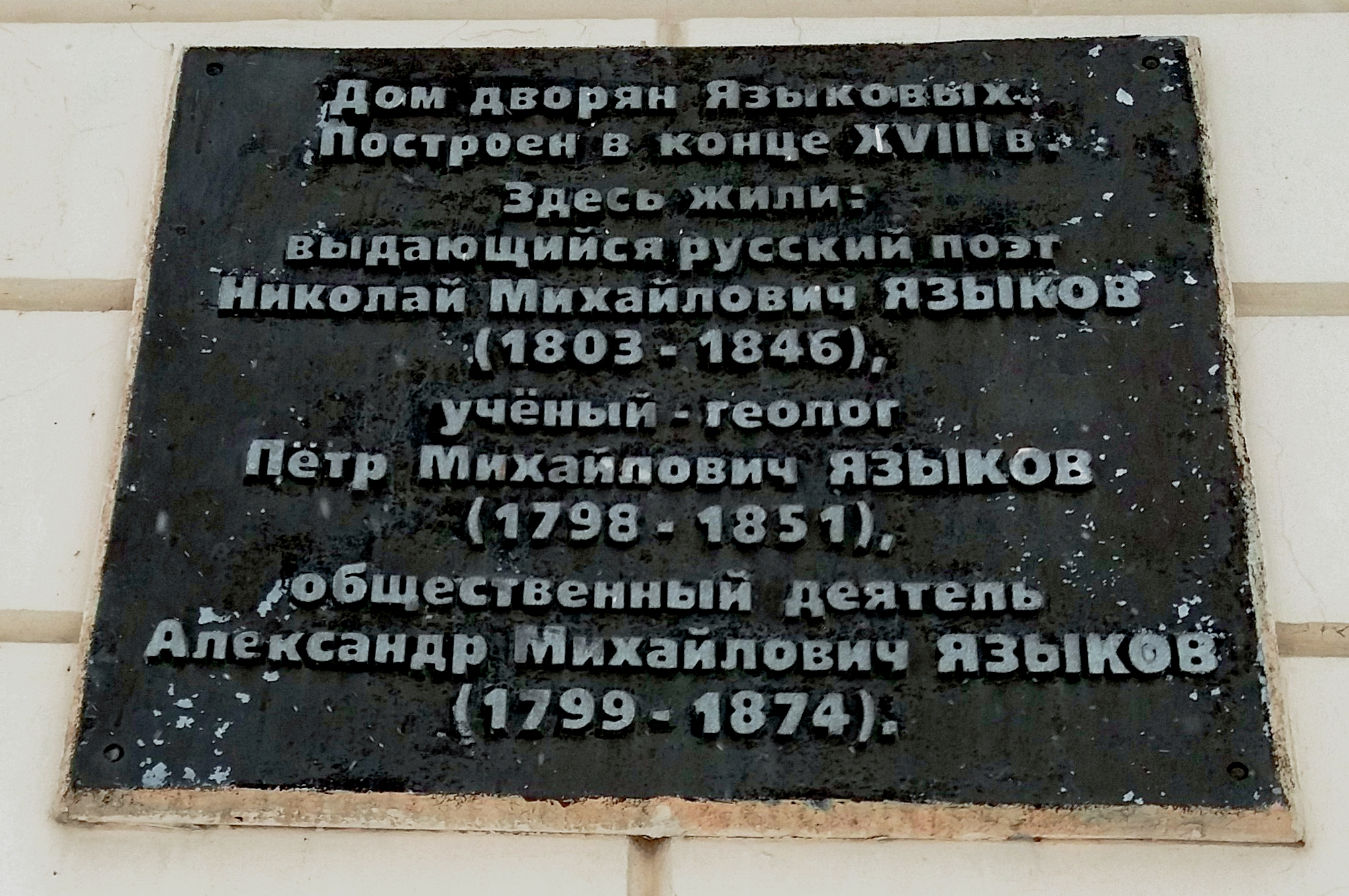
Memorial plaque on the House of Languages

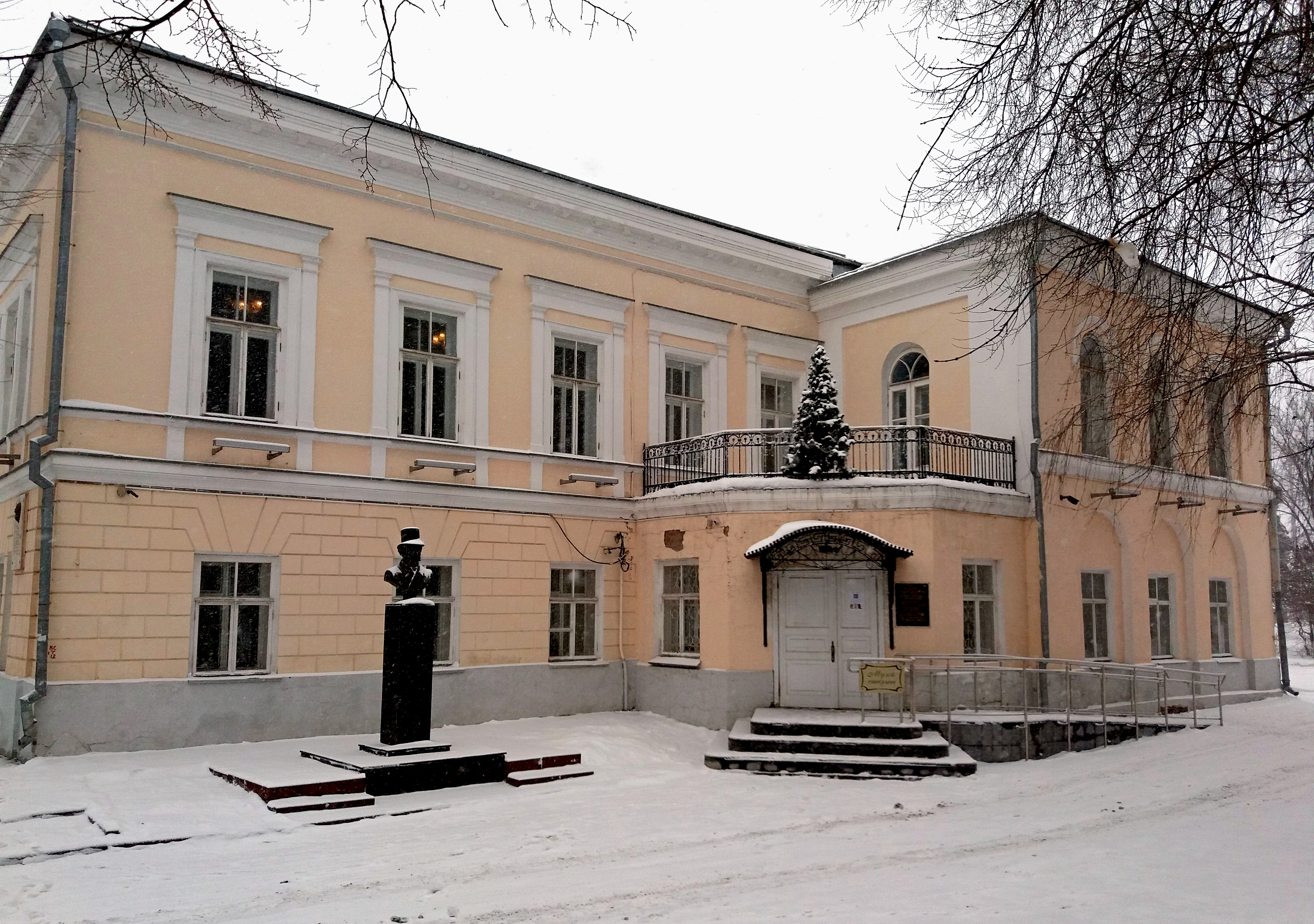
Literary Museum "House of Languages"

== See also ==
- List of 19th-century Russian Slavophiles
