= Andrey Denyer =

Russian photographer (1820–1892)

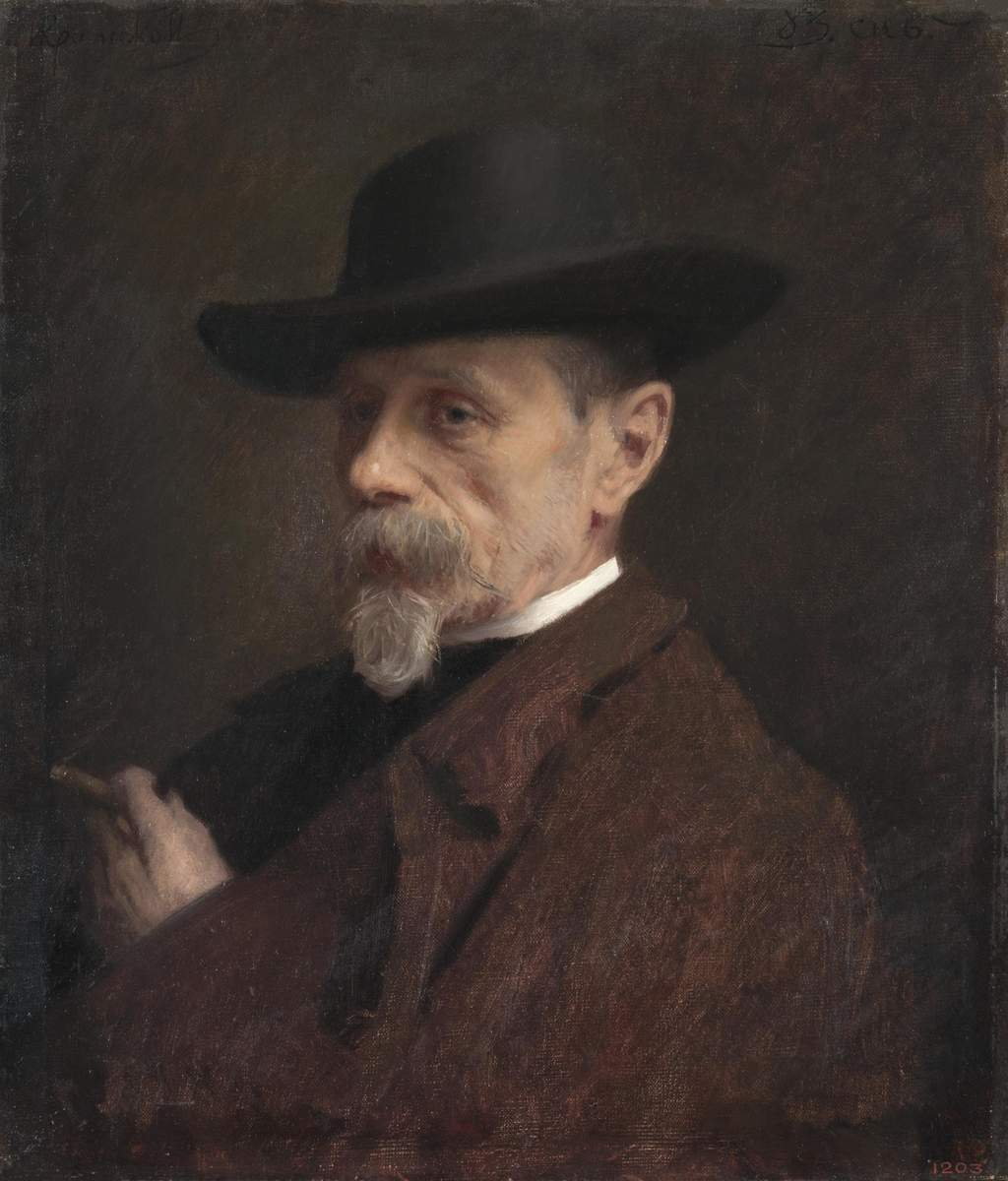
Ivan Kramskoi, Andrey Denyer, 1883, oils; Russian Museum, St. Petersburg

Heinrich Johann Denier, russified as Andrey Ivanovich Denyer, (1820, Mogilev - 3 March 1892, St. Petersburg) was a Russian photographer of Swiss descent, particularly known for his portraits.

== Biography ==
He was born to an immigrant family from Switzerland. After completing his primary education in Mogilev, he enrolled at the Imperial Academy of Fine Arts, where he studied history painting under the tutelage of Karl Bryullov. During those years, he also developed an interest in the new art of photography.

In 1849, he graduated from the Academy. Two years later, he opened his own small daguerreotype studio, although he was already using with glass plates. In 1854, he was able to move to a larger studio on Nevsky Prospect. He advertised it as an "artist's studio", in an effort to stand out from his competition, experimenting with watercolor enhanced photographs, and was one of the first photographers in Russia to use the collodion process.

In 1860, he was awarded the title "Photographer of Their Imperial Majesties", which allowed him to place the state emblem on his signboard. Three years later, he moved to an even larger studio, which he would operate until his death. During this time, he began participating in numerous national and international exhibitions. In 1865, he was elected a member of the Société française de photographie. Several artists and photographers who would later become famous worked as retouchers in his studio, including Ivan Kramskoi and Mikhail Tulinov. The catalogue of the works he presented at the Exposition Universelle (1867) noted that his workshop had eighteen employees.

At the All-Russian Manufacturing Exhibition of 1870, he received a silver medal. He was awarded a large gold medal for his assistance in organizing the photography pavilion at the Polytechnic Exhibition of 1872. During the 1870s, he had several showings in London.

He retired in 1890. His studio was purchased by Robert Pel (1855-1926), the son of Vasily Pel, owner of one of the oldest pharmacies in the Russian Empire. That same year, he became a Russian citizen. He died two years later, aged seventy-two, and was interred at Volkovo Cemetery.

== Selected portraits ==
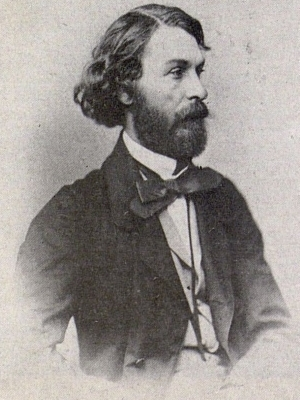
Dmitri Grigorovich

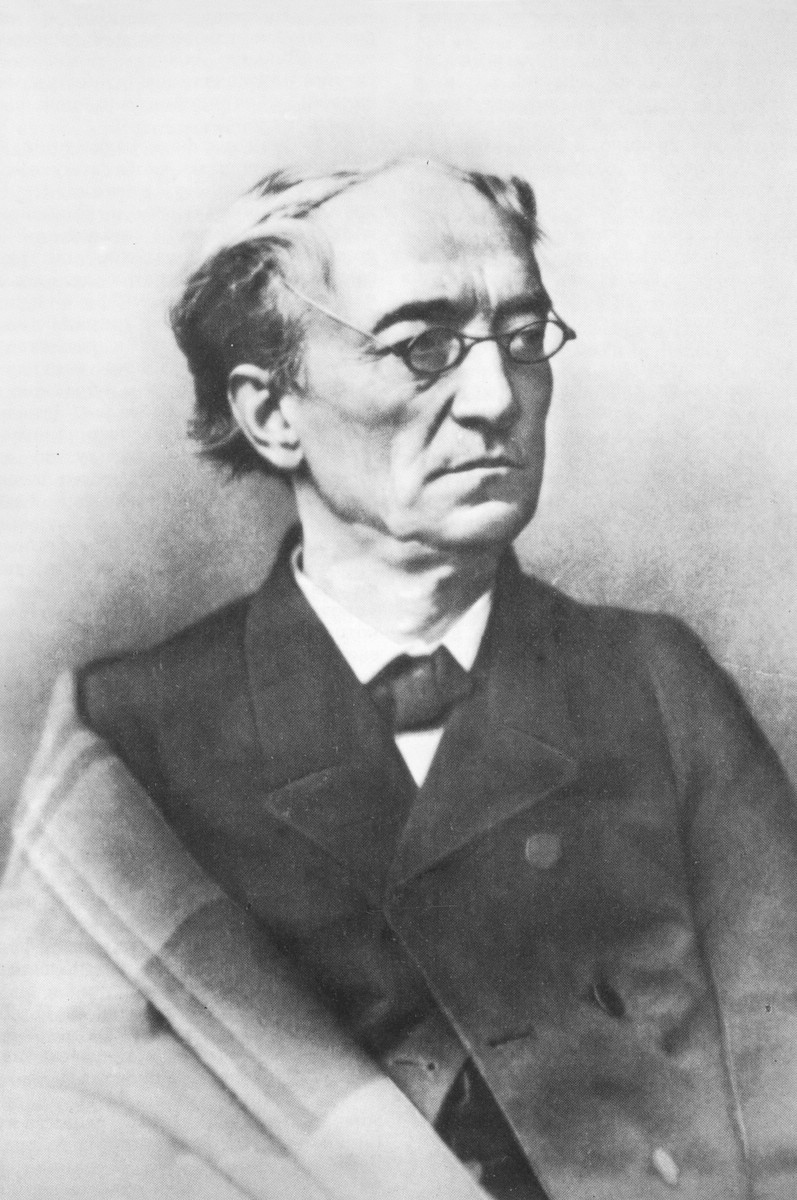
Fyodor Tyutchev

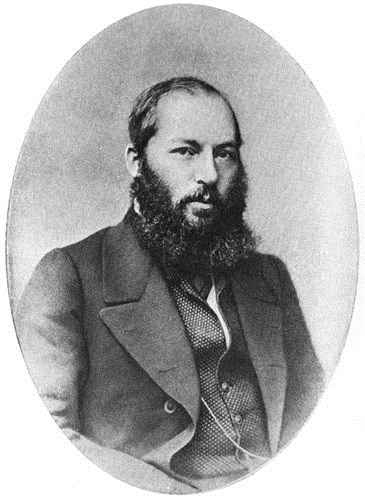
Afanasy Fet

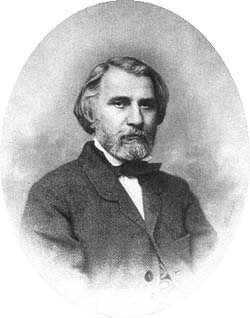
Ivan Turgenev

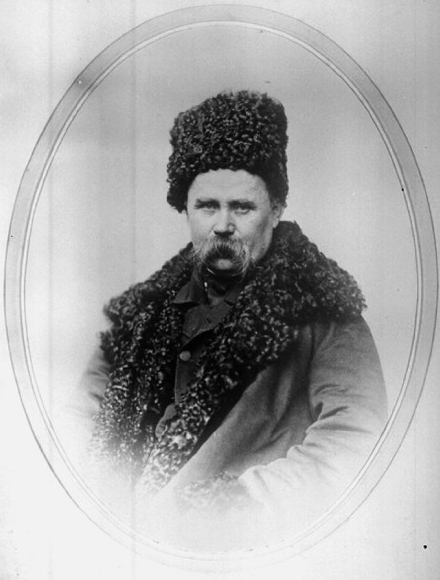
Taras Shevchenko

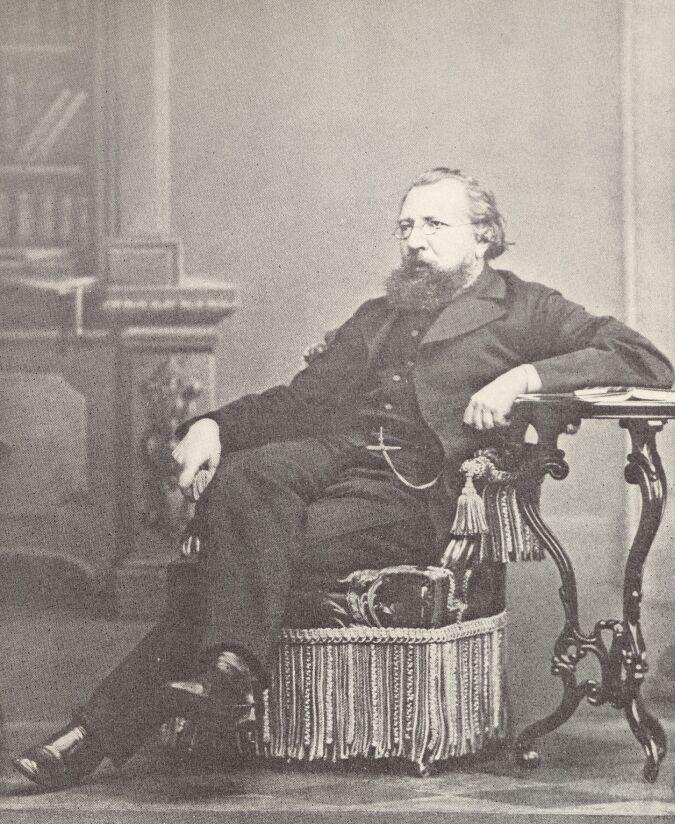
Ivan Aksakov
