= Vera Aksakova =

Russian writer

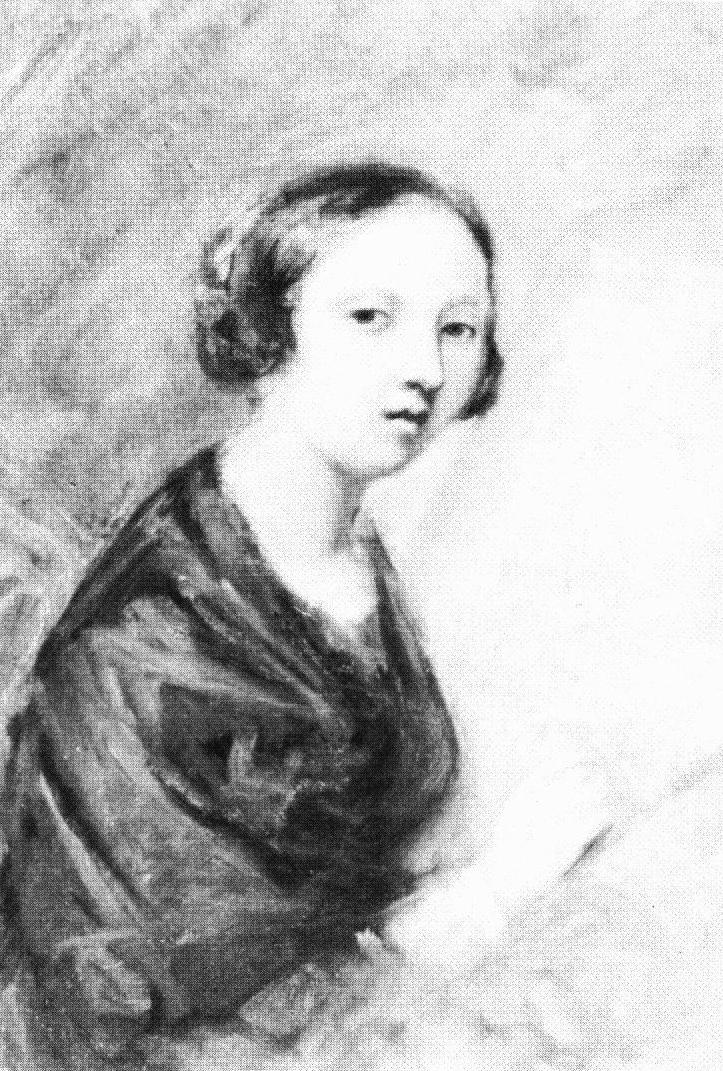
- self portrait
- Born: 19 February 1819; Nova Aksakovo
- Died: 9 March 1864 (aged 45); Moscow

Vera Sergeyevna Aksakova or Vera Axakova (Russian: Вера Сергеевна Аксакова; 19 February 1819 – 9 March 1864) was a Russian writer known for her diaries at the time of the Crimean War in a Slavophile family.

== Life ==
Aksakova was born in Moscow in 1819. She was the eldest daughter of Sergey Aksakov and his wife Olga Semyonovna Zaplatina (1793–1878). Her mother was the daughter of Major General Semyon Grigorievich Zaplatina and a captured Turkish woman. Her brothers Konstantin and Ivan Aksakov were both noted Slavophiles. When her father began to write "The History of My Acquaintance with Gogol" she acted as his assistant and as he lost his eyesight she became his amanuensis.

Aksakova is known for her diary which gives an interesting insight into Russian life during the Crimea War. It starts on 14 November 1854 and ends a year later on 15 November. She reports hopefully on the death of Tsar Nicholas I in a three-page entry. She feels regret that a man has died but is optimistic about his successor. She later records the loss of national prestige with her country's defeat at the Siege of Sebastopol.
