= Dmitry Venevitinov =

Russian poet (1805–1827)

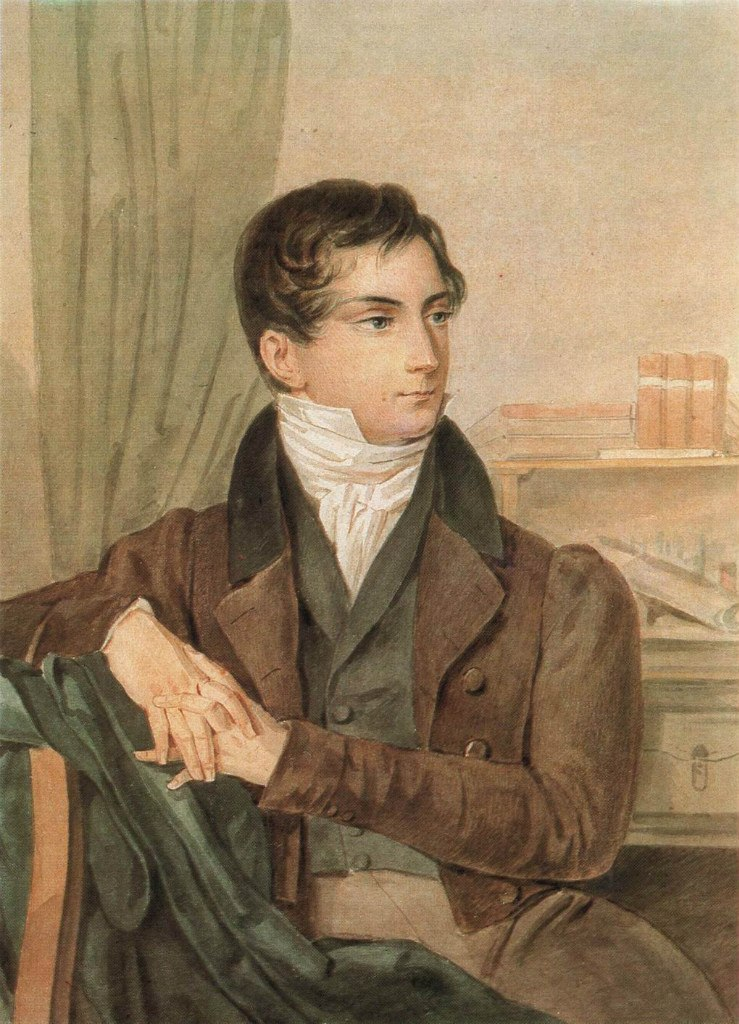
- Born: Dmitry Vladimirovich Venevitinov; September 26, 1805; Moscow, Russia
- Died: March 15, 1827 (aged 21); Saint Petersburg, Russia
- Education: Moscow University

Dmitry Vladimirovich Venevitinov (Russian: Дми́трий Влади́мирович Веневи́тинов; 26 September [O.S. 14 September] 1805 – 27 March [O.S. 15 March] 1827) was a minor Russian Romantic poet who died (perhaps committed suicide) at the age of 21, carrying with him one of the greatest hopes of Russian literature. He was one of the Russian Schellingians.

== Biography ==
Of noble parentage, Venevitinov entered the Moscow University in 1824. He became a member of the circle of "wisdom-lovers" (Lyubomudry), led by Prince Vladimir Odoevsky. Venevitinov and his friends were the young Idealists who introduced into Russia the cult of Goethe and Schelling's metaphysics.

Venevitinov's poems (of which there are forty) dwell on philosophical subjects. According to D.S. Mirsky, "his diction is very pure, and his rhythms pure and majestic". In one of his better known poems, Venevitinov vainly pleaded Pushkin to address an ode to Goethe.

Venevitinov's early death was lamented by a number of Russian poets and critics. His line "Kak znal on zhizn'! kak malo zhil!" (How well he knew life! how little he did live!) was carved on his tomb at the Simonov Monastery. The Soviets had his remains moved to the Novodevichy Cemetery.
