= Sergey Aksakov =

Russian writer (1791–1859)

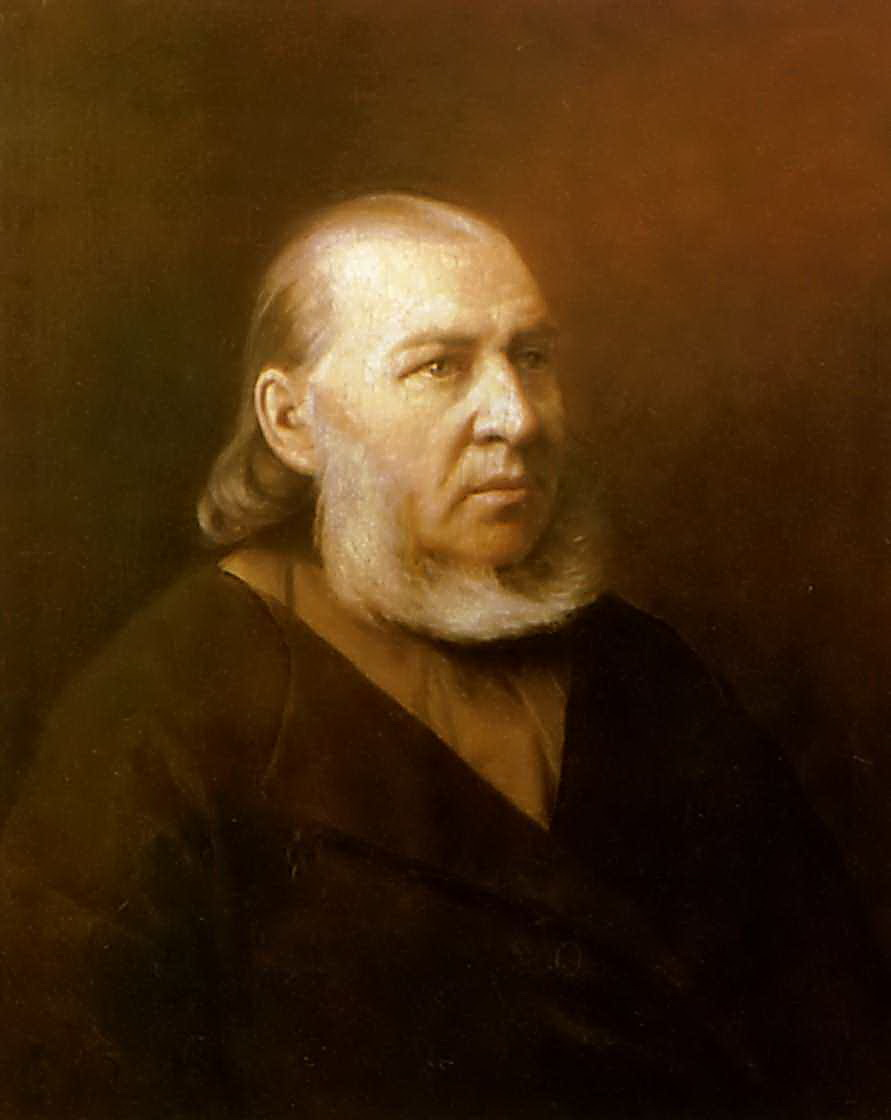
- Portrait of Aksakov by Vasily Perov
- Born: 1 October 1791; Ufa, Ufa Governorate, Russian Empire
- Died: 12 May 1859 (aged 67); Moscow, Russian Empire
- Children: Ivan Aksakov; Konstantin Aksakov; Vera Aksakova
- Relatives: Alexandr Aksakov
- Writing career
- Period: 1810s-1850s

Sergey Timofeyevich Aksakov (Russian: Серге́й Тимофе́евич Акса́ков, Russian pronunciation: [sʲɪrˈɡʲej tʲɪmɐˈfʲejɪvʲɪtɕ ɐˈksakəf]) (1 October [O.S. 20 September] 1791—12 May [O.S. 30 April] 1859) was a 19th-century Russian literary figure remembered for his semi-autobiographical tales of family life, as well as his books on hunting and fishing.

== Early life ==
According to the Velvet Book of Russian genealogy, the Aksakovs trace their male line to Šimon, a Varangian nephew of Haakon the Old, who settled in Novgorod in 1027. Their first documented ancestor was Ivan Feodorivich Velyaminov nicknamed Oksak who lived during the 15th century. His family crest was based on the Polish Przyjaciel coat of arms (also known as Aksak) which is considered to be of Tatar origin in Poland (the word «oksak» means «lame» in Turkic languages). All this led some researches to believe that the Aksakov family also originated from Tatars, despite having no relation to the Polish noble house.

Sergey was born in Ufa and brought up there and in the family estate at Novo-Aksakovka in Orenburg guberniya, where he acquired a lifelong love of nature. He was also introduced to literature by his mother at an early age, and became especially fond of Mikhail Kheraskov's Rossiada and the tragedies of Alexander Sumarokov.

He was educated at the Kazan Gymnasium and then, in 1805 (in the first year after its founding), at Kazan University, though he himself said he was ill-prepared for university education (and some of the professors, brought from abroad, taught in foreign languages). He was also distracted by his obsessive interest in the theater.

== Career ==
He left the university in 1807, and the following year went to St. Petersburg to take up government service, for which he was also poorly prepared. Again, he spent considerable time at the theater, and his acquaintance with the conservative Admiral Shishkov strengthened his preference for classical Russian literature and introduced him to the Lovers of the Russian Word. He resigned from the civil service in 1811 and moved to Moscow, where he was active as an amateur in literary and theatrical life and published his first verse anonymously in 1812.

Aksakov enlisted in the militia and took part in the Campaign of 1812; afterwards he settled for the quiet life of a sporting country squire at his estate of Aksakovo in Orenburg guberniya, where he stayed from 1816 until 1826, after which he was usually in Moscow. In 1816 he married Olga Semenovna Zaplatina, and the couple had six sons and eight daughters. His eldest daughter Vera Aksakova who was born in 1819 was also a noted author.

He began publishing translations, reviews, and articles in the early 1820s, though his important work came much later. In 1827 he was appointed to the Moscow Censorship Committee, from which he was dismissed in 1832 for allowing the publication of a "scurrilous" pamphlet on drunken policemen; in 1833 he became an inspector at the Grand Duke Constantine School of Surveying, and in 1835 the first director of the Constantine Geodetic Institute (Konstantinovsky mezhevoi institut). He retired from the civil service in 1838.

In 1832 he met Nikolai Gogol "and recognized in him what he had failed to see in Púshkin or any other man—a purely Russian genius. Aksakov's house, a stronghold of pure Russianism in Moscow society, became the temple of the cult of Gogol, and Aksakov its high priest." It was Gogol who revealed to Aksakov the possibility of creating literature based directly on life, without forcing it into the mold of classical forms. In 1834 Aksakov published his first realistic story, "A Blizzard." Around 1840, encouraged by Gogol, he began writing the book that would make him famous, A Family Chronicle. While he was working on that, he published books about two of his favorite activities since his youth, Notes on Fishing (1847) and Notes of a Hunter in Orenburg Province (1852). Their "limpid style and concrete content," which were "almost unique in Russian literature," were appreciated by contemporaries; Ivan Turgenev reviewed them enthusiastically, and Gogol wrote Aksakov, "Your birds and fishes are more alive than my men and women."

== Later life ==
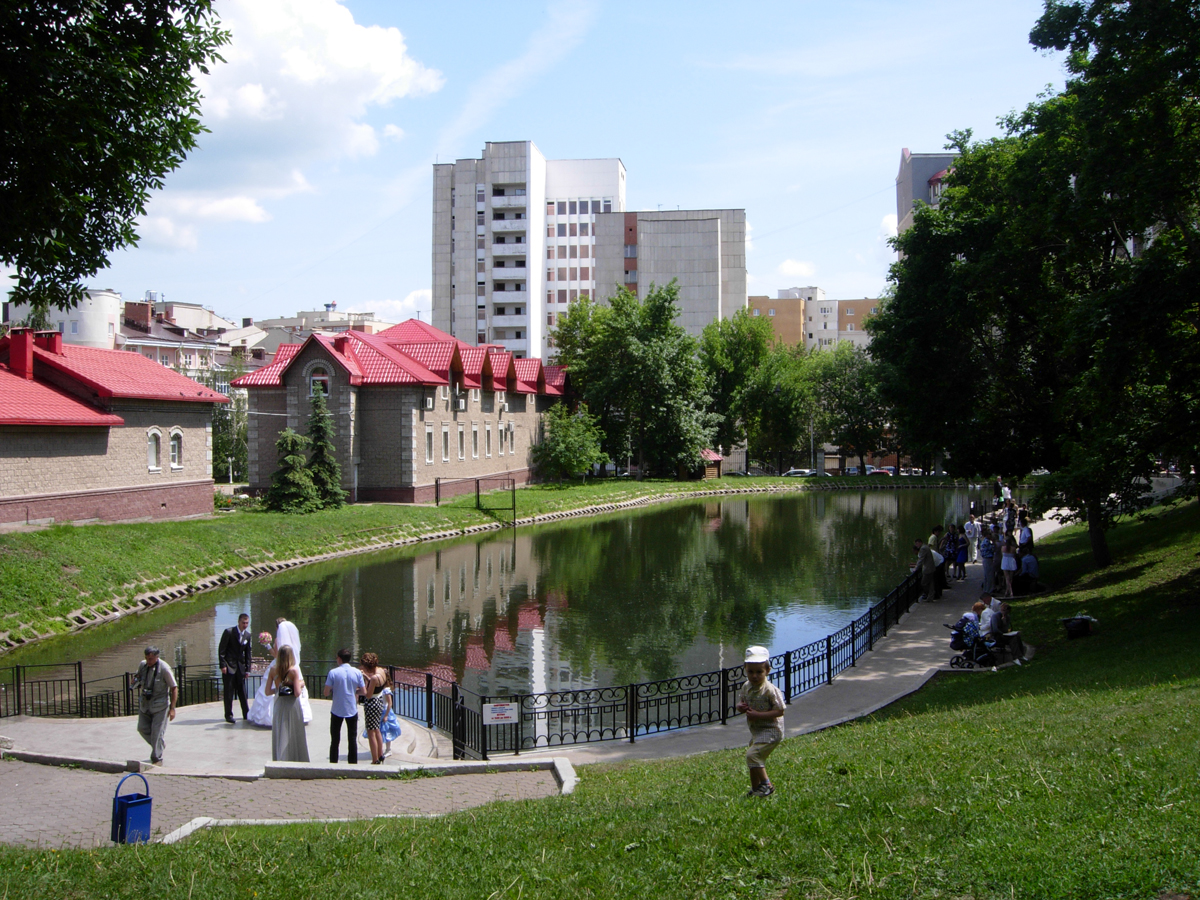
Aksakov garden in Ufa, named in honor of Sergey Aksakov

In 1843 Aksakov settled in the village of Abramtsevo, near Moscow, where he entertained writers including Gogol, Turgenev, and Tolstoy and which was also frequented by his Slavophile sons, Konstantin and Ivan. In the late 1850s he published his most enduring works, The Family Chronicle (Semeinaya khronika, 1856; translated as A Russian Gentleman) and Childhood Years of Bagrov Grandson (Detskie gody Bagrova-vnuka, 1858, translated as Years of Childhood). These reminiscences of a childhood spent in a Russian patriarchal family "brought Aksakov recognition as a literary artist of the first rank." Aksakov's semi-autobiographical narratives are unmatched for their scrupulous and detailed description of the everyday life of the Russian nobility.

Among Aksakov's other works are The History of My Acquaintance with Gogol (Istoriya moego znakomstva s Gogolem, published 1890 [written in 1830s and 1840s]); Memoirs (Vospominaniya, 1856, translated as A Russian Schoolboy), and Collecting Butterflies (Sobiranie babochek, 1858). His fairy tale The Scarlet Flower was adapted into an animated feature film in the Soviet Union in 1952.

== Family ==
Aksakov married Olga Semyonovna Zaplatina who was the daughter of Major General Semyon Grigorievich Zaplatin and a captured Turkish woman. They had four sons (Konstantin, Gregory, Ivan and Mikhail) and seven daughters (Vera, Olga, Nadezhda, Anna, Lyubov, Maria, and Sophia).

== Memory ==
- A crater on the planet Mercury has been named in his honor.

== English translations ==
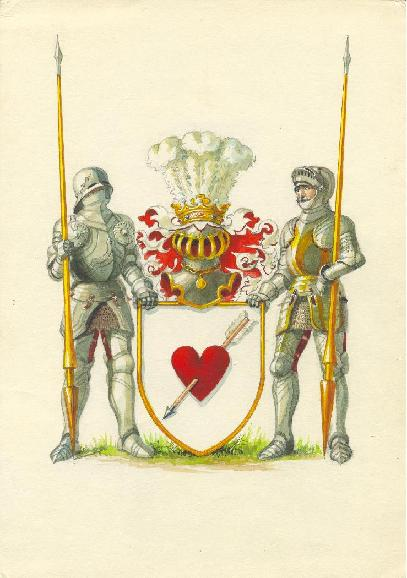
The Aksakov Family Coat of Arms.

- Years of Childhood. Translated by James Duff Duff. London: Edward Arnold. 1916 – via Internet Archive.
- A Russian Schoolboy, E. Arnold, London, 1917, tr. by J. D. Duff. from Archive.org
- A Russian Gentleman, E. Arnold, London, 1917, tr. by J. D. Duff. from Archive.org
- The Family Chronicle, E. P. Dutton & Co., New York, 1961, tr. by M. C. Beverley.
- Notes on Fishing, Northwestern University Press, Evanston, 1997, tr. by Thomas P. Hodge.
- Notes of a Provincial Wildfowler, Northwestern University Press, Evanston, 1998, tr. by Kevin Windle.
