= Yuri Samarin =

Russian philosopher (1819–1876)

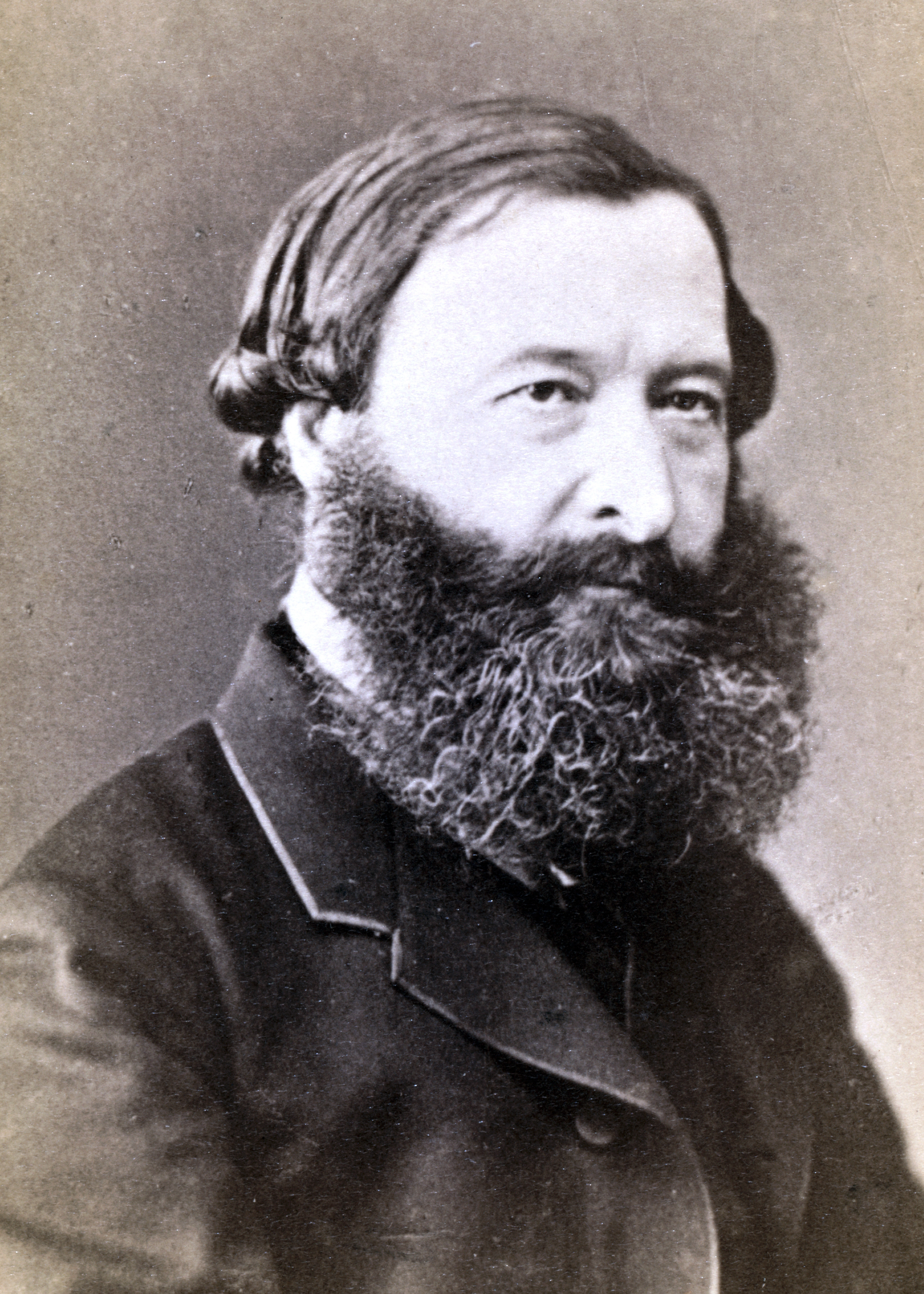
Samarin between 1870 and 1876

Yuri Fyodorovich Samarin (Russian: Ю́рий Фёдорович Сама́рин; 3 May 1819, Saint Petersburg – 31 March 1876, Berlin) was a leading Russian Slavophile thinker and one of the architects of the Emancipation reform of 1861.

He came from a noble family and befriended Konstantin Aksakov from an early age. An ardent admirer of Hegel and Khomyakov, Samarin attended the Moscow University, where his teachers included Mikhail Pogodin. He came to believe that "Orthodoxy, and Orthodoxy alone, is a religion which philosophy can recognize" and that "the Orthodox church cannot exist apart from Hegel's philosophy". Samarin's dissertation was a study of Feofan Prokopovich's influence on the Russian Orthodox Church.

He later joined the government service and settled in Riga, where the well entrenched influence of Baltic German nobility exasperated him to such a degree that he urged the government to step up Russification activities in the region. This outburst of chauvinism led to his brief imprisonment in the Peter and Paul Fortress. (Samarin's Slavophilism passed for Pan-Slavism, which was viewed by Nicholas I as a "rebellious doctrine").

In his latter years, Samarin continued to write copiously on national and "peasant" questions, advocating the step-by-step abolition of serfdom. After the January Uprising he advised Nikolai Milyutin to support Polish peasantry as the embodiment of "the Slavic soul" of Poland at the expense of "the forces of Latinism", i.e., rebellious nobility and Catholic clergy. He died in Berlin of sepsis and was buried next to Khomyakov in the Danilov Monastery.
