= Aksakov (crater) =

Crater on Mercury

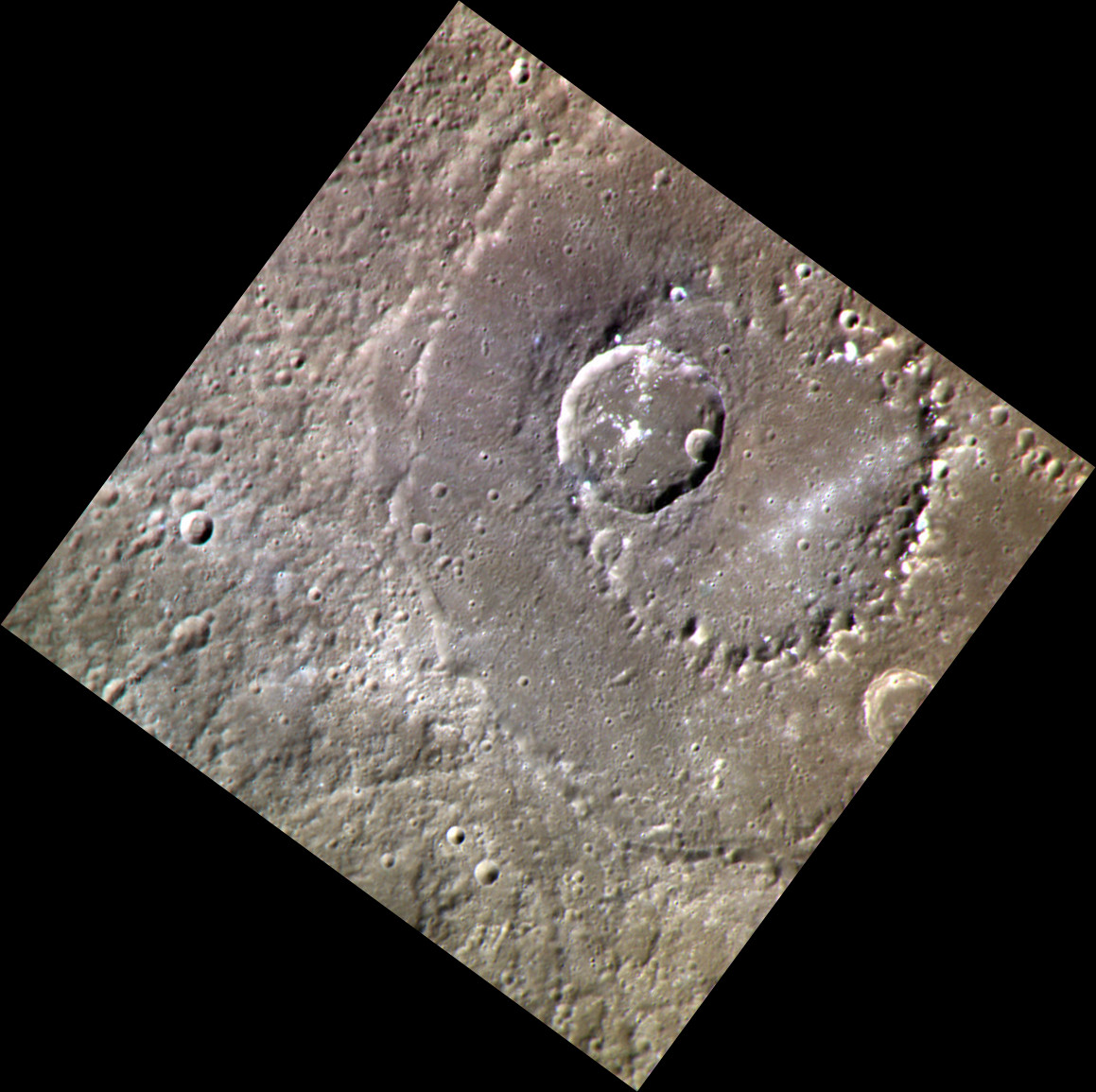
- Approximate color image by MESSENGER WAC
- Feature type: Peak-ring impact basin
- Location: Victoria quadrangle, Mercury
- Coordinates: 34.71°N 78.74°W
- Diameter: 174 km (108 mi)
- Eponym: Sergey Aksakov

Aksakov is a crater on Mercury. It has a diameter of 174 kilometers. Its name was adopted by the International Astronomical Union (IAU) on April 24, 2012. Aksakov is named for the Russian author Sergey Aksakov, who lived from 1791 to 1859 C.E.

Aksakov is one of 110 peak ring basins on Mercury. Hollows are present along parts of the peak ring and within the unnamed 30-km crater in the interior.

== Gallery ==
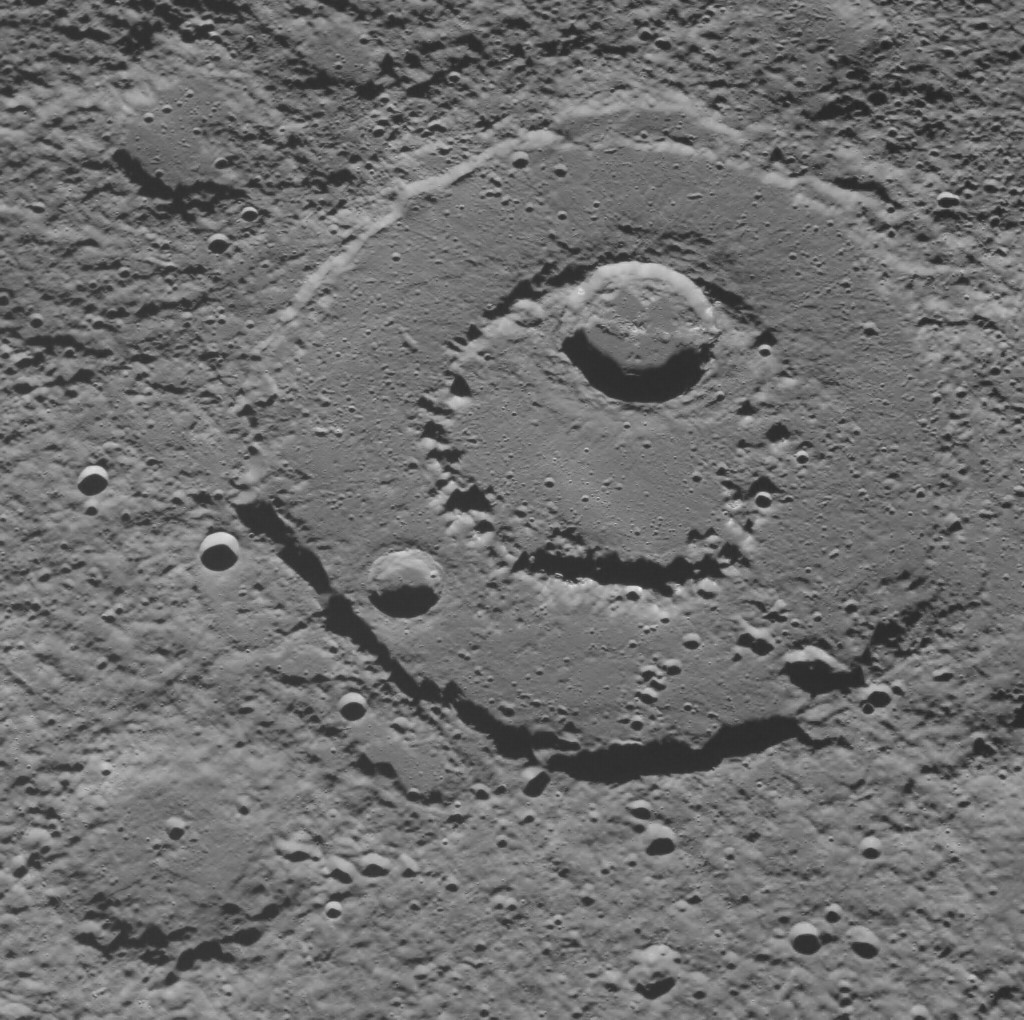
Oblique MESSENGER image at low sun angle

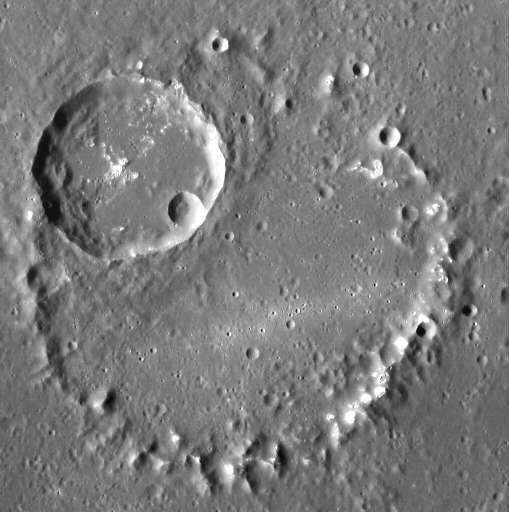
The central peak ring. The bright patches are hollows.

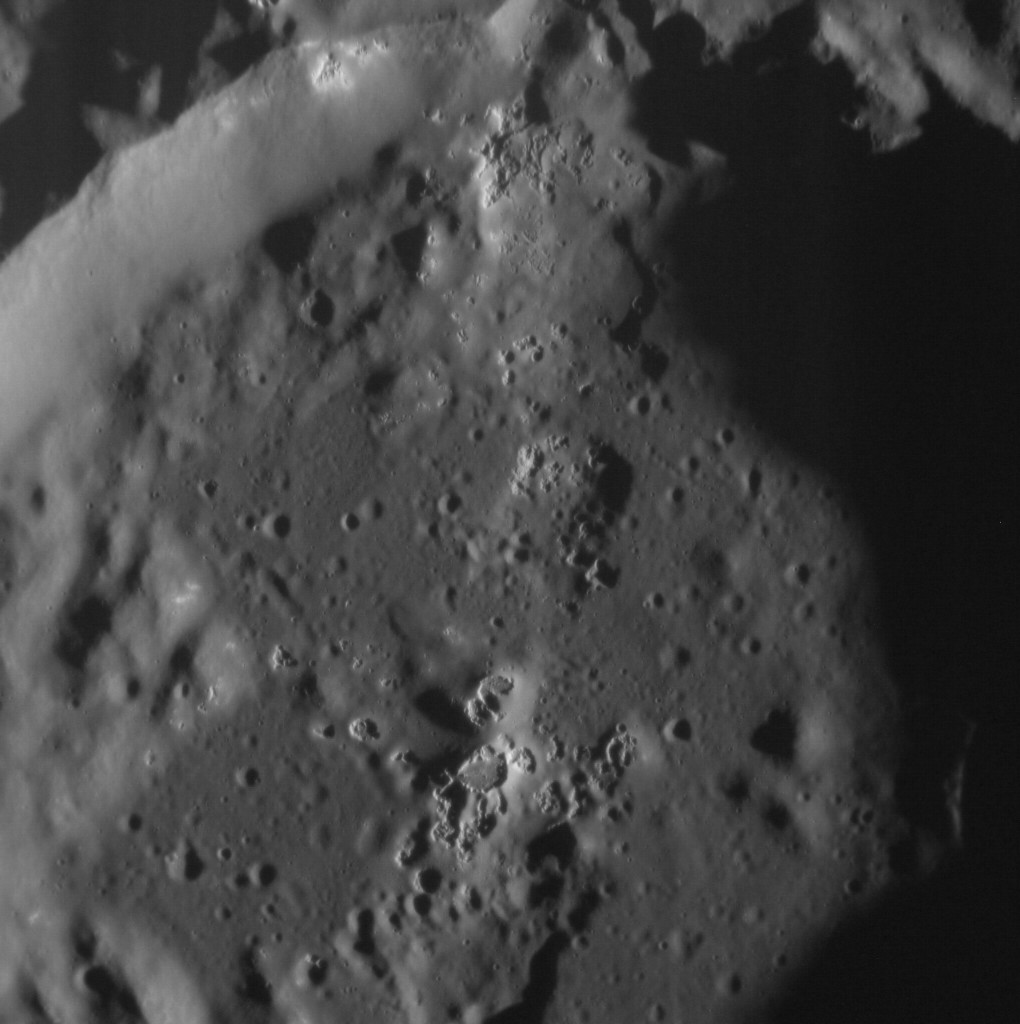
Hollows within the 30-km crater

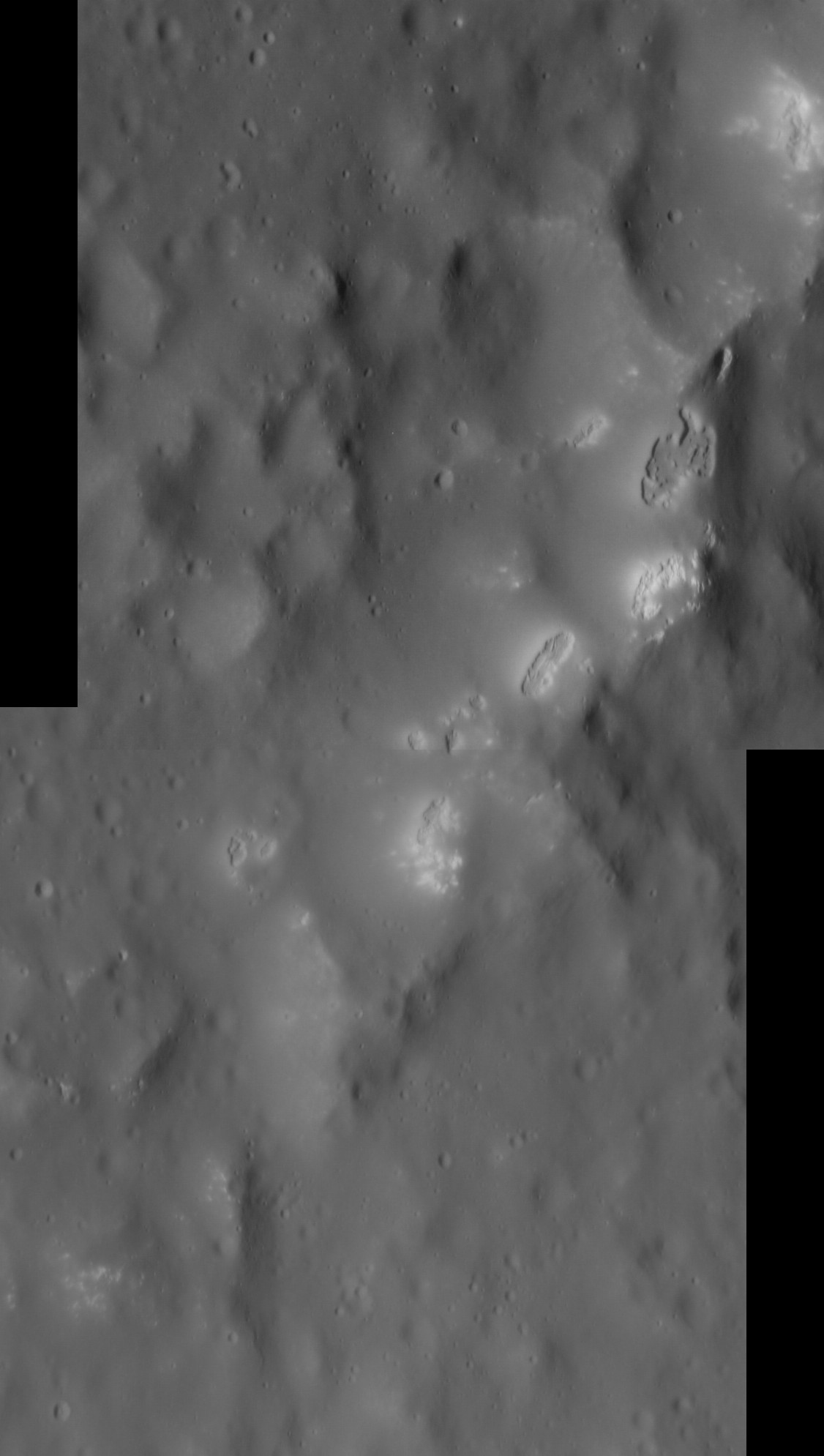
Hollows along the southeastern peak ring
