= Belebeyevsky Uyezd =

Subdivision of Ufa Governorate, Russian Empire

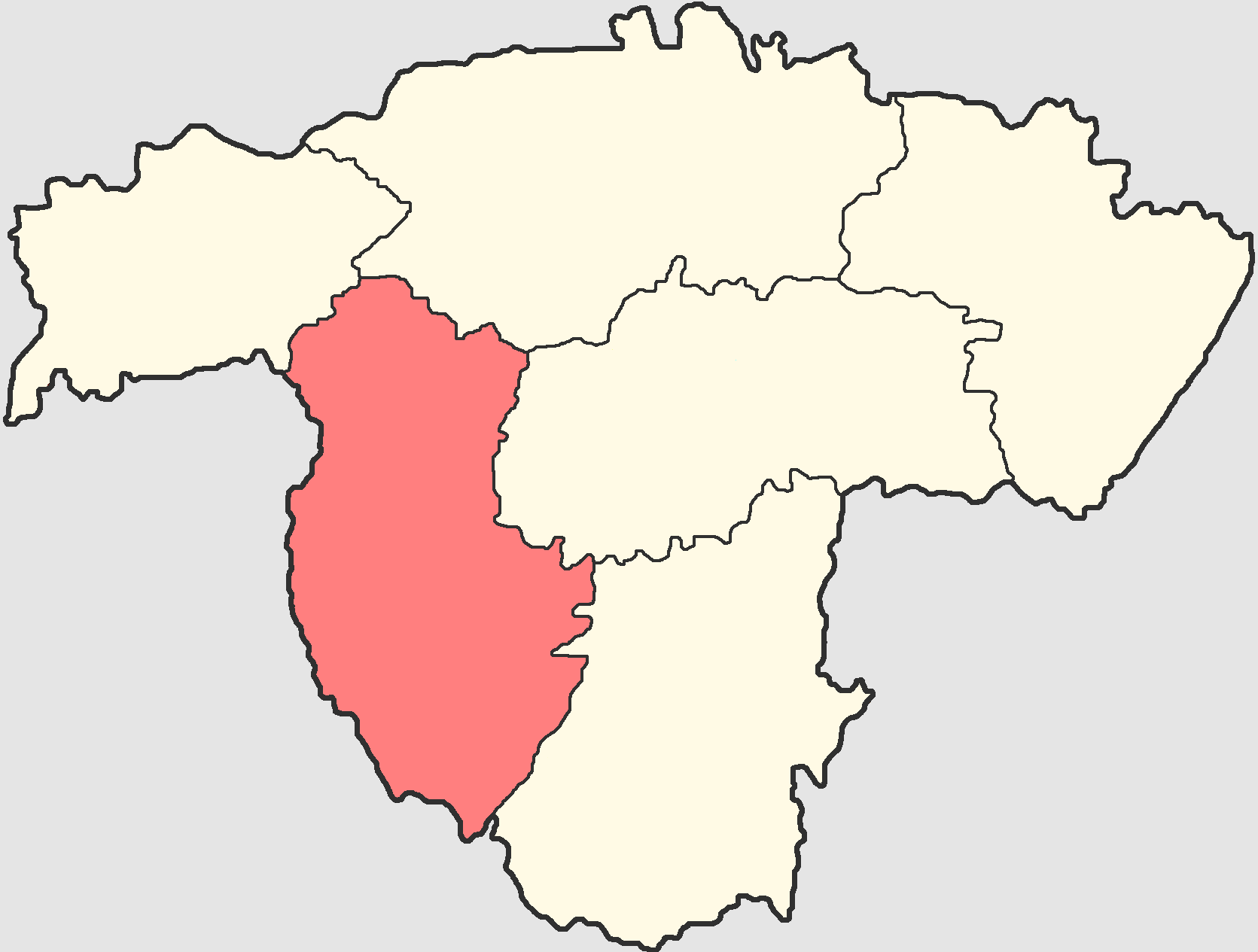
The subdivision within the Ufa Governorate

Belebeyevsky Uyezd (Белебеевский уезд) was one of the subdivisions of the Ufa Governorate of the Russian Empire. It was situated in the southwestern part of the governorate. Its administrative centre was Belebey.

== Demographics ==
At the time of the Russian Empire Census of 1897, Belebeyevsky Uyezd had a population of 433,179. Of these, 53.8% spoke Bashkir, 20.4% Russian, 13.5% Tatar, 7.3% Chuvash, 2.4% Mordvin, 1.7% Mari, 0.5% Ukrainian, 0.1% Udmurt, 0.1% Estonian and 0.1% German as their native language.
