= Lyubomudry =

Lyubomudry (Russian: любомудры) were the members of the secret circle "Society of Lyubomudriye" (Общество любомудрия) which existed in Russia in 1823-1825. Lyubomudriye was the Slavophile replacement term for "philosophy", i.e., the formal translations would be "Philosophers" and "The Society of Philosophy", respectively. The circle was interested in philosophy, aesthetics and literature. The members were of different political preferences, ranging from Decembrists to conservatives. The circle was disbanded after the suppression of the Decembrist revolt and its papers were burned.

== See also ==
- Secret society
