= Aleksey Khomyakov =

Russian philosopher (1804–1860)

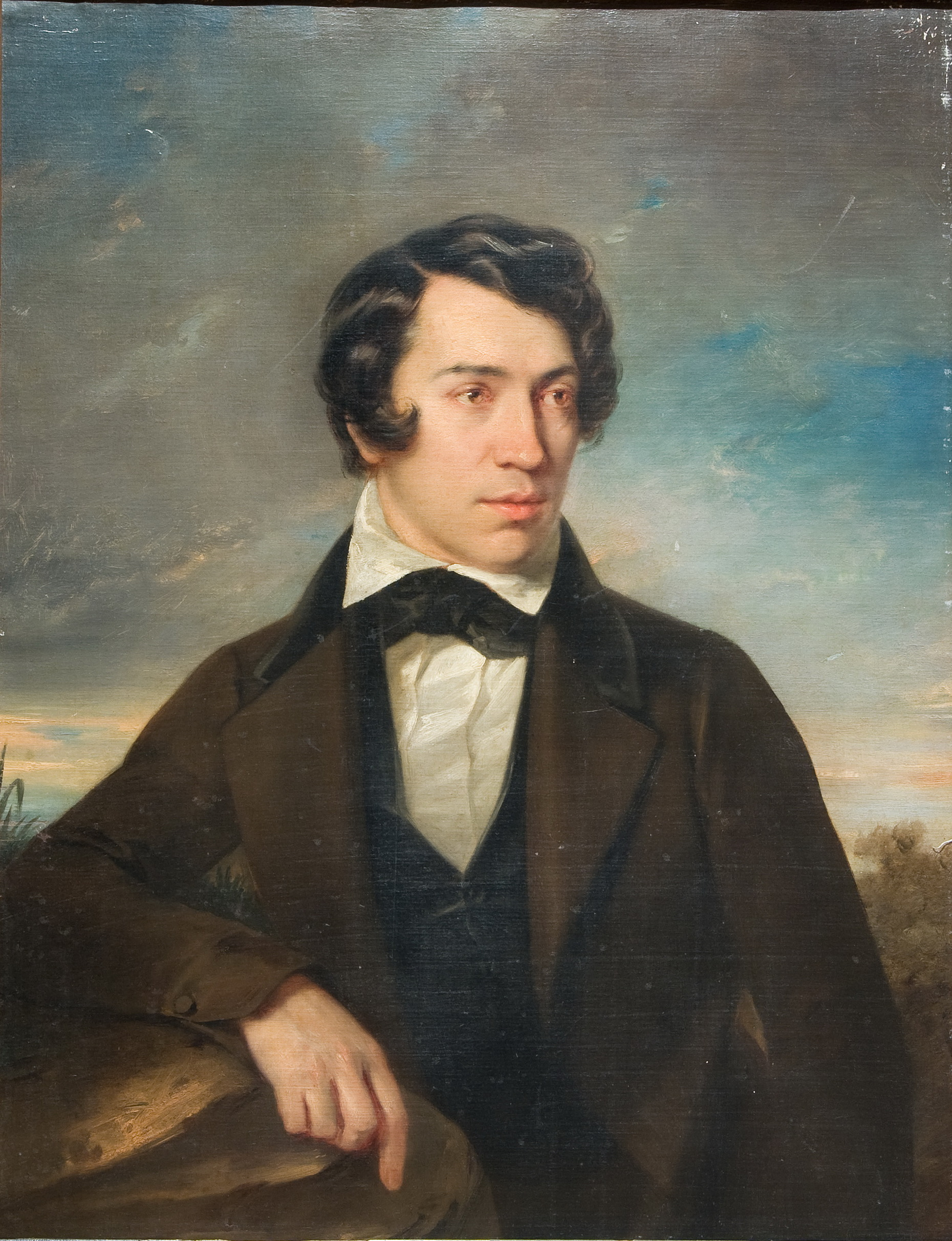
Self-portrait (1842)

Aleksey Stepanovich Khomyakov (Russian: Алексе́й Степа́нович Хомяко́в; 13 May [O.S. 1 May] 1804 – 5 October [O.S. 23 September] 1860) was a Russian theologian, philosopher, poet and amateur artist. He co-founded the Slavophile movement along with Ivan Kireyevsky, and he became one of its most distinguished theoreticians. His son Nikolay Khomyakov was a speaker of the State Duma.

== Biography ==
Khomyakov's whole life was centred on Moscow. He viewed this "thousand-domed city" as the epitome of the Russian way of life. Equally successful as a landlord and conversationalist, he published very little during his lifetime. His writings, printed posthumously by his friends and disciples, exerted a profound influence on the Russian Orthodox Church and Russian philosophers, such as Fyodor Dostoyevsky, Konstantin Pobedonostsev, and Vladimir Solovyov.

For Khomyakov, socialism and capitalism were equally repugnant offspring of Western decadence. The West failed to solve human spiritual problems, as it stressed competition at the expense of co-operation. In his own words, "Rome kept unity at the expense of freedom, while Protestants had freedom but lost unity".

Khomyakov's own ideals revolved around the term sobornost, the Slavonic equivalent of catholicity found in the Nicene Creed; it can be loosely translated as "togetherness" or "symphony". Khomyakov viewed the Russian obshchina as a perfect example of sobornost and extolled the Russian peasants for their humility.

Khomyakov died from cholera, infected by a peasant he had attempted to treat. He was buried next to his brother-in-law, Nikolai Yazykov, and another disciple, Nikolai Gogol, in the Danilov Monastery. The Soviets arranged for their disinterment and had them reburied at the new Novodevichy Cemetery.

== Later evaluation of work ==
The Russian religious philosopher Nikolai Berdyaev located Khomyakov's significance in his attempt to free Christianity from rationalism. As he wrote in his 1912 book, Aleksei Stepanovich Khomiakov:

Khomiakov will be eternally remembered, first and foremost, for his statement of the problem of the Church and his attempt to reveal the essence of the Church. Khomiakov approached the essence of the Church from within, not from outside. First of all he did not believe that it is possible to formulate a concept of the Church. The essence of the Church is inexpressible; like all living organisms, she cannot be encompassed by any formula, is not subject to any formal definitions. The Church is, first of all, a living organism, a unity of love, ineffable freedom, the truth of the faith not subject to rationalization. From the outside the Church is not knowable or definable; she is known only by those who are within her, by those who are her living members. The sin of scholastic theology was that it attempted to formulate rationalistically the essence of the Church; that is, it attempted to transform the Church from a mystery known only to believers into something subject to the knowledge of objective reason.

For Khomyakov, freedom must be "actualized in sobornost, not in individualism". However, sobornost is also a site of freedom:

It is difficult to find a freer sense of the Church. Nothing coerces Khomyakov. In his relation to the Church there is nothing from outside; all is from within. For him, life in the Church is life in freedom. Indeed, the Church is unity in love and freedom. The Church is not an institution and not an authority. The Church has nothing juridical, no rationalization. For Khomyakov, wherever one finds genuine love in Christ, freedom in Christ, unity in Christ, there one finds the Church. No formal characteristics define the essence of the Church. Even the universal councils are genuinely universal and therefore authoritative only because they are freely and lovingly sanctioned by the people of the Church. Free sobornost in love -- this is where one finds the true organism of the Church. This is a very bold conception of the Church, which must frighten official theologians. This conception may be alien to theological scholasticism, but it is close to the spirit of sacred tradition and the Holy Scripture. Khomyakov ascribes special significance to sacred tradition, since he sees the spirit of sobornost in it. For him the Holy Scripture is only an inner fact of the life of the Church, that is, it is grasped through sacred tradition.

Berdyaev's contemporary Pavel Florensky, also a renowned religious philosopher, was not so sanguine. In his 1916 pamphlet, Around Khomyakov, he accused Khomyakov of taking away the transcendent truth of Christianity by placing so much emphasis on human agreement. Florensky considers that to be immanentism, which ultimately veers into Protestantism:

Does not Khomyakov, a waterfall of ideas and themes, provoke many acute and troubling doubts?

The chief of this, of course, is the attribution of Protestantism to Khomyakov. For Khomyakov, the essence of Protestantism consists only in protest against Romanism, but with the fundamental premises and characteristic modes of thought of the latter preserved. But is that really the case? The development of Protestantism and its derivatives after Khomyakov has undeniably shown that Protestantism, as the chief expression of the culture of recent times, is based on humanism, the elevation of humanity, the divinization of humanity. To use a term borrowed from philosophy, Protestantism is based on immanentism, meaning humanity's intention to create all reality out of itself, outside of and apart from God, that is, out of nothing, and, first and foremost, sacred reality; to create this reality in all senses, beginning with the formation of concepts and ending with spiritual reality.

Meanwhile, the essence of Orthodoxy is ontologism -- "the reception of reality from God" as given, not as created by humanity. The essence of Orthodoxy is humility and gratitude. But what do we see in Khomyakov? ... Inquiring more attentively into Khomyakov's theories, we, to our sorrowful surprise, see the same spirit of immanentism that constitutes the essence of Protestantism, although in an immeasurably improved form -- chiefly through the introduction of the idea of sobornost (although the idea of the sobornost of consciousness is not completely foreign to Western philosophy, for instance, to Kant, not to mention Schelling of the final period, Feuerbach, Comte, and so on.)

...do not the very foundations of his opinion seem suspicious to an Orthodox believer when they are examined attentively? Whereas, for a man of the Church, the Church expresses the Truth -- for that is "the Holy Spirit's desire," and her task is to discover the truth abiding in God that is independent of her -- Khomyakov's theory of the Church leaves the impression that the decrees of the whole Church are true because they are the decrees of the whole Church. This word whole suggests that the decrees of the Church are not a discovery of the Truth but an invention of the Truth, as if the Truth were immanent to human reason, even if the latter is taken in its sobornost, and not transcendent to human reason and revealed to the latter from its transcendence. I have used the word impression. Yes, impression, for this sort of aim could not have distinctly arisen in Khomyakov's consciousness, and even less could he have expressed it. Khomyakov's thought tends to evade ontological determinacy, glistening before us in its play of mother-of-pearl. But this play of surface tones, brilliant but not substantial, and therefore changing their contours at the slightest turn of the head, does not yield a stable content of thought and leaves alarm and doubt in one's heart. Immanentism -- that is the flavor of Khomyakov's theories.

Nevertheless, Florensky is by no means dismissive of Khomyakov. He insists that "there is hardly any need to doubt the significance of Khomiakov the thinker and the nobility of his person. No one doubts his talents and intellect, nor the purity of his person and the selflessness of his intentions."

== Works ==
- Полное собранiе сочиненiй. Томъ I-VIII. Москва, 1900–1914.

== See also ==
- List of 19th-century Russian Slavophiles
- List of Russian philosophers
- Sobornost
