= Slavophilia =

Intellectual movement in Russia opposed to Western European influences

Slavophilia (Russian: славянофильство) was a movement originating from the 19th century that wanted the Russian Empire to be developed on the basis of values and institutions derived from Russia's early history. Slavophiles opposed the influences of Western Europe in Russia. Depending on the historical context, the opposite of Slavophilia could be seen as Slavophobia (a fear of Slavic culture) or also what some Russian intellectuals (such as Ivan Aksakov) called zapadnichestvo (westernism).

== History ==
Slavophilia, as an intellectual movement, was developed in 19th-century Russia. In a sense, there was not one but many Slavophile movements or many branches of the same movement. Some were left-wing and noted that progressive ideas such as democracy were intrinsic to the Russian experience, as proved by what they considered to be the rough democracy of medieval Novgorod. Some were right-wing and pointed to the centuries-old tradition of the autocratic tsar as being the essence of the Russian nature.

The Slavophiles were determined to protect what they believed were unique Russian traditions and culture. In doing so, they rejected individualism. The role of the Russian Orthodox Church was seen by them as more significant than the role of the state. Socialism was opposed by Slavophiles as an alien thought, and Russian mysticism was preferred over "Western rationalism". Rural life was praised by the movement, which opposed industrialization and urban development, and protection of the "mir" was seen as an important measure to prevent the growth of the working class.

The movement originated in Moscow in the 1830s. Drawing on the works of Greek Church Fathers, the philosopher Aleksey Khomyakov (1804–60) and his devoutly Orthodox colleagues elaborated a traditionalistic doctrine that claimed Russia has its own distinct way, which should avoid imitating "Western" institutions. The Russian Slavophiles criticised the modernisation of Peter the Great and Catherine the Great, and some of them even adopted traditional pre-Petrine dress.

Andrei Okara argues that the 19th-century classification of social thought into three groups, the Westernizers, the Slavophiles and the Conservatives, also fits well into the realities of the political and social situation in modern Russia. According to him, examples of modern-day Slavophiles include the Communist Party of the Russian Federation, Dmitry Rogozin and Sergei Glazyev.

== Doctrine ==
The doctrines of Aleksey Khomyakov, Ivan Kireyevsky (1806–1856), Konstantin Aksakov (1817–1860) and other Slavophiles had a deep impact on Russian culture, including the Russian Revival school of architecture, composers such as The Five (active in the 1850s and 1860s), the novelist Nikolai Gogol (1809–1852), the poet Fyodor Tyutchev (1803–1873) and the lexicographer Vladimir Dahl (1801–1872). Their struggle for purity of the Russian language had something in common with the ascetic views of Leo Tolstoy (1828–1910). The doctrine of sobornost, the term for organic unity and integration, was coined by Kireyevsky and Khomyakov. It was to underline the need for cooperation between people, at the expense of individualism, on the basis that opposing groups focus on what is common between them. According to Khomyakov, the Orthodox Church organically combines in itself the principles of freedom and unity, but the Catholic Church postulates unity without freedom, and in Protestantism, on the contrary, freedom exists without unity. In the Russian society of their time, the Slavophiles saw sobornost in ideal form in the peasant obshchina. The obshchina recognized the primacy of collectivity but guaranteed the integrity and the welfare of the individual within the collective.

In the sphere of practical politics, Slavophilism manifested itself as a pan-Slavic movement for the unification of all Slavic people under leadership of the Russian tsar and for the independence of the Balkan Slavs from Ottoman rule. The Russo-Turkish War of 1877-1878 is usually considered a high point of this militant Slavophilism, as expounded by the charismatic Russian military commander General Mikhail Skobelev. Russians' attitudes towards other nations with Slavic origins varied, depending on the group involved. Classical Slavophiles believed that "Slavdom", alleged by the Slavophile movement to grant a common identity to all people of Slavic origin, was based on Eastern Orthodox religion.

The Russian Empire, besides containing Russians, ruled over millions of other Slavs: Ukrainians, Poles and Belarusians, who had their own national identities, traditions and religions. Towards Ukrainians and Belarusians, the Slavophiles developed the view that they were part of the same "Great Russian" nation, Belarusians being called the "White Russians" and Ukrainians "Little Russians" or "Malorussians". Slavophile thinkers such as Mikhail Katkov (1818–1887) believed that both these nations should be ruled under Russian leadership and were an essential part of the Russian state. At the same time, they denied the separate cultural identity of Ukrainian and Belarusian people, believing that their national as well as linguistic and literary aspirations were a result of "Polish intrigue" to separate them from Russians. Other Slavophiles, like Ivan Aksakov, recognized the right of Ukrainians to use the Ukrainian language but saw it as completely unnecessary and harmful. Aksakov, however, did see some practical use for the "Malorussian" language: it would be beneficial in the struggle against the "Polish civilizational element in the western provinces".

Besides Ukrainians and Belarusians, the Russian Empire also included the Poles, Slavs whose country had disappeared in 1795 after three neighboring states, including Russia, partitioned its territory. In 1815 the decisions of the Congress of Vienna expanded Russian control into more Polish-inhabited areas, including Warsaw. Poles proved to be a problem for the ideology of Slavophilism. The very name "Slavophiles" indicated that the characteristics of the Slavs were based on their ethnicity, but at the same time, Slavophiles believed that Orthodoxy equaled Slavdom. This belief was belied by the very existence of Poles within the Russian Empire, who, while having Slavic origins, were also deeply Roman Catholic, with the Catholic faith forming one of the core values of Polish national identity. Also, while Slavophiles praised the leadership of Russia over other nations of Slavic origin, the Poles' very identity was based on Western European culture and values, and Poles saw resistance to Russia as resistance to something representing an alien way of life. As a result, Slavophiles were particularly hostile to the Polish nation, often emotionally attacking it in their writings.

When the Polish uprising of 1863 started, Slavophiles used anti-Polish sentiment to foster feelings of national unity in the Russian people, and the idea of the cultural union of all Slavs was abandoned. With that, Poland became firmly established to Slavophiles as a symbol of Catholicism and Western Europe, that they detested, and as Poles were never assimilated within the Russian Empire - constantly resisting Russian occupation of their country - in the end, Slavophiles came to concede that annexation of Poland was a mistake when they realised that the Polish nation could not be russified. "After the struggle with Poles, Slavophiles expressed their belief, that notwithstanding the goal of conquering Constantinople, the future conflict would be between the "Teutonic race" (Germans), and "Slavs", and the Slavophile movement turned to Germanophobia.

Most Slavophiles were liberals and ardently supported the emancipation of serfs, which finally took place in the emancipation reform of 1861. Press censorship, serfdom and capital punishment were viewed as baneful influences of Western Europe. Their political ideal was a parliamentary monarchy, as represented by the medieval Zemsky Sobors.

== After serfdom ==
After serfdom was abolished in Russia and the end of the January uprising in Congress Poland, new Slavophile thinkers appeared in the 1870s and 1880s, represented by scholars such as Nikolay Danilevsky, who expounded a view of history as circular, and Konstantin Leontiev.

Danilevsky promoted autocracy and imperialistic expansion as part of Russian national interest. Leontiev believed in a police state to prevent European influences from reaching Russia.

== Pochvennichestvo ==
Later writers Fyodor Dostoyevsky, Konstantin Leontyev, and Nikolay Danilevsky developed a peculiar conservative version of Slavophilism, Pochvennichestvo (from the Russian word for soil). The teaching, as articulated by Konstantin Pobedonostsev (Ober-Procurator of the Russian Orthodox Church), was adopted as the official tsarist ideology during the reigns of Alexander III and Nicholas II. Even after the Russian Revolution of 1917, it was further developed by the émigré religious philosophers like Ivan Ilyin (1883–1954).

Many Slavophiles influenced prominent Cold War thinkers such as George F. Kennan, instilling in them a love for the Russian Empire as opposed to the Soviet Union. That, in turn, influenced their foreign policy ideas, such as Kennan's belief that the revival of the Russian Orthodox Patriarchate, in 1943, would lead to the reform or overthrow of Joseph Stalin's rule.

== See also ==
- Pan-Slavism
- List of 19th-century Russian Slavophiles
- Slavophobia
- Russian philosophy
- Russification
- Romantic Nationalism
- Sarmatianism
