= Veselovsky (surname) =

Veselovsky (Russian: Веселовский, Ukrainian: Веселовський) is a surname. Notable people with the surname include:

- Alexander Veselovsky (1838–1906), Russian literary theorist
- Alexey Veselovsky (1843–1918), Russian literary historian and theorist, Alexander's brother
- Nikolay Veselovsky (1848–1918), Russian archaeologist
- Robert Veselovsky (born 1985), Slovak footballer

== See also ==
- Veselovsky (disambiguation)
- Veselovský
- Vesolovsky
