= Fyodor Kumanin =

Russian publisher and translator (1855–1896)

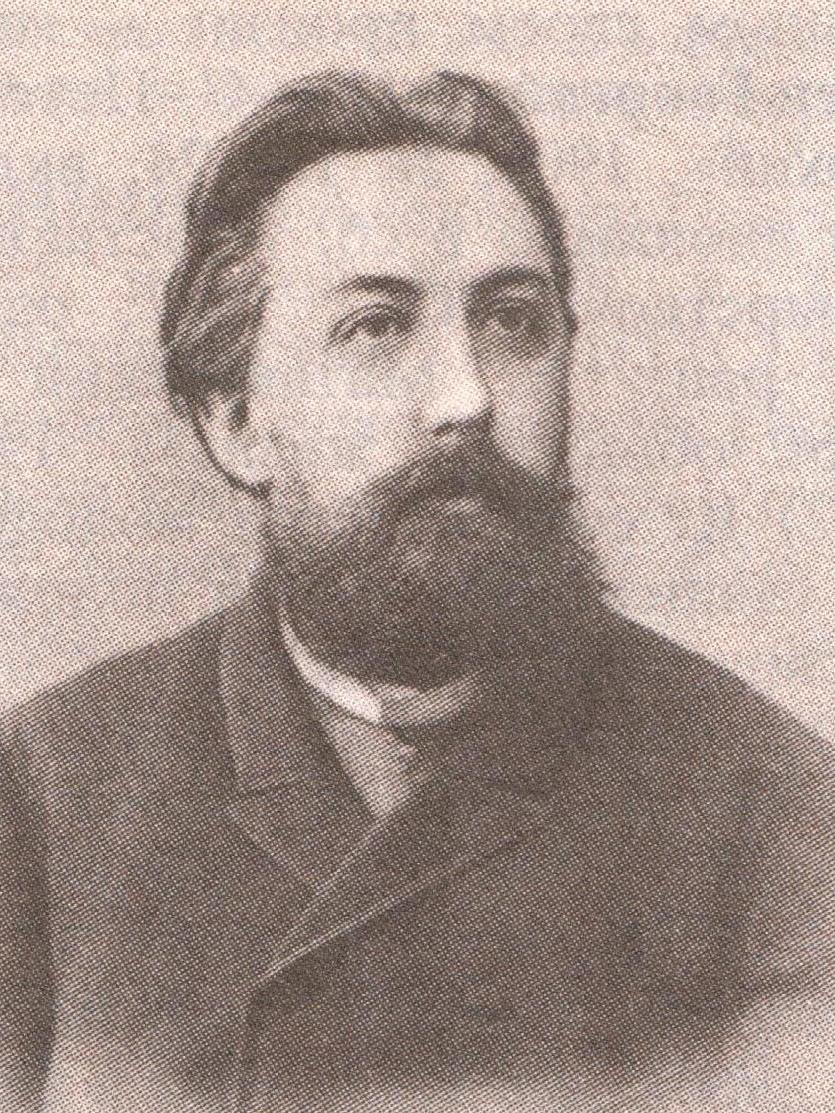
- Kumanin c. 1890
- Born: Fyodor Alexandrovich Kumanin; Фёдор Александрович Куманин; February 6, 1855; Moscow, Russian Empire
- Died: May 6, 1896 (aged 41); Moscow
- Occupations: publisher, editor, translator, critic

Fyodor Alexandrovich Kumanin (Russian: Фёдор Александрович Куманин, 6 February 1855, Moscow, Imperial Russia, — 6 May 1896, Moscow) was a publisher, theatre critic and translator from the Russian Empire.

He is best remembered as the founder, publisher and editor-in-chief of The Artist magazine (1889—1894) as well as the supplement to it, called Dnevnik Artista (Artist's Diary, 1891—1893). He launched three more journals, Teatral (Theatre-goer, 1895), Teatralnaya Biblioteka (Theatre Library, 1891—1895) and Chitatel (Reader, 1896), which he also edited and regularly published his own critical essays and reviews in.

Kumanin translated numerous foreign language plays. Four of them, by Hermann Sudermann (Sodoms Ende, Die Ehre Honour, Die Schmetterlingsschlacht and Das Gluck im Winkel) enjoyed long-lasting success on stage the Imperial as well as provincial Russian theatres. He co-authored, with the poet Olga Chyumina, one original play, a comedy called Zhorzhinka (Жоржинка).

According to the modern literary historian Irina Mustafina, Kumanin was "a rare type of a passionate zealot of culture" who's managed to launch a host of publications on theatre in the years when art journalism in Russia was in deep crisis. Ivan Shcheglov, though, had 'difficult' relationship with Kumanin, as well as Anton Chekhov. In January 1894 The Artist published Chekhov's novella The Black Monk, the occasion which resulted in a raw between Kumanin and the author. What exactly caused it remained unknown, although some evidence points at Chekhov's having accused the editor in violating his copyright, which outraged the latter. When Chekhov asked for galley proofs of the story, Kumanin refused to comply, in a rude manner. Later he made several attempts at restoring the relation with the Chekhov, who ignored his approaches.
