= Alexey Veselovsky =

Russian literary historian (1843–1918)

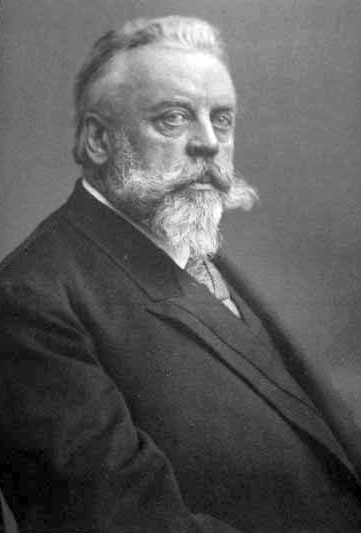
- Born: Alexey Nikolayevich Veselovsky; Алексей Николаевич Веселовский; 9 July 1843; Moscow, Russian Empire
- Died: 25 November 1918 (aged 75); Moscow, Soviet Russia
- Occupation: literary historian

{{

Alexey Nikolayevich Veselovsky (Russian: Алексей Николаевич Веселовский, 9 July 1843, Moscow, Russian Empire, – 25 November 1918, Moscow, Soviet Russia) was a Russian literary historian and theorist, critic, biographer and translator.

Best known for his in-depth researches on Moliere, Lord Byron and European theatre, he also authored the biographies of Alexander Griboyedov, Alexander Hertzen, Jonathan Swift, Denis Diderot and Pierre Beaumarchais, among others, contributing to Russky Vestnik, The Artist, Kievskaya Starina, Russkiye Vedomosti. In early 1870s he was closely associated with the Sergey Yuriev's Beseda, then Sankt-Peterburgskiye Vedomosti and later Nedelya, where for five years he edited the Foreign news section.

Veselovsky read Russian literature and language at Moscow University as well as Lazarev Institute of Oriental Languages, and in 1906 was elected an Honorary Member of the Saint Petersburg Academy of Sciences. In 1901-1904 he served as a chairman for the Society of the Followers of Russian Literature. Working in tandem with his wife Alexandra he translated three volumes of Greek History by Ernst Curtius, as well a large part of History of Rome by Theodor Mommsen and Dante's Life and Works by Franz Xaver von Wegele.

Alexander Veselovsky was his brother.
