= The Black Monk =

1894 novella by Anton Chekhov

- Short story by Anton Chekhov
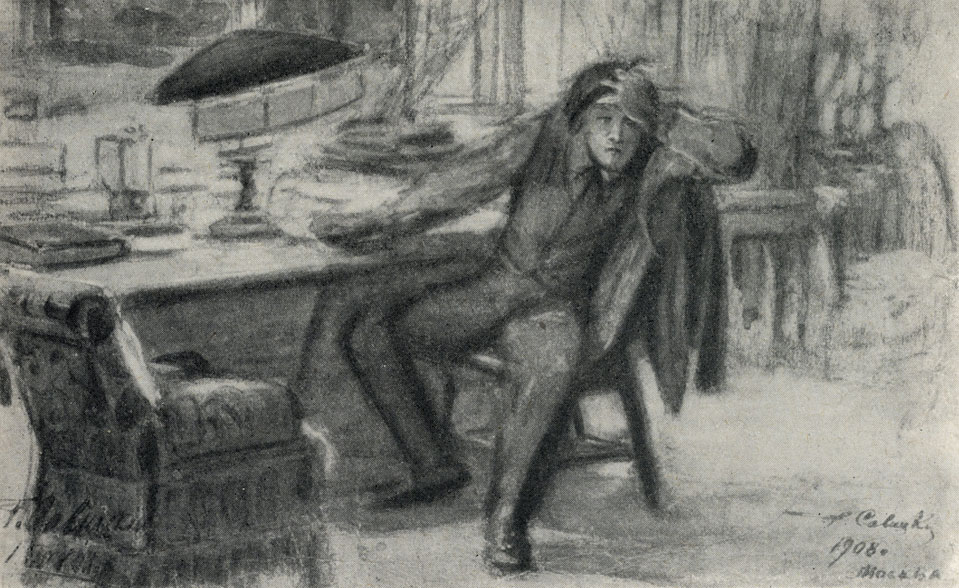
- 1908 illustration by G.K. Savitsky
- Original title: Чёрный монах
- Country: Russia
- Language: Russian

Publication
- Published in: The Artist
- Publisher: Adolf Marks (1901)
- Publication date: January 1894

"The Black Monk" (Russian: Чёрный монах, romanized: Chyorny monakh) is a novella by Anton Chekhov, written in 1893 while Chekhov was living in the village of Melikhovo. It was first published in 1894 in The Artist, one of the leading Russian magazines on theater and music in the last quarter of the 19th century. The story tells of the last two tragic years in the life of a fictitious scholar, Andrey Vasilyevich Kovrin.

== Publication ==
The story, divided into nine chapters and described by Chekhov as a "medical novella, historia morbi", portraying a "young man suffering from delusions of grandeur", was first published by The Artist (No 1, January 1894 issue). The same year it was included into the Novellas and Stories (Повести и рассказы) collection. Chekhov included it into the Volume VIII of his Collected Works, published in 1899–1901 by Adolf Marks. On 7 July 1898 R.E.C. Long approached Chekhov for the permission to translate several of his stories into English. The collection The Black Monk and Other Tales, which came out in Britain in 1903, became the first to introduce British readership to Chekhov's writings.

== Background ==
On 28 July 1893 Chekhov informed Alexey Suvorin in a letter that he'd just finished "a little novella, just a couple of quires". "Come to visit me here, and I'll give it for you to read", he added somewhat teasingly. Suvorin suggested that the story should be published in Novoye Vremya, but Chekhov declined the offer. Later, upon having read the story, Suvorin asked to what extent did it reflect the author's own mental condition. "When the writer depicts a sick person it does not mean he is sick himself... Just wanted to portray a man suffering from delusions of grandeur. The image of a monk riding in the fields came to me in a dream, and as I woke up I told about to Misha", Chekhov replied in the 25 January 1894 letter.

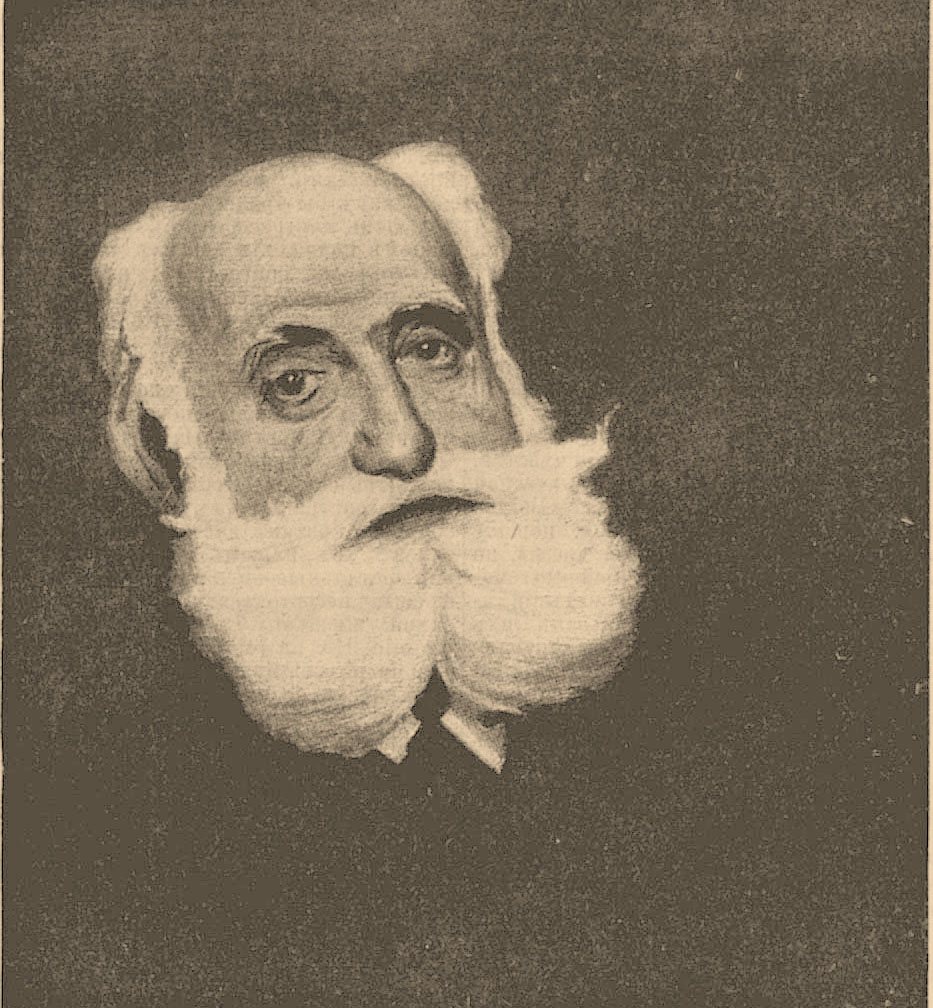
Chekhov discarded Max Nordau's ideas on the European intelligentsia's spiritual degeneration, but, perhaps inadvertently, quoted fragments from his 1892 book Degeneration at least twice in the story.

According to Mikhail Chekhov, the story in many ways reflected Chekhov's experience in Melikhovo. It was here that he became seriously engaged in gardening. "Early in the morning he would... come into the garden and carefully inspect each tree, each shrub, perhaps to some trimming, or just stare at it, inspecting something." Chekhov was often visited here by Ignaty Potapenko and Lika Mizinova. "Lika would sit at the grand piano and sing the then increasingly popular "Légende valaque" by Braga... a song in which a sick, delirious girl hears the angels singing and asks her mother to come to the balcony and tell her where these sounds might come from ... Anton Pavlovich liked this romance's mysticism and fine romanticism. I mention this because it was directly linked to the origins of the story The Black Monk," Mikhail Chekhov wrote.

Psychologically those were difficult days for Chekhov, who was suffering from anxiety and insomnia. "I would have eagerly flee to you in Petersburg, such are my moods, by cholera rages, twenty versts from here," he wrote Suvorin on 28 July 1883, complaining about "deadly longing for some loneliness" and "horrid psychopathic moods". "...I don't think that I suffer from some psychological ailment. It's just that the will to live seems to have left me, although I don't think it's any kind of sickness, perhaps something transitory and trivial," he wrote to Suvorin in January 1894.

According to Mikhail Chekhov, "in Melikhovo Anton Pavlovich's nerves got completely out of order due to overwork, and he almost lost sleep. Once he'd start to fall into drowsiness, some strange force would throw him up." It was during one such bad night that he had mental vision of a black monk. "It had the immense effect upon my brother, he won't be able to shake it off, returned to this monk in conversations from time to time and eventually wrote his well-known story about it."

This was also the time when Chekhov became deeply interested in psychiatry and became friends with doctor Vladimir Yakovenko, the founder and director of the best Russian psychiatric clinic of its time, in Meshcherskoye. "If you want to become a true writer, my darling, study psychiatry, this is quite necessary," he was assuring Shchepkina-Kupernik, "...in those days when he was writing The Black Monk", according to her 1928 memoirs.

In the summer of 1892 Max Nordau's book Degeneration was widely discussed in the Russian press. Chekhov thought little of Nordau's ideas, but it might have left some impression upon him, for at least twice the Black Monk in his speeches quotes fragments from the chapter called "Genius and Crowd".

== Plot ==
This story follows the character Andrey Kovrin, a Russian scholar who is seemingly brilliant. In the beginning of the story, Kovrin is overworked and his nerves are off. He is invited to take a break in the country at the home where he grew up. The place is gorgeous, with expansive gardens and orchards – it is the lifework of Yegor, his former guardian, who lives and works there with his daughter, Tanya. When Tanya and Kovrin were children, Yegor became Kovrin's carer when both his parents died. Both think very highly of Kovrin and are very excited about his arrival. Kovrin learns how much work it is to take care of the garden, and develops a deep appreciation for it. Then he starts seeing a black monk, whose appearance borders on the supernatural, and begins to question his sanity. The black monk convinces Kovrin that he is chosen by God for a special purpose – that he has the power to save mankind from millennia of suffering using his genius, and that his recent ill health is inevitable for someone making such noble sacrifices.

Yegor expresses to Kovrin that the only man he could trust to marry his daughter is Kovrin himself, convinced that any other man would take her away and his life's work would fall into ruin. They marry and, in time, Kovrin's wife notices his hallucinations, since he often converses with the black monk. She "cures" Kovrin over time, but he becomes convinced that without the black monk's "guidance", he is doomed to mediocrity instead of genius. He becomes bitter and antagonistic towards his loved ones, and eventually the couple splits up. His physical health deteriorating rapidly because of tuberculosis, he moves in with a woman who takes care of him. The story ends with Kovrin experiencing one final hallucination while he hemorrhages; the black monk guides him toward incorporeal genius and he dies with a smile.

=== Quotes ===
- "I exist in your imagination, and your imagination is part of nature, so I exist in nature." (The Black Monk)
- ["And what is the object of eternal life?" (Kovrin)]—"As of all life—enjoyment. True enjoyment lies in knowledge, and eternal life provides innumerable and inexhaustible sources of knowledge, and in that sense it has been said: 'In My Father's house there are many mansions.' " (The Black Monk)
- "My friend, healthy and normal people are only the common herd... Exaltation, enthusiasm, ecstasy—all that distinguishes prophets, poets, martyrs for the idea, from the common folk—is repellent to the animal side of man—that is, his physical health. I repeat, if you want to be healthy and normal, go to the common herd." (The Black Monk)
- "Why, why have you cured me? Preparations of bromide, idleness, hot baths, supervision, cowardly consternation at every mouthful, at every step—all this will reduce me at last to idiocy. I went out of my mind, I had megalomania; but then I was... interesting and original. Now I have become more sensible and stolid, but I am just like every one else: I am—mediocrity..." (Kovrin)

== Reception ==
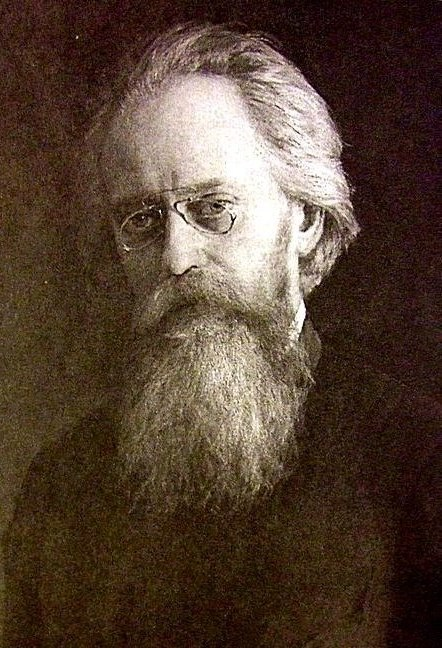
N.K. Mikhaylovsky was the first to recognise something much more than a mere psychiatry etude in "The Black Monk"

After the publication of "The Black Monk" several Chekhov's correspondents wrote to him to express delight and gratitude, among them journalist Mikhail Menshikov, children's writer (and the owner of the Babkino estate) Maria Kiselyova and Ivan Gorbunov-Posadov. "I've read your Black Monk and all but lost my mind myself," the clergyman Father Sergiy (S.A. Petrov) wrote to Chekhov on 8 May 1897. Gavrila Rusanov, Lev Tolstoy's friend and long-time correspondent, on 14 February informed Chekhov of how fond the latter was of the story ("It's wonder, just wonder!" he said). Yet, the contemporary critical reviews, which concentrated mostly on discussing technical details of the hero's madness, deeply dissatisfied Chekhov. The writer Sergey Semyonov who met Chekhov at the Posrednik Publisher's offices in late 1894, remembered: "A.P. was walking across the cabinet talking about the Black Monk's general idea and how it's been completely misunderstood."

"The Black Monk provides a deep and insightful depiction of a psychic ailment... The figures of the fanatical landlord-gardener and his over-sensitive, attractive daughter... are painted very expressively. The fatal misunderstanding between the sick and the healthy leads to horribly senseless tragedy," wrote Sergey Andreyevsky, reviewing 'the Novellas and Stories collection for Novoye Vremya. Alexander Skabichevsky (in Novosti i Birzhevaya Gazeta) too saw the story as nothing but a "rather curious description of the process of man going mad", from which "the reader cannot extract no conclusion, no idea". "This might have been unintentional, but it looks as if what Chekhov had meant here was that... strong aspirations and true noble passions are the province only of those prone to chasing spectral shadows," suggested D.M., the Russkiye Vedomosti reviewer. Yuri Govorukha-Otrok, labeling Kovrin as 'a new day Poprishchin', regarded the story as belonging to the 'fantastic' genre, and, as such, not an impressive effort.

Nikolai Mikhaylovsky in his 1900 article "Literature and Life. Some Things on Chekhov" argued that, far from being a mere psychiatric etude, The Black Monk was a serious statement, providing another sign of the author's changing his mindset. But he criticized Chekhov for being too untoward in expressing his own position as to Kovrin's dilemma. "Who is this Black Monk: a benevolent spirit consoling tired men with dreams and delusions about them being 'the chosen ones'... or, on the contrary, an evil genius who with vile flattery entices them into the world of madness, grief... and finally, death?" he poised the question.

V.Albov considered the story as a signifier for Chekhov's search for what he termed as the 'guiding idea'. "Only the lofty ideal makes life meaningful, gives it purpose, making it joyful and happy. This may be any dream you like, even madman's delirium, but it still is better than this depressing reality," he wrote in 1903. Fyodor Batyushkov seemed to support such view. "Now we begin to understand why Chekhov has always insisted upon the subjective, relativistic nature of all human norms; they are but steps for something high and distant, which our conscious mind can only guess at," he opined in his 1903 essay "About Chekhov".

Chekhov's French translator Jules Legras (Note: Jules Legras (1866—1938), a professor of philology at the Bordeaux University history, was originally a German literature historian, but then became deeply involved with Russian culture, history and literature. He visited Russia in 1892, worked together with Korolenko in the typhoid-stricken regions of Nizhny Novgorod, met Tolstoy and Chekhov and became the latter's translator. In his letters Chekhov addressed him rather touchingly, with patronymic, Yuliy Antonovich (Юлий Антонович).) thought such a plotline would suit rather a novel, than novella. "[Potentially] it amounts to a vast novel about a highly educated, nervously agitated Russian man," he wrote to Chekhov on 9 June 1895. Legras considered the story's second part to be more of a sketch, especially next to the 'well-painted' first one. To become a novelist, though, according to Legras, Checkov would need to "considerably change [his] maniere, stop being content with using these concise, finely chiseled phrases", to such great effect, "become more involved with what's going on", and "love the life" rather than remain its "cruel observer".

== Film adaptations ==
- Чёрный монах, a 1988 TV film adaptation by Ivan Dykhovichny (script by Sergei Solovyov), featuring Stanislav Lyubshin and Tatyana Drubich.
- The Black Monk, a feature-length fiction film (2017) by Marylou and Jerome Bongiorno, inspired by the Chekhov story. It depicts a filmmaker struggling with sanity who encounters a legendary monk and uncovers the meaning of life and a lost love.

== Stage adaptations ==
- The Black Monk, a 2003 adaptation of the story by playwright David Rabe.
- Le Moine noir, 2003_2005, Opera in 8 scenes with a libretto by Yves Hersant and music by Philippe Hersant.
- The Black Monk, a 2008 musical adaptation by Wendy Kesselman.

== Sources ==
- Petri Liukkonen. "Anton (Pavlovich) Chekhov". Books and Writers.
