= Maxa Nordau =

French painter (1897–1993)

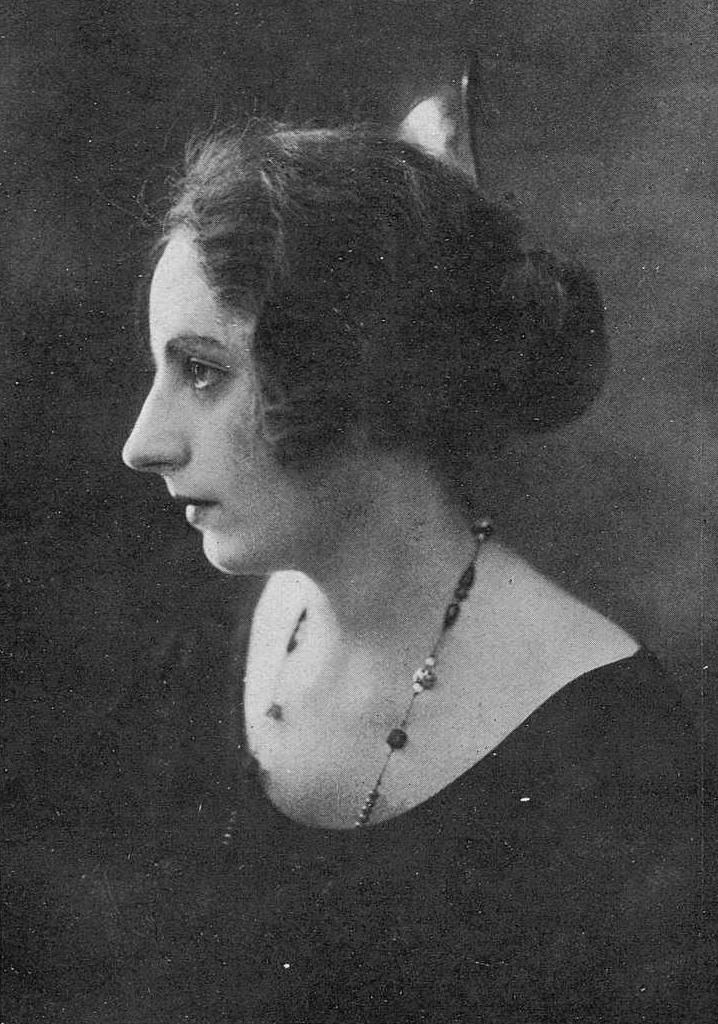
- Born: 10 January 1897
- Died: 17 September 1993 (aged 96)
- Other names: Maxa Nordau-Gruenblat
- Occupation: Painter

Maxa Nordau (Hebrew: נורדאו, מקסה, 10 January 1897 – 17 September 1993) was a French painter. She was from a Jewish family and was the daughter of Max Nordau, a prominent Zionist. She often travelled in the Middle East, and many of her paintings are portraits or nudes of Arab or Jewish women whom she met there.

== Life ==
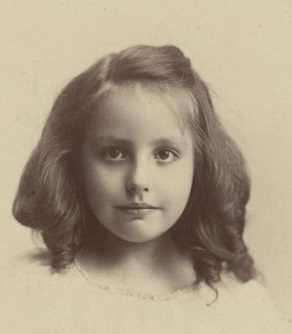
Nordau in 1903, aged six

She was born on 10 January 1897. Her parents were Max Nordau (1849–1923) and Anna Dons-Kaufmann. Her father was a doctor, born in Pest, Hungary, who was associated with Theodor Herzl in creating the state of Israel. In 1892 he wrote Degeneration, in which he violently attacked what he saw as the degenerate art and literature of the time. Her mother, Anna Dons-Kauffman, was a widow with four children when she married Nordau. Maxa grew up in a middle-class environment. Her father wrote a book of fairy tales for Maxa with carefully selected messages, which he published in 1905.

Maxa Nordau studied oil and watercolor painting under José María López Mezquita (1883–1954) and Jules Adler (1865–1952). She lived in Spain with her father during World War I (1914–18). She married Kalman (Claude) Gruenblat, and they had a child, Claudie Nordau-Gruenblat. Nordau's work was shown at official exhibitions included the 1924 Colonial Exhibition in Strasbourg. In the spring of 1926 she visited the United States for a lecture tour in the major cities and an art exhibit at The New Gallery in New York, hosted by the critic George S. Hellman. Ze'ev Jabotinsky, the Revisionist Zionist leader, sent a letter of greeting in which he wrote:

Your father’s spirit may be proud of his daughter not only in your loyalty but also in your own personality. You have inherited a great deal of that sober analytical sharpness, that humorous contempt of cant and ‘bunk,’ that clear perception of the main thing as distinct from sparkling or noisy trivialities, which were among your father’s charms; and you temper all this by a gentle feminine mentality. America will listen to Nordau’s message through the medium of an intelligent messenger.

Maxa Nordau became a member of the Société des femmes artistes modernes (FAM). This group held its inaugural exhibition in Paris in 1931. The Jewish members of FAM such as Nordau, Alice Halicka, Alice Hohermann and Rosette Idzkowski had to deal with growing anti-Semitism in the artistic scene during the 1930s, Évi Patai published an article on Nordau in the November 1936 issue of József Patai's Mult és Jövő (Budapest). Nordau helped decorate the Palestine pavilion for the Paris Exposition Internationale des Arts et Techniques dans la Vie Moderne of 1937 In 1939 her work was shown in an exhibition of French art in England.

During World War II (1939–45) Nordau exhibited in the US, including several exhibitions in New York City. She taught painting at the City College of New York. She collaborated with her mother in a life of her father, Max Nordau: A Biography, published in New York by the Nordau Committee in 1943. The work gives an intimate and loving portrait of the man, but not a detailed account of his career. The biography was translated by Ludwig Lewisohn, but Maxa Nordau was critical of it and the Morgen Journal refused payment. After the war Maxa Nordau returned to Paris. She continued to paint and exhibit in various private galleries, and to travel widely in Palestine, Egypt, Syria, Morocco, Turkey and Greece. She considered Israel her homeland. Nordau died on 17 September 1993.

== Work ==
The bulk of Nordau's work consists of portraits, mostly of women. They include vivid and colourful depictions of Arab women whom she met during her frequent visits to the Middle East. Although she was French, she is considered to be part of the School of Paris, a group of mostly non-French artists. She was influenced by her father's Zionist views but did not share his rejection of modernism. More than other women artists of the day she did not feel a need to represent bourgeois French values of femininity and domesticity. She often exhibited very naturalistic paintings of nude female Yemenite and Palestinian models whom she met and studied during visits to the Middle East. She also made portraits of pioneer Jewish women in Palestine and other Middle Eastern countries. She painted male and female Jewish settlers working the land in Palestine, and idealized desert landscapes. She exhibited in Paris in the Salon d'Automne, Salon des Independants, Salon Société Coloniale Nouveau, Galerie Zivy, Galerie Simonson and Galerie Carmine and others.

== Publications ==
Nordau illustrated several books. Publications include:

- Nordau, Max (1929), Contes pour Maxa, illustrated in colour by Maxa Nordau, Parispublisher=Kra, p. 270
- Nordau, Anna; Nordau, Maxa (1948), Max Nordau : l'homme, le penseur, le sioniste, preface by Pierre Paraf, Paris impr. Réaumur: Editions de "la Terre retrouvée", p. 320
- Zisman, Tania (1961), Lider / Poèmes, illustrated by Dawid Garfinkel and Maxa Nordau, Paris: Druqeray Wog / Imprimerie Vogue, p. 111
- Créange, Pierre (1993), Choix de poèmes / Pierre Créange, Collection Caractères; 513, illustrated by Maxa Nordau, Paris: Éd. Caractères, p. 127, ISBN 2-85446-071-5

== Sources ==
- Birnbaum, Paula (2011), Women Artists in Interwar France: Framing Femininities, Ashgate Publishing, Ltd., ISBN 978-0-7546-6978-4
- Grinblat, Mayana Ruth, "Maxa Nordau-Gruenblat", geni
- Gillum, K. Fred (2014-03-05), "Max Nordau", in Frank N. Magill (ed.), The 20th Century Go-N: Dictionary of World Biography, Routledge, ISBN 978-1-317-74060-5
- Jewish Affairs, South African Jewish Board of Deputies, 1964
- Maxa Nordau (1897-1991) (in French), BnF: Bibliotheque nationale de France
- Maxa Nordau Gives First Lecture in New York, JTA: Jewish Telegraphic Agency, 24 February 1926
- Melnick, Ralph (1998), The Life and Work of Ludwig Lewisohn: This dark and desperate age, Wayne State University Press, ISBN 0-8143-2765-6
- Murphy, Melanie A. (2007), Max Nordau's Fin-de-siècle Romance of Race, Peter Lang, ISBN 978-0-8204-4185-6
- Nieszawer, Nadine; Princ, Déborah (2015), Jewish Artists of the School of Paris 1905-1939, Somogy éditions
- NORDAU, Maxa, Shapero Rare Books
- Patai, Raphael (2000), Between Budapest and Jerusalem: The Patai Letters, 1933-1938, Lexington Books, ISBN 978-0-7391-0211-4
- Volkov, Shulamit (2006-07-24), Germans, Jews, and Antisemites: Trials in Emancipation, Cambridge University Press, ISBN 978-1-139-45811-5
