= Entartete =

Entartete may refer to:

- Entartete Kunst — degenerate art
- Entartete Musik — degenerate music
- an infamous exhibition of art the Nazis deemed "degenerate"
- Art looted by the Nazis during World War II
- the decadent movement, much of the art of which would be labeled entartet by the Nazis
- Degeneration (Entartung) by Max Nordau (1892)
