= Shcheglov =

Shcheglov (Russian: Щеглов, from щегол meaning goldfinch) is a Russian masculine surname, its feminine counterpart is Shcheglova. It may refer to:

- Ivan Shcheglov (1855–1911), Russian writer
- Ivan Chtcheglov (1933–98), French political theorist
- Lev Shcheglov (1946–2020), Russian sexologist
- Elena Shcheglova (born 1950), Russian figure skater
- Nikolai Shcheglov (born 1960), Russian politician
- Sergei Shcheglov (born 1976), Ukrainian football player

== See also ==
- 2377 Shcheglov, a main-belt asteroid
