= Vesyolovsky =

Vesyolovsky/Veselovsky (masculine), Vesyolovskaya/Veselovskaya (feminine), or Vesyolovskoye/Veselovskoye (neuter) may refer to:

- Vesyolovsky District, a district of Rostov Oblast, Russia
- Veselovsky (rural locality) (Veselovskaya, Veselovskoye), name of several rural localities in Russia
- Veselovsky (surname) (Veselovskaya)
