= Vasily Skalon =

Russian economist, journalist and political activist (1846–1907)

- Василий Юрьевич Скалон
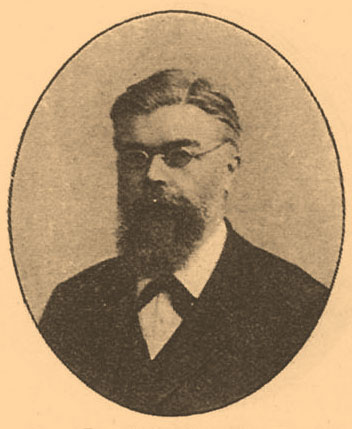
- Born: Vasily Yurievich Skalon; 19 February 1846; Perm Governorate, Russian Empire
- Died: 2 May 1907 (aged 61); Saint Petersburg, Russian Empire
- Occupations: writer, essayist, journalist, editor, politician

Vasily Yurievich Skalon (Russian: Васи́лий Ю́рьевич Скало́н, 7 February 1846 – 19 April 1907) was a Russian writer, essayist, journalist, editor and later in life, political activist.

A major authority on the history and the current problems of Russian zemstvo, Skalon published a set of influential essays on the matter, mostly in Russkaya Letopis, Russkiye Vedomosti and Vestnik Evropy. His series of articles for Alyabyev's Gramotei magazine came out as a book in 1872 only to be banned and later destroyed by the special order of the Ministry of Finance. A compilation Questions of Zemstvo. Sketches and Reviews came out as a separate edition in 1882. Skalon edited the magazines Zemstvo (1880–1882, with Alexander Koshelev) and, in 1886–1888, The Works of the Free Economic Society (Труды вольного экономического общества). In early 1900s he moved into politics and became a member of first the Union of Liberation and later the Russian Constitutional Democratic Party.
