= Andrey Sirotinin =

Russian writer (1864–1922)

- Born: Andrey Nikolayevich Sirotinin; Андрей Николаевич Сиротинин; 1864; Dyatkovo, Oryol Governorate, Imperial Russia
- Died: 1922 (aged 57–58); Saratov, Soviet Russia
- Occupations: philologist, translator, educator
- Years active: 1880s-1922

Andrey Nikolayevich Sirotinin (Russian: Андрей Николаевич Сиротинин, 1864, Dyatkovo, Bryansk region, Oryol Governorate, Imperial Russia, — 1922, Saratov, Soviet Russia) was a Russian philologist, poet, translator, educator and theatre historian.

A Moscow University alumnus, he read Latin at the Petrovskaya gymnasium, later (in 1903-1915) Russian language and literature in Warsaw gymnasiums, and, in 1920-1922, at Saratov University. Sirotinin translated from Greek and Latin The Poems by Theocritus (1890) and Phormio by Terence (1900), then switched to the Western Slavic poetry. He is considered to be the best Russian translator from Sorbian and Kashubian languages. His book of translated as well as original poetry S Rodnykh Poley (From Native Fields, 1916) also featured extensive theoretical essays. Sirotinin authored several biographies, notably of Kondraty Ryleyev (1890, Russky Arkhiv), later complemented by Ryleyev and Nemtsevich (Russky Arkhiv, 1898), as well as the books Conversations on Russian Literature (Беседы о русской словесности, 1909, 1910, 1913), Russia and the Slavs (Россия и славяне, 1913), Czech Grammar and Reader and How to Learn the Czech Language (both 1910, published in Warsaw). His series of essays on the history of Russian theatre (Очерк развития русского сценического искусства) appeared in the Artist magazine in 1891-1893.

Andrey Sirotinin died of cholera in Saratov in 1922.
