= Fyodor Buslaev =

Russian writer (1818–1898)

Fedor Ivanovich Buslaev
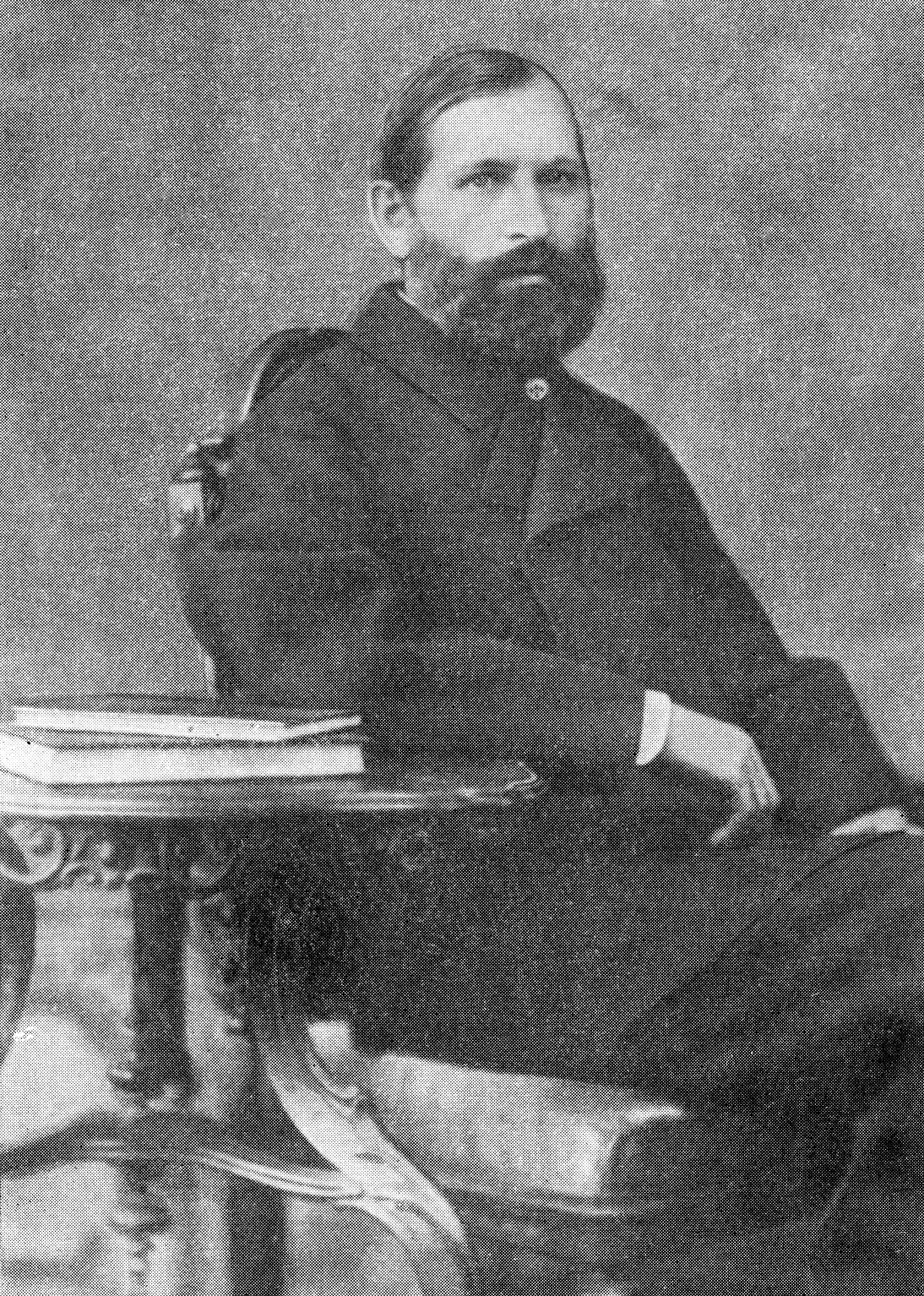
- Born: April 25, 1818; Kerensk, Penza Governorate, Russian Empire
- Died: August 12, 1898 (aged 80); Moscow, Moscow Governorate, Russian Empire
- Occupations: philologist, art historian, folklorist
- Known for: Mythological school of comparative literature

Academic background
- Education: Doctor of Science (1861, 1889); Academician of the Russian Academy of Sciences
- Alma mater: Imperial Moscow University (1838)

Fedor Ivanovich Buslaev (Russian: Фёдор Иванович Буслаев; April 25, 1818 – August 12, 1898) was a Russian philologist, art historian, and folklorist who represented the Mythological school of comparative literature and linguistics. He was profoundly influenced by Jacob Grimm and Theodor Benfey.

== Biography ==
Buslaev was educated at Penza and Moscow University. At the end of his academic course, 1838, he accompanied the family of Count S.G. Stroganov on a tour through Italy, Germany and France, occupying himself principally with the study of classical antiquities. On his return he was appointed assistant professor of Russian literature at the University of Moscow.

A study of Jacob Grimm's great dictionary had already directed the attention of the young professor to the historical development of the Russian language, and the fruit of his studies was the book On the Teaching of the National Language (Moscow, 1844 and 1867), which even now has its value. In 1848 he produced his work On the Influence of Christianity on the Slavonic Language, which was considered a milestone in the study of the development of the Slavonic languages.

In this work Buslaev proves that long before the age of Cyril and Methodius the Slavonic languages had been subject to Christian influences. In 1855 he published Palaeographical and Philological Materials for the History of the Slavonic Alphabets, and in 1858 Essay Towards an Historical Grammar of the Russian Tongue, abounding with rich material for students, carefully collected from an immense quantity of ancient records and monuments. In close connection with this work in his Historical Chrestomathy of the Church-Slavonic and Old Russian Tongues (Moscow, 1861). He was elected a member of the St. Petersburg Academy of Sciences in 1860.

Buslaev also interested himself in Russian popular poetry and old Russian art, and the result of his labors is enshrined in Historical Sketches of Russian Folk Literature and Art (St. Petersburg, 1861), a very valuable collection of articles and monographs, in which the author shows himself a worthy and faithful disciple of Grimm. His Folk Poetry (St. Petersburg, 1887) is a valuable supplement to the Sketches. In 1881 he was appointed professor of Russian literature at Moscow, and three years later published his Annotated Apocalypse with an atlas of 400 plates, illustrative of ancient Russian art.

In his advanced age Buslaev was to a large degree incapacitated by blindness and passed his time in dictating his memoirs to a secretary. Buslaev's work in the field of comparative literature was continued by his numerous students, notably Alexander Veselovsky.

== Works ==
- Историческая хрестоматия церковнославянского и древнерусского языков [Historical Chrestomathy of the Church Slavonic and Old Russian Languages] (in Russian). Moscow: Университетская типография. 1861. HTML transcription (2020).

== Bibliography ==
- Imperial Moscow University: 1755-1917: encyclopedic dictionary. Moscow: Russian political encyclopedia (ROSSPEN). 2010. pp. 106–108. ISBN 978-5-8243-1429-8 – via A. Andreev, D. Tsygankov.
