= Dr. Max Nordau Synagogue =

Conservative synagogue in Buenos Aires, Argentina

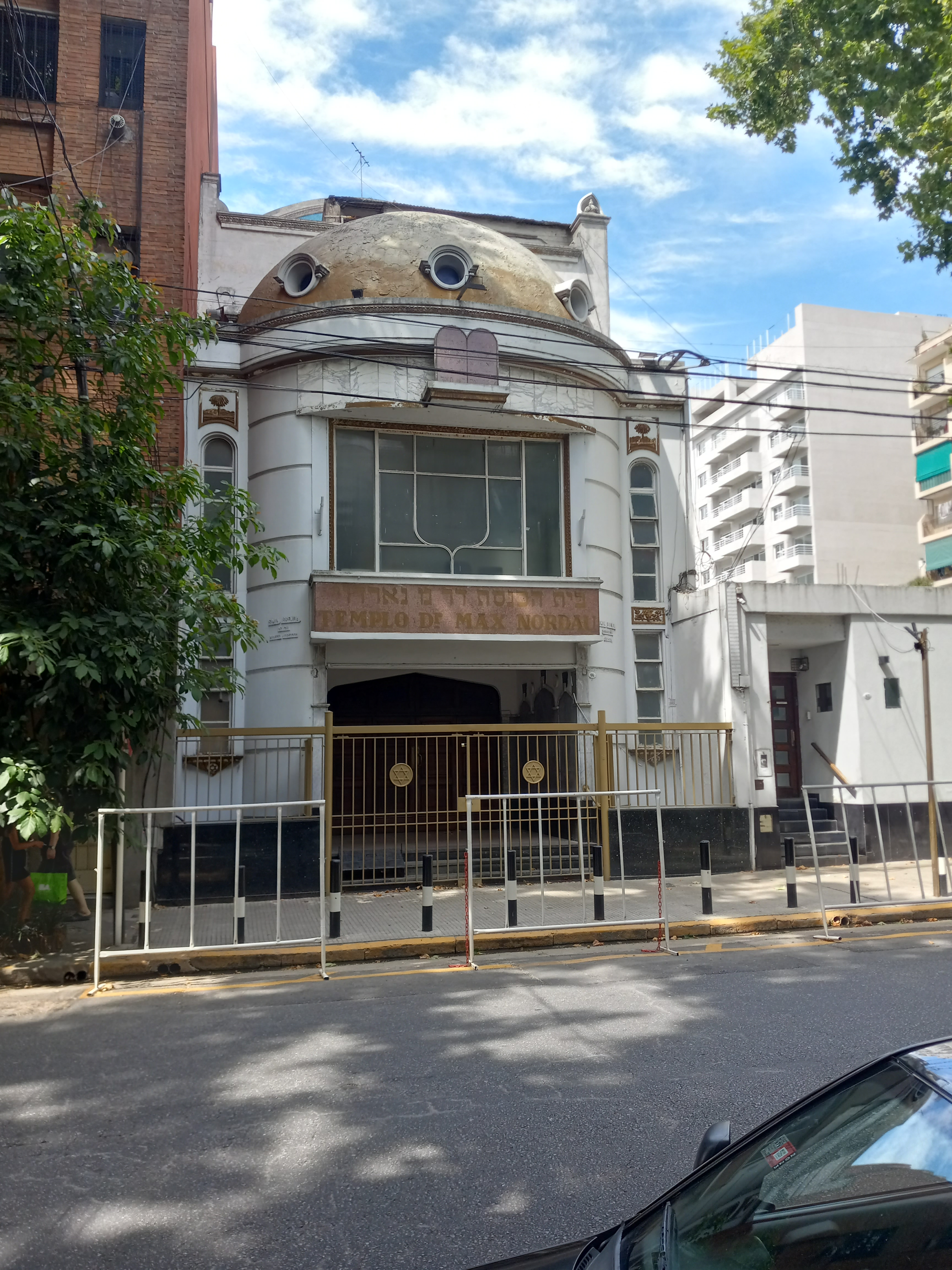
- The synagogue in 2023

- Location of the synagogue in Buenos Aires

Religion
- Affiliation: Conservative Judaism
- Rite: Nusach Ashkenaz
- Ecclesiastical or organizational status: Synagogue
- Status: Active

Location
- Location: Murillo 665, Villa Crespo, Buenos Aires
- Country: Argentina
- Interactive map of Dr. Max Nordau Synagogue
- Coordinates: 34°36′3.2″S 58°26′35.6″W

Architecture
- Established: 1912 (as a congregation)
- Completed: 1923 (first synagogue); 1955 (current structure)

The Dr. Max Nordau Synagogue, also called the Hebrew Community Dor Jadash (Hebrew: דור חדש, romanized: Dor Hadash, lit. 'New Generation'), is a Conservative Jewish congregation and synagogue, located at Murillo 665, in Villa Crespo, Buenos Aires, in Argentina.

== History ==
The congregation was established in 1912, when a group of European Jews, among them Lithuanians, Russians, and Poles. They founded a cultural center, near the place where is now the Dr. Max Nordau Synagogue.

The community moved to its current location in 1923 and constructed a synagogue and a cheder school, with 20 students and a teacher. That same year, the congregation changed its name to "Doctor Max Nordau Hebrew Association", named after the Zionist leader and follower of Theodor Herzl. The current temple was opened in 1955.

In 1985, the congregation was renamed Dor Jadash.

== See also ==
- History of the Jews in Argentina
- List of synagogues in Argentina
