= Alexander Koshelev =

Russian journalist, publicist, publisher and state official

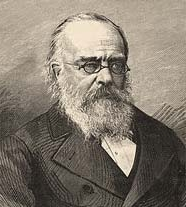
- Born: Александр Иванович Кошелев; 21 May 1806; Moscow, Russian Empire
- Died: 24 November 1883 (aged 77); Moscow, Russian Empire
- Occupations: journalist, publicist, publisher, state official

Alexander Ivanovich Koshelev (Russian: Александр Иванович Кошелев; 21 May 1806 – 24 November 1883) was a Russian journalist, publicist, publisher and state official.

A staunch Slavophile, Koshelev published numerous essays, mostly on economics. In the late 1850s he authored one of the several alternative land reform projects which the Russian government had to consider before embarking upon the Emancipation reform of 1861.

In 1856 Koshelev started publishing the magazine Russkaya Beseda and two years later became its editor. Later, he published the Moscow journals Beseda (1871–1872, edited by Sergey Yuriev) and (in 1880–1882) Zemstvo (edited by Vasily Skalon), both projecting the Slavophile views upon the agricultural issues and supporting the concept of obshchina as a true foundation for the Russian rural community.

Koshelev worked for several governmental offices, in the Moscow and Ryazan Governorates, but also in Poland (then part of the Russian Empire), specializing in finances, bank systems and economics. He was the President of the Moscow Agricultural Society and was regularly (in 1863–1865; 1869–1872; 1873–1876; 1881–1884) elected a glasnyy for the Moscow City Duma.

Koshelev's memoirs came out posthumously in Berlin, his widow Olga Fyodorovna being wary of the possibility of the Russian censors mangling the text.
