= Veselovský =

Veselovský (feminine Veselovská) is a Czech and Slovak surname. Notable people with the surname include:

- Martin Veselovský (born 1972), Czech journalist and TV host
- Peter Veselovský (1964–2025), Slovak ice hockey player
- Róbert Veselovský (born 1985), Slovak footballer
- Zdeněk Veselovský (1928–2006), Czech zoologist

== See also ==
- Veselovsky (disambiguation)
