= The Artist (Russian magazine) =

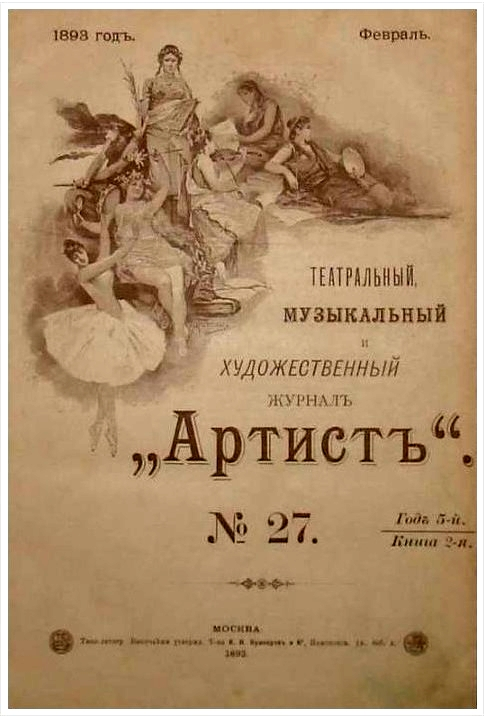
- Issue No. 27, February 1893
- Editor: Fyodor Kumanin
- Frequency: monthly, 7 issues a year
- First issue: 1889
- Final issue: 1895
- Based in: Moscow, Russian Empire
- Language: Russian

The Artist (Russian: ″Артистъ″) was an illustrated Russian magazine on theatre, music, literature and fine arts published in Moscow in 1889-1895. It was published monthly, but only during the theatre season, from September until April. The playwright, translator and theatre critic Fyodor Kumanin was the journal's founder, publisher and originally its editor (N.N. Novikov held the post in 1894-1895). Another important figure instrumental with the launch of this publication, one of the largest theatrical publications in Russia, was Sergey Yuriev.

In 1891 the magazine started to publish two supplements, Dnevnik Artista (Artist's Diary) and Teatralnaya Biblioteka (Theatre Library, continued until 1898).

Among the authors who contributed to the magazine regularly were professors Nikolai Storozhenko, Alexey Veselovsky, Nikolai Tikhonravov, dramatists and journalists Anton Chekhov, Vladimir Korolenko, Nestor Kotlyarevsky, Alexander Yuzhin, Alexey Pleshcheyev, Pyotr Boborykin, Kazimir Barantsevich, Vladimir Nemirovich-Danchenko, Nikolai Leskov, Viktor Goltsev, Ippolit Shpazhinsky, Andrey Sirotinin, composers Pyotr Chaykovsky, César Cui, Eduard Napravnik, Nikolai Rimsky-Korsakov, artists Abram Arkhipov, Sergei Vinogradov, Nikolai Klodt, Mikhail Nesterov, Vasily Polenov, Ilya Repin, Konstantin Trutovsky, actors Prov Sadovsky and Alexander Lensky.

The magazine strongly supported The Mighty Handful as well as The Society of Art and Literature formed by Konstantin Stanislavski, Fyodor Komissarzhevsky, Aleksandr Fedotov and Fyodor Sollogub in 1888.
