= Nikolay I. Storozhenko =

Russian literary historian

Nikolai Ilyich Storozhenko
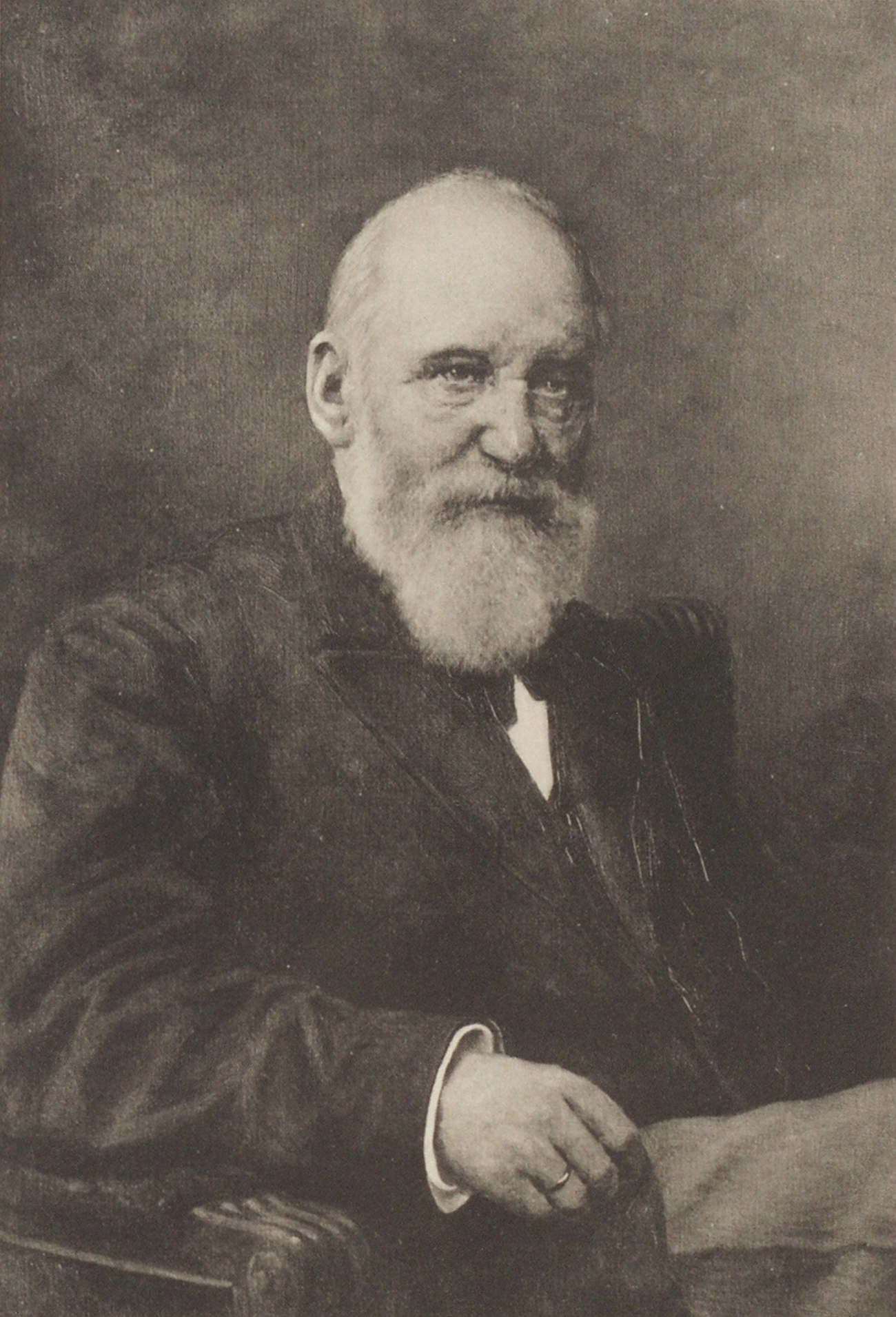
- Born: Николай Ильич Стороженко; May 22, 1836; Irzhavets, Chernigov Governorate, Ukraine/Russian Empire
- Died: January 25, 1906 (aged 69); Moscow, Russian Empire
- Education: Imperial Moscow University (1860)
- Occupations: literary historian, playwright

Nikolai Ilyich Storozhenko (Russian: Николай Ильич Стороженко; 22 May 1836 in Irzhavets, Chernigov Governorate, Russian Empire – 25 January 1906 in Moscow, Russian Empire) was a Russian literary historian and a leading Shakespearean scholar of his time.

A Moscow University graduate who in 1863 became the head of the newly established literary faculty there, Storozhenko is credited with being the first to start "teaching the history of literature on the scientific basis" and "imbue his lectures with the same literary talent and fine artistic taste which marked his besk known works" (according to Brockhaus & Efron). His 1878 doctorate "Robert Greene. His Life and Works" was translated into English by Edward Arthur Brayley Hodgetts and received good reviews in Britain. On the strength of it Storozhenko was elected a vice-president of the New Shakespeare Society.

Storozhenko compiled and edited the compilations Spanish Historical Literature and Victor Hugo and His Time. In 1894-1901 he was the head of the Russian Literary Society.

He initiated the inception of and was for several years an active contributor to The Artist magazine. In 1896 his play Three Wives' Man (Троеженец) was produced at Moscow's Maly Theatre.
