= Beseda (Russian magazine) =

Russian literary and political magazine

- Editor: Sergey Yuriev
- Categories: Literary magazine
- Frequency: Monthly
- Founded: 1871
- Final issue: 1872
- Based in: Saint Petersburg, Russian Empire
- Language: Russian

Beseda (Russian: Беседа, Conversation) was a Russian literary and political magazine founded in Saint Petersburg, Russian Empire, in 1871 by Alexander Koshelev and edited by Sergey Yuriev. The former's idea was follow the blueprint provided by his previous project, Russkaya Beseda, but Yuriev from the start started to build up a diverse team of contributors, while still being loyal to the original Panslavic doctrine.

Among the authors who regularly contributed to the magazine, were Tertiy Fillipov, Fyodor Bredikhin, Anton Budilovich, Marin Drinov, Mykola Kostomarov, Aleksandr Gradovsky, Sergey Solovyov, Orest Miller, Nikolai Aksakov, Nikolai Solovyov. Beseda published the novels In the Whirlpool by Alexey Pisemsky, The Bogatyrs by Nikolai Chayev, and several novellas by Grigory Potanin as well as poetry by Alexey Pleshcheyev, Fyodor Miller, Yakov Polonsky and A.K. Tolstoy, among others.

During the second year of its existence, the magazine started to have troubles with censorship. Its September 1872 issue was destroyed and later re-issued with the offending items extracted. Later that year Koshelev declared that he was stopping the publication temporarily, but never restarted it.
