= Veselovsky (rural locality) =

Set index of articles associated with the same name

Veselovsky (Russian: Веселовский; masculine), Veselovskaya (Веселовская; feminine), or Veselovskoye (Веселовское; neuter) is the name of several rural localities in Russia:

- Veselovsky, Orenburg Oblast, a settlement in Veselovsky Selsoviet of Yasnensky District of Orenburg Oblast
- Veselovsky, Rostov Oblast, a khutor in Kuteynikovskoye Rural Settlement of Chertkovsky District of Rostov Oblast
- Veselovskoye, a selo in Krasnozyorsky District of Novosibirsk Oblast
