= Max Nordau =

Zionist leader, physician, author, and social critic (1849–1923)

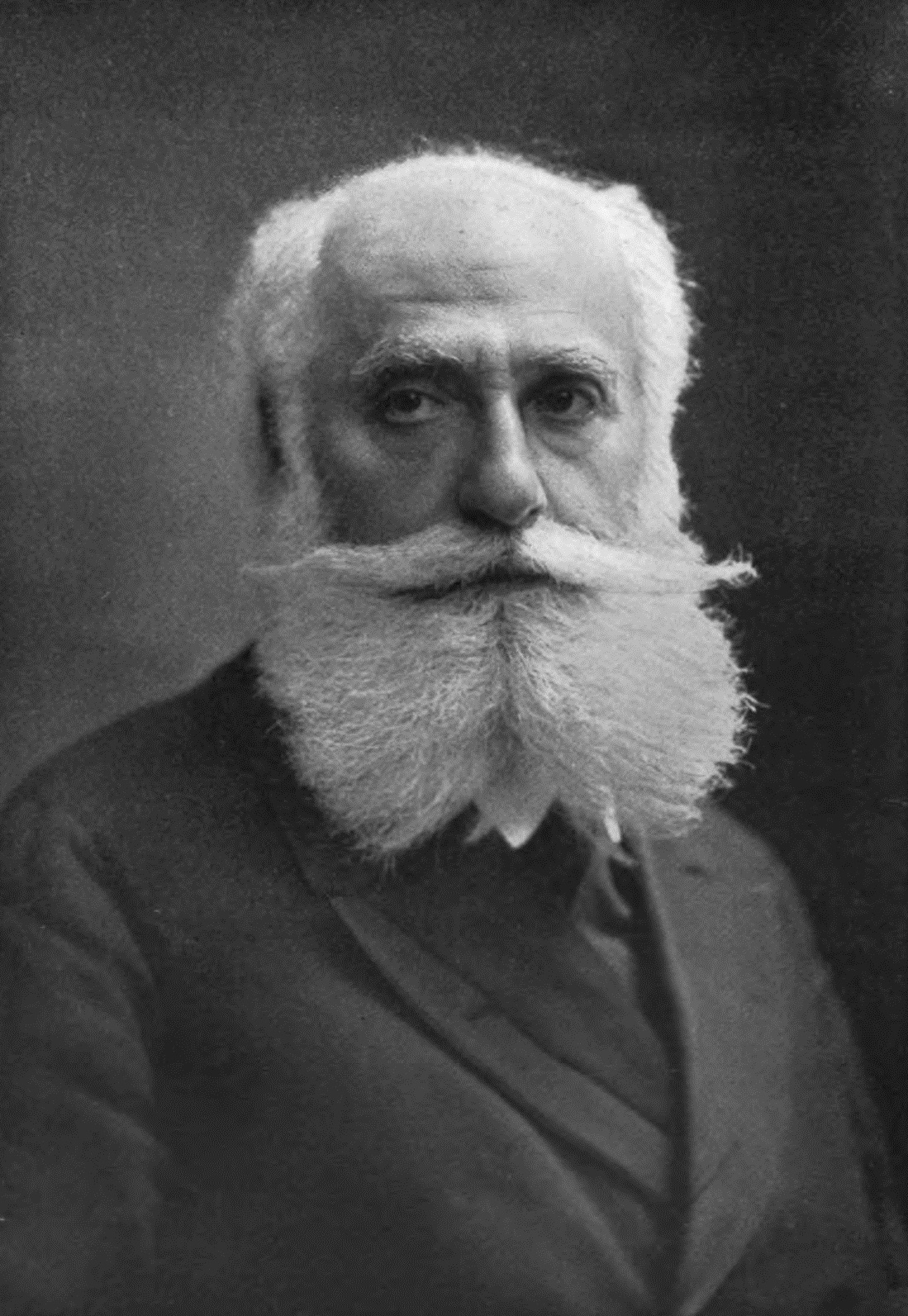
- Nordau, c. 1906
- Born: Simon Maximilian Südfeld; 29 July 1849; Pest, Austrian Empire
- Died: 23 January 1923 (aged 73); Paris, France
- Occupations: Physician; author; social critic
- Known for: Co-founder of the Zionist Organization
- Notable work: Degeneration (1892)

Max Simon Nordau (born Simon Maximilian Südfeld; 29 July 1849 – 23 January 1923) was a Jewish Zionist leader, physician, author, and social critic. He was a co-founder of the Zionist Organization together with Theodor Herzl, and president or vice-president of several Zionist congresses.

In his younger years, he was known as a social critic, writing The Conventional Lies of Our Civilisation (1883), Degeneration (1892), and Paradoxes (1896). By 1913, Nordau was established as the earliest major critic of modernism. Although not his most popular or successful work while alive, Degeneration is the book most often remembered and cited today.

== Biography ==
Simon (Simcha) Maximilian Südfeld (later Max Nordau) was born in the city of Pest, Kingdom of Hungary, then part of the Austrian Empire. His father, Gabriel Südfeld, was a rabbi, but earned his livelihood as a Hebrew tutor. As an Orthodox Jew, Nordau attended a Jewish elementary school, then a Lutheran Christian secondary school in the city of Pest, and later earned a medical degree from the University of Pest in 1872. He then traveled for six years, visiting the principal countries of Europe. He changed his name before going to Berlin in 1873. In 1878, he began the practice of medicine in Budapest. In 1880, he went to Paris. He worked in Paris as a correspondent for the Austrian daily newspaper Neue Freie Presse, and it was in Paris that he spent most of his life.

Before entering the university, he had begun his literary career in Budapest as a contributor and dramatic critic for the German language newspaper Der Zwischenact. Subsequently, he was an editorial writer and correspondent for several other newspapers. His newspaper writings were collected and furnished the material for his earlier books. He was a disciple of Cesare Lombroso.

Nordau was an example of a fully assimilated and acculturated European Jew. Despite being raised religious, Nordau was an agnostic. He married a Christian woman of Danish origin. Despite being born in Hungary, he felt affiliated to German culture, writing in an autobiographical sketch "When I reached the age of fifteen, I left the Jewish way of life and the study of the Torah ... Judaism remained a mere memory and since then I have always felt as a German and as a German only." Max Nordau was the father of the painter Maxa Nordau (1897–1993).

Nordau's conversion to Zionism was eventually triggered by the Dreyfus affair. Many Jews, amongst them Theodor Herzl, saw in the Dreyfus affair evidence of the universality of antisemitism.

Nordau went on to play a major role in the Zionist Organization; indeed, Nordau's relative fame certainly helped bring attention to the Zionist movement. He can be credited with giving the organization a democratic character.

In December 1903, the 24-year-old Jewish student Chaim Zelig Luban attempted to assassinate Nordau at a Parisian Hanukkah celebration. The attacker shouted "Death to the East African" as he fired his gun, a reference to Nordau's support for the Uganda Plan.

When World War I broke out, as a native of Austria-Hungary, he was accused by the French of enemy sympathies. He denied the charge and afterward went to reside in Madrid.

After the war, Nordau moved back to France. He died in Paris in 1923.

== Zionism ==
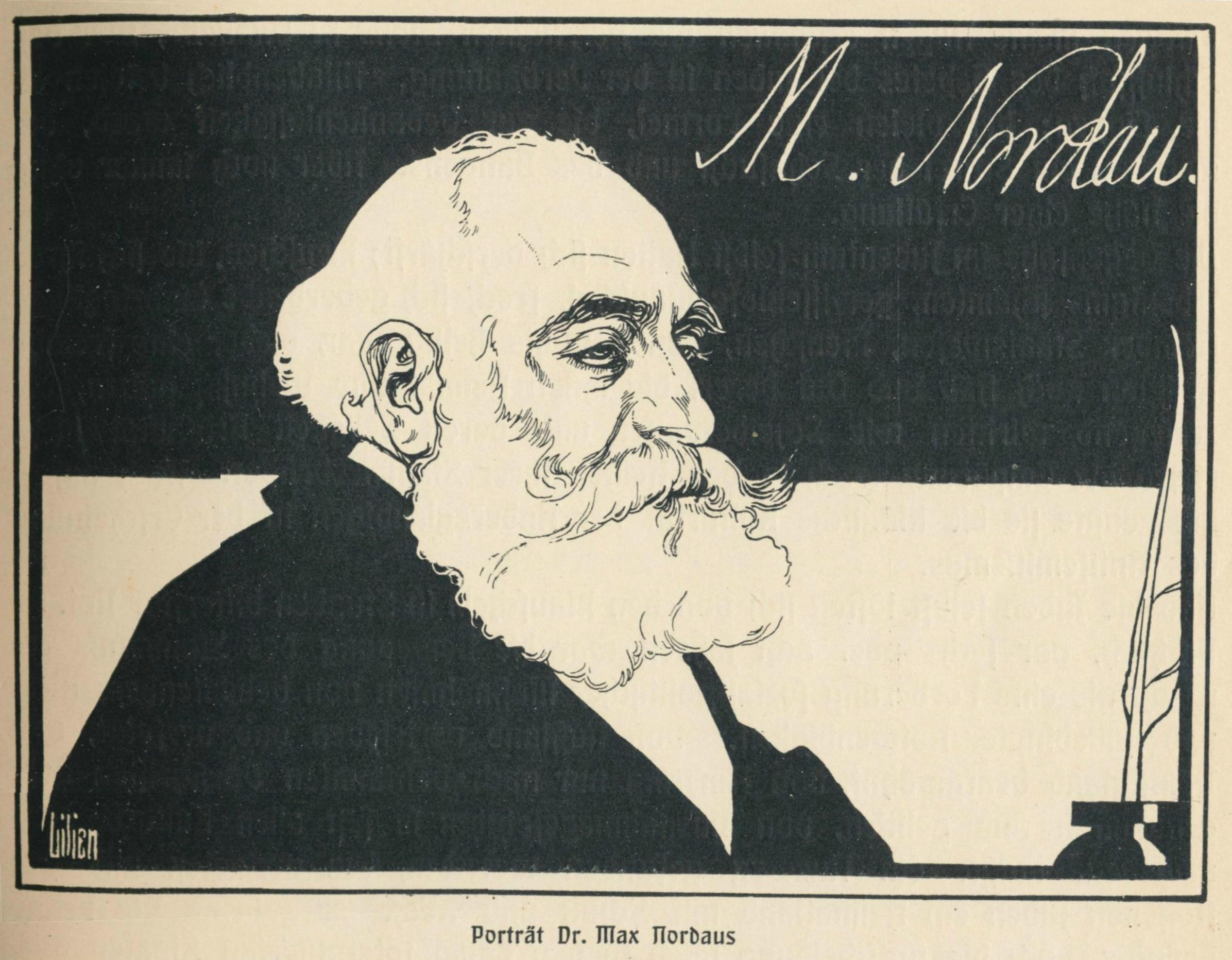
Portrait of Nordau by Ephraim Moses Lilien

=== Definition ===
In Écrits sionistes, Nordau defines the ‘new Zionism’ or ‘political Zionism’ as the natural continuation of the longstanding Jewish longing for Zion. He writes (translation from French): “The word Zionism is the new designation for something very old, insofar as it simply means the Jewish people’s desire to see Zion again. Since the destruction of the Second Temple by Titus, since the dispersion of the Jewish people among all nations, they have never ceased to ardently desire and firmly hope for their return to the land of their fathers, once lost to them.”

=== Dreyfus affair ===
Nordau's conversion to Zionism is in many ways typical of the rise of Zionism amongst Western European Jewry. The Dreyfus affair was central to Theodor Herzl's conviction that Zionism was now necessary. Herzl's views were formed during his time in France, where he recognized the universality of antisemitism; the Dreyfus Affair cemented his belief in the failure of assimilation. Nordau also witnessed the Paris mob outside the École Militaire crying "à morts les juifs!" ("death to the Jews!").

His role of friend and advisor to Herzl, who was working as the correspondent for the Viennese Neue Freie Presse, began here in Paris. This trial went beyond a miscarriage of justice and in Herzl's words "contained the wish of the overwhelming majority in France, to damn a Jew, and in this one Jew, all Jews". Whether or not the antisemitism manifested in France during the Dreyfus affair was indicative of the majority of the French or simply a very vocal minority is open to debate. However, the very fact that such sentiment had manifested itself in France was particularly significant. This was the country often seen as the model of the modern enlightened age, which had given Europe the Great Revolution and beginnings of Jewish emancipation.

=== Failure of emancipation ===
Nordau's work as a critic of European civilization and where it was heading certainly contributed to his eventual role in Zionism. One of the central tenets of Nordau's beliefs was evolution, in all things, and he concluded that emancipation was not born out of evolution. French rationalism of the 18th century, based on pure logic, demanded that all men be treated equally. Nordau perceived Jewish Emancipation as the result of "a regular equation: Every man is born with certain rights; the Jews are human beings, consequently the Jews are born to own the rights of man." This Emancipation was written in the statute books of Europe, but contrasted with popular social consciousness. It was this that explained the apparent contradiction of equality before the law. Yet the existence of antisemitism, and in particular 'racial' antisemitism, was no longer based on old religious bigotry. Nordau cited England as an exception to this continental antisemitism that proved the rule. "In England, Emancipation is a truth … It had already been completed in the heart before legislation expressly confirmed it." Only if Emancipation came from changes within society, as opposed to abstract ideas imposed upon society, could it be a reality. Nordau's rejection of the accepted idea of Emancipation was not based entirely on the Dreyfus Affair. It had manifested itself much earlier in The Conventional Lies of Our Civilisation (Die konventionellen Lügen der Kulturmenschheit) (1883), and in reviling 'degenerate' and 'lunatic' antisemitism in Degeneration (Die Entartung) (1892).

=== Muscular Judaism ===
Nordau also, at the 1898 Zionist Congress, coined the term "Muscular Judaism" (Muskeljudentum) as a descriptor of a Jewish culture and religion which directed its adherents to reach for certain moral and corporeal ideals which, through discipline, agility and strength, would result in a stronger, more physically assured, Jew who would outshine the long-held stereotype of the weak, intellectually sustained, Jew. He further explored the concept of the "muscle Jew" in a 1900 article of the Jewish Gymnastics Journal. His ideology was predated by "Muscular Christianity".

== Zionist Congress ==
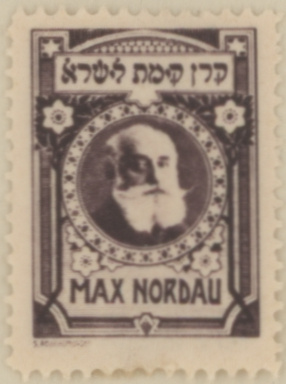
Nordau stamp issued by Jewish National Fund, 1916

Nordau was central to the Zionist Congresses, which played a vital part in shaping Zionism. Herzl had favoured the idea of a Jewish newspaper and an elitist "Society of Jews" to spread the ideas of Zionism. It was Nordau, convinced that Zionism had to at least appear democratic, despite the impossibility of representing all Jewish groups, who persuaded Herzl of the need for an assembly. This appearance of democracy certainly helped counter accusations that the "Zionists represented no one but themselves". There were to be eleven such Congresses in all. The first, which Nordau organized, was in Basle, 29–31 August 1897. His fame as an intellectual helped draw attention to the project. Indeed, the fact that Max Nordau, the trenchant essayist and journalist, was a Jew came as a revelation for many. Herzl obviously took centre stage, making the first speech at the Congress; Nordau followed him with an assessment of the Jewish condition in Europe. Nordau used statistics to paint a portrait of the dire straits of Eastern Jewry and also expressed his belief in the destiny of Jewish people as a democratic nation state, free of what he saw as the constraints of Emancipation.

Nordau's speeches to the Zionist Congress re-examined the Jewish people, in particular, stereotypes of the Jews. He fought against the tradition of seeing the Jews as merchants or business people, arguing that most modern financial innovations, such as insurance, had been invented by gentiles. He saw the Jewish people as having a unique gift for politics, a calling which they were unable to fulfil without their own nation-state. Whereas Herzl favoured the idea of an elite forming policy, Nordau insisted that the Congress have a democratic nature of some sort, calling for votes on key topics.

At the Sixth Zionist Congress, Nordau defended a Jewish state in the Holy Land, publicizing a support from the British Empire, the Kaiser, the Russian Empire and a possible support from the American government in a near future.

== Degeneration (1892) ==
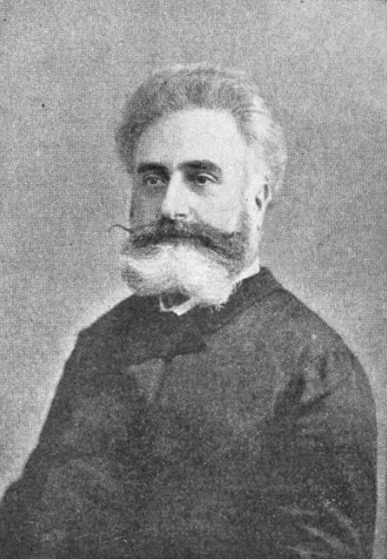
Portrait of Nordau in April 1895 edition of The Bookman

Nordau's major work Entartung (Degeneration) is a moralistic attack on what he believed to be degenerate art, as well as a polemic against the effects of a range of the rising social phenomena of the period, such as rapid urbanization and its perceived effects on the human body.

In his 1999 book Réflexions sur la question gay (translated into English as Insult and the Making of the Gay Self), Didier Eribon refers to a whole section in Nordau's book targeting Oscar Wilde in aggressive terms: "Wilde loves immorality, sin, and crime". According to Eribon, the two volumes of Degeneration are centred on a description of the artistic and literary currents of an "end-of-century" that was leading society to "ruin". Nordau attacks symbolists, mystics, Pre-Raphaelites, Wagnerism, Aestheticism, and Decadentism. Huysmans and Zola are also targeted by him as "neurotics" and "the worst kind of enemies of society", against whom the latter had "a duty to defend itself". He sustained that society was "at the highest of a serious intellectual epidemic, some kind of Black Death of degeneration and hysteria, such that it is only natural to hear a generalized, anguished questioning: 'What is going to happen?'" Therefore, he called upon judges, teachers, politicians, all those who wished to protect civilization, to organize repression and censorship. As for psychiatrists, their role would be predominant in such academia of "honest people" in charge of condemning "works that speculate on immorality". Any artist whom this small cluster of "the most qualified men of the people" might dislike would be doomed, because in such case "both the man and his work would be annihilated".

Nordau's Degeneration is cited by William James in his lecture on Neurology and Religion at the beginning of The Varieties of Religious Experience. James mocks the author for his "bulky book" on the grounds that he exemplifies the then-current school of medical materialism, stating that Nordau "has striven to impugn the value of works of genius in a wholesale way (such works of contemporary art, namely, as he himself is unable to enjoy, and they are many) by using medical arguments".

== Commemoration ==
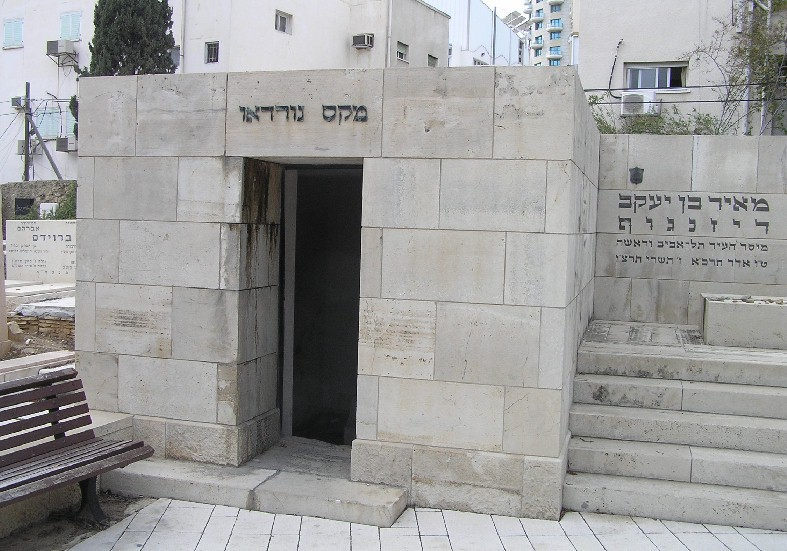
Tomb of Nordau, Tel Aviv

In 1926 Nordau's remains were moved to Tel Aviv's Trumpeldor Cemetery. A major Tel Aviv street is named Nordau Boulevard.

There has been a literary Nordau Prize awarded in Israel.

== Published works ==
- Pariser Studien und Bilder (Paris studies and sketches, 1878)
- Seifenblasen (Soap bubbles, 1879)
- Vom Kreml zur Alhambra (From the Kremlin to the Alhambra, 1880)
- Paris unter der dritten Republik (Paris under the Third Republic, 1881)
- Der Krieg der Millionen, a drama (The war of the millions, 1882)
- Die konventionelle Lügen der Kulturmenschheit, in which he shows what he believes to be the essential falsity of some of the social, ethical and religious standards of modern civilization (Conventional Lies of Society, 1883)
- Paradoxe (Paradoxes, 1885)
- Die Krankheit des Jahrhunderts (The Malady of the Century, 1887)
- Gefühlskomödie, a novel (A Comedy of Sentiment, 1891)
- Entartung (Degeneration, 1892)
- Seelen Analysen (Analysis of souls, 1892)
- Das Recht zu lieben, a drama (The right to live, 1893)
- Die Kugel, a drama (The ball, 1894)
- Die Drohnenschlacht (Battle of the drones, 1897)
- Dr. Kuhn, a drama (1898)
- The Drones Must Die (1899)
- Zeitgenossiche Franzosen (Contemporary French people, 1901)
- Morganatic (1904)
- On Art and Artists (1907)
- Die Sinn der Geschichte (The interpretation of history, 1909)
- Zionistische Schriften (Zionist writings, 1909)
- Mörchen (Crumbs of ruins, 1910)
- Der Lebenssport (The sport of life, 1912)

== See also ==
- Basel Program
- Dr. Max Nordau Synagogue
