= Russkaya Beseda =

Russian literary magazine

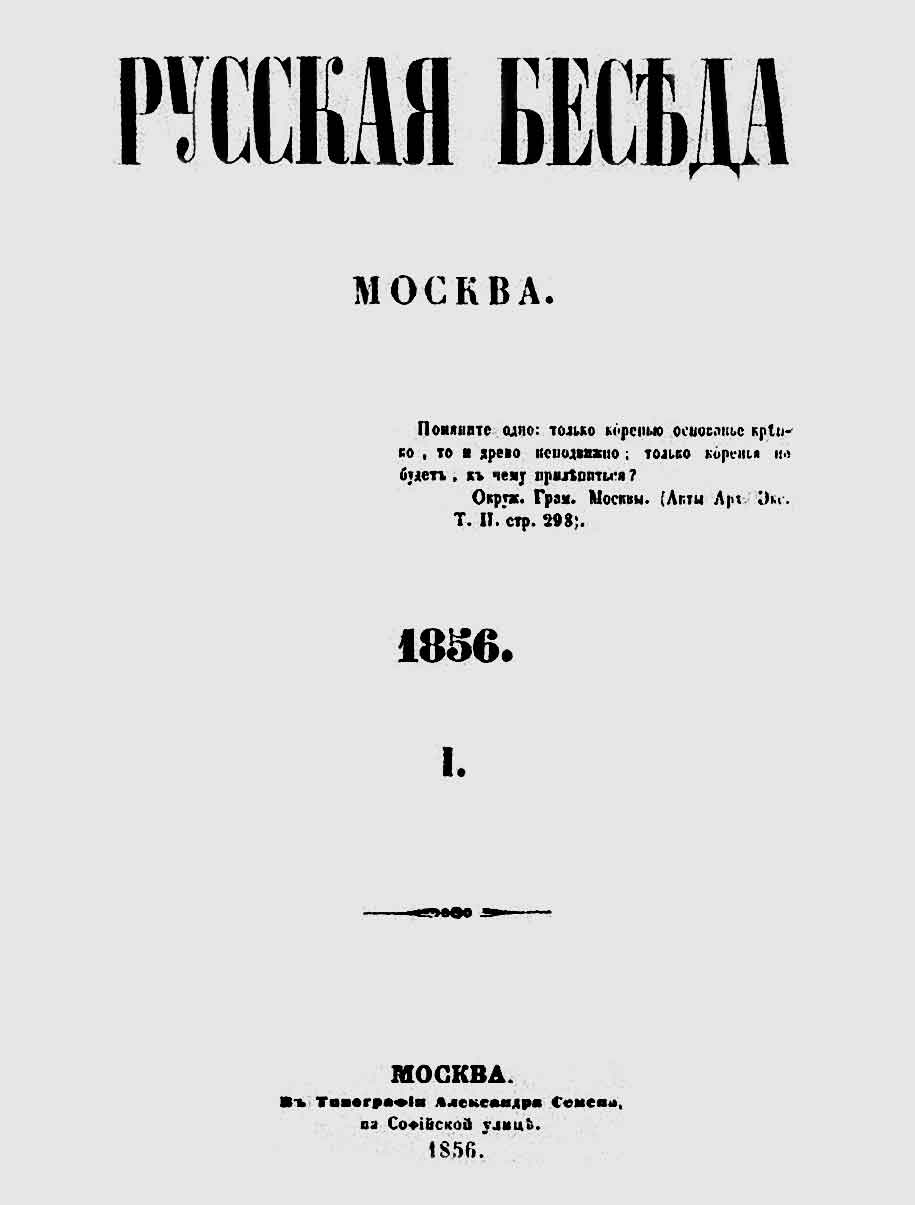
- First edition title page
- Editor: Aleksander Koshelev; Ivan Aksakov
- Categories: Literary magazine
- Frequency: Bi-monthly
- Founded: 1856
- Final issue: 1860
- Based in: Moscow, Russian Empire
- Language: Russian

Russkaya Beseda (Russian: Ру′сская бесе′да, English: The Russian Colloquy) was a Russian literary magazine founded in Moscow, Russian Empire, in 1856 by Alexander Koshelev who remained its editor-in-chief until 1858, when Ivan Aksakov joined in as co-editor. The magazine was published on a bi-monthly basis and was belonged to the Slavophile movement; most prominent in it were the literature, science and criticism sections. Selskoye Blagoustroistvo (Agrarian landscaping) was added as a supplement in 1858–1859. Russkaya Beseda targeted for broad and mixed readership and but, frequently covered articles about the future of the Slavic peoples. Among the authors who regularly contributed to the magazine, were Sergei Aksakov, Vladimir Dal, Aleksey K. Tolstoy, Alexander Ostrovsky, Aleksey Khomyakov, Fyodor Tyutchev, Ivan Nikitin, Taras Shevchenko. It ceased publication in 1860.
