= Olga Chyumina =

Russian poet and translator

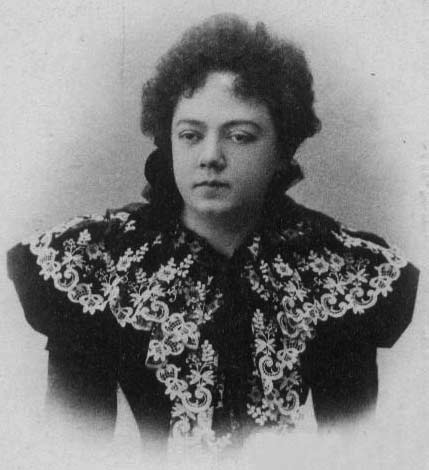
- Born: Olga Nikolayevna Chyumina; Ольга Николаевна Чюмина; 7 January 1865 (or 1863); Novgorod, Russian Empire
- Died: 8 September 1909 (aged 44); St Petersburg, Russian Empire
- Occupations: poet, novelist, playwright, translator
- Spouse: G.P. Mikhaylov

Olga Nikolayevna Chyumina (Russian: О́льга Никола́евна Чю́мина, 7 January 1865, (Note: According to the Brief Literary Encyclopedia; the Brockhaus and Efron Dictionary gives the year as 1862 old style) Novgorod, Russian Empire, - 8 September 1909, Saint Petersburg, Russian Empire) was a poet, novelist, playwright and translator from the Russian Empire.

Having debuted as a published author in 1882, she contributed regularly to Vestnik Evropy, Russkaya Mysl, Severny Vestnik, Russkoye Bogatstvo. Her popular books of poetry included Poems (1897), New Poems (1905) and Autumn Whirlwinds (Осенние вихри, 1908). During the 1905 Revolution, she wrote the satirical, anti-Tsarist 'feuilletons in verse' (using the pen names Cat the Fighter and Optimist) which were collected in the books In Waiting (В ожидании, 1905) and The Days of Freedom (На темы дней свободы, 1906).

Chyumina authored two novels in the genre of psychological drama, For Life and for Death (На жизнь и на смерть, 1895) and For the Sins of Fathers (За грехи отцов, 1896), as well as about twenty plays. Some of them, like Redemption (Искупление), In Dragnets (В сетях), The Dream (Мечта) and Extinguished Spark (Угасшая искра) have been produced by the Alexandrinka. Her collection Dramas and Translations came out in Moscow in 1904.

Among the poets and dramatists whose work she translated into Russian, were Jose-Maria de Heredia, Sully Prudhomme, Leconte de Lisle, Robert Hamerling, Alfred Tennyson and Elizabeth Barrett Browning, as well as William Shakespeare and Friedrich Schiller.
