= Franz Xaver von Wegele =

German historian

- Born: 29 October 1823; Landsberg am Lech, Bavaria
- Died: 17 October 1897 (aged 73); Würzburg, Germany
- Education: Ludwig-Maximilians-Universität München, Heidelberg University, University of Jena
- Occupation: historian
- Known for: his studies on the history of Thuringia, Franconia
- Notable work: see Selected works

Franz Xaver von Wegele (29 October 1823 in Landsberg am Lech – 17 October 1897 in Würzburg) was a German historian, largely known for his studies on the history of Thuringia, Franconia and the University of Würzburg.

== Education and career ==
He studied history at the Ludwig-Maximilians-Universität München and Heidelberg University, where his influences were Friedrich Christoph Schlosser, Ludwig Häusser and Georg Gottfried Gervinus. In 1849, he obtained his habilitation at the University of Jena, and two years later became an associate professor of history. In 1857, he relocated to the University of Würzburg as a full professor. In 1863, he was named university rector.

== Selected works ==
- Dante’s Leben und Werke : kulturgeschichtlich dargest., 1852 – Dante's life and works. Cultural historical depiction.
- Annales Reinhardsbrunnenses, (as editor) 1854 – Annals of Reinhardsbrunn.
- Arnold von Selenhofen, Erzbischof von Mainz (1153–1160), (1855) – Arnold of Selenhofen, Archbishop of Mainz.
- Zur Literatur und Kritik der Fränkischen Necrologien, 1864 – Literature and critique of Franconian necrologies.
- Friedrich der Freidige, Markgraf von Meißen, Landgraf von Thüringen, und die Wettiner seiner Zeit : 1247 - 1325, (1870) – Friedrich the Brave, Margrave of Meissen, Landgrave of Thuringia, and the Wettiner of his time.
- Kaiser Friedrich I., Barbarossa, 1871 – Frederick Barbarossa.
- Graf Otto von Hennenberg-Botenlauben und sein Geschlecht (1180–1250), (1875) – Otto von Botenlauben and his lineage.
- Göthe als Historiker, 1876 – Goethe as an historian.
- Geschichte der Universität Wirzburg (2 parts), 1882 – History of the University of Würzburg.
- Geschichte der deutschen Historiographie seit dem Auftreten des Humanismus, 1885 – History of German historiography since the advent of Humanism.

Wegele was the author of many articles in the Allgemeine Deutsche Biographie.
