= Alexander Veselovsky =

Russian philologist (1838–1906)

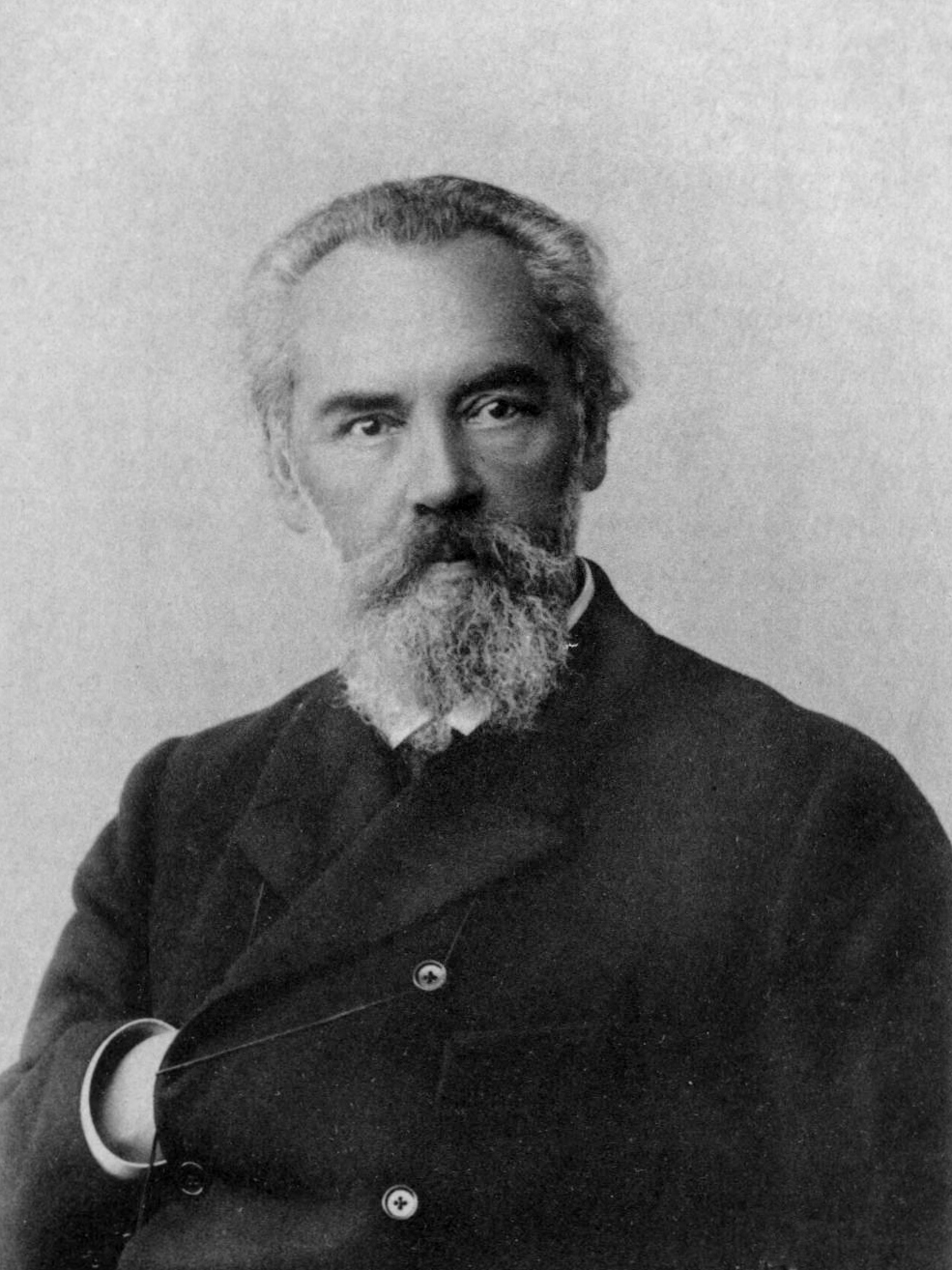
- Born: February 4, 1838; Moscow
- Died: October 10, 1906 (aged 68); Saint Petersburg
- Education: Doctor of Science (1872)
- Alma mater: Imperial Moscow University (1895)
- Scientific career
- Fields: Philology, history
- Doctoral advisor: Fyodor Buslaev

Alexander Nikolayevich Veselovsky (Russian: Алекса́ндр Никола́евич Весело́вский) (16 February [O.S. 4 February] 1838 in Moscow – 23 October [O.S. 10 October] 1906 in St. Petersburg) was a leading Russian literary theorist who laid the groundwork for comparative literary studies.

== Life and work ==
A general's son, Veselovsky studied privately with Fyodor Buslaev and attended the Moscow University from 1854 to 1858. After a brief stint in Spain as a tutor to the Russian ambassador's son, Veselovsky continued his education with Heymann Steinthal in Berlin and Prague and spent three years working in the libraries of Italy. Upon his return to Russia, he delivered lectures in Moscow and St. Petersburg and was elected a Member of the St. Petersburg Academy of Sciences in 1876.

Veselovsky's early studies of medieval Italian literature led him to believe that many plots and literary devices were imported to Europe from the Orient through Byzantium. Looking at literature primarily from a genetic point of view, Alexander Veselovsky and his brother Aleksey (1843-1918) attempted to construct a comprehensive theory of the origin and development of poetry. In 1899, Veselovsky famously argued that "the font and syncretic root of poetic genres" may be traced to ritualized popular games and folk incantations.

== Influence ==
In the Soviet Union, Veselovsky and his followers were criticized for their "ethnographism", which allowed "source study to grow to a hypertrophied degree, thus dissolving the specific character of the literary work into a collection of influences". On 14 August 1946 the Central Committee of the Communist Party adopted a resolution specifically condemning "kowtowing" to the bourgeois West by the so-called Veselovskyists. The Russian Formalists largely shared a critical view of Veselovsky's theory, although it has been suggested that Veselovsky's doctrine was actually a point from which they evolved "in a linear, if polemical, way".

Although his work has been largely forgotten by Western scholarship (probably due to lack of translations), Veselovsky has been called "one of the most erudite and original scholars Russia has produced" and "the most remarkable representative of comparative literary study in Russian and European scholarship of the nineteenth century".

== Bibliography ==
- Andreev, A.; Tsygankov, D. (2010). Imperial Moscow University: 1755-1917: encyclopedic dictionary. Moscow: Russian political encyclopedia (ROSSPEN). pp. 124–125. ISBN 978-5-8243-1429-8.
