= Ivan Shcheglov =

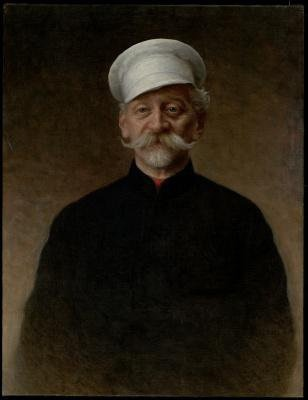
Ivan Shcheglov

Ivan Leontievich Leontiev (Леонтьев, Иван Леонтьевич Saint Petersburg, 1856–1911) was an officer in the army of the Russian Empire, who wrote plays and novels under the pen name Ivan Shcheglov. His best known work is The Dacha Husband (Dachnyi muzh). The first English translation of Shcheglov's novel was made by Michael R. Katz in 2009.
