= Sergey Yuriev =

Russian journalist, editor, publisher, translator, theatre critic and essayist

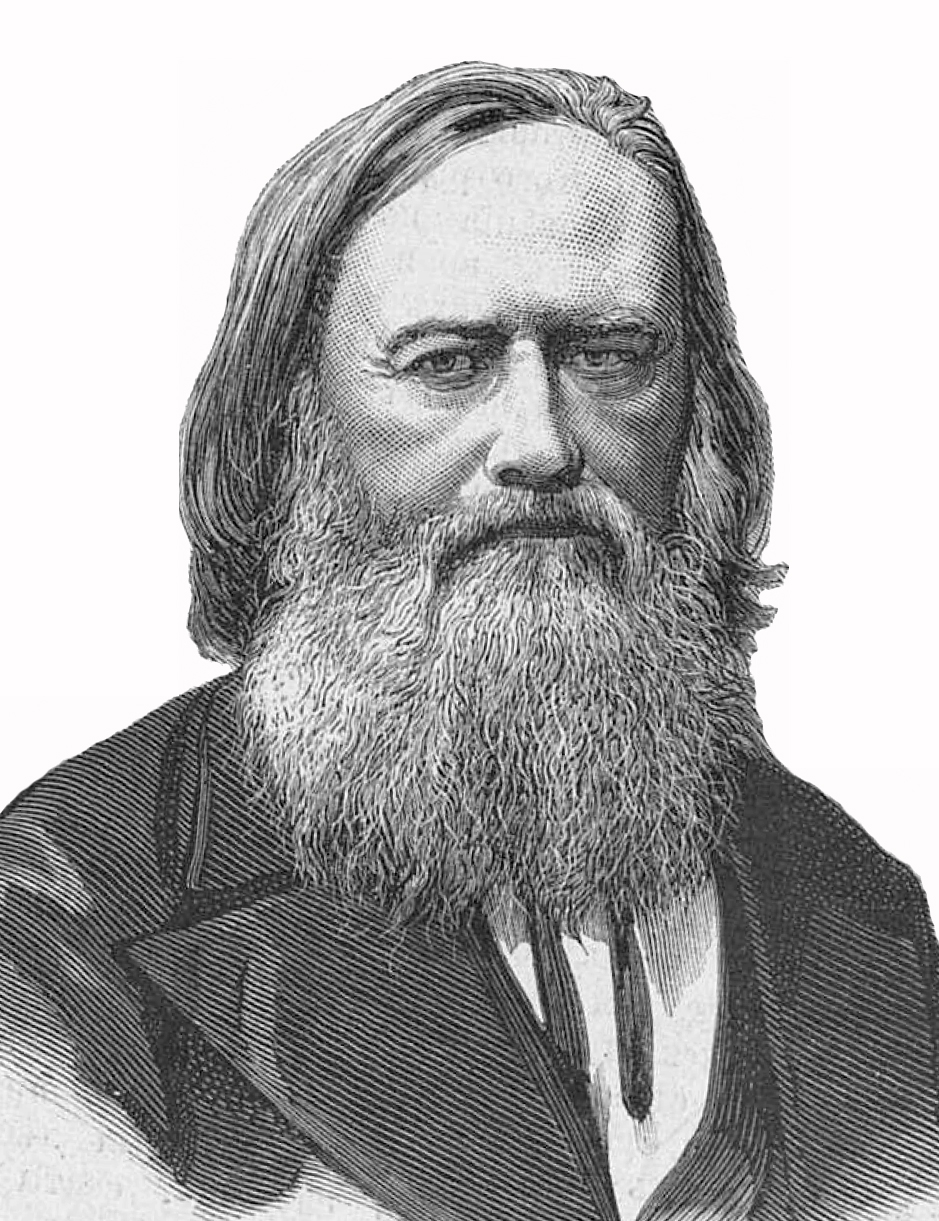
- Born: Sergey Andreyevich Yuriev; Сергей Андреевич Юрьев; 25 May 1821; Kalyazin region, Tver Governorate, Russian Empire
- Died: 7 January 1889 (aged 67); Saint Petersburg, Russian Empire
- Occupations: editor, translator, journalist

Sergey Andreyevich Yuriev (Russian: Сергей Андреевич Юрьев, 25 May 1821, village Voskresenskoye, Tver Governorate, Russian Empire, — 7 January 1889, Moscow, Russian Empire) was a Russian journalist, editor, publisher, translator, theatre critic and essayist, associated with the Slavophile circles.

In 1871-1872, using the financial support provided by Alexander Koshelev, Yuriev published the magazine Beseda and was for a while in correspondence with Fyodor Dostoyevsky, concerning the latter's proposed participation in it. In 1880 he became the first editor-in-chief of Russkaya Mysl and remained at the helm of it for five years. In 1878 Yuriev was elected the chairman of the Russian Literature Society, and after the death of Alexander Ostrovsky succeeded him as the chairman of the Society of Russian Dramatists and Opera Composers.

Yuriev is best remembered for his acclaimed translations of William Shakespeare, as well as the Spanish drama classics, including some major works by Pedro Calderón de la Barca and Lope de Vega, which were collected in the compilation Spanish Theatre in Its Prime, published in 1877 in Russia.
