= Degeneration (Nordau) =

Two-volume book by Max Nordau

- Author: Max Nordau
- Original title: Entartung
- Language: German
- Genre: Social criticism
- Publication date: 1892
- Publication place: Hungary
- Text: Degeneration at Internet Archive

Degeneration (German: Entartung, 1892–1893) is a two-volume work of social criticism by Max Nordau.

Within this work he attacks what he believed to be degenerate art and comments on the effects of a range of social phenomena of the period, such as rapid urbanization and its perceived effects on the human body. Nordau believed degeneration should be diagnosed as a mental illness because those who were deviant were sick and required therapy. He wrote, "[T]he clearest notion we can form of degeneracy is to regard it as a morbid deviation from an original type. This deviation, even if, at the outset, it was ever so slight, contained transmissible elements of such a nature that anyone bearing in him the germs becomes more and more incapable of fulfilling his functions in the world; and mental progress, already checked in his own person, finds itself menaced also in his descendants." These comments stemmed from his background as a trained physician, taught by the Parisian neurologist Jean-Martin Charcot.

== Summary ==
Nordau begins his work with a "medical" and social interpretation of what has created this degeneration in society. Nordau divides his study into five books. In the first book, Nordau identifies the phenomenon of fin de siècle in Europe. He sees this as first being recognised, though not originating, in France, describing this phenomenon as "a contempt for the traditional views of custom and morality". He sees it as a sort of decadence, a world-weariness, and the wilful rejection of the moral boundaries governing the world. He uses examples from French periodicals and books in French to show how it has affected all elements of society. Nordau also accuses society of becoming more and more inclined to imitate what they see in art. He sees in the fashionable society of Paris and London that "[e]very single figure strives visibly by some singularity in outline, set, cut or colour, to startle attention violently, and imperiously to detain it. Each one wishes to create a strong nervous excitement, no matter whether agreeably or disagreeably".

Nordau establishes the cultural phenomenon of fin de siècle in the opening pages, but he quickly moves to the viewpoint of a physician and identifies what he sees as an illness:

The manifestations described in the preceding chapter must be patent enough to everyone, be he never so narrow a Philistine. The Philistine, however, regards them as a passing fashion and nothing more; for him the current terms, caprice, eccentricity, affectation of novelty, imitation, instinct, afford a sufficient explanation. The purely literary mind, whose merely æsthetic culture does not enable him to understand the connections of things, and to seize their real meaning, deceives himself and others as to his ignorance by means of sounding phrases, and loftily talks of a 'restless quest of a new ideal by the modern spirit', 'the richer vibrations of the refined nervous system of the present day', 'the unknown sensations of an elect mind'. But the physician, especially if he have devoted himself to the special study of nervous and mental maladies, recognises at a glance, in the fin-de-siècle disposition, in the tendencies of contemporary art and poetry, in the life and conduct of men who write mystic, symbolic and 'decadent' works and the attitude taken by their admirers in the tastes and aesthetic instincts of fashionable society, the confluence of two well-defined conditions of disease, with which he [the physician] is quite familiar, viz. degeneration and hysteria, of which the minor stages are designated as neurasthenia. These two conditions of the organism differ from each other, yet have many features in common, and frequently occur together; so that it is easier to observe them in their composite forms, than each in isolation.

The book deals with numerous case studies of various artists, writers and thinkers (Oscar Wilde, Henrik Ibsen, Richard Wagner and Friedrich Nietzsche to name a few), but its basic premise remains that society and human beings themselves are degenerating, and this degeneration is both reflected in and influenced by art, where "degenerate" artists produce "degenerate" art.

Nordau identifies a degenerate component in the contemporary, widespread practice of spiritualism in France. He argues that excessive modernization leads to a return of the irrational, including renewed interest in magic. In this way, Nordau presents a reversal of the sociological theories of disenchantment and rationalization. Among the systems Nordau criticizes as degenerate and spiritualistic is Jean-Martin Charcot's systematization of hypnosis, which was an important predecessor to Freudian and Jungian psychoanalysis.

== Politics ==
Nordau did not invent the concept of "degeneracy", which had been used by "racialist" Joseph-Arthur de Gobineau in his essay on the inequality of the human races; but did coin the concept of "Degenerate Art" as a form of social contagion that spread "immoral" or "degenerate" ideas, and as a symptom of this perceived "degeneracy"; a concept which would be eagerly seized by the Nazi Party in the Degenerate Art exhibition in Munich (1937), and be further developed into book burnings and the formation of the Reichskulturkammer to control and censor the discussion, creation, and dissemination of art under the guise of preventing "degeneracy". By the early 20th century, the idea that society was degenerating and that this degeneration was influenced by art led to backlash, as evidenced by the conviction of Austrian artist Egon Schiele for "distributing pornography to minors".

Degeneration was accepted as a serious medical term (see Degeneracy (biology), which Nordau uniquely applied to psychology and art). Not until Sigmund Freud and the ushering in of a new age of psychoanalysis was this idea seriously contested. Freud remarked in his 1905 work Three Essays on the Theory of Sexuality that "it may well be asked whether an attribution of 'degeneracy' is of any value or adds anything to our knowledge".

Christopher Hitchens critiqued Degeneration for including homophobic, misogynistic, racist, and phrenological ideas.

== Editions and translations ==
Degeneration has been translated into English by Howard Fertig, based on the second German edition of the text. Fertig's translation has been digitized and reprinted several times.

== Sources ==
- "Max Nordau and His 'Degeneration'", Introduction to Max Nordau, Degeneration, xi–xxxiv, New York: Howard Fertig, 1968.

== Digitized version ==
- https://archive.org/details/b28118820_0001/mode/2up
