= List of productions directed by Konstantin Stanislavski =

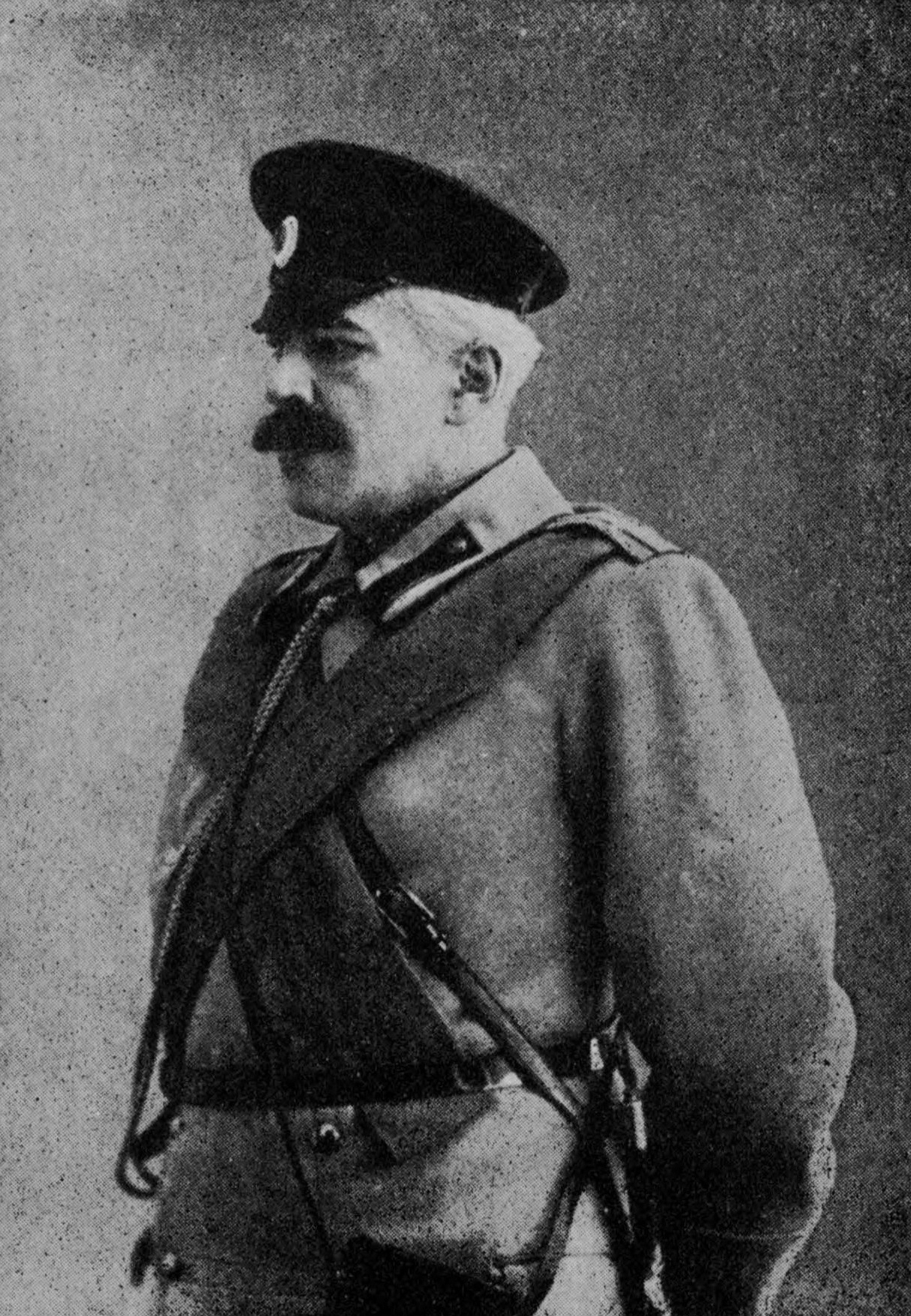
Konstantin Stanislavski as Vershinin in Anton Chekhov's Three Sisters.

This article offers a chronological list of productions directed by Konstantin Stanislavski. It does not include theatrical productions in which Stanislavski only acted.

Until he was thirty three, Stanislavski appeared only as an amateur onstage and as a director, as a result of his family's discouragement. When he was twenty five, he helped to establish a Society of Art and Literature, which aimed to unite amateur and professional actors and artists. His professional career began in 1896 when he co-founded the Moscow Art Theatre (MAT) with Vladimir Nemirovich-Danchenko. Later in his life, he created a series of studios whose aims were primarily pedagogical but which also presented public performances. This list of productions directed by Stanislavski includes amateur, professional, and studio productions.

When the sources disagree about the exact date of a production's première, that given in the most recent biography of Stanislavski—Jean Benedetti's Stanislavski: His Life and Art (1988, revised and expanded 1999)—is listed here, with the alternative date detailed in the footnotes. Prior to 14 February 1918, the Julian calendar was in use in Russia, after which the Gregorian calendar was introduced. The details of productions staged before that change are given in both Old Style and New Style dates.

== Productions at the Society of Art and Literature ==
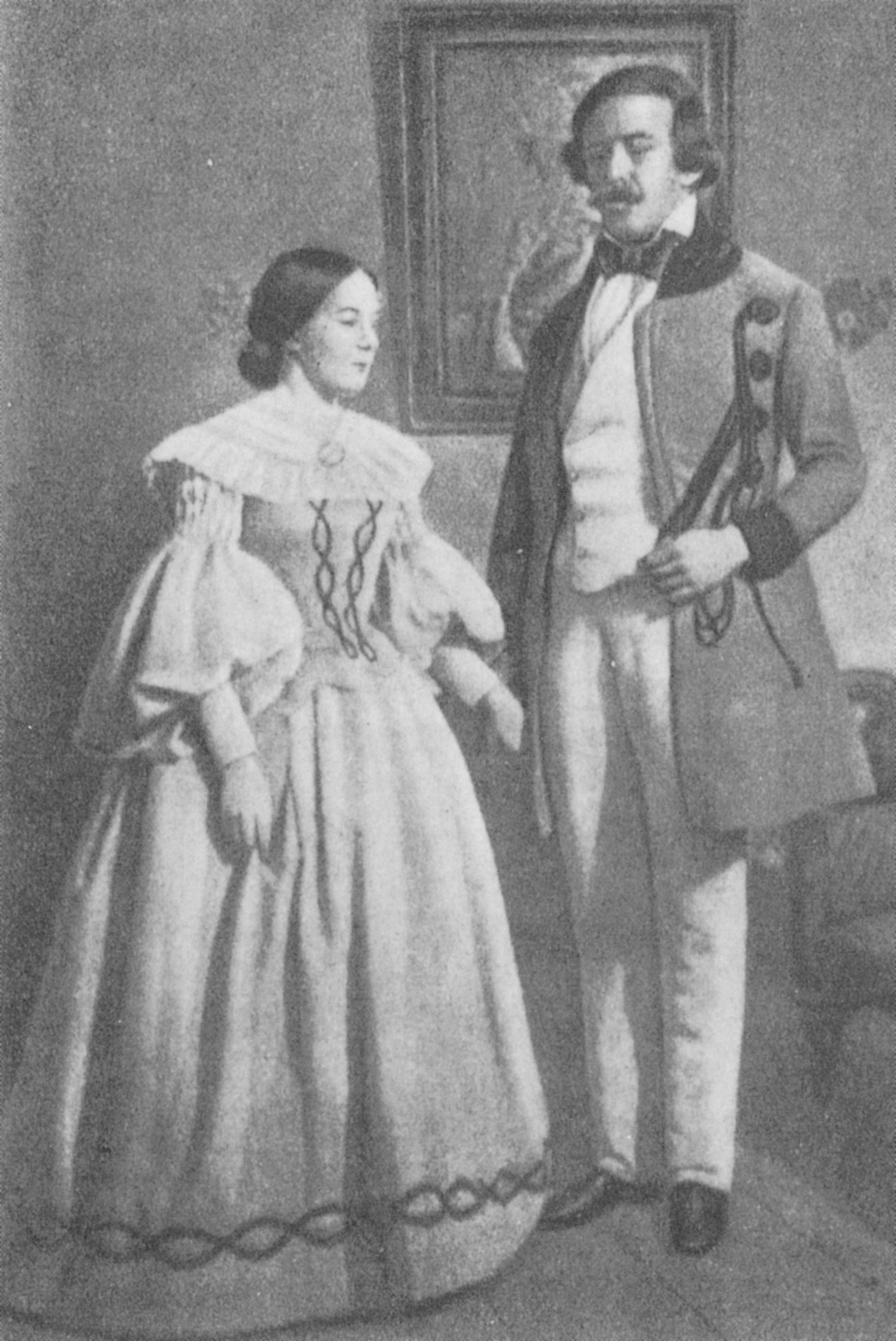
Stanislavski and his wife Lilina in his adaptation of Dostoyevsky's The Village of Stepanchikovo (Foma) for the Society of Art and Literature. Photograph taken in 1893.

- 1891: The Fruits of Enlightenment by Leo Tolstoy. Opened on 20 February [O.S. 8 February] at the German (Nemetsky) Club. Cast included Maria Lilina, Alexander Sanin, Alexander Artem, Vasily Luzhsky, Maria Samarova, and Vera Komissarzhevskaya; Stanislavski played Zvesdinstsev. Reviewing the production, Vladimir Nemirovich-Danchenko wrote of Stanislavski's performance that "no one has ever seen such an exemplary performance on an amateur stage."
- 1891: Foma by Fyodor Dostoyevsky, adapted by Stanislavski from The Village of Stepanchikovo. Opened on 26 November [O.S. 14 November] at the German Club. Cast included Stanislavski as Colonel Rostanev and Maria Lilina as Nastenka.
- 1894: The Governor by Victor Diachenko. Cast included Stanislavski as George Dorci. Opened on 19 February [O.S. 7 February].
- 1894: Light Without Heat by Alexander Ostrovsky and N. Y. Solovyev. Opened on 27 December [O.S. 15 December]. Cast included Stanislavski as Rabachev and Maria Andreyeva who made her stage debut as Olya Vasilkova.
- 1895: Uriel Acosta by Karl Gutzkow. Opened on 21 January [O.S. 9 January]. Cast included Stanislavski as Acosta.
- 1895: Men Above the Law by Aleksey Pisemsky. Opened on 18 December [O.S. 6 December] at the Solodovnikov Theatre. Cast included Stanislavski as the elderly general, Prince Imshin.
- 1896: Othello by William Shakespeare. Opened on 31 January [O.S. 19 January] at the Solodovnikov Theatre. Cast included Stanislavski as Othello and Khristofor Petrossyan as Iago. Vsevolod Meyerhold was greatly impressed by Stanislavski's performance, though Stanislavski was dissatisfied.
- 1896: The Assumption of Hannele by Gerhart Hauptmann. Cast included Anna Aleeva-Shteker as Hanna. Opened on 14 April [O.S. 2 April] at the Solodovnikov Theatre.
- 1896: The Polish Jew by Erckmann-Chatrian. Opened on 1 December [O.S. 19 November]. Cast included Stanislavski as Matthias.
- 1896: Without a Dowry by Alexander Ostrovsky. Opened on 31 December [O.S. 19 December 1896].
- 1897: Much Ado About Nothing by William Shakespeare. Opened on 18 February [O.S. 6 February]. Cast included Stanislavski as Benedick.
- 1897: Twelfth Night by William Shakespeare. Opened on 29 December [O.S. 17 December]. Cast included Stanislavski as Malvolio.
- 1898: The Sunken Bell by Gerhart Hauptmann. Opened on 8 February [O.S. 27 January]. Cast included Stanislavski as Heinrich. This was the first production on which Stanislavski worked with the scenic designer Viktor Simov. Princess Elizaveta Fedorovna saw the production three times.

== Productions at the Moscow Art Theatre ==
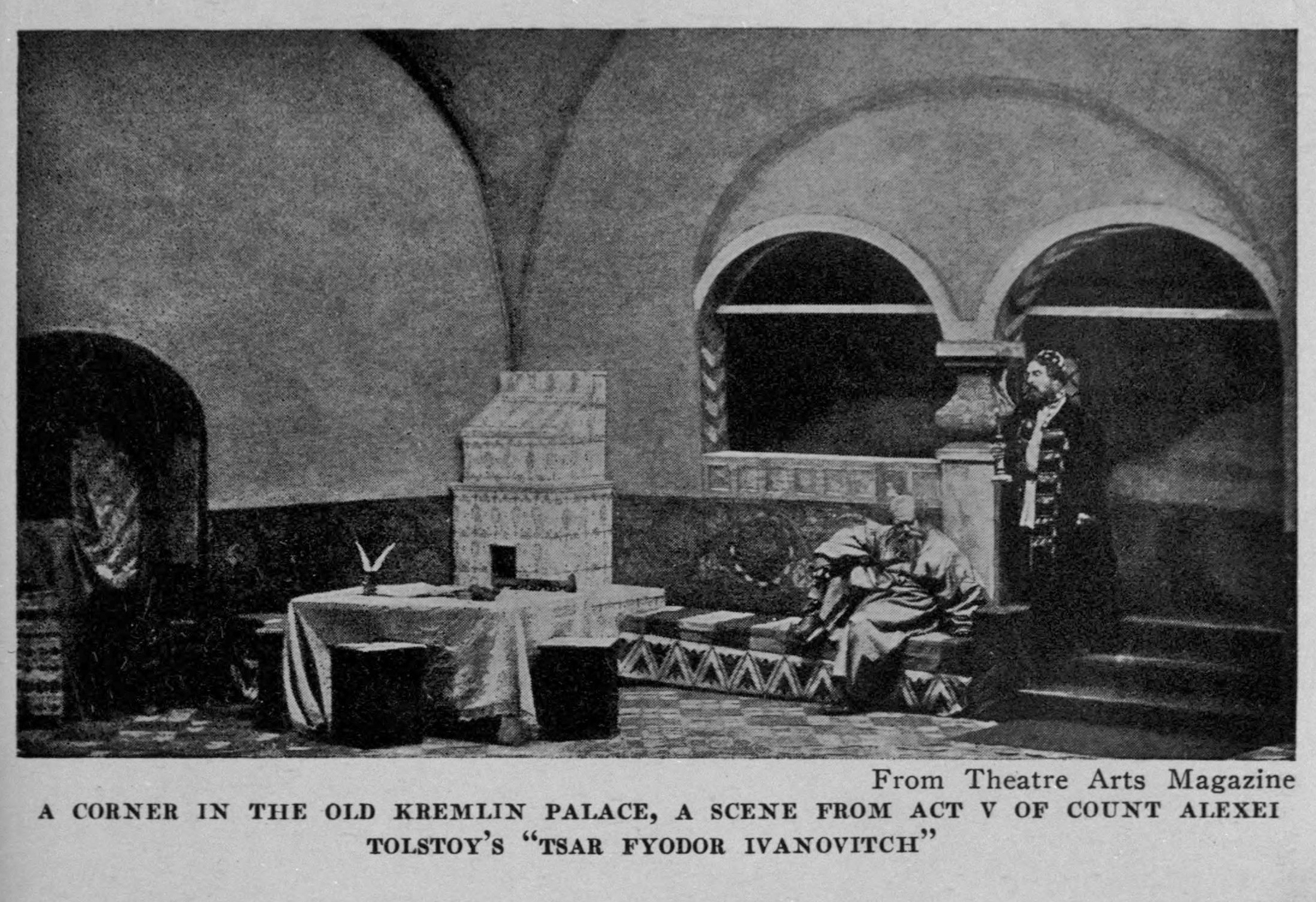
The Moscow Art Theatre's production of Tsar Fyodor Ioannovich by Alexei Tolstoy. Photograph taken during the company's tour to the USA in 1923.

- 1898: Tsar Fyodor Ioannovich by Alexei Tolstoy. Opened on 26 October [O.S. 14 October]. Directed by Stanislavski and Alexander Sanin. Scenic design by Viktor Simov. Cast included Vsevolod Meyerhold as Prince Vasili Shuysky, Olga Knipper as Princess Irina, Maria Roksanova as Princess Mstislavskaya, Alexander Vishnevsky as Boris Godunov, Vasily Luzhsky as Prince Ivan Shuysky, Mikhail Darski as Prince Andrey Shuysky, Alexander Sanin as Lup-Kleshnin, Georgy Burdzhalov as Mikhaylo Golovin, Maria Samarova as Volokhova and Alexander Artem as Kryukov; Ivan Moskvin initially played Fedor, followed by Vasily Kachalov and then Nikolai Khmelev. The censor insisted on the removal of all religious characters from the production.
- 1898: The Sunken Bell by Gerhart Hauptmann. Revival of Stanislavski's Society of Art and Literature production from January the same year. Opened on 31 October [O.S. 19 October]. Scenic design by Viktor Simov. Cast included Stanislavski as Heinrich, Ekaterina Munt as the First Elf, Margarita Savitskaya as Magda and Georgy Burdzhalov as the Wood Demon. Just over one week and 17 performances later, protests from the Russian Orthodox Church led to the production being banned on 8 November [O.S. 27 October], despite the particular translation used having been passed by the censor.
- 1898: The Merchant of Venice by William Shakespeare. The production was re-titled Shylock. Opened on 2 November [O.S. 21 October]. Scenic design by Viktor Simov. Cast included Mikhail Darski as Shylock, Alexander Vishnevsky as Antonio, Vsevolod Meyerhold as the Prince of Aragon, Georgy Burdzhalov as Launcelot Gobbo. This production was the first in Russia to include the fifth act of the play, after the trial scene and humiliation of Shylock, when the intrigue of Portia's ring and cross-dressing is revealed and resolved. The portrayal of Shylock prompted accusations in the press of anti-Semitism because a Jewish accent was considered inappropriate for a tragic role. Though Stanislavski had planned to alternate the role with Darski, he decided against it for fear of exacerbating the hostility of the press. It was played for only ten performances.
- 1898: Men Above the Law by Aleksey Pisemsky. Opened on 16 November [O.S. 4 November]. Scenic design by Viktor Simov. Cast included Stanislavski as Platon Imshin, Alexander Artyom as Devochkin, Ivan Moskvin as podyachy, Vasily Luzhsky as Sergey Imshin, Evgeniya Rayevskaya as Princess Natalya and Georgy Burdzhalov as Kadushkin. It played for only nine performances.

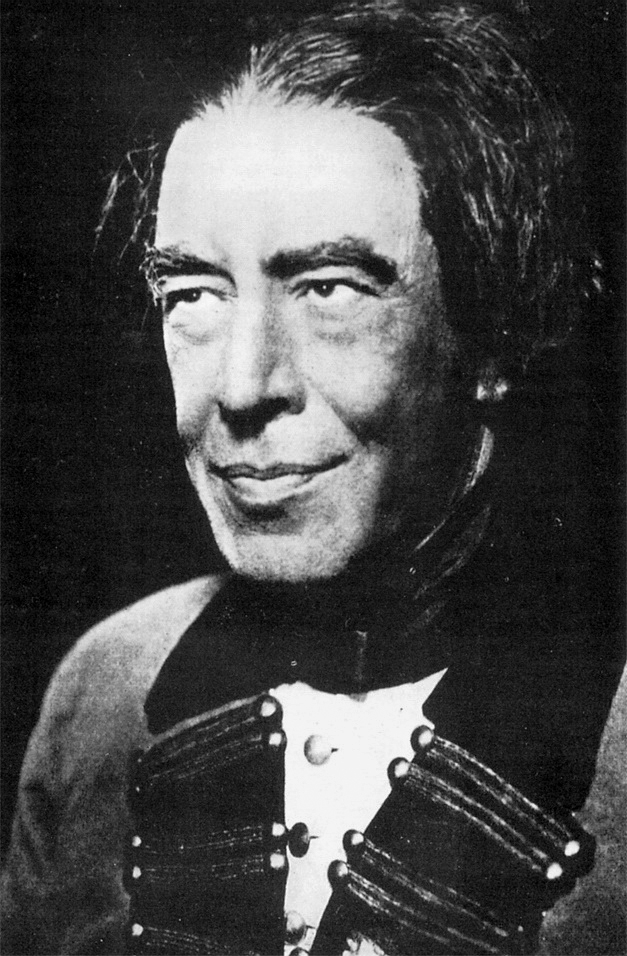
Stanislavski as Ripafratta in his Moscow Art Theatre production of Carlo Goldoni's comedy The Mistress of the Inn.

- 1898: The Mistress of the Inn by Carlo Goldoni. Opened on 14 December [O.S. 2 December]. Scenic design by Viktor Simov. Cast included Stanislavski as Ripafratta, Vsevolod Meyerhold as the Marquis of Forlipopoli, and Sergey Tarasov as Ripafratta's servant. A special performance for factory workers on 22 January [O.S. 10 January] 1899 provoked a summons by the Chief of Police, Dmitri Trepov, for failing to seek the approval of the censor who oversaw productions for working-class audiences; as a result, the company abandoned its original name as the "Moscow Public-Accessible Theatre" and its aim to provide an "open" theatre, settling instead on Anton Chekhov's suggestion, the "Moscow Art Theatre."
- 1898: The Seagull by Anton Chekhov. Opened on 29 December [O.S. 17 December]. Directed by Stanislavski and Vladimir Nemirovich-Danchenko. Cast included Stanislavski as Trigorin and Vsevolod Meyerhold as Konstantin, Olga Knipper as Arkadnia, Maria Lilina as Masha, Maria Roksanova as Nina, Yevgeniya Raevskaya as Polina, Ioasaf Tikhomirov as Medvedenko, Vasily Luzhsky as Sorin, Alexander Vishnevsky as Dorn, and Alexander Artem as Shamrayev. The production ran for 57 performances in the 1898—99 season, 13 in the next, and 9 in the 1900—01 season. Chekhov disliked Roksanova's performance so intensely that he demanded that she should never be allowed to act in his plays again. For more information on this production, see the article on the MAT production of The Seagull.
- 1899: Hedda Gabler by Henrik Ibsen. Opened on 3 March [O.S. 19 February]. Scenic design by Viktor Simov. Cast included Stanislavski as Løvborg, Maria Samarova as Aunt Julia and Maria Andreyeva as Hedda. It played for only eleven performances. Reflecting on the production years later, the critic Nikolai Efros regarded Stanislavski's performance as the best of an Ibsen character he had seen.

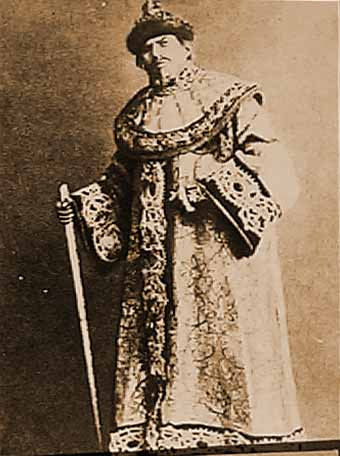
Vsevolod Meyerhold as Tsar Ivan in Stanislavski's production of The Death of Ivan the Terrible at the Moscow Art Theatre.

- 1899: The Death of Ivan the Terrible by Alexei Tolstoy. Opened on 11 October [O.S. 29 September]. Scenic design by Viktor Simov. Cast included Alexander Vishnevsky as Boris Godunov, Margarita Savitskaya as Tsaritsa Maria and Anna Aleeva-Shteker as Maria Godunov. Stanislavski initially played Ivan, though Vsevolod Meyerhold took over the part after a few performances when Stanislavski became unwell.
- 1899: Twelfth Night by William Shakespeare. Revival of Stanislavski's Society of Art and Literature production from two years earlier. Opened on 15 October [O.S. 3 October]. Scenic design by Viktor Simov. In this production, Vsevolod Meyerhold played Malvolio, Olga Knipper played Viola, Maria Andreyeva played Olivia, and Vasily Luzhsky played Sir Toby.
- 1899: Drayman Henschel by Gerhart Hauptmann. Opened on 17 October [O.S. 5 October]. Scenic design by Viktor Simov. Cast included both Anna Aleeva-Shteker and Maria Roksanova as Hanna, as well as Ekaterina Munt as Franziska Wermelskirch. The play's title has also been translated as The Driver Henschel. Anna Alekseieva-Shteker was Stanislavski's sister, who used the stage name of Anna Aleeva-Shteker; see Benedetti (1991, 51) and the article on her on the Russian-language Wikipedia.

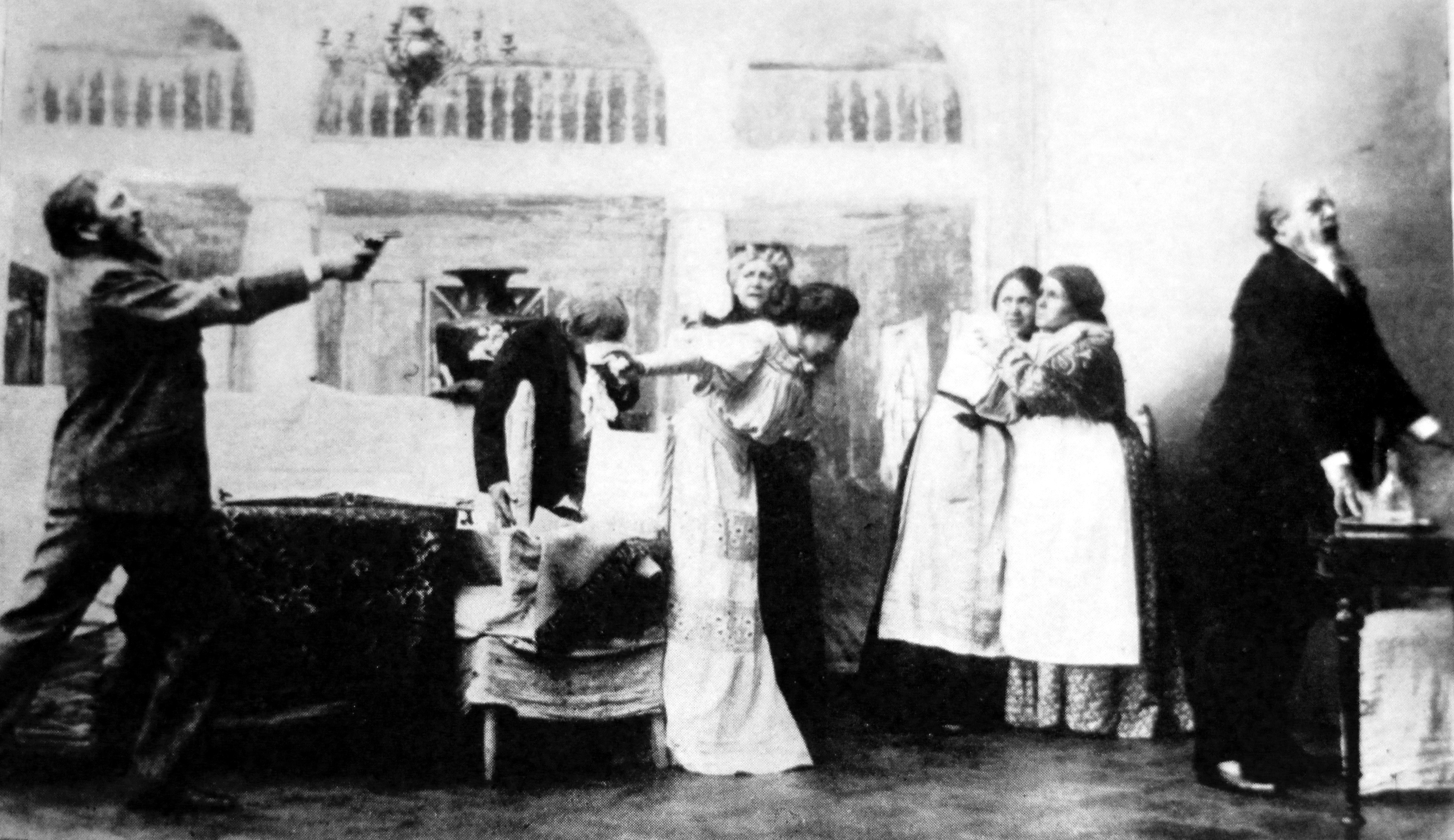
Armed with a revolver, Vanya (Alexander Vishnevsky) confronts Professor Serebriakov (Vasily Luzhsky) at the end of act three of Anton Chekhov's Uncle Vanya (1899) at the Moscow Art Theatre.

- 1899: Uncle Vanya by Anton Chekhov. Opened on 7 November [O.S. 26 October]. Scenic design by Viktor Simov. Cast included Alexander Vishnevsky as Vanya, Vasily Luzhsky as Professor Serebriakov, Olga Knipper as Yeliena, Maria Lilina as Sonia, Alexander Artem as Telyeghin, Maria Samarova as Marina, and Stanislavski as Astrov. The Grand Duke Sergey Alexandrovich and his wife, Princess Elizaveta Fedorovna, along with Konstantin Pobedonostsev (the reactionary Ober-Procurator of the Most Holy Synod), saw the tenth performance of the play and were greatly impressed. Leo Tolstoy saw the production on 6 February [O.S. 24 January] 1900.
- 1899: Lonely People by Gerhart Hauptmann. Opened on 28 December [O.S. 16 December]. Scenic design by Viktor Simov. Vsevolod Meyerhold played Johannes Vockerat until he left the company, after which Vasily Kachalov took over the role. Cast included also Maria Samarova as Frau Vockerat. This production was the play's première in Russia.
- 1900: Snow Maiden by Alexander Ostrovsky. Opened on 7 October [O.S. 24 September]. Scenic design by Viktor Simov. Cast included Vasily Kachalov as Tsar Berendey (his first performance at the MAT), Ekaterina Munt as the Snow Maiden, Anna Aleeva-Shteker as Elena the Fair, Maria Samarova as Bobylikha, Maria Roksanova as Kupava, Margarita Savitskaya as the Spring, Olga Knipper, Ivan Moskvin, Alexander Vishnevsky, Vladimir Gribunin, and . When the MAT production opened, four other productions of Ostrovsky's play also were playing in Moscow.
- 1900: An Enemy of the People by Henrik Ibsen. Opened on 6 November [O.S. 24 October]. Scenic design by Viktor Simov. Cast included Stanislavski as Dr Stockmann and Alexander Vishnevsky as Hovstad.
- 1901: Three Sisters by Anton Chekhov. Opened on 13 February [O.S. 31 January]. Scenic design by Viktor Simov. Cast included Stanislavski as Vershinin, Olga Knipper as Masha, Maria Andreyeva as Irina, Vsevolod Meyerhold as Tusenback, Maria Samarova as Anfisa and Alexander Vishnevsky as Kulygin. This became the most popular of the MAT's productions of Chekhov's plays, remaining part of the company's repertoire for the next 18 years.
- 1901: The Wild Duck by Henrik Ibsen. Opened on 2 October [O.S. 19 September]. Directed by Stanislavski and Alexander Sanin. Scenic design by Viktor Simov. The production played for no more than 16 performances.
- 1901: Michael Kramer by Gerhart Hauptmann. Opened on 9 November [O.S. 27 October]. Scenic design by Viktor Simov. Cast included Maria Andreyeva as Michaelina Kramer, Stanislavski as Michael Kramer, and Ivan Moskvin as his son, Arnold. It played for twenty-six performances.
- 1901—2: In Dreams by Vladimir Nemirovich-Danchenko. Opened on 3 January 1902 [O.S. 21 December 1901]. Scenic design by Viktor Simov. Cast included Maria Andreyeva as Vera Kirillovna, Maria Samarova as Zankovskaya, Ekaterina Munt as m-lle Solntseva and Stanislavski as Kostromskoy. It played for thirty-eight performances. This was the last of the MAT's productions presented at the Hermitage Theatre on Carriage Row.
- 1902: The Philistines by Maxim Gorky. Opened on 8 April [O.S. 26 March] in St Petersburg, while the MAT were on tour. Scenic design by Viktor Simov. Cast included Nikolai Baranov as Teterev, Vasily Luzhsky as Bessemenov, Elena Muratova as Akulina Ivanovna and Vsevolod Meyerhold as Peter (until he left the company after the St Petersburg performances). Its Moscow première inaugurated the MAT's new building (in the renovated Lianozov Theatre, also known as the Omon Theatre, on Chamberlain Lane, Tverskoy District) on 6 November [O.S. 25 October]. The production played for a total of twenty-seven performances.
- 1902: The Power of Darkness by Leo Tolstoy. Opened on 18 November [O.S. 5 November]. Scenic design by Viktor Simov. Cast included Stanislavski as Mitrich, though he only appeared in three performances before passing on the role to another actor, and Sophia Khalyutina as Anyutka.

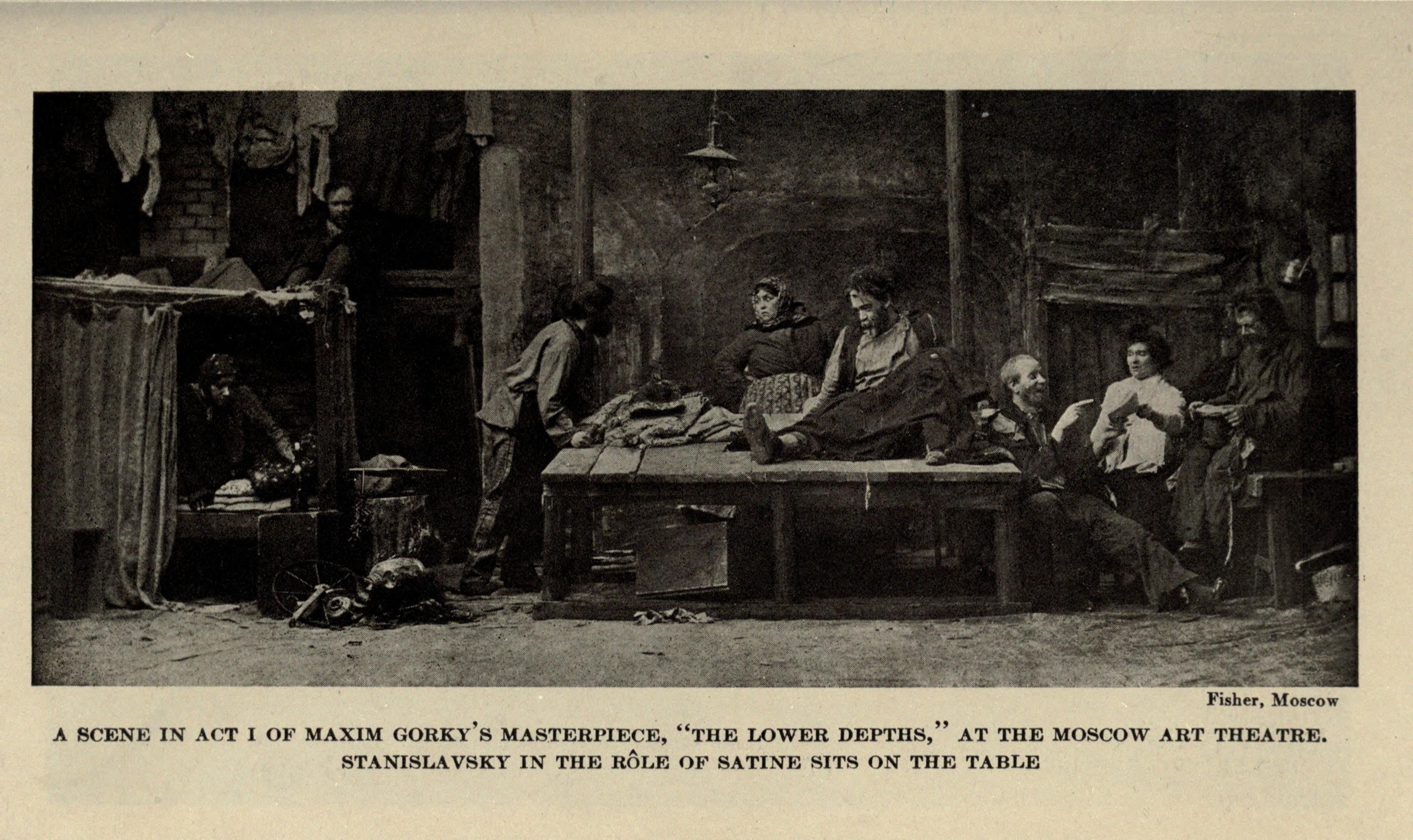
Stanislavski as Satin (seated, centre) in the Moscow Art Theatre production of Maxim Gorky's The Lower Depths.

- 1902: The Lower Depths by Maxim Gorky. Opened on 31 December [O.S. 18 December]. Directed by Stanislavski and Vladimir Nemirovich-Danchenko. Scenic design by Viktor Simov. Cast included Georgy Burdzhalov as Kostyliov, Elena Muratova as Vassilissa, Maria Andreyeva as Natasha, Vladimir Gribunin as Medvediev, Aleksei Kharlamov as Vassily Pepel, Alexander Zagarov as Kleshch, Margarita Savitskaya as Anna, Olga Knipper as Nastya, Maria Samarova as Kvashnia, Vasily Luzhsky as Bubnov, Vasili Kachalov as the Baron, Mikhail Gromov as the Actor, Ivan Moskvin as Luka, Alexander Adashev as Alyoshka, Alexander Vishnevsky as Tatar, and Nikolai Baranov as Krivoy Zob; Stanislavski played Satin for the first five performances, after which Serafim Sudbinin took over. Gorky saw the production nearly a year later, on 18 October [O.S. 5 October] 1903.

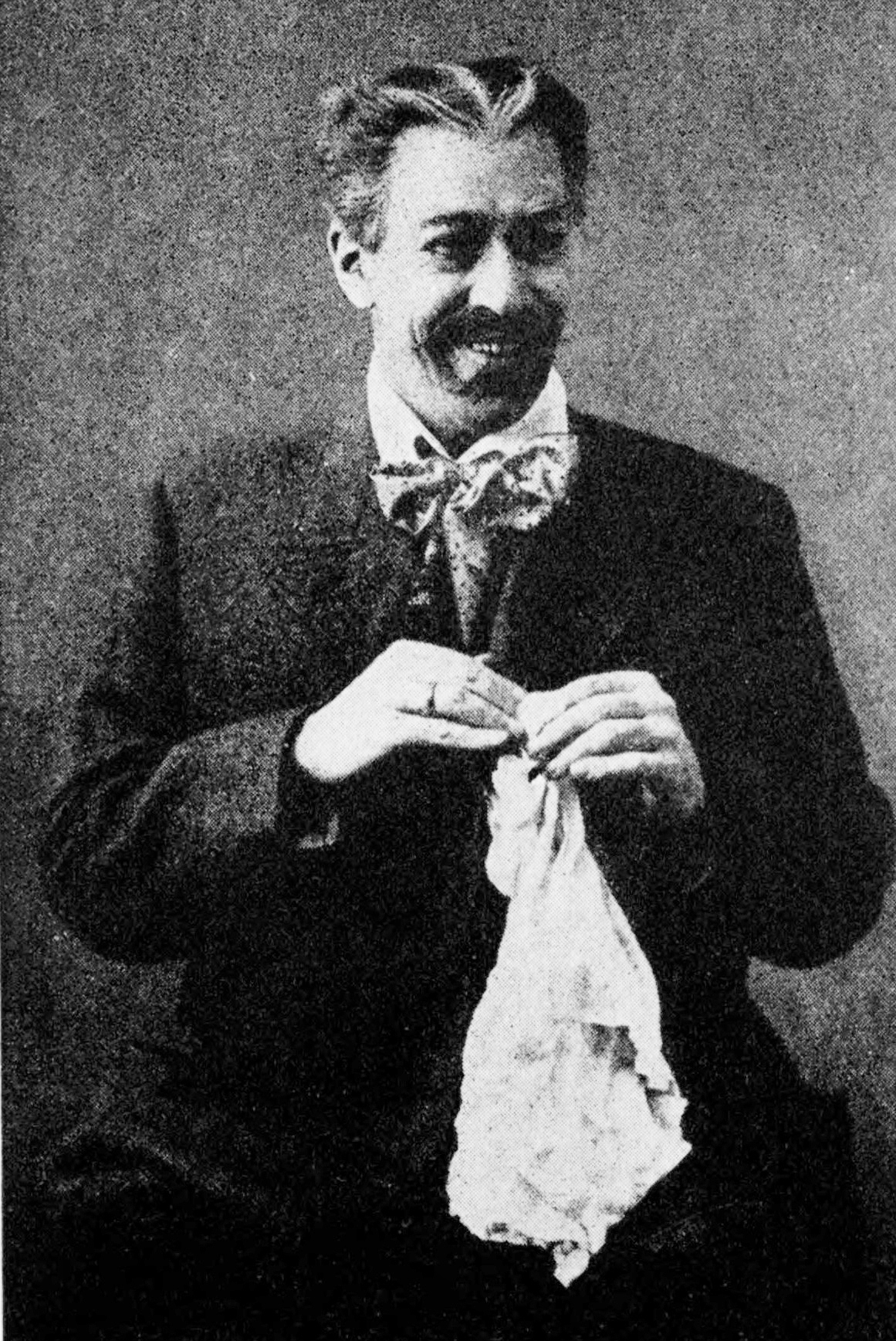
Stanislavski as Gaev in the Moscow Art Theatre production of Anton Chekhov's The Cherry Orchard.

- 1904: The Cherry Orchard by Anton Chekhov. Opened on 30 January [O.S. 17 January]. Directed by Stanislavski and Vladimir Nemirovich-Danchenko. Scenic design by Viktor Simov. Cast included Olga Knipper as Madame Ranyevskaya, Maria Lilina as Anya, Maria Andreyeva as Varya, Stanislavski as Gaev, Leonid Leonidov as Lopakhin, Vasili Kachalov as Trofimov, Elena Muratova as Charlotta, Ivan Moskvin as Yepihodov, Sofia Khaliutina as Dunyasha, Alexander Artem as Firs, Nikolai Alexandrov as Yasha, Mikhail Gromov as a passer-by, and Alexander Zagarov as the stationmaster. Chekhov's last appearance at the MAT, before his death on 15 July [O.S. 2 July], was to see the first public performance of this production, which coincided with his birthday.
- 1904: The Blind, Intruder, and Interior by Maurice Maeterlinck. Scenic design by Viktor Simov. Opened on 15 October [O.S. 2 October].
- 1904—5: Anton Chekhov evening. Opened on 3 January 1905 [O.S. 21 December 1904].
- 1905: Ghosts by Henrik Ibsen. Opened on 13 April [O.S. 31 March]. Directed by Stanislavski and Nemirovich. Scenic design by Viktor Simov. Cast included Margarita Savitskaya as Mrs Alving, Ivan Moskvin as Osvald, and Vasili Kachalov as Manders.
- 1905: Children of the Sun by Maxim Gorky. Scenic design by Viktor Simov. Opened on 6 November [O.S. 24 October].
- 1906: Woe from Wit by Aleksandr Griboyedov. Opened on 9 October [O.S. 26 September]. Scenic design by Viktor Simov. Cast included Stanislavski as Pavel Afanasyevich Famusov, Vasili Kachalov as Chatski, and Alexander Vishnevsky as Count Tugoukhovsky. Both Stanislavski and Nemirovich directed; Benedetti suggests that "Stanislavski, however, would appear to have exerted the dominant influence" whereas Worrall claims that "most of the work was done by Nemirovich, Stanislavski merely introducing minor corrections and additions to Act Three." Benedetti and Worrall also disagree as to whether the text was in prose or verse. The MAT revived the production in 1914 and 1925.
- 1907: The Drama of Life by Knut Hamsun. Opened on 21 February [O.S. 8 February]. Cast included Stanislavski as Kareno. Directed by Stanislavski with the assistance of Sulerzhitsky. Music by Ilya Satz.
- 1907: The Life of Man by Leonid Andreyev. Opened on 25 December [O.S. 12 December]. Cast included Leonid Leonidov as Man and Ilya Uralov as Someone in Grey.

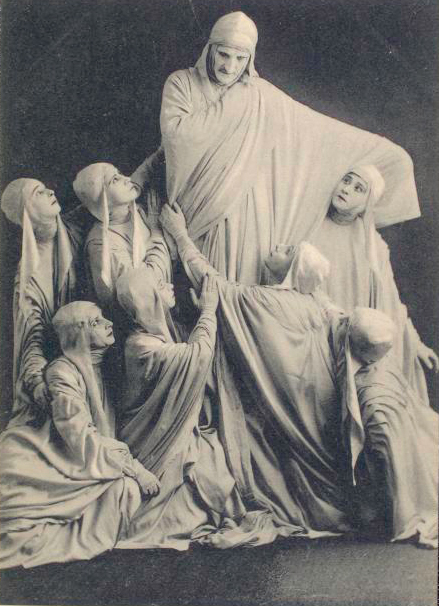
Stanislavski's production of Maurice Maeterlinck's The Blue Bird in 1908.

- 1908: The Blue Bird by Maurice Maeterlinck. Opened on 13 October [O.S. 30 September]. Cast included Alisa Koonen as Mytyl and Sofia Khalyutina as Tiltil.
- 1908: The Government Inspector by Nikolai Gogol. Opened on 31 December [O.S. 18 December]. Cast included Ilya Uralov as the Mayor.
- 1909: A Month in the Country by Ivan Turgenev. Opened on 22 December [O.S. 9 December]. Directed by Stanislavski and Ivan Moskvin. Cast included Stanislavski as Rakitin, alternating with Vasili Kachalov, Olga Knipper as Natalya, Richard Boleslavsky as Belyaev, Nikolai Massalitinov as Islayev, Maria Samarova as Anna, Lydia Koreneva as Verochka, Elena Muratova as Lizaveta, Nikolai Zvantsev as Schaaf, Ilya Uralov as Bolshintsov, Vladimir Gribunin as Shpigelsky, I. V. Lazaryev as Matvei, and Lyubov Dmitrevskaya as Katya. Scenic design by Mstislav Dobuzhinsky. This was the first production in which Stanislavski made use of his emerging 'system', much to the general distress of the actors, and Knipper in particular.
- 1910: Enough Stupidity in Every Wise Man by Alexander Ostrovsky. Opened on 24 March [O.S. 11 March]. Cast included Stanislavski as General Krutitski.
- 1911: The Living Corpse by Leo Tolstoy. Opened on 6 October [O.S. 23 September]. Principally directed by Nemirovich. Cast included Alisa Koonen as Masha, Alexey Stakhovich as Prince Abrezkov and Yevgeny Vakhtangov as the Gypsy.
- 1911—12: Hamlet by William Shakespeare. Opened on 5 January 1912 [O.S. 23 December 1911]. Cast included Vasili Kachalov as Hamlet, Nikolai Massalitinov as Claudius, Olga Knipper as Gertrude, Olga Gzovskaya as Ophelia, and Yevgeny Vakhtangov as the actor-queen. See the article on the MAT's production of Hamlet.
- 1912: A Provincial Lady by Ivan Turgenev. Opened on 18 March [O.S. 5 March] as part of a triple bill of plays by Turgenev. Cast included Stanislavski as Count Liubin. Scenic design by Mstislav Dobuzhinsky.

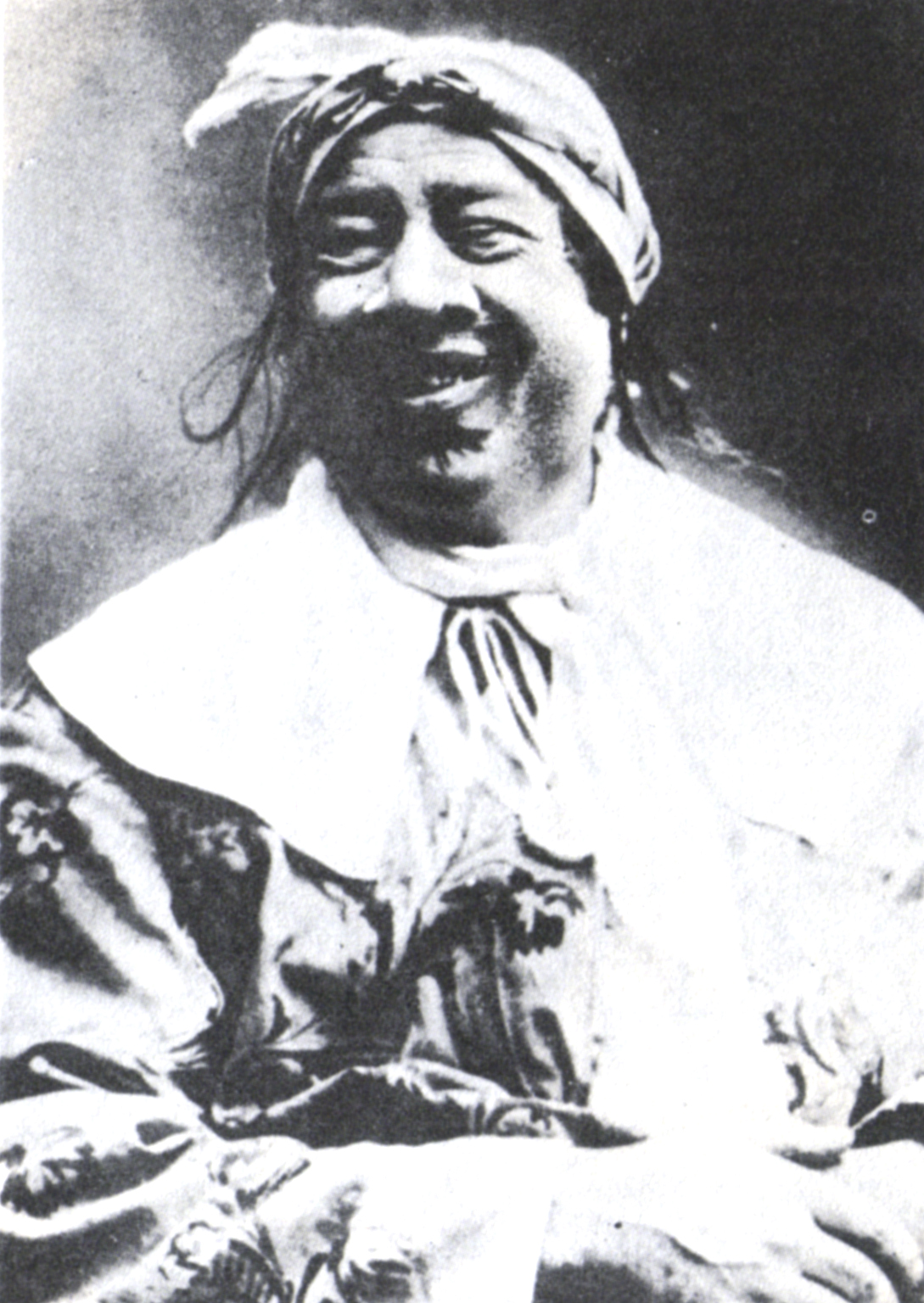
Stanislavski as Argan in Molière's The Imaginary Invalid.

- 1913: The Imaginary Invalid by Molière. Opened on 9 April [O.S. 27 March]. Cast included Stanislavski as Argan and his Maria Lilina as Toinette. Scenic design by Alexandre Benois. Rehearsals conducted at the First Studio as a demonstration of Stanislavski's 'system'.
- 1914: The Mistress of the Inn by Carlo Goldoni. Opened on 16 February [O.S. 3 February] after 112 rehearsals. Cast included Stanislavski as Count Ripafratta. Scenic design by Alexandre Benois. The production was conceived as a showcase for Olga Gzovskaya.
- 1915: A Feast in Time of Plague and Mozart and Salieri by Alexander Pushkin. Opened on 8 April [O.S. 26 March]. Cast included Stanislavski as Salieri. Scenic design by Alexandre Benois.
- 1916: The Green Ring by Zinaida Gippius, performed by the Second Studio. Directed by Vakhtang Mchedelov, with final rehearsals taken by Stanislavski. Opened on 7 December [O.S. 24 November]. Cast included Alexey Stakhovich as Uncle Mika and Alla Tarasova as Finochka.
- 1917—18: Twelfth Night by William Shakespeare, in a translation by Pyotr Veinberg, performed by the First Studio. Directed by Boris Sushkevich, under the supervision of Stanislavski. Opened on 7 January 1918 [O.S. 25 December 1917]. Scenic design by André Andrejew, with music by N. N. Rakhmanov. After seeing a work-in-progress showing, Stanislavski took over the direction and "rebuilt the production stone by stone". Recommending the production to Vladimir Lenin, Anatoly Lunacharsky praised it as the best in Moscow.
- 1920: Cain by Byron. Opened on 4 April. Cast included Leonid Leonidov as Cain and Alexander Shakhalov as Lucifer. Scenic design by Nikolay Andreyev.
- 1921: The Government Inspector by Nikolai Gogol. Opened on 2 October. Cast included Michael Chekhov as Khlestakov.
- 1926: An Ardent Heart by Alexander Ostrovsky. Opened on 23 January.
- 1926: Nicholas I and the Decembrists by Aleksandr Kugel. Opened on 18 May. Cast included Vasily Kachalov as Nicholas I, Leonid Leonidov as a protagonist and Nikolai Podgorny as Pavel Pestel.
- 1926: Merchants of Glory by Marcel Pagnol and Paul Nivoix. Opened on 15 June.
- 1926: The Days of the Turbins by Mikhail Bulgakov (adapted from his novel The White Guard). Opened on 5 October. Cast included Nikolai Khmelyov as Alexey Turbin and Boris Dobronravov as Myshlayevsky.
- 1927: The Marriage of Figaro by Pierre Beaumarchais. Opened 28 April. Scenic design by Aleksandr Golovin.
- 1927: The Gérard Sisters (The Two Orphans) by Adolphe d'Ennery and Eugène Cormon. Opened on 29 October.

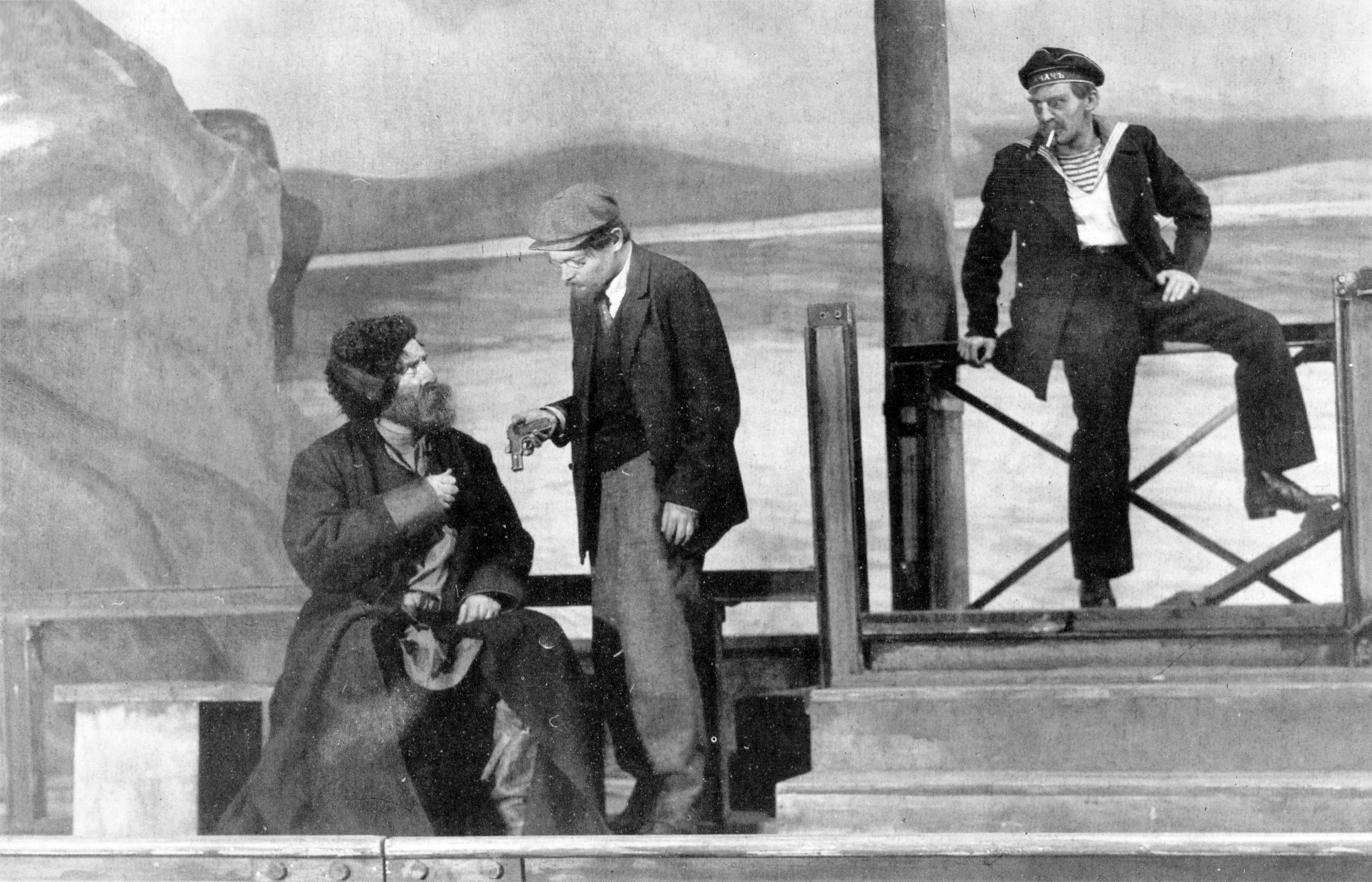
Stanislavski's production of Armoured Train 14-69 (1927) by Vsevolod Ivanov.

- 1927: Armoured Train 14-69 by Vsevolod Ivanov. Opened 8 November. Cast included Olga Knipper as Nadezhda Lvovna and Vasili Kachalov as Vershinin. Scenic design by Viktor Simov.
- 1928: Untilovsk by Leonid Leonov. Opened on 17 February.
- 1928: The Embezzlers by Valentin Kataev. Opened on 20 April. Cast included Mikhail Tarkhanov as Prokhorov, Vasily Toporkov as Vanechka and Nikolai Batalov as Nikita.
- 1930: Othello by William Shakespeare. Opened 14 March. Cast included Leonid Leonidov as Othello.
- 1932: Dead Souls by Nikolai Gogol, adapted by Mikhail Bulgakov. Opened on 28 November. Scenic design by Viktor Simov.
- 1933: Talents and Admirers by Alexander Ostrovsky. Opened on 14 June.
- 1933: The Barber of Seville by Gioachino Rossini. Opened on 26 October.
- 1935: Carmen by Georges Bizet. Opened on 4 April.
- 1936: Molière (also known as The Cabal of Hypocrites) by Mikhail Bulgakov. Opened on 11 February.
- 1936: Don Pasquale by Gaetano Donizetti. Opened on 22 May.

== Opera Studio productions ==
- 1921: Nikolai Rimsky-Korsakov evening. Opened on 9 June. Presented at the MAT.
- 1921: Alexander Pushkin musical evening. Opened on 14 July. Presented at the MAT for six performances.
- 1921: Werther by Jules Massenet. Opened on 2 August.
- 1922: Eugene Onegin by Pyotr Ilyich Tchaikovsky. Opened on 15 June. Cast included Pavel Rumiantsev as Onegin. Staged in the ballroom of Stanislavski's house on Leontievski Lane (which was known thereafter as the Onegin Room), with minimal set and no costumes or make-up. With a full orchestra the production transferred two years later to the Novi Teatr.
- 1926: The Secret Marriage by Domenico Cimarosa. Opened on 5 April.
- 1926: The Tsar's Bride by Nikolai Rimsky-Korsakov. Opened on 28 November.
- 1927: La bohème by Giacomo Puccini. Opened on 12 April.
- 1928: May Night by Nikolai Rimsky-Korsakov. Opened on 19 January.
- 1928: Boris Godunov by Modest Mussorgsky. Opened on 5 March.
- 1930: The Queen of Spades by Pyotr Ilyich Tchaikovsky. Opened on 26 February.
- 1932: The Golden Cockerel by Nikolai Rimsky-Korsakov. Opened on 4 May.

== Posthumous productions completed by others ==
- 1939: Rigoletto by Giuseppe Verdi, production completed by Vsevolod Meyerhold. Opened on 10 March.
- 1939: Tartuffe by Molière, production completed by Mikhail Kedrov. Opened on 4 December. Cast included Kedrov as Tartuffe and Vasily Toporkov as Orgon.

== See also ==
- The MAT production of The Seagull
- The MAT production of Hamlet

== Sources ==
- Benedetti, Jean, ed. and trans. 1991. The Moscow Art Theatre Letters. London: Routledge. ISBN 0-87830-084-8.
- Benedetti, Jean. 1999a. Stanislavski: His Life and Art. Revised edition. Original edition published in 1988. London: Methuen. ISBN 0-413-52520-1.
- Benedetti, Jean. 1999b. "Stanislavsky and the Moscow Art Theatre, 1898–1938". In Leach and Borovsky (1999, 254–277).
- Braun, Edward. 1982. The Director and the Stage: From Naturalism to Grotowski. London: Methuen. ISBN 0-413-46300-1.
- Braun, Edward. 1988. Introduction. In Plays: 1. By Maxim Gorky. Methuen World Classics ser. London: Methuen. xv-xxxii. ISBN 0-413-18110-3.
- Braun, Edward. 1995. Meyerhold: A Revolution in Theatre. Rev. 2nd ed. London: Methuen. ISBN 0-413-72730-0.
- Carnicke, Sharon M. 1998. Stanislavsky in Focus. Russian Theatre Archive Ser. London: Harwood Academic Publishers. ISBN 90-5755-070-9.
- Gauss, Rebecca B. 1999. Lear's Daughters: The Studios of the Moscow Art Theatre 1905–1927. American University Studies ser. 26 Theatre Arts, vol. 29. New York: Peter Lang. ISBN 0-8204-4155-4.
- Gottlieb, Vera, ed. and trans. 2005. Anton Chekhov at the Moscow Art Theatre: Archive Illustrations of the Original Productions. London: Routledge. ISBN 0-415-34440-9. Reproduction of original journal ed. Nikolai Efros, published in Moscow, 1914.
- Innes, Christopher, ed. 2000. A Sourcebook on Naturalist Theatre. London and New York: Routledge. ISBN 0-415-15229-1.
- Leach, Robert. 1989. Vsevolod Meyerhold. Directors in Perspective ser. Cambridge: Cambridge University Press. ISBN 0-521-31843-2.
- Leach, Robert. 2004. Makers of Modern Theatre: An Introduction. London: Routledge. ISBN 0-415-31241-8.
- Leach, Robert, and Victor Borovsky, eds. 1999. A History of Russian Theatre. Cambridge: Cambridge UP. ISBN 0-521-43220-0.
- Magarshack, David. 1950. Stanislavsky: A Life. London and Boston: Faber, 1986. ISBN 0-571-13791-1.
- Marker, Frederick J., and Lise-Lone Marker. 1989. Ibsen's Lively Art: A Performance Study of the Major Plays. Cambridge: Cambridge UP. ISBN 0-521-61924-6.
- Marsh, Cynthia, ed. 1993. File on Gorky. Writer-Files ser. London: Methuen. ISBN 978-0-413-65060-3.
- Rudnitsky, Konstantin. 1988. Russian and Soviet Theatre: Tradition and the Avant-Garde. Trans. Roxane Permar. Ed. Lesley Milne. London: Thames and Hudson. Rpt. as Russian and Soviet Theater, 1905–1932. New York: Abrams. ISBN 0-500-28195-5.
- Senelick, Laurence, ed. and trans. 2013. Stanislavsky—A Life in Letters: The Missionary in the Theatre. Abingdon, Oxon: Routledge. ISBN 1-136-34341-5.
- Solovyova, Inna. 1999. "The Theatre and Socialist Realism, 1929–1953." Trans. Jean Benedetti. In Leach and Borovsky (1999, 325–357).
- Stanislavski, Constantin, and Pavel Rumyantsev. 1975. Stanislavski on Opera. Trans. Elizabeth Reynolds Hapgood. London: Routledge, 1998. ISBN 0-87830-552-1.
- Vakhtangov, Evgeny. 1982. Evgeny Vakhtangov. Compiled by Lyubov Vendrovskaya and Galina Kaptereva. Trans. Doris Bradbury. Moscow: Progress.
- Worrall, Nick. 1996. The Moscow Art Theatre. Theatre Production Studies ser. London and NY: Routledge. ISBN 0-415-05598-9.
