= Moscow Art Theatre production of The Seagull =

1898 production of a play by Anton Chekhov

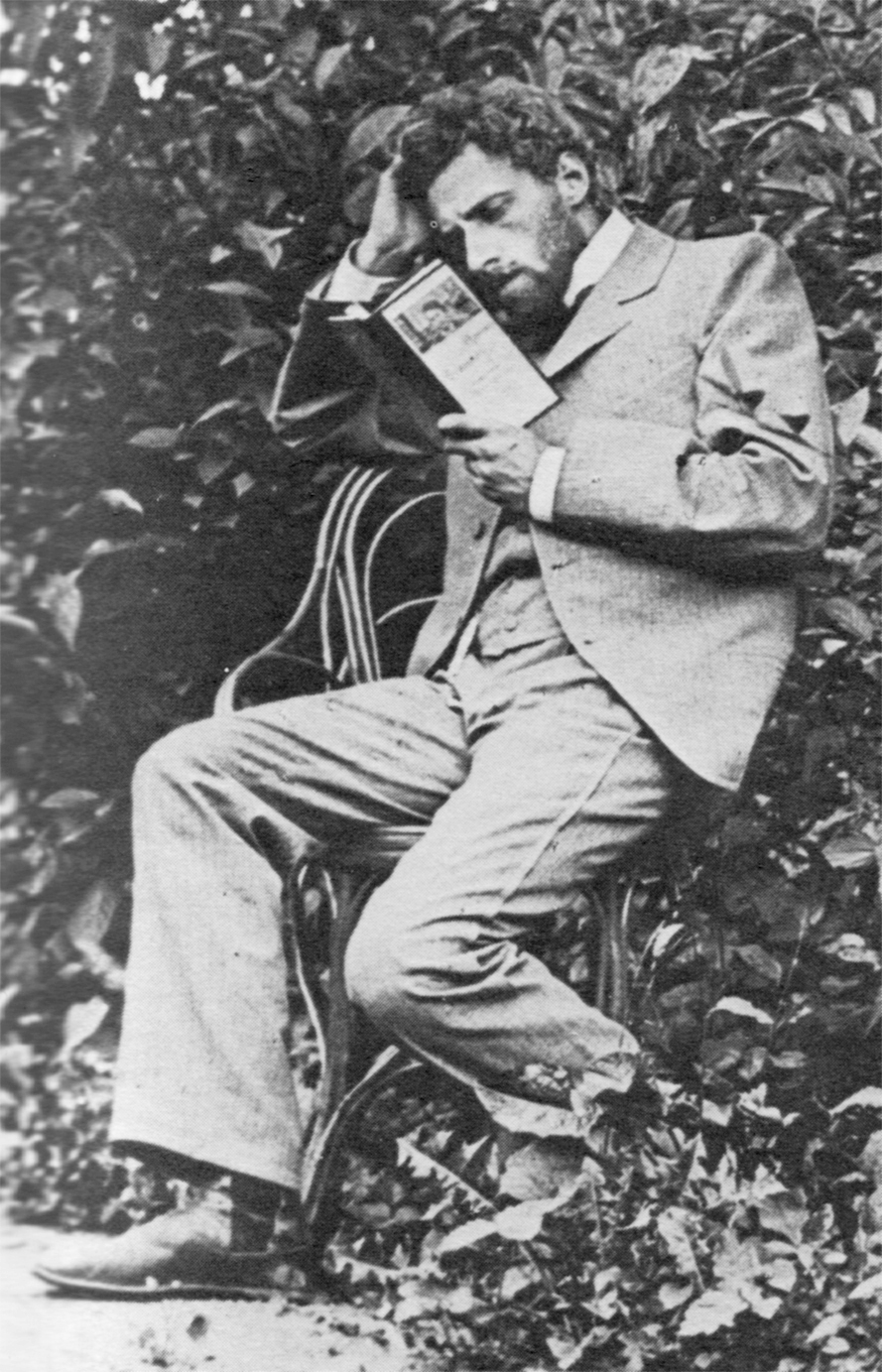
At Pushkino in 1898, Vsevolod Meyerhold prepares for his role as Konstantin in the MAT production of Anton Chekhov's The Seagull.

The Moscow Art Theatre production of The Seagull in 1898, directed by Konstantin Stanislavski and Vladimir Nemirovich-Danchenko, was a crucial milestone for the fledgling theatre company that has been described as "one of the greatest events in the history of Russian theatre and one of the greatest new developments in the history of world drama." It was the first production in Moscow of Anton Chekhov's 1896 play The Seagull, though it had been performed with only moderate success in St. Petersburg two years earlier. Nemirovich-Danchenko, who was a friend of Chekhov's, overcame the writer's refusal to allow the play to appear in Moscow after its earlier lacklustre reception and convinced Stanislavski to direct the play for their innovative and newly founded Moscow Art Theatre (MAT). The production opened on 29 December [O.S. 17 December] 1898. The MAT's success was due to the fidelity of its delicate representation of everyday life, its intimate, ensemble playing, and the resonance of its mood of despondent uncertainty with the psychological disposition of the Russian intelligentsia of the time. To commemorate this historic production, which gave the MAT its sense of identity, the company to this day bears the seagull as its emblem.

== Cast ==
- Irina Nikolayevna Arkadina: Olga Knipper
- Konstantin Gavrilovich Treplyov: Vsevolod Meyerhold
- Peter Sorin: Vasily Luzhsky
- Nina Mikhailovna Zarechnaya: Maria Roksanova
- Ilya Afanasyevich Shamrayev: Alexander Artem
- Polina Andryevna: Yevgeniya Raevskaya
- Masha: Maria Lilina
- Boris Alexeyevich Trigorin: Konstantin Stanislavski
- Yevgeny Sergeyevich Dorn: Alexander Vishnevsky
- Semyon Semyonovich Medvedenko: Ioasaf Tikhomirov

== Stanislavski's directorial conception ==
While visiting his brother's estate near Kharkiv in August 1898, Stanislavski began work on his production plan (or his directorial "score" as he came to call it) for the play, into which he incorporated his sensory experiences of the countryside there. He storyboarded key moments of the play with small drawings that gave the actor's spatial and proxemic relationships. He also detailed individual rhythms, physical lives and mannerisms for each character:

Sorin's laugh is "startling and unexpected"; Arkadina "habitually folds her arms behind her back when she is angry or excited"; Konstantin is, in general, "tense"; Masha takes snuff; Medvedenko smokes a lot. The production copy sets down every move, every gesture, exact facial expressions in almost cinematic detail.

The score indicates when the actors will "wipe away dribble, blow their noses, smack their lips, wipe away sweat, or clean their teeth and nails with matchsticks." This tight control of the mise en scène was intended to facilitate the unified expression of the inner action that Stanislavski perceived to be hidden beneath the surface of the play in its subtext. Vsevolod Meyerhold, the director and practitioner whom Stanislavski on his death-bed declared to be "my sole heir in the theatre—here or anywhere else", and the actor who played Konstantin in this production, described years later the poetic effect of Stanislavski's treatment of the play:

Probably there were individual elements of naturalism but that's not important. The important thing is that it contained the poetic nerve-centre, the hidden poetry of Chekhov's prose which was there because of Stanislavski's genius as a director. Up to Stanislavski people had only played the theme in Chekhov and forgot that in his plays the sound of the rain outside the windows, the noise of a falling tub, early morning light through the shutters, mist on the lake were indissolubly linked (as previously only in prose) with people's actions.

Stanislavski's directorial score was published in 1938.

== Production process ==
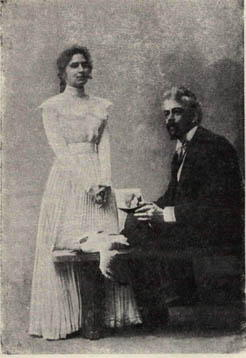
Studio portrait of Stanislavski (right) as Trigorin—"elegantly coiffured, clad in evening dress, mournfully contemplating the middle distance with pencil and notepad, suggests someone licked his chin on resurrecting the dead seagull in deathless prose than plotting the casual seduction of the ardent female by his side."

As an actor, despite wishing to play Trigorin, Stanislavski initially prepared the role of the doctor Dorn, at Nemirovich-Danchenko's insistence. When Chekhov attended rehearsals for the production in September 1898, however, he felt that the performance of Trigorin was weak, which resulted in a re-casting; Stanislavski took over Trigorin, and Nemirovich-Danchenko apologised for having kept the role from him. Olga Knipper (Chekhov's future wife) played Arkadina.

The production had 80 hours of rehearsal in total, spread over 24 sessions: 9 with Stanislavski and 15 with Nemirovich-Danchenko. Despite this, a considerable length by the standards of the conventional practice of the day, Stanislavski felt it was under-rehearsed and threatened to have his name removed from the posters when Nemirovich-Danchenko refused his demand to postpone its opening by a week.

== Performance and reception ==
The production opened on 29 December [O.S. 17 December] 1898 with a sense of crisis in the air in the theatre; most of the actors were mildly self-tranquilised with Valerian drops. In a letter to Chekhov, one audience member described how:

In the first act something special started, if you can so describe a mood of excitement in the audience that seemed to grow and grow. Most people walked through the auditorium and corridors with strange faces, looking as if it were their birthday and, indeed, (dear God I'm not joking) it was perfectly possible to go up to some completely strange woman and say: "What a play? Eh?"

Nemirovich-Danchenko described the applause, which came after a prolonged silence, as bursting from the audience like a dam breaking. The production received unanimous praise from the press.

It was not until 13 May [O.S. 1 May] 1899 that Chekhov saw the production, in a performance without sets but in make-up and costumes at the Paradiz Theatre. He praised the production but was less keen on Stanislavski's own performance; he objected to the "soft, weak-willed tone" in his interpretation (shared by Nemirovich-Danchenko) of Trigorin and entreated Nemirovich-Danchenko to "put some spunk into him or something". He proposed that the play be published with Stanislavski's score of the production's mise en scène. Chekhov's collaboration with Stanislavski proved crucial to the creative development of both men. Stanislavski's attention to psychological realism and ensemble playing coaxed the buried subtleties from the play and revived Chekhov's interest in writing for the stage. Chekhov's unwillingness to explain or expand on the script forced Stanislavski to dig beneath the surface of the text in ways that were new in theatre.

== See also ==
- Moscow Art Theatre
- The Seagull
- Moscow Art Theatre production of Hamlet

== Sources ==
- Allen, David. 2001. Performing Chekhov. London: Routledge. ISBN 0-415-18935-7.
- Balukhaty, Sergei Dimitrievich, ed. The Seagull Produced By Stanislavsky. Trans. David Magarshack. London: Denis Dobson. New York: Theatre Arts Books.
- Banham, Martin, ed. 1998. The Cambridge Guide to Theatre. Cambridge: Cambridge UP. ISBN 0-521-43437-8.
- Benedetti, Jean. 1989. Stanislavski: An Introduction. Revised edition. Original edition published in 1982. London: Methuen. ISBN 0-413-50030-6.
- ---. 1999. Stanislavski: His Life and Art. Revised edition. Original edition published in 1988. London: Methuen. ISBN 0-413-52520-1.
- Braun, Edward. 1982. "Stanislavsky and Chekhov". The Director and the Stage: From Naturalism to Grotowski. London: Methuen. p. 59-76. ISBN 0-413-46300-1.
- Chekhov, Anton. 1920. Letters of Anton Chekhov to His Family and Friends with Biographical Sketch. Trans. Constance Garnett. New York: Macmillan. Full text available online at Gutenberg
- Golub, Spencer. 1998. "Stanislavsky, Konstantin (Sergeevich)." In Banham (1998, 1032-1033).
- Rudnitsky, Konstantin. 1981. Meyerhold the Director. Trans. George Petrov. Ed. Sydney Schultze. Revised translation of Rezhisser Meierkhol'd. Moscow: Academy of Sciences, 1969. ISBN 0-88233-313-5.
- Worrall, Nick. 1996. The Moscow Art Theatre. Theatre Production Studies ser. London and NY: Routledge. ISBN 0-415-05598-9.
