= Ekaterina Munt =

Russian actor (1875–1954)

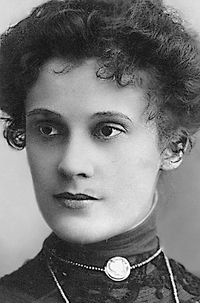
- Born: Yekaterina Mikhaylovna Munt; Екатерина Михайловна Мунт; 5 March 1875; Saratov Governorate, Russian Empire
- Died: 12 February 1954 (aged 78); Leningrad, Soviet Union
- Occupation: stage actress

Ekaterina Mikhaylovna Munt (Russian: Екатерина Михайловна Мунт; 5 March 1875 in the village Lopatino, Saratov Governorate, Imperial Russia – 12 February 1954 in Leningrad, Soviet Union) was a Russian stage actress, associated with the Moscow Art Theatre.

== Biography ==
A Philharmonic Institute graduate who studied in the class of Vladimir Nemirovich-Danchenko, Munt was one of the founding members of the original Stanislavski troupe. She was the original performer of the First Elf (The Sunken Bell by Gerhart Hauptmann), Franziska Wermelskirch (Drayman Henschel, Hauptmann), Ejlif (Doctor Stockmann, based on An Enemy of the People by Henrick Ibsen), m-lle Solntseva (In Dreams, Vladimir Nemirovich-Danchenko).

After leaving MAT in 1902 (along with Vsevolod Meyerkhold), Munt worked in Kherson and Tiflis, before joining the Komissarzhevskaya Theatre in 1906. In 1906 she went again to the Russian province. In 1920 she moved to Petrograd to become a member of the People's Palace troupe. In 1932 Ekaterina Munt was designated as a Meritorious Artist of RSFSR.
