= Maria Roksanova =

Russian stage actress

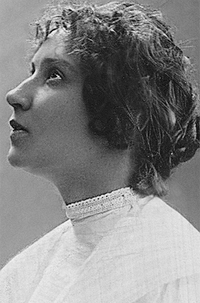
- Born: Maria Lyudomirovna Petrovskaya; Мария Людомировна Петровская; 4 May 1874; Moscow, Russian Empire
- Died: 11 January 1958 (aged 83); Moscow, Soviet Union
- Occupation: Stage actress

Maria Lyudomirovna Petrovskaya (Russian: Мария Людомировна Петровская; 4 May 1874 – 11 January 1958) was a Russian stage actress associated with the Moscow Art Theatre, better known under her stage name Roksanova (Роксанова).

A Nemirovich-Danchenko student at the Philharmonic Institute, Roksanova started out at the Vilno-based Konstantin Nezlobin's enterprise, then performed in Odessa for a while for the Solovtsov group. She then joined MAT in 1898, invited by Stanislavski who'd seen saw her performance in August 1897 in one of the Moscow region theatres. During the first season she played Princess Mstislavskaya in Tsar Fyodor Ioannovich and Ismene in Antigone so great hopes were pinned on her as Nina Zarechnaya in The Seagull which seemed to be a part she was born for. But not long before that Nemirovich-Danchenko's production of Greta's Happiness, with her in the lead, dismally flopped. Roksanova, thrown off her balance, gave a flawed performance as Nina. Adding to her trouble was that, according to Nemirovich-Danchenko, she had been disoriented by Stanislavsky's views of the interpretation of the part which contradicted his own one.

Chekhov, with uncharacteristic harshness, demanded that some other actress should substitute Roksanova in his play. The role remained hers, but the damage done to her stage integrity proved to be irrevocable, according to theatre historian Inna Solovyova. Roksanova played Hanne in Drayman Henschel, Kupava in The Snow Maiden and Tatyana in Maxim Gorky's The Philistines to some acclaim, but decided to leave the theatre in 1902, to join Vsevolod Meyerkhold's New Drama. Later she moved to Saint Petersburg's New Theatre, then, with her husband, the actor N.N. Mikhaylovsky, to Riga. In 1923 Roksanova returned to MAT and up until 1927 worked for the theatre's Fourth Studio. Later in the decade, she emigrated, but before the War returned to USSR and joined the Chamber Theatre (Камерный театр). She died in 1958 in the Old Actor's House in Moscow.
