= Margarita Savitskaya =

Russian stage actress

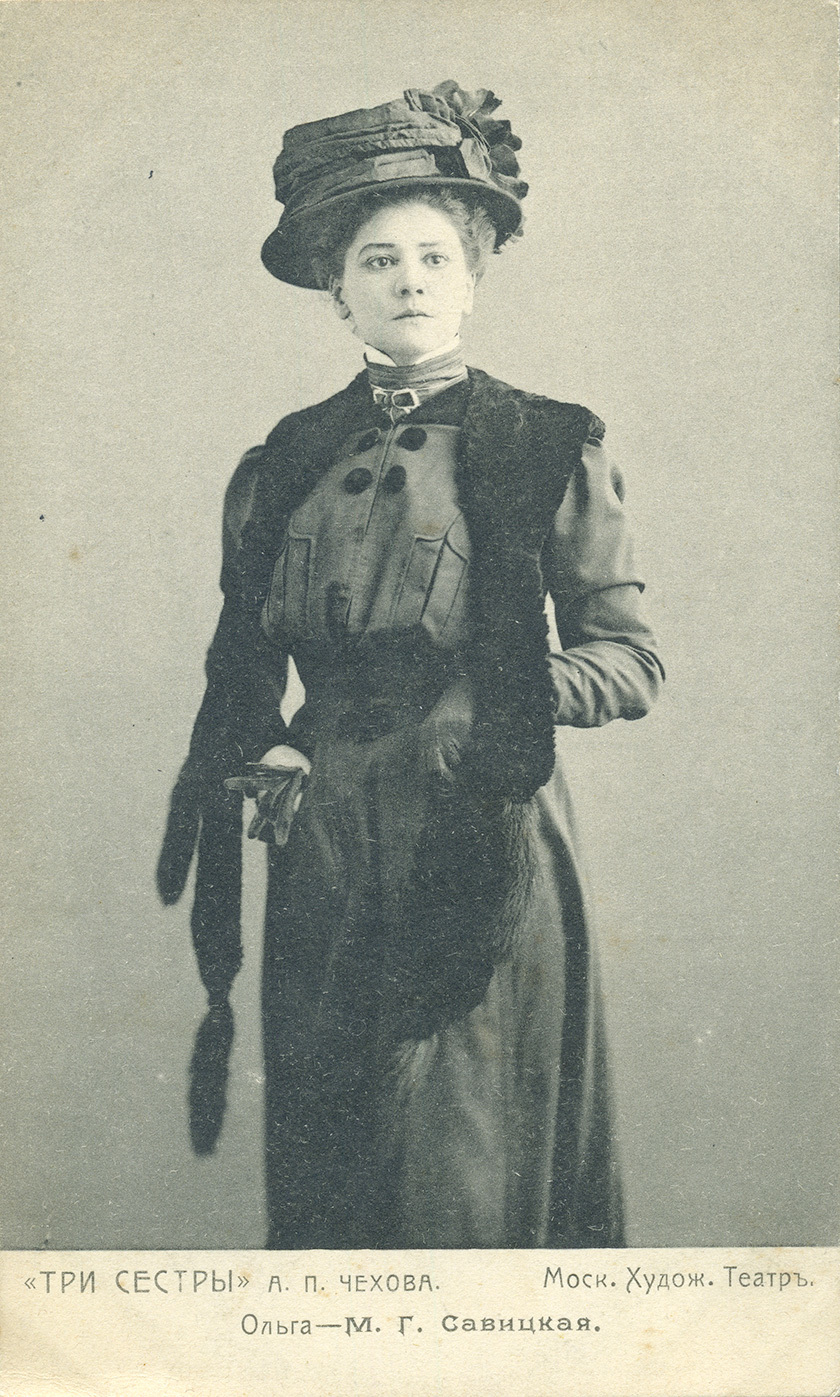
- Savitskaya in Chekhov's Three Sisters
- Born: Margarita Georgiyevna Savitskaya; Маргарита Георгиевна Савицкая; 30 October 1868; Semyonov, Russian Empire
- Died: 27 March 1911 (aged 42); Moscow
- Occupation: Stage actress

Margarita Georgiyevna Savitskaya (Russian: Маргари́та Гео́ргиевна Сави́цкая, born 30 October 1868, — died 27 March 1911) was a stage actress and in her later years a reader in drama, associated with the Moscow Art Theatre (MAT), a founding member of the original Stanislavski troupe. She was from the Russian Empire.

== Career ==
Among the parts she was the first performer of in MAT were Antigona in the Sophocles' tragedy, Magda in The Sunken Bell by Gerhart Hauptmann, Tsaritsa Maria in The Death of Ivan the Terrible by Alexey K. Tolstoy, Anna in The Lower Depths by Maxim Gorky, The Spring in Alexander Ostrovsky's Snow Maiden. Her performance as Olga in Chekhov's Three Sisters has been described (by theatre historian Inna Solovyova) as "outstanding" and earned praise from Maria Ermolova who became her close friend in late 1900s. Savitskaya, who died in 1911, has been described as "the symbol of the original MAT's ethics". She was interred in the Novodevichy Cemetery, next to the Chekhov monument.

Georgy Burdzhalov of The Moscow Art Theatre was her husband.
