= Georgy Burdzhalov =

Armenian actor (1869–1924)

- Born: Georgy Sergeyevich Burdzhalov; Георгий Сергеевич Бурджалов; 14 April 1869; Astrakhan, Russian Empire
- Died: 10 December 1924 (aged 55); Moscow, Soviet Union
- Occupations: stage actor, theatre director, MAT administrator

Georgy Sergeyevich Burdzhalov (Russian: Георгий Сергеевич Бурджалов, born Бурджалян, Бурджалян; 14 April 1869, Astrakhan, Russian Empire – 10 December 1924, Moscow, Soviet Union) was an Armenian Russian stage actor and theatre director, associated with Moscow Art Theatre, where he played, in all, 38 parts, including the acclaimed Mikhaylo Golovin (Tsar Fyodor Ioannovich, A.K. Tolstoy, 1898), The Wood Demon (The Sunken Bell, Gerhart Hauptmann, 1898), Launcelot Gobbo (The Merchant of Venice, William Shakespeare, 1898), Kadushkin (Men Above the Law, Alexey Pisemsky, 1898), Tatishchev (The Death of Ivan the Terrible, A.K. Tolstoy, 1899).

== Life ==
Konstantin Stanislavski praised Burdzhalov for his artistic gifts, but, first and foremost, "for his energy, willingness to help with resolving whatever technical difficulties would come our way," as well as "crystal clear, touchingly tender attitude to his art," according to the biographer Inna Solovyova. In 1921 Burdzhalov became the head of MAT's Fourth Studio. In 1922 he co-founded (with P.A. Podobed) the Moscow Art Theatre Museum. He authored one book, On the Artist (Об артисте, Teatr Publishers, 1914).

A one-time prominent Moscow Art Theatre actress Margarita Savitskaya was his wife. The film and theatre director Arkady Burdzhalyan (1879–1946) was his brother.
