= Vladimir Gribunin =

Russian actor (1873–1933)

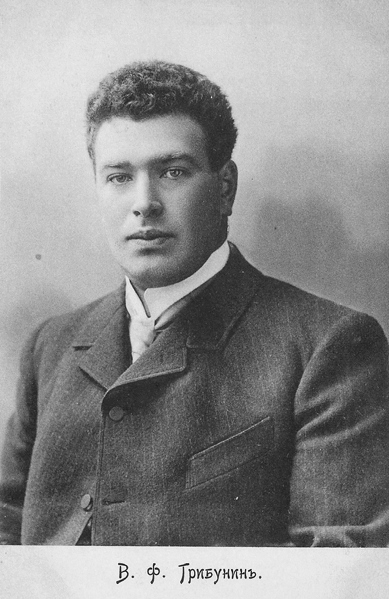
- Born: Vladimir Fyodorovich Gribunin; April 16, 1873; Lukh, Kostroma Governorate, Russian Empire
- Died: April 1, 1933 (aged 59); Moscow, USSR
- Occupation: Actor
- Years active: 1898–1933
- Spouse: Vera Pashennaya

Vladimir Fyodorovich Gribunin (Russian: Владимир Фёдорович Грибунин, 16 April [O.S. 4 April] 1873, Lukh – 1 April 1933, Moscow) was a Russian stage actor active in both the Russian Empire and later the Soviet Union.

He learned drama at the Maly Theatre Drama college in the class of Mikhail Sadovsky, then joined the Moscow Art Theatre in 1898 with which he stayed until his death in 1933. Critically lauded were his performances as Nikita (in Leo Tolstoy's Power of Darkness), Simeonov-Pishchik (Anton Chekhov's The Cherry Orchard) and Kuroslepov in the 1926 production of Alexander Ostrovsky's An Ardent Heart, the latter considered to be the high point of his artistic career. He was cast in three early Soviet films: Alyosha's Pipe (Алёшина дудка, 1919), Threesome (Трое, 1919) and Limping Landlord (Хромой барин, 1920).

"Never rivaling Stanislavski, Moskvin, Kachalov or Leonidov in terms of the scope of artistic gift or influence in the theatre, he accepted his destiny with dignity and enjoyed an artistic life that was happy in its own way, at least undistorted," the biographer I. Solovyova argued. A highly original, carefree character, he was still, in a way, indispensable. At the outset of the Russo-Japanese War, as the danger of losing actors to the army became real, Vladimir Nemirovich-Danchenko wrote in a June 1904 letter to Stanislavski: "Only Gribunin would be greatly missed, none of the others would take away from our theatre's aroma and charisma."

In 1925 he was awarded the title the Honored Artist of the RSFSR, and in 1933 the Honoured Worker of the Arts Industry of the RSFSR. The actress Vera Pashennaya was his wife.
