= Maria Samarova =

Actor

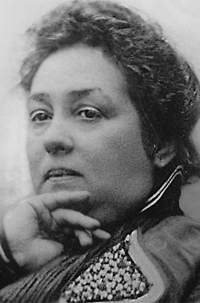
- Born: Maria Alexandrovna Samarova; Мария Александровна Самарова; 2 April 1852; Moscow, Russian Empire
- Died: 31 May 1919 (aged 67); Moscow, Soviet Russia
- Occupations: stage actress, drama teacher

Maria Alexandrovna Samarova (Russian: Мария Александровна Самарова, Grekova in marriage; 2 April 1852 – 31 May 1919) was a Moscow-born Russian Empire and Soviet stage actress and reader in drama (later a costume salon owner), associated with the Moscow Art Theatre.

An Ivan Samarin's drama class graduate, Samarova started acting at the Shakespearean and Art and Literature Societies. In 1898 she became a founder member of the original Stanislavski troupe and had in the MAT 21 parts, most of which she was the first performer of. Among her most acclaimed works were Volokhova (Tsar Fyodor Ioannovich by Alexey K. Tolstoy), Aunt Julia (Hedda Gabler by Henrik Ibsen), Marina (Uncle Vanya by Anton Chekhov), Frau Vockerat (Lonely People, after Einsame Menschen by Gerhart Hauptmann), Bobylikha (The Snow Maiden by Alexander Ostrovsky), Zankovskaya (In Dreams by Vladimir Nemirovich-Danchenko), Anfisa (Three Sisters by Chekhov), Kvashnya (The Lower Depths by Maxim Gorky), Zinaida Savishna (Ivanov by Chekhov), Khlyostova (Woe from Wit by Aleksandr Griboyedov), Islayeva (A Month in the Country by Ivan Turgenev), Glumova (Enough Stupidity in Every Wise Man by Alexander Ostrovsky).

"A.M. Samarova: in her early years a charming, slender, piquant young lady, later in her life, an overweight, venerable grand dame, extremely bold in her approach to her heroines, whom she always treated brilliantly, intelligently and with great wit... There was indeed something very weighty about her stage gift," Stanislavski remembered.
