= Alexey Stakhovich =

Imperial Russian Chevalier Guard Regiment officer and stage actor

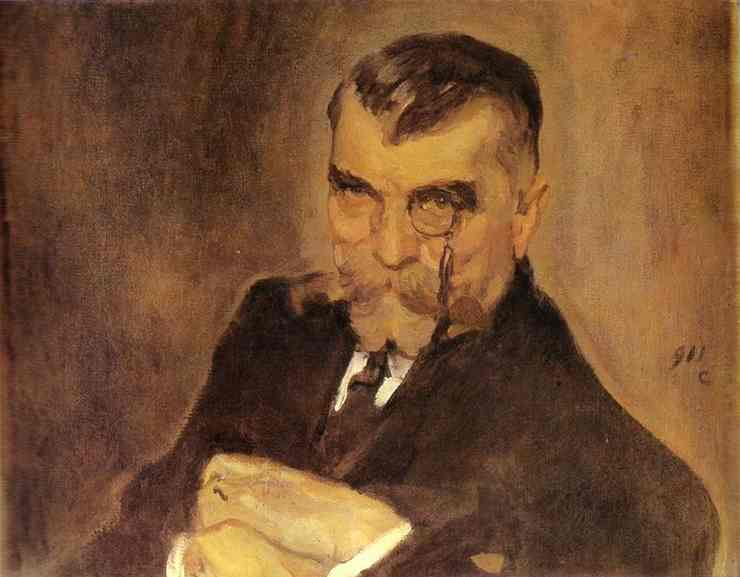
- Portrait by Valentin Serov
- Born: Alexey Alexandrovich Stakhovich; 2 February 1856; Saint Petersburg, Russian Empire
- Died: 10 March 1919 (aged 63); Moscow, RSFSR
- Occupations: army officer, stage actor

Alexey Alexandrovich Stakhovich (Russian: Алексей Александрович Стахович; 2 February 1856 – 10 March 1919) was a high-ranking Imperial Russian Chevalier Guard Regiment officer who in the early 1900s became a popular stage actor, associated with Moscow Art Theatre.

== Biography ==
Born in Saint Petersburg to a well-off noble Oryol-based family with strong artistic traditions (his grandfather was a published playwright, father admired Italian opera and French comedy), Stakhovich made a successful career in the military and was a one-time adjutant for Grand Duke Sergei Alexandrovich of Russia. Retired from the service in 1907 as a major general, he became a co-manager of the Moscow Art Theatre which he had been a co-owner of, since 1902. His 1911 stage debut as Prince Abrezkov in The Living Corpse caused sensation and since then his stage appearances never failed to agitate the public, even if the critics were ambivalent about his artistic range. He started to appear in films in 1915 and two years later joined the Russian Provisional Government as the head of its Theatre Commission.

Stakhovich, who taught 'high class manners' in the MAT school, "...was a gifted man who deeply understood art, but hardly a strong actor... a mere raw material, for he started too late, grasping instantly those technical methods he understood best," argued Prince Sergey Volkonsky. "Stakhovich was not an actor, rather a mannikin of aristocrat. His best part was that of Stepan Verkhovensky in Nikolai Stavrogin [based on Besy by Dostoyevsky], where he was just himself," theatre historian Vadim Shverubovich opined.

On 10 March 1919, outraged by the atrocities committed by the Bolshevist regime and suffering from severe depression, Stakhovich committed suicide by hanging. Marina Tsvetayeva described the effect this had upon the artistic circles of Moscow (and left an expressive portrait of the man) in her essay "The Death of Stakhovich". He is interred in Novodevichye Cemetery in Moscow.
