= Maria Lilina =

Russian stage actress (1866–1943)

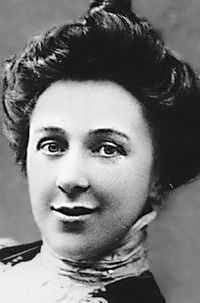
- Lilina, c. 1901
- Born: Maria Petrovna Perevoshchikova; 3 July 1866; Moscow, Russian Empire
- Died: 24 August 1943 (aged 77); Moscow, Russian SFSR, Soviet Union
- Occupation: Actress
- Spouse: Konstantin Stanislavski

Maria Petrovna Alekseyeva (Russian: Мари́я Петро́вна Алексе́ева; née Perevoshchikova [Перево́щикова]; 3 July 1866 – 24 August 1943) was a Russian and Soviet stage actress, associated with the Moscow Art Theatre, better known under her stage name Lilina (Ли́лина). Konstantin Stanislavski, the MAT director, was her husband. In 1933, Lilina was designated as a People's Artist of the RSFSR.

== Career ==
Lilina was a founding member of the MAT troupe which she joined in 1898. Her two breakthrough performances, which brought her to fame, were Masha in The Seagull and Sonya in Uncle Vanya, both praised for "fitting perfectly Chekhov's aesthetics." Also lauded were her Natasha in Three Sisters; later Varya in The Cherry Orchard and Nina Zarechnaya in the renewed Seagull.

In 1906–1915, Lilina played three parts in Alexander Griboyedov's Woe from Wit: Liza, a sly and clever peasant servant, as well as graceful Countess the Granddaughter, and Khlyostova, the latter with satyrical verve and wit. Her tandem with Konstantin Stanislavski in Leo Tolstoy's The Living Corpse (he Prince Abrezkov, she Anna Dmitriyevna) has been described as "the living amalgam of the fullness of life and the precision of the expression."

Lilina was said to have "understood perfectly the electrically charged dynamics of the Dostoyevsky prose, full of emotional overload," and was stunning as Karpukhina in The Uncle's Dream and as Khromonozhka (Limping Girl) in Nikolai Stavrogin (based upon Demons), according to Inna Solovyova. "Many considered her the most subtle and deep of the MAT actresses," this critic argued.

Lilina has always regarded her husband as her teacher and Stanislavski often referred to her as his 'best ever student'. He dedicated his book The Actor's Work on Himself (Работа актера над собой) to Lilina. Her other notable roles included Tatyana in Dmitry Merezhkovsky's Joy Will Come, The Guest (The Life of Man by Leonid Andreyev) and Anna Andreyevna in The Government Inspector (1921).

After MAT's 1923-1924 foreign tour Lilina's domestic obligations started to prevail, her contribution to the theatre became limited. Since 1924 she's had only five new works, including Korobochka in Dead Souls and Yanina in The Embezzlers. In 1935, she started to read drama in Stanislavski's last, Opera and Drama studio, and after his death directed all of the latter's productions.
