= Viktor Simov =

Russian painter

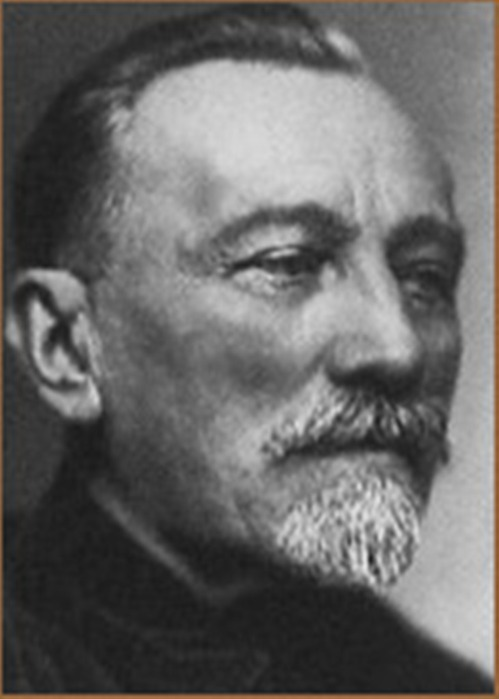
Viktor Simov (1910s)

Viktor Andreyevich Simov (Russian: Виктор Андреевич Си́мов, 14 April 1858 — 21 August 1935) was a Russian painter and scenographer during the Belle Époque, active in Moscow, best known for his work for the Moscow Art Theatre.

== Biography ==
He graduated from the Moscow School of Painting, Sculpture and Architecture in 1882. From 1885 to 1886, he worked as a decorator for Savva Mamontov, at his Private Opera. He also created some paintings and lithographs. In 1896, he held a joint exhibition, with Isaac Levitan and Alexander Popov, in Odessa.

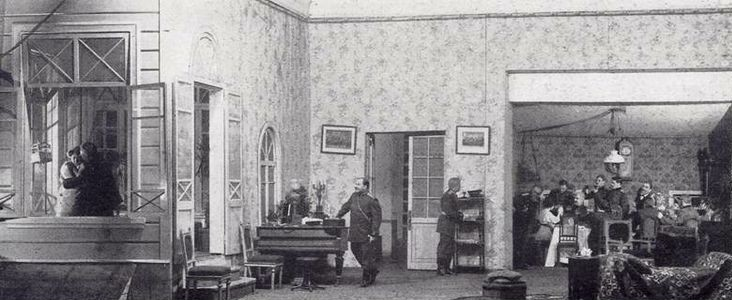
Simov (far right), on his set for Three Sisters

In 1898, he decided to devote his career to working with the newly founded Moscow Art Theatre, where he would create designs for fifty-one performances and earn the admiration of the iconic actor, Konstantin Stanislavski. Simov not only created a new aesthetic for set design, he was also involved with ideological interpretations of the material, and the directing process. Together with Stanislavski, he began the practice of doing field research.

He expanded his activities in 1909, by designing a dacha in collaboration with the architect, Leonid Vesnin. In 1912, for unknown reasons, he left the Art Theatre; working instead at the Moscow Free Theatre, the Maly Theatre, and the Opera Theatre at Stanislavski's acting studios.

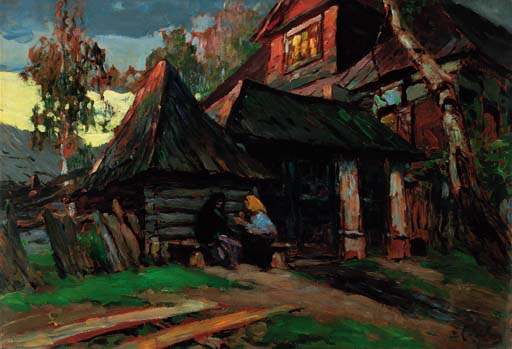
Design for the opera, Khovanshchina

In 1924, he designed sets depicting Mars, for the groundbreaking science-fiction film, Aelita, by Yakov Protazanov. The following year, he also served as an artist, under the direction of Ivan Stepanov, for The Stationmaster, a dramatic film based on a story by Alexander Pushkin. Later that same year, he returned to the Art Theatre, where he would stay until his death in 1935, aged seventy-seven.
