= Ioasaf Tikhomirov =

- Born: 1872
- Died: 1908 (aged 35–36)
- Occupations: Actor and Teacher
- Years active: 1898-1908

Ioasaf Aleksandrovich Tikhomirov (1872–1908) was a male actor from the Russian Empire. He trained under Vladimir Nemirovich-Danchenko, who offered "rigorous and intelligent" courses in actor training at the school of the Moscow Philharmonic Society. Tikhomirov was one of twelve students that Nemirovich brought with him to join the Moscow Art Theatre when he founded it with Constantin Stanislavski in 1898. He acted with the company until 1904 and also served as the director of the Art Theatre School. In 1904 Stanislavski sent Tikhomirov to help Maxim Gorky establish his newly founded theatre in Nizhny Novgorod, but the project was abandoned when the Russian censor banned every play that they proposed to stage.

== Sources ==
- Benedetti, Jean. 1999. Stanislavski: His Life and Art. Revised edition. Original edition published in 1988. London: Methuen. ISBN 0-413-52520-1.
- Whyman, Rose. 2008. The Stanislavsky System of Acting: Legacy and Influence in Modern Performance. Cambridge: Cambridge UP. ISBN 978-0-521-88696-3.
- Worrall, Nick. 1996. The Moscow Art Theatre. Theatre Production Studies ser. London and NY: Routledge. ISBN 0-415-05598-9.
