= Mikhail Darski =

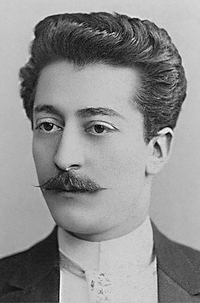
- Born: Mikhail Yegorovich Psaryan; Михаил Егорович Псарьян; 1 September 1865; Tiflis, Georgia, Russian Empire
- Died: 3 May 1930 (aged 64); Leningrad, Soviet Union
- Occupations: Stage actor, theatre director

Mikhail Yegorovich Darski (Russian: Михаил Егорович Дарский, born Psaryan, Russified as either Psarov or Shavrov; 1 September 1865 - 3 May 1930) was a Tiflis-born theatre director, reader in drama and male actor.

A Saint Petersburg University alumnus, he started acting as an amateur in 1882 and in 1884 became a professional, working first in the Russian capital's summer theatres and clubs, then in Vitebsk, Minsk, Zhitomir, Vilno. In 1898 Darski joined the Moscow Art Theatre where his performance as Shylock in Shakespeare's The Merchant of Venice caused a huge scandal. Stanislavsky, while praising the actor's fiery temperament and 'wondrous voice' was less happy with what he saw as 'provincial routine' in his manner of presenting the character and insisted that Darski should emphasise Shylock's ethnicity. This strategy badly backfired. Darski's grotesque portrayal of Shylock prompted accusations in the press of anti-Semitism, and the production was cancelled after ten performances. Darski's other premiere roles in MAT were Prince Andrey Shuyski in Tsar Fyodor Ioannovich by A.K. Tolstoy and Haemon in Antigone by Sophocles.

Mikhail Darski left MAT in 1899 and, after more work in the province, in 1902 joined the Alexandrinsky Theatre with which he stayed until 1924. Here he produced The Seagull by Anton Chekhov and played, among others, the roles of Hamlet, Shylock and Boris Godunov (The Death of Ivan the Terrible by A.K. Tolstoy). Since 1905 Darski was also a reader in drama. In 1930 he was honoured with the title the Meritorious Artist of RSFSR.
