= Evgeniya Rayevskaya =

- Born: Evgeniya Mikhaylovna Rayevskaya; Евгения Михайловна Раевская; 28 September 1854; Yelets, Russian Empire
- Died: 24 March 1932 (aged 77); Moscow, Soviet Union
- Occupation: stage actress
- Awards: Meritorious Artist of RSFSR (1925)

Evgeniya Mikhaylovna Rayevskaya (Russian: Евгения Михайловна Раевская, Yerusalimskaya in marriage; 28 September 1854 – 24 March 1932) was a Yelets-born Russian Empire and later Soviet Union stage actress, associated with the Moscow Art Theatre.

A founder member of the original Stanislavski troupe, Rayevskaya stayed with the theatre for the rest of her life and had, in all, 36 parts in it. Among the roles that she was the first performer of, were Princess Natalya (Men Above the Law by Alexey Pisemsky), Anna Shtrelik (Greta's Happiness by Emilia Matthai), Polina Andreyevna (The Seagull by Anton Chekhov), Euridice (Antigone by Sophocles), Tsarevich Dmitry's nanny (The Death of Ivan the Terrible, Alexey K. Tolstoy), Voynitskaya (Uncle Vanya). In 1918-1919 he was cast in four films, including Polikushka.

In 1925 Rayevskaya was honoured with the Meritorious Artist of RSFSR title.
