= Aleksandr Leonidovich Vishnevsky =

Russian actor (1861–1943)

Aleksandr Vishnevsky
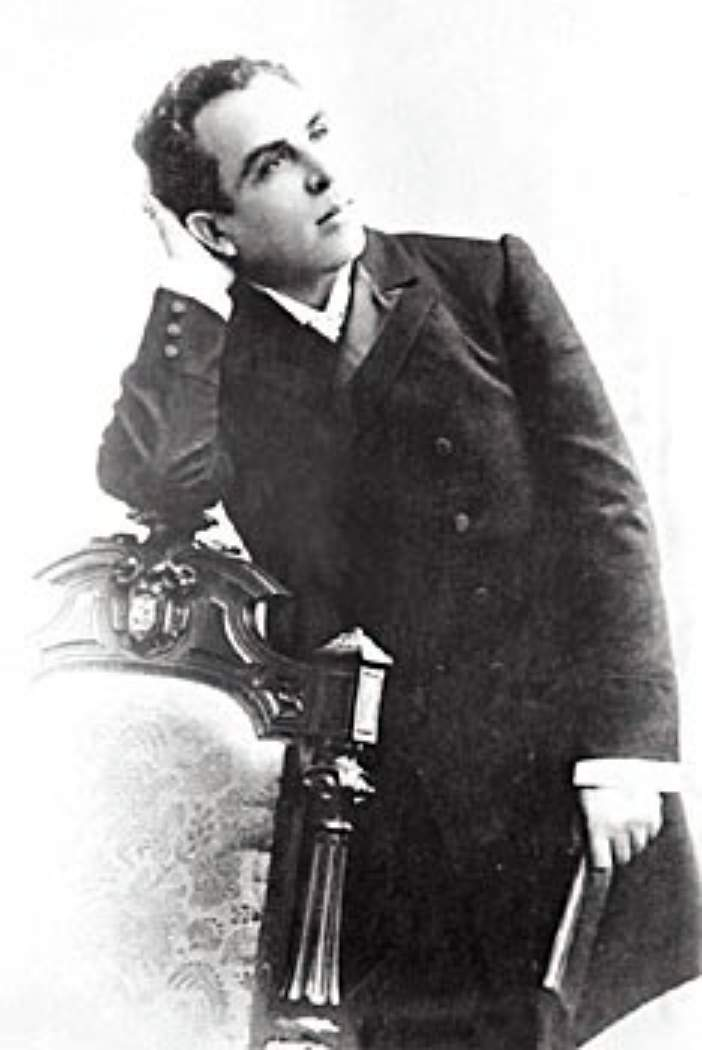
- Born: Aleksandr Leonidovich Vishnevetsky; 1 February 1861; Taganrog, Russian Empire
- Died: 27 February 1943 (aged 82); Tashkent, Soviet Union
- Occupation: Actor
- Years active: 1883–1941

Aleksandr Leonidovich Vishnevsky (Russian: Александр Леонидович Вишневский; 1 February 1861 – 27 February 1943) was a Russian actor and one of the founding members of the Moscow Art Theatre.

== Biography ==
Vishnevsky studied at the Taganrog gymnasium where he befriended the young Anton Chekhov. From 1883 he took part in the performances of the Taganrog Music and Drama Society. Later he acted in the theatres of Kharkiv, Yekaterinoslav, Odesa, Saratov where he was a jeune premier. In 1898 he joined the troupe of the Moscow Art Theatre (MAT). On the opening night of the MAT, Vishnevsky played the part of Boris Godunov in the play Tsar Fyodor Ioannovich by Aleksey Konstantinovich Tolstoy. In 1899 he played Godunov again in Tolstoy's The Death of Ivan the Terrible. Vishnevsky was the first to play the title role in Chekhov's play Uncle Vanya at the MAT.

In 1933 Vishnevsky became the first actor to be awarded the title of Hero of Labour (later replaced with Hero of Socialist Labour). He was also awarded the title of Honoured Worker of the Arts Industry of the RSFSR. He died on 27 February 1943 in Tashkent where he lived in evacuation. He is buried in Tashkent. His son is Aleksandr Vishnevsky, who was a journalist and a senior official at the TASS. His daughter is Natalia Vishnevskaya.

== Career ==
=== Theatre roles ===
(at the Moscow Art Theatre):

- 1898 – Tsar Fyodor Ioannovich by Aleksey Konstantinovich Tolstoy – Boris Godunov
- 1898 – The Merchant of Venice by William Shakespeare – Antonio
- 1898 – The Seagull by Anton Chekhov – Dr Dorn
- 1899 – The Death of Ivan the Terrible by Aleksey Konstantinovich Tolstoy – Boris Godunov
- 1900 – An Enemy of the People by Henrik Ibsen – Hovstad
- 1902 – The Lower Depths by Maxim Gorky – Tatar
- 1903 – Julius Caesar by William Shakespeare – Mark Antonius
- 1906 – Woe from Wit by Alexander Griboyedov – Count Tugoukhovsky
- 1907 – Boris Godunov by Alexander Pushkin – Boris Godunov

=== Filmography ===
- 1918 – Cagliostro (“The False Masons”), Russia, Rus, black-and-white
- 1927 – Woman's Victory a.k.a. Pobeda zhenschiny (“Boyar Nikit Yurievich”), USSR, Mezhrabpomrus, black-and-white, 62 min.

=== Acknowledgement and awards ===
- Hero of Labour (1933)
- Honoured Worker of the Arts Industry of the RSFSR (1933)
- Order of the Red Banner of Labour (1937)
