= Alexander Artyom =

Russian stage actor

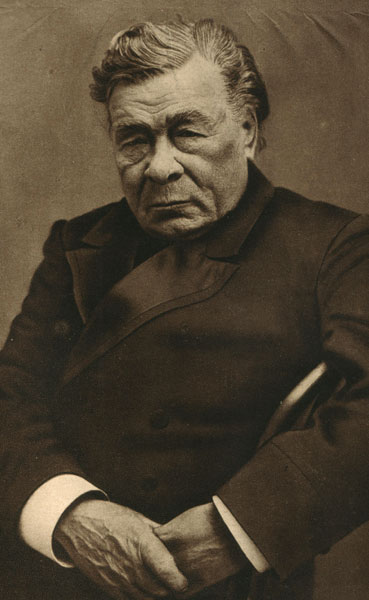
- Born: Alexander Rodionovich Artemyev; Александр Родионович Артемьев; 1842; Stolpovo, Moscow Governorate, Russian Empire
- Died: 16 May 1914 (aged 71–72); Moscow, Russian Empire
- Occupation: stage actor

Alexander Rodionovich Artemyev (Russian: Александр Родионович Артемьев; 1842 – 16 May 1914) was a Russian stage actor, associated with Moscow Art Theatre and better known under his stage name Artyom (Артём).

== Life ==
Born in Stolpovo, Moscow Governorate to a serf peasant single mother, Artemyev managed to enroll into the Moscow Art School and, after graduating it in 1878, started to teach art, painting and calligraphy In early 1880s got interested in theatre and in 1888, after having seen cast as Schastlivtsev in an amateur production of Alexander Ostrovsky's The Forest, he was invited to join Maly Theatre but preferred to become a member of the Art and Literature Society where he had met Konstantin Stanislavski a year earlier. In 1898 Artemyev became a member of the original Moscow Art Theatre troupe and in its first season made himself quite a name, having appeared in Tsar Fyodor Ioannovich (Bogdan Kryukov), Men Above the Law (Devochkin), The Seagull (Shamrayev, all 1898), as well as Uncle Vanya (Telegin, 1899).

Anton Chekhov referred to Artyom as his favourite MAT actor and wrote the part of Firs in The Cherry Orchard especially for him. The master of episode, he was, according to Stanislavsky, "the epitome of modesty who never exposed himself, always preferring to rather shuffle into the background." The mystery of Artyom's charismatic stage persona continued to intrigue theatre historians long after his death in 1914, one of them calling the actor "the embodiment of the human spirit in it its most basic form."
