= Maria Andreyeva (actress) =

Russian/Soviet actress and Bolshevik administrator

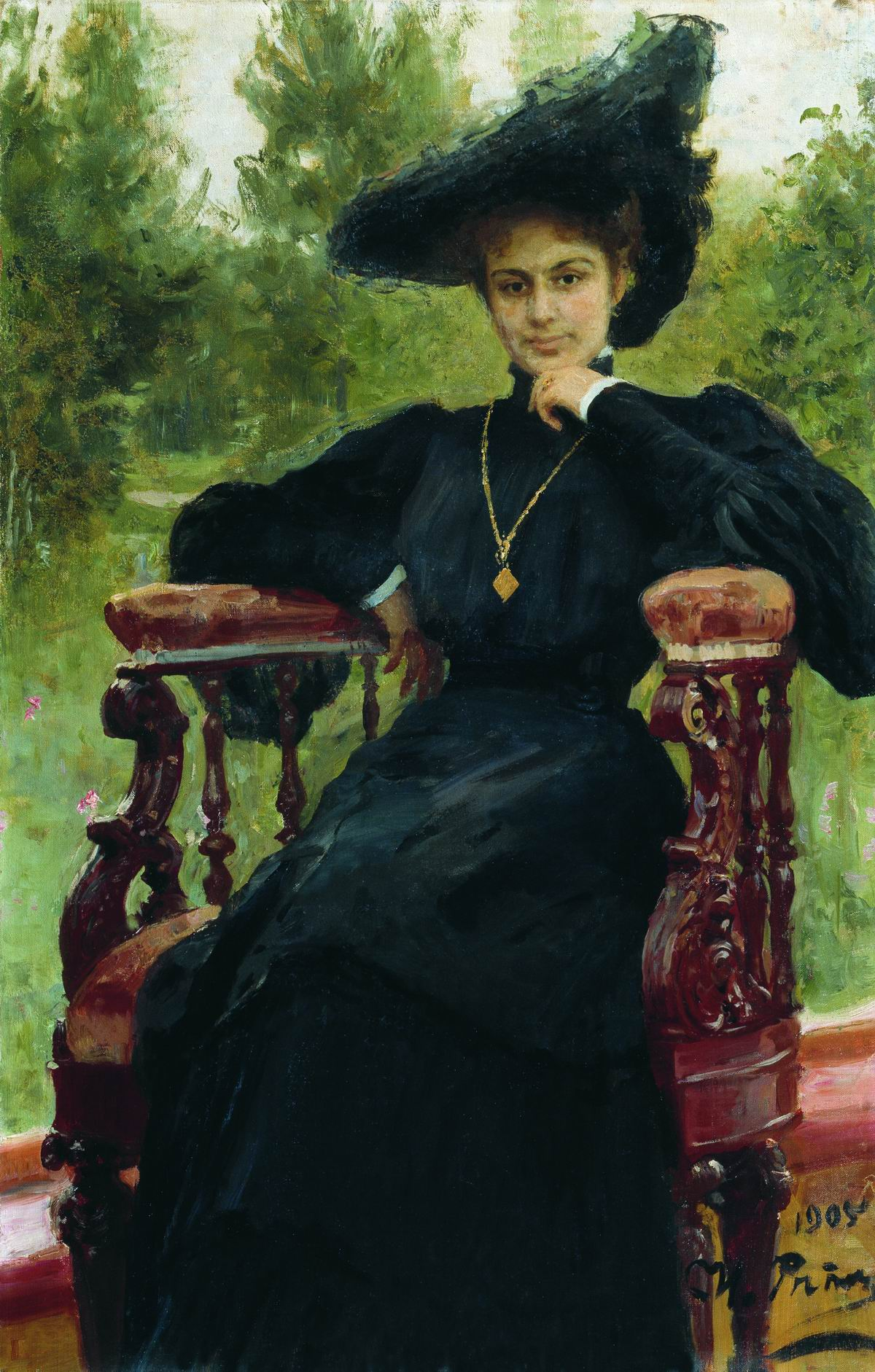
Portrait by Ilya Repin

Maria Fyodorovna Andreyeva (Russian: Мари́я Фёдоровна Андре́ева, Mariya Fyodorovna Andreyeva) was the stage name of Maria Fyodorovna Yurkovskaya (Мари́я Фёдоровна Юрко́вская) (4 July 1868 – 8 December 1953), a Russian/Soviet actress and Bolshevik administrator.

== Early life ==
Her father, Fyodor Alexandrovich Fyodorov-Yurkovsky (Фёдор Александрович Фёдоров-Юрковский, 1842–1915) was the director of the Alexandrinsky Theatre, and her mother was an actress. She followed into the steps of her parents. After drama school she went to Kazan, aged 18. She married Andrey Zhelyabuzhsky, who was her elder by 18 years. He was controller of the Kursk and Nizhny Novgorod railroads, but was also involved in theatre. The couple had two children, Yuri (1888–1955) and Yekaterina (born 1894). Yuri went on to become a film director.

== Early career ==
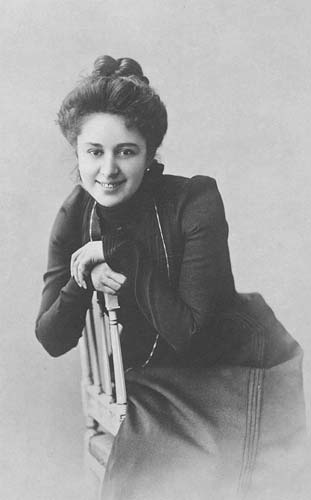
Maria Andreyeva

After Zhelyabuzhsky received a new post, the family moved to Tiflis, where she had success as an actress. They next moved to Moscow, where Andreyeva worked with Konstantin Stanislavski at the Moscow Art Theatre. She made her Moscow debut on 15 December 1894. She enjoyed great success.

Andreyeva took an interest in Marxist literature and she secretly joined the Russian Social Democratic Labour Party. In 1902, she decided to leave acting. In 1900, she met Maxim Gorky in Sevastopol the first time. In 1903 she became his common-law wife.

Gorky and Andreyeva left Russia in 1906 and traveled around the United States, and then settled in Capri, Italy. While in Capri, Gorky was involved in the Vpered group but Andreyeva fell out with Anna Aleksandrovna Lunacharskaya, wife of Anatoly Lunacharsky and sister of Alexander Bogdanov.

== Career in theatrical administration ==
Already by 1914, she was active in attempts to promote classical theatre to the masses. Only after the October Revolution did these endeavours bear fruits. Between 1918 and 1921, she was Commissar of Theaters and Public Shows in Petrograd. She was instrumental in the establishment of the Bolshoi Drama Theater, which opened in 1919. In January that year, Anatoly Lunacharsky nominated her as his deputy in his role of head of art section of the Narkompros in Petrograd. The Petrograd Soviet refused to confirm her nomination, but Vladimir Lenin intervened in her favor and the appointment went ahead.

In 1920, Lunacharsky offered her the position of head of TEO, the theatre department of Narkompros, in Moscow, but she refused due to personal reasons.

== Later career ==
In 1921 she traveled abroad selling antiques and works of art, and from 1922 she represented the Commissariat of Foreign Trade in relation to the film industry, spending some time with the Soviet trade delegation in Berlin. During this period she separated from Gorky. Between 1931 and 1948, she held the post of Director of the House of Scientists in Moscow.
