= Drayman Henschel =

Play by Gerhart Hauptmann

- Original language: German
- Written by: Gerhart Hauptmann
- Characters: Drayman Henschel; Mrs Henschel; Hanne Schael; Bertha; Horse Dealer Walther; Siebenhaar; Karlchen; Wermelskirch; Mrs Wermelskirch; Franziska Wermelskirch; Hauffe; Franz; George; Fabig; Hildebrant; Veterinarian Grunert; Fireman
- Genre: Naturalism
- Setting: Grey Swan Hotel, Silesia; Late 1860s

Premiere
- Date: 5 November 1898
- Place: Deutsches Theater, Berlin

Drayman Henschel (German: Fuhrmann Henschel), also known as Carter Henschel, is an 1898 five-act naturalistic play by the German playwright Gerhart Hauptmann. Unlike his 1892 play The Weavers, Hauptmann focuses on the story's psychological rather than social dimensions. As with his 1902 play Rose Bernd, the play charts the demise of an ordinary man who falls victim to circumstances beyond his control. As with many of Hauptmann's dramas, it ends with the main character's suicide.

== Plot ==
Malchen Henschel is feeling sickly and feels she may die. She bandies words with Hanne, a gruff servant. Her husband enters, discussing his business as a drayman, carting goods from one place to another. Mrs. Henschel is jealous when she learns that her husband was kind enough to get Hanne's apron for her. If she dies, what would happen to Gustel, her baby daughter? Says Malchen: "One thing I tell you now—If I dies, Gustel dies along with me! I'll take her with me! I'll strangle her before I'd leave her to a damned wench like that!", and has Wilhelm promise not to marry Hanne after her death. Since the death of Mrs. Henschel, Hanne is worried about what people say of her relations with the widower. Henschel reflects on Hanne: "The girl's a good girl. She's a bit young for an old fellow like me, but she c'n work enough for four men. An' she's taken very kindly to Gustel; no mother could do more'n she. An' the girl's got a head on her, that's sure, better'n mine." Siebenhaar, proprietor of a hotel, encourages him to forget his vow to the dead wife. Now married to Henschel, Hanne is stunned on learning that he has brought with him her daughter, born out of wedlock, from the grips of her irresponsible and drunken father, though she denies that the girl is hers. The death of Gustel may be compensated by the arrival of Berthel. In the tap room of Wermelskirch's public house, several men grumble about the changes in Henschel's character since his second marriage, blaming Hanne. Says Walther, the horse-dealer: "Very well, I s'pose you're noticin' it all yourself. Formerly, you had nothin' but friends. Nowadays nobody comes to you no more; an' even if they did want to come they stay away on account o' your wife." Hauffe, turned out of his job because of her, suggests that Gustel may have been poisoned by Hanne. Speaking of George, a waiter, Walther comments to Henschel: "Your wife an' he—they c'n compete with each other makin' a fool o' you!" Henschel challenges his wife: "He says that you deceive me before my face an' behind my back!" Says Hanne: "What? What? What? What?", to which Henschel responds: "That's what he says! Is he goin' to dare to say that? An' that ... my wife ...", after which Hanne says: "Me? Lies! Damned lies!", throwing her apron over her face and rushing out. Henschel is more and more despondent. In discussing his marriage woes with Siebenhaar, Henschel reminds him of his broken vow: "You know well enough!—I broke it an' when I did that, I was lost. I was done for. The game was up.—An' you see: now she can't find no rest." Husband and wife retire for the night. Says Henschel: "Let it be. To-morrow is another day. Everythin' changes, as Siebenhaar says. To-morrow, maybe, everythin'll look different." But when Siebenhaar looks in at his silent figure in the bed, he tells Hanne that her husband is dead.

== History of the play ==
Hauptmann began writing the play in 1897 and completed it the following year, when it was also first published. It received its première in Berlin, opening at the Deutsches Theater on 5 November 1898.

The seminal theatre practitioner Konstantin Stanislavski directed a Russian-language production of the play as part of the second season of the Moscow Art Theatre. Stanislavski worked on his production plan for the play during a holiday in March 1899 and rehearsals began in April; his score included the off-stage noises of striking billiard balls, coins clinking, and a banal waltz. The production opened on 17 October [O.S. 5 October] 1899. V. L. Yuren'yeva wrote of it:

The people are really alive . . . There is very little make-up and no 'theatricality' whatsoever. They eat real sausage for breakfast, slice cheese with holes in it from a square block. The housemaids smell of freshly starched aprons and the rustle of their skirts can be heard about the stage. The actors literally ignore the audience, acting for and between themselves. They are swallowed up by their own feelings, weigh and absorb the eye contact of their fellow actors.

There were at least two other productions of the play in Russia that year—one at the private Korsch Theatre (which opened on 31 August 1899) and another at the Maly (which opened on 2 September 1899).

== Sources ==
- Banham, Martin, ed. 1998. The Cambridge Guide to Theatre. Cambridge: Cambridge UP. ISBN 0-521-43437-8.
- Benedetti, Jean, ed. and trans. 1991. The Moscow Art Theatre Letters. London: Methuen. ISBN 0-413-69870-X
- ---. 1999. Stanislavski: His Life and Art. Revised edition. Original edition published in 1988. London: Methuen. ISBN 0-413-52520-1.
- Hartnoll, Phyllis, ed. 1983. The Oxford Companion to the Theatre. 4th ed. Oxford: Oxford UP. ISBN 0-19-211546-4.
- Jelavich, Peter. 1984. "Hauptmann, Gerhart." In McGraw-Hill Encyclopedia of World Drama: an International Reference Work in 5 Volumes. Vol. 2. Ed. Stanley Hochman. 2nd ed. New York: McGraw-Hill. 452–463. ISBN 0-07-079169-4.
- Lewisohn, Ludwig, trans. 1913. Drayman Henschel By Gerhart Hauptmann. In The Dramatic Works of Gerhart Hauptmann. Volume Two: Social Dramas. Ed. Ludwig Lewisohn. New York: Huebsch. 1–156. Available online.
- Worrall, Nick. 1996. The Moscow Art Theatre. Theatre Production Studies ser. London and NY: Routledge. ISBN 0-415-05598-9.
