= Inna Solovyova =

- Инна Соловьёва
- Born: 16 November 1927; Moscow, Russian SFSR, Soviet Union
- Died: 29 May 2024 (aged 96); Moscow, Russia
- Occupations: Theatre critic; Film critic; Scholar
- Years active: 1954–2024
- Awards: Order of Friendship; Order of Honour; State Prize of the Russian Federation; Order "For Merit to the Fatherland"; Golden Mask; Order of Alexander Nevsky

Inna Natanovna Solovyova (Russian: Инна Натановна Соловьёва; née Bazilevskaya; 16 November 1927 – 29 May 2024) was a Russian theatre and film critic and scholar. She wrote for the magazines Teatr. and Novy Mir as well as the newspaper Kultura. Solovyova taught a theatre criticism workshop at the Russian Institute of Theatre Arts and taught the history of Russian theatre at the Moscow Art Theatre School. She was the author of books on cinema and theatre. Solovyova was a recipient of the Order of Friendship, the Order of Honour, the State Prize of the Russian Federation, the Order "For Merit to the Fatherland", the Golden Mask and the Order of Alexander Nevsky.

== Early life ==
Solovyova was born in Moscow on 16 November 1927. Her father was the Soviet playwright Natan Bazilevsky-Blumkin. In 1949, Solovyova graduated the theatre studies department and postgraduate programme under the tutelage of the theatre critic Pavel Markov at the Russian Institute of Theatre Arts (GITIS). She defended her defended her dissertation on The Moscow Art Theatre in the Period of Preparation for the 1905 Revolution in 1952, a subject she was interested in since her youth.

== Career ==
Starting in 1954, Solovyova was a member of the circle of young critics who gathered to write for the magazine Teatr., the newspaper Kultura as well as the magazine Novy Mir. In 1967, she joined the Moscow Art Theatre School Studio's Commission for the Study and Publication of the Legacy of Konstantin Stanislavski and Vladimir Nemirovich-Danchenko, which later became, through her efforts, a research department of the school in 2008, researching and analysing the Moscow Art Theater. From 1982 to 2001, she taught a theatre criticism workshop at GITIS and was appointed head of the research sector of the Moscow Art Theatre School in 2000, teaching the history of Russian theatre. She administered examinations to graduate students, attended dissertation defences and was a lecturer. According to The Economist, Solovyova would spend approximately 10 to 12 hours per day, almost uninterrupted, until she had completed her task. Some of Solovyova's most notable students include the critics Marina Davidova, Dina Goder and Gleb Sitkovsky.

She was the author of eight books on cinema and theatre. These include Cinema of Italy (1945–1960), Essays in 1961, a collection of articles known as The Performance is on Today in 1966; Jean Gabin (with Vera Shitova) about the French actor Jean Gabin in 1967; Nemirovich-Danchenko in 1979, Fourteen Sessions (with V. Shitova) in 1981, K.S. Stanislavsky (with V. Shitova) in 1985, and Branches and Roots in 1998. Under her editorship, with her prefaces, Stanislavsky's director's manuscripts were included in the six-volume edition Director's Copies and published between 1980 and 1994; the six-volume edition of K.S. Stanislavsky's Director's Copies as well as the Director's Copies of Uncle Vanya were published. She also wrote volumes 1 to 2 of Moscow Art Theatre. 100 Years with Anatoly Mironovich Smelyansky and Olga Egoshina in 1998 in which she authored around 200 articles for the book, Vl. I. Nemirovich-Danchenko. Creative Legacy volumes 1 to 4 in 2004, volumes 1 to 2 of Letters from O. Bokshanskaya to Vl. I. Nemirovich-Danchenko in 2005, The Second Moscow Art Theatre. An Attempt to Reconstruct a Biography in 2010. She wrote the book The First Studio – The Second Moscow Art Theatre in 2016.

Solovyova became a member of the Union of Soviet Writers in 1960.

== Personal life ==
She died in Moscow on 29 May 2024. Solovyova's farewell ceremony took place on 3 June at the Moscow Art Theatre and the urn with her ashes was buried in the columbarium of the Donskoye Cemetery.

== Awards ==
She was made a Laureate of the USSR Writers' Union Prize in 1969, and was named an Honored Art Worker of the Russian Federation on 23 November 1993 "for services in the field of art". Solovyoba was a recipient of the Order of Friendship on 23 October 1998 "for many years of fruitful work in the field of theatrical arts and in connection with the 100th anniversary of the Moscow Art Academic Theatre". She was awarded the Order of Honour on 22 February 2003 "for many years of fruitful work in the field of culture and art".

Solovyoba received the State Prize of the Russian Federation on 12 June 2004 "for long-term scientific research and publication of the creative legacy of the founders of the Moscow Art Theatre.", and the Order "For Merit to the Fatherland", 4th degree on 4 June 2008 "for a major contribution to the development of domestic and world theatrical art and many years of fruitful scientific and pedagogical activity." She was named the winner of the Golden Mask in the "Honour and Dignity" category in 2009. Solovyoba received the Order of Alexander Nevsky on 29 June 2018 "for a significant contribution to the development of Russian culture and art, mass media, and many years of fruitful activity."
