= The Sunken Bell =

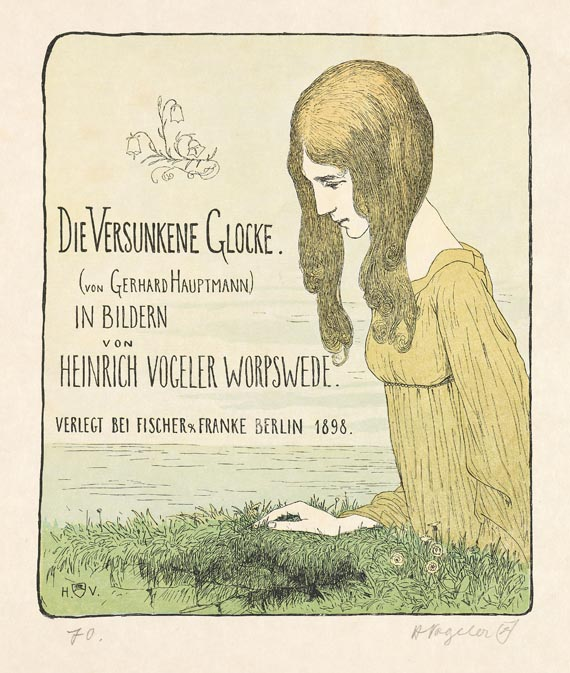
Heinrich Vogeler, Die versunkene Glocke title page, 1898

The Sunken Bell (German: Die versunkene Glocke) is a poetic play in blank verse by Gerhart Hauptmann (2. December 1896 in Berlin).

== Plot ==
It is a fairy drama, the chief human character of which is Heinrich, a master bellfounder who has completed his crowning work, a bell which is to be hung in a church on a mountain inhabited by sprites. Through the hostility of the sprites, the wagon bearing the bell is overthrown and the latter is sunk in a mountain lake. Heinrich is injured and is nursed by the chief personage of the drama, Rautendelein, half child, half fairy, whose love changes Heinrich's standards and brings about the death of his wife.

== See also ==
- La campana sommersa, an opera by Ottorino Respighi based on the play
