= Vladimir Nemirovich-Danchenko =

Soviet and Russian theatre director, writer, playwright, and producer

- Владимир Немирович-Данченко
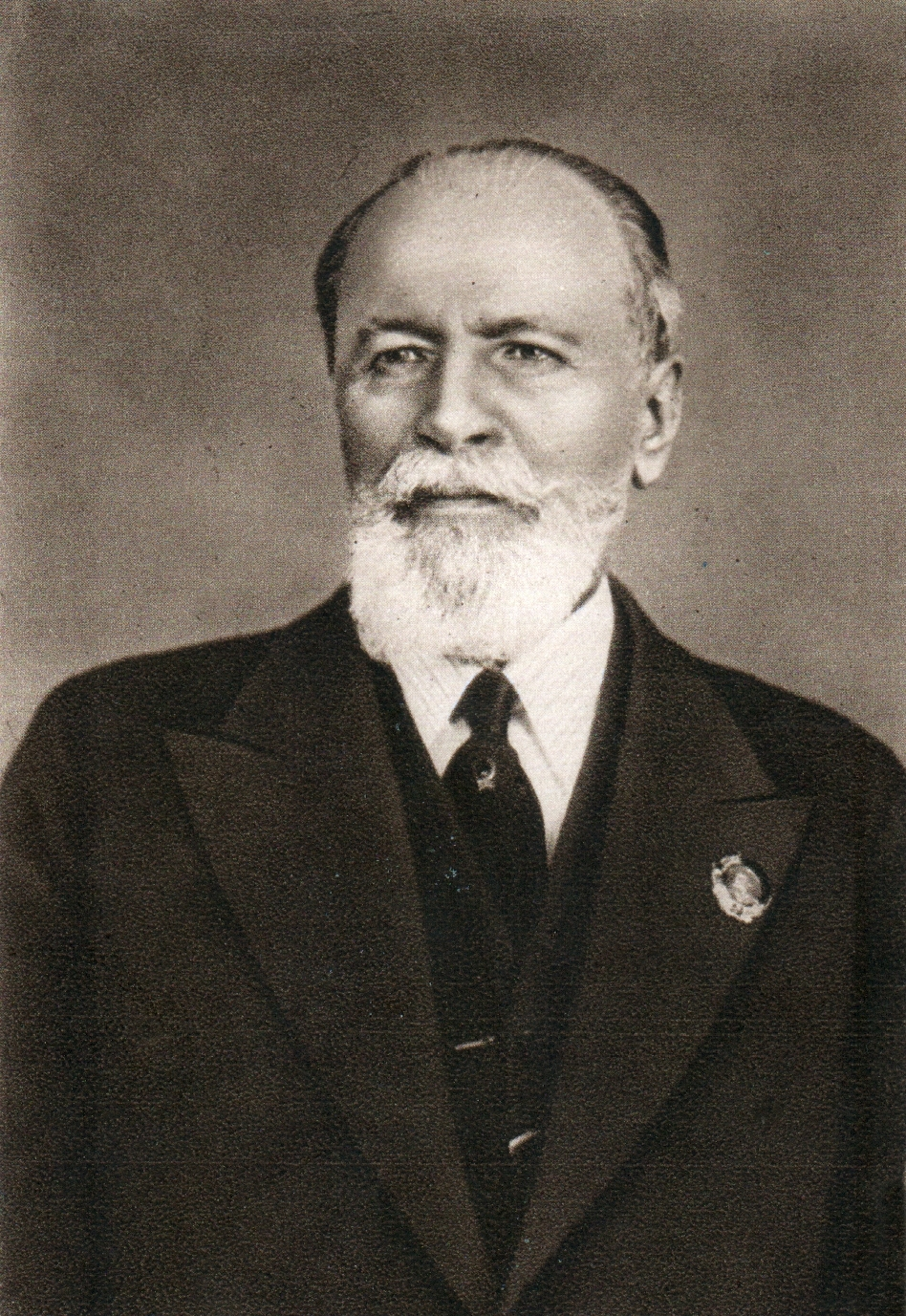
- Born: Vladimir Ivanovich Danchenko; 23 December [O.S. 11 December] 1858; Shemokmedi, Russian Empire
- Died: 25 April 1943 (aged 84); Moscow, Russian SFSR, Soviet Union
- Resting place: Novodevichy Cemetery, Moscow
- Education: Moscow State University
- Occupations: Actor; theatre director; theatre pedagogist
- Writing career
- Notable works: Founder of the Moscow Art Theatre and Stanislavski and Nemirovich-Danchenko Theatre
- Movements: Naturalism; symbolism; psychological realism; socialist realism

Vladimir Ivanovich Nemirovich-Danchenko (Russian: Владимир Иванович Немирович-Данченко; 23 December [O.S. 11 December] 1858 – 25 April 1943) was a Soviet and Russian theatre director, writer, pedagogue, playwright, producer and theatre administrator, who founded the Moscow Art Theatre with his colleague, Konstantin Stanislavski, in 1898.

== Biography ==
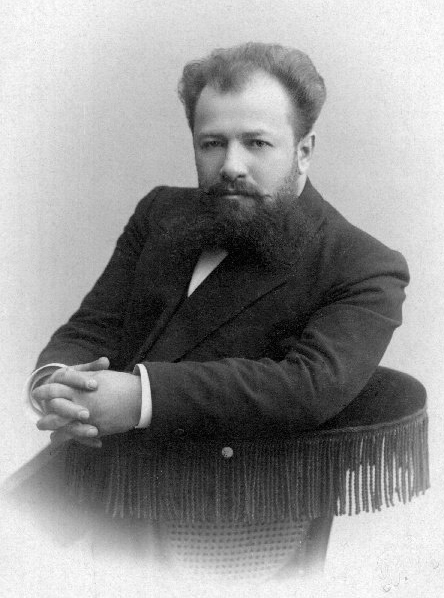
Nemirovich-Danchenko, c. 1900

Vladimir Ivanovich Danchenko was born into a Russian noble family of mixed Ukrainian-Armenian descent, in the village of Shemokmedi near Ozurgeti (Guria, Georgia). His father, Ivan Danchenko, was an officer in the Imperial Russian Army, and his mother, Aleksandra Yagubyan (1829–1914), was Armenian from the Governorate of Tiflis. He went to high school in Tbilisi, continuing his education at Moscow State University (physical-mathematical and juridical departments, 1876–1879).

In 1879, he left the university for the theatre, starting as a theatre critic, and in 1881, his first play "Dog-rose", which was staged in one year by Maly Theatre, was published. He was a teacher of Ivan Moskvin, Olga Knipper and Vsevolod Meyerhold.

In 1919, he established the Musical Theatre of the Moscow Art Theatre, which was reformed into the Nemirovich-Danchenko Musical Theatre in 1926. In 1943 Nemirovich-Danchenko established the Moscow Art Theatre School, which is still extant.

He died of a heart attack on 25 April 1943, aged 84, in Moscow.

== Legacy ==
Nemirovich-Danchenko's Moscow Art Theatre staged Chekhov and Gorky drama with theretofore unknown naturalism and full expression. In addition, his theatre presented highly acclaimed Dostoevsky and Tolstoy dramatizations. It has been said that "If Stanislavski was the soul of Art Theatre, then Nemirovich was its heart".

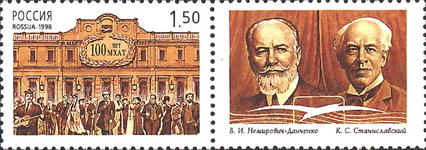
Russian 1998 commemorative postage stamp of Stanislavski and Nemirovich-Danchenko

Nemirovich-Danchenko created the Moscow Art Theatre's acting and directing style, known for "actors ensemble" and its "atmosphere". Because of his directorial and production skills, the Moscow Art Theatre was considered, at the time, the best theatre in the Soviet Union. But Nemirovich didn't write down his acting "system" and we know only the "system of Stanislavski". He was one of the first recipients of the title of People's Artist of the USSR in 1936. Later, he was awarded the Order of Lenin (3 May 1937) and the Stalin Prize (1942, 1943).

== Productions ==
- The Brothers Karamazov (1910)
- Resurrection (1930)
- Anna Karenina (1937)
- Three Sisters (1940)
