= Tsar Boris (drama) =

- Original language: Russian
- Written by: Aleksey Konstantinovich Tolstoy
- Genre: Drama

Premiere
- Date: 1870

Tsar Boris (Russian: Царь Борис) is an 1870 drama by Aleksey Konstantinovich Tolstoy, written in 1868–1869 and first published in the No.3, March 1870 issue of the Vestnik Evropy magazine. It became the third and the final part of Tolstoy's acclaimed historical drama trilogy started by The Death of Ivan the Terrible (1864) and continued by Tsar Fyodor Ioannovich (1868).

== History ==
On 27 August 1868, Aleksey Tolstoy wrote in a letter to the Vestnik Evropys editor Mikhail Stasyulevich: "[As for] Tsar Boris, I'm going to start it in the nearest future: all the necessary material is at hand." The work began in the early October and on November 11 of the same year the author informed Nikolay Kostomarov that Act I has been just finished. In a December 2 letter to Stasyulevich he opined that this first piece has "turned out well."

Then Tolstoy became intrigued by the character of the Danish Prince Johan, princess Ksenya's fiancé and Prince Christian’s brother, and spent some time investigating his background. On 7 February 1869, Tolstoy informed his friend and translator Boleslav Markevich that "this giant ship has taken another start and is now breaking waves."

While working on the Act 2 Tolstoy was being distracted continuously: numerous ballads ("The Song of Harald and Yaroslavna", "Three Massacres", "The Song of Vladimir's Korsunh Campaign") were written in those days. On February 19, he wrote to Stasyulevich: "Two acts are now ready. The third one will be crucial in answering the question, whether the whole thing has been worthwhile." In June 1869 he finished the Act 3 and informed Afanasy Fet on this in a June 23 letter. By November 3 the play has been completed. On November 30 four Acts of the play were sent to Vestnik Evropy, with a promise that the fifth one will follow suit. On the same day Tolstoy sent a copy to Kostomarov, asking him to check the conversations of the two fugitive monks, Misail and Grigory, then made some corrections.

While still working on the play, Tolstoy mentioned in a letter to the editor that his wife liked Tsar Boris better than the two other plays of the trilogy and that he tended to agree with her. Later he had to admit Tsar Fyodor Ioannovich objectively was the strongest of the three, even if he liked Tsar Boris a lot.

In the spring of 1870, as the third of the three tragedies came out in a separate edition, Tolstoy submitted it to the theater censorship department. On April 28 the play, with minor cuts, received the censors' permission. But the directorial Committee of the Imperial Theatres refused to accept it. Tsar Boris was premiered in Anna Brenko's Moscow Pushkin Theatre (Note: Not to be confused with the Moscow Pushkin Drama Theatre founded in 1914 by Tairov. Anna Brenko's, Russia's first private theater, lasted only for two years, 1880-1882.) in 1881, six years after Tolstoy's death.

=== Characters' development ===
In the course of those seven years Tolstoy spent working on his drama trilogy his attitude towards some of its characters changed. In the second and especially in the third play Boris Godunov comes across as more deep and complicated figure. According to biographer Igor Yampolsky, Tolstoy started to recognize in him a potentially European-type monarch whose idea was to lead Russia out of its historical isolation and patriarchal stagnation into the world political arena. On the other hand, Tolstoy's attitude towards Maria, the wife of Boris, has changed from bad to worse: more and more he was attributing to her Boris' "evil" features. While in The Death of Ivan the Terrible Maria gets horrified and frightened when learning of her husband's ambitions, in Tsar Boris she helps him with zest and cruelty, motivated by personal interests, not by those of the state. The two Marias – of the first and the third play – were so different that Tolstoy seriously considered re-working parts of The Death of Ivan the Terrible in 1870, before all three were to be published as a single book.

==== The Danish Prince ====
Aleksey Tolstoy, who used Nikolay Karamzin's History of the Russian State as the major source, became intrigued by and confused with the character of John, Prince of Schleswig-Holstein, princess Ksenya's fiancé and Christian IV of Denmark's brother. He applied to both Kostomarov and Baron Karl Ungern-Sternberg for help, trying to resolve a mystery of "how could Ksenya's bridegroom have fought (according to Karamzin) in the Netherlands under the Spanish banner." "Please, help me to understand how and why he, apparently a Protestant, could have fought on the Spanyards' side. Could he have been a Catholic? Or perhaps he came against the Netherlands for the reason of Sweden having been its ally? All this is essential for my understanding of the Dutch prince's character," the author wrote in a letter.

Neither Kostomarov nor Baron Ungern-Sternberg could provide the definitive answers to the dilemma, so Tolstoy chose to support the version contradicting that of Karamzin. According to the play, when the Spanish king "rose to war, threatening to chain the free nation down," the Dutch prince "came up to help his persecuted brothers" and fight against Spain. Meanwhile, Karl Ungern-Sternberg's help proved to be essential in some other way. The Baron sent Tolstoy excerpts from the official Danish chronicles, some of which mentioned Johan's being King Frederick's illegitimate child. This detail provided the author with the possible motive for the assassination of the Danish Prince. On 30 November 1869, he wrote to Stasyulevich:

Some of those [chronicles] refer to [Johan] as being 'illegitimate'. This came in handy, helping me to come up with the possible motive of him being poisoned. The notion that he might have been poisoned could be found in our chronicles too, but this deed is usually ascribed to Boris, which I see as going totally against the logic. And so I cast the suspicion upon Boris' wife Maria, Skuratov's daughter.

As for the name, in excerpts provided by Baron Ungern-Sternberg and in some of the Russian chronicles, the Danish Prince had been referred to as both Johan (Ioann) and Christian (apparently as a result of confusing him with a better known brother) and Tolstoy decided to choose the latter ("so as for him not to be confused with Ioann Grozny").

==== The False Dmitry ====
Even after completing the Act 1, Tolstoy was still unsure which version of False Dmitriy I's true identity he'd support: it was just the Grigory Otrepyev one that he rejected outright. Then, the Impostor's plotline, initially considered to be significant, was dropped altogether, for this strand of the story would have got in the way of the play's main idea, as the author saw it. "The battle that my hero fights and loses is the battle with the ghost of his own crime, haunting him as some sort of mysterious threatening creature which gradually destroys his life… The whole drama which begins with Boris' inauguration is, in effect, nothing but a grandiose fall. It ends with Boris' death which is brought about not by poison but by the general anemia of a guilty man who comes to the realization of what a mistake his crime had been," Tolstoy wrote in a letter to Princess Saine-Witgenstein on 17 October 1869.

==== Minor characters ====
There were few fictitious characters in Tsar Boris, all of them minor ones: Dementyevna, Resheto, Nakovalnya, the posadsky, Mitya. The latter's emergence Tolstoy explained in a November 30, 1869, letter to Stasyulevich: "The introduction of Mitya the Outlaw was prompted by Schiller's advice he's given through his Marquis of Posa character: "Let them treat with respect dreams of their youths." What Tolstoy meant, apparently, was that Mitya appeared in the Prince Serebrenni novel, where Resheto and Nakovalnya were given a mention too.

=== Sources ===
The major source for all three plays of Aleksey Tolstoy's historical drama was Nikolay Karamzin's History of the Russian State (1816–1826). The conversation in Tsar Boris between Semyon and Boris Godunov concerning prospects of attaching peasants to land accurately reproduces fragments of History (Vol.X, 209–210, Vol.XI, 22, 86). Maria Godunova's talking of Boris' intention of making Prince Johan the King of Estonia has been borrowed from the same source (Vol.XI, 45).

Among other books Tolstoy used as sources the Dutch trader Isaac Massa's memoirs published in 1868 in Brussels, Mikhail Pogodin's book The History in Characters of Boris Godunov and His Times (1868) and Nikolay Kostomarov's Moscow State's Time of Troubles in the Early XVII c. (1868). It was according to Massa's account that Tolstoy, admittedly, recreated Maria Godunova, the way she looked and behaved. From Massa's book the episode of Godunov's meeting the ex-Queen, late Prince Dmitry's mother, has been taken. (Note: Massa's book was also used by Kostomarov, so the latter might have been a more direct source for Tolstoy, Yampolsky argued.)

Tolstoy rejected Karamzin's version of The False Dmitry being Otrepyev, a fugitive monk. "We are to know for sure who he is. And we must give him name, even if we are to invent it," Boris insists in the play. That was exactly Kostomarov's idea: "The Grishka [Otrepyev]'s name has been chosen as the first one that came to hand. They had to name [the Impostor] urgently, rip him off that awful Dmitry name," he wrote.

==== Karamzin and Pushkin parallels ====
Scholars, analyzing Tsar Boris next to Aleksander Pushkin's Boris Godunov, noted several similarities, one obvious reason being that both authors used Karamzin's History of the Russian State as a major source. As a result, the prayer (which in Pushkin's play is pronounced by a young boy in Shuysky's house, and in Tolstoy's Shuysky does himself, at Romanov's) in both dramas looks like the same text. Among Tsar Boris' direct borrowings from Karamzin is the scene where the Tsar is receiving ambassadors in Act 1 which is, in effect, the dramatization of the first paragraphs of Karamzin's History, Vol.IX ("The External Affairs" section). Some fragments of Tolstoy's tragedy might be seen as references to those of Pushkin's. The Scene 1 of Act IV (with common people talking of The False Dmitry and Grigory Otrepyev dilemma) looks like almost a paste from the Boris Godunov's scene at the "Square before the Cathedral in Moscow". In fact, the whole way of the Godunov character's evolution, from The Death of Ivan the Terrible to Tsar Boris, might have been the direct consequence of Tolstoy checking himself against Pushkin, according to Yampolsky.

What made Tsar Boris different from Pushkin's Boris Godunov was the philosophical aspect of its general idea. Tolstoy's Boris was in many ways cast after that of Karamzin, who pictured the doomed ruler's tragedy in metaphysical terms, as being a price he had to pay for his bloody deed. The masses turned away from Boris (as Karamzin and Tolstoy saw it) because of his rapid moral deterioration. Pushkin, on the other hand, regarded Godunov's downfall as natural in the political and social situation of the time. Heavy consciousness didn't help, but had it been clearer, this wouldn't have prevented the Tsar's demise which was inevitable "since what he had to fight after all, was not just the Impostor, but his own people," according to Yampolsky.

==== Chronology issues ====
As in the other two dramas of the trilogy, there are several cases of chronological discrepancies in Tsar Boris. Acts II, III and IV should have been dated 1602 (according to the time of the Danish Prince Johan's arrival in Moscow) and 1604–1605 as for the False Dmitry-related events. Kleshnin who died in 1599, emerges as a participant in the events happening several years later.

There was some of what scholars termed "factual contamination", too. Miranda, the papal nuncio, says things that had been actually pronounced by Pope Clement VIII's legate Allessandro di Comolo who visited Moscow in the times of Fyodor Ioannovich (Karamzin, History, Vol.X, 190). Lachin-bek's speech was that of another Persian ambassador in Russia, Azi Khozrev who (according to Karamzin's History, Vol.X, page 192) said those words in 1593.
