= History of the Russian State from Gostomysl to Timashev =

- Author: Aleksey Konstantinovich Tolstoy
- Original title: История Государства Российского от Гостомысла до Тимашева
- Language: Russian
- Genre: Poem
- Publication date: 1883
- Publication place: Russia
- Media type: Print (Hardback & Paperback)

History of the Russian State from Gostomysl to Timashev (Russian: История Государства Российского от Гостомысла до Тимашева, romanized: Istoriya Gosudarstva Rossiyskogo ot Gostomysla do Timasheva) is a poem in 83 verses by the Russian poet and dramatist Aleksey Konstantinovich Tolstoy, written in 1868. Initially banned by censors and published for the first time in 1883 by Russkaya Starina, eight years after the author's death, it became one of the best known examples of political satire in 19th-century Russia, popular with Russian intellectuals of many generations.

== Background ==
The idea of the poem originated in the times when Tolstoy became greatly interested in Russian history and meditated a lot about how it resonated with his own times. As W.E. Harkins has pointed out, Tolstoy was neither a Slavophile nor a Westernizer, but shared certain views of each camp, admiring both the Western-type constitutional monarchy and the Kievan Rus' period in Russian history, seeing the latter as heroic and progressive. Unlike the Slavophiles, though, he held the Varangian influence in the earliest period of Russian history as beneficial and abhorred the era of the rise of Muscovy which led to the creation of the centralised Russian state and the coming of the Golden Horde, the latter seen by him as the root of all Russian woes. Tolstoy was repelled by the whole of the Russia's history down to and including his own times.

The History of the Russian State was written in 1868 and was inspired by the two poems, which appeared in the 1861 anthology Russian Hidden Literature of the XIX Century, compiled by Nikolay Ogarev in London, one being "The Fairytale", another "As Our Great Novgorod...", the latter by Mikhail Dmitriev. Karamzin's History also served, apparently, as the inspiration. During his Tolstoy's lifetime the poem circulated in hand-written versions, until it first appeared in print in 1883.

=== History ===
The poem was published for the first time by the Russkaya Starina magazine (1883 November issue, pp. 481–496) as The History of the Russian State from Gostomysl. 862-1868. As for to the poem's exact title, the author in his letters referred to it variously, as "L'historie de Russie", "L'historie de Russie jusqu'a Timashev", "The History of Russia". At least four times, in letters to Boleslav Markevich (February 7, November 3, 1869) and Mikhail Stasyulevich (May 20, November 12 of the same year) he used the title History of the Russian State from Gostomysl to Timashev which was later accepted as the final one by the publishers.

The poem's first publication was full of errors, many of which were corrected in the next two issues, No. 12, 1868, and No. 1, 1869 of Russkaya Starina. An article in Novoye Vremya (No. 2780) by Vladimir Zhemchuzhnikov (signed M.V-n) also served to make some amends. Nevertheless, in 1884 the poem was published or, rather, re-printed in Berlin, without taking any of these corrections into account. In 1907 the poem featured in the first edition of The Complete Works by A.K.Tolstoy (Volume 1, pp. 465–477). Pyotr Bykov who compiled it, used the Russkaya Starina text and took the No. 12, 1868, corrections into account, ignoring all others. The process of the restoration of the original text continued for decades. The version that featured in the 1937 edition of the Complete Works by A.K.Tolstoy is considered to be the ultimate one and the text hasn't been change since.

== Plot ==
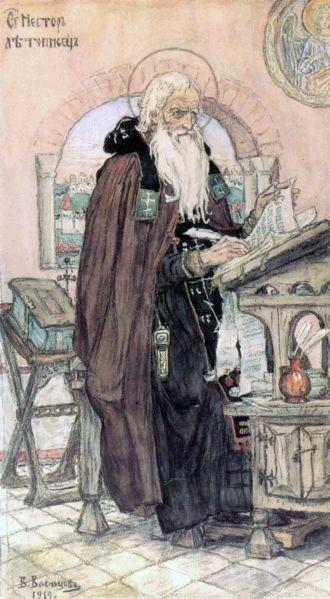
St.Nestor the Chronicler by Viktor Vasnetsov

According to William Harkins, The History of the Russian State should be seen "as an important work by an author who has a very substantial claim to be regarded as Russia's leading humorous poet, and not as a serious or entirely consistent statement of definite ideological position." It begins with a short extract from Nestor's Chronicle (page 8): "Our land is vast and abundant, one thing it lacks is order." The phrase, forming half of Verse 1 (Poslushaite rebyata/Tchto vam rasskazhet ded/Zemlya nasha bogata/Poryadka v nei lish net. - 'Now take a listen children/What grand-dad's have to say/Our land is rich. The Order / Is one thing that it lacks') and is repeated many times later, in a manner of a refrain.

In verses 2-6 Russia's forefathers (Gostomysl, actually, never mentioned), having noticed the fact (as expressed by Nestor) make a decision to bring the Varangians in, to face the task of bringing order to the rich lands of Russia. Verses 7-8 see three brothers, after a short consideration arrive at the scene. The accounts of Ryurik and then Igor, Oleg, Olga and Svaytoslav's deeds (verses 9–14) are marked by the "macaronic" (as W.Hoskins describes it) use of the German language: Nu, dumayut, komanda/Zdes nogu slomit tchort/Es ist je eine Shande/Wir mussen wieder fort. - 'Oh dear, what a fix, they think, here devil will break his leg/It is a shame, and we gotta get out of here!' (Ryurik and his team's first impression of the place).

After Svaytoslav, Vladimir came: "Da endigte fur immer/Die alte Religion" ("Then came an end to the old religion..."), his rationale related in Russian: Perun uzh otchen gadok/Kogda yego spikhnyom/Uvidite, poryadok/Kakoi my zavedyom. ('Perun, you see, is too loathsome. You just see what an Order we'll have once we dethrone him!'). Vladimir dies ("of grief, having failed to bring Order", according to Verse 20) and Yaroslav the Wise marches in: coming close to bringing order, he ends up with breaking the country into fragments, merely for "the love of his children" (Verse 21).

A loather of Mongol's Yoke, Tolstoy then describes the enemy's advent in neutral, jovial manner, reserving most of the bile for the Russian local leaders, quick to report one on another to heir foreign masters (Verse 26).

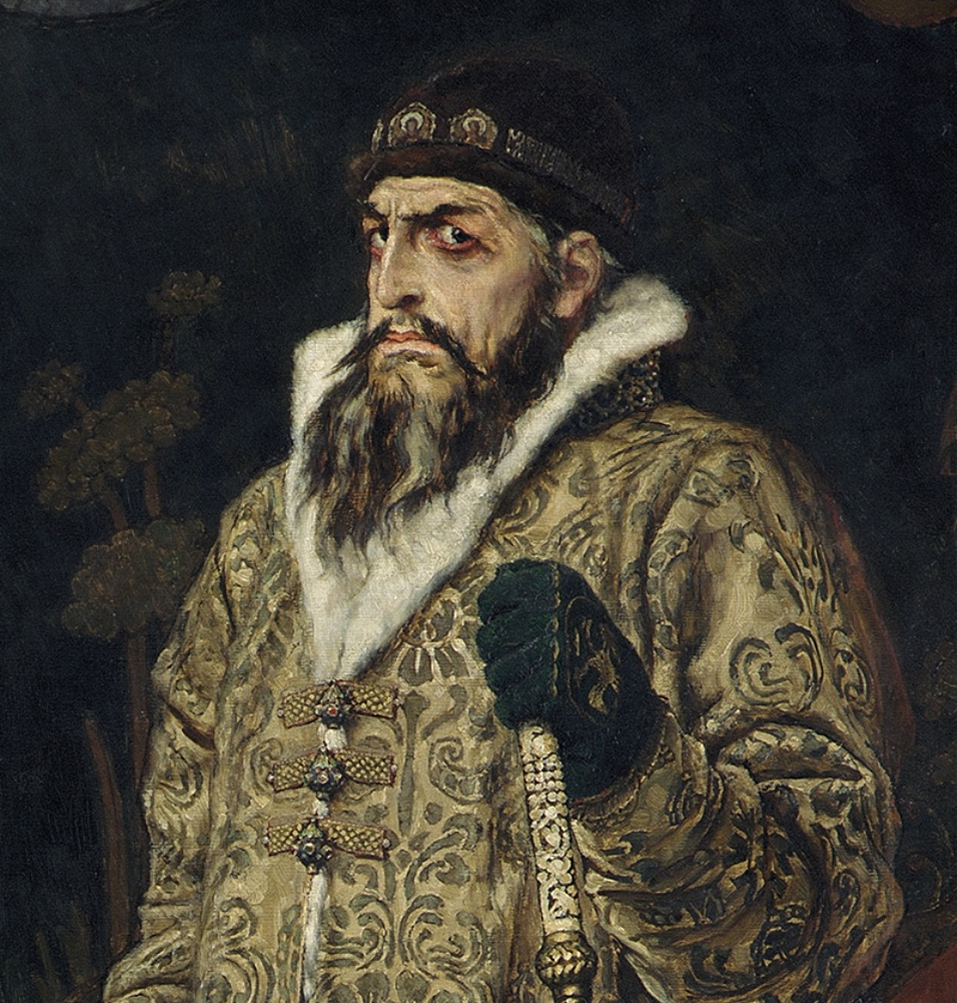
Ivan the Terrible

Ivan III frees Russians from the occupation but still brings none of the Order about, with Ivan IV stepping in. Here Tolstoy's reserve becomes even more apparent: the Grozny's era (which always horrified the author) is described in a tone more ironic than hostile (Ivan Vasilyich Grozny/Emu byl imyarek/Za to shto byl seryozny/Solidny tchelovek). This anti-idyll ends ('One's life'd be rather carefree/With such kind of Tsar/But ah! No thing's eternal/And Tsar Ivan, he died') and in comes Tsar Fyodor, his father's antypode, 'quick not in wits, but words' (Byl razumom ne bodor/trezvo′nit lish gorazd. - Verse 33.) Tsar Boris whose claims to virtue, according to the author, were "serious intelligence", "good looks" and "being a brunette" (Verse 34) is followed by The Impostor (Samozvanets) with a girl. The Poles rioted, were driven off, and Vasiliy came up throne only to be asked "by all the land to instantly come off" which led to another invasion of the Poles who this time brought Cossacks with them ("The Cossack and the Poles/They beat us again and again/And without Tsar we're very down/Like crawfish out of depth"). Minin and Pozharsky emerged to drive the Poles away, and Mikhail got up on throne, still bringing none of the Order expected (Verse 47).

Tsar Aleksey's mission, apparently, was to give birth to Pyotr, and that was when "new times have come to our State", for "Tsar Pyotr indeed loved discipline/Almost like Tsar Ivan" (Verse 48). In search of it, having chosen Amsterdam for his port of call, he's shaven the nations' beards off, "dressed all of us up as Hollanders" and indeed maintained a certain kind of discipline which promptly vanished with his death (Verse 55).

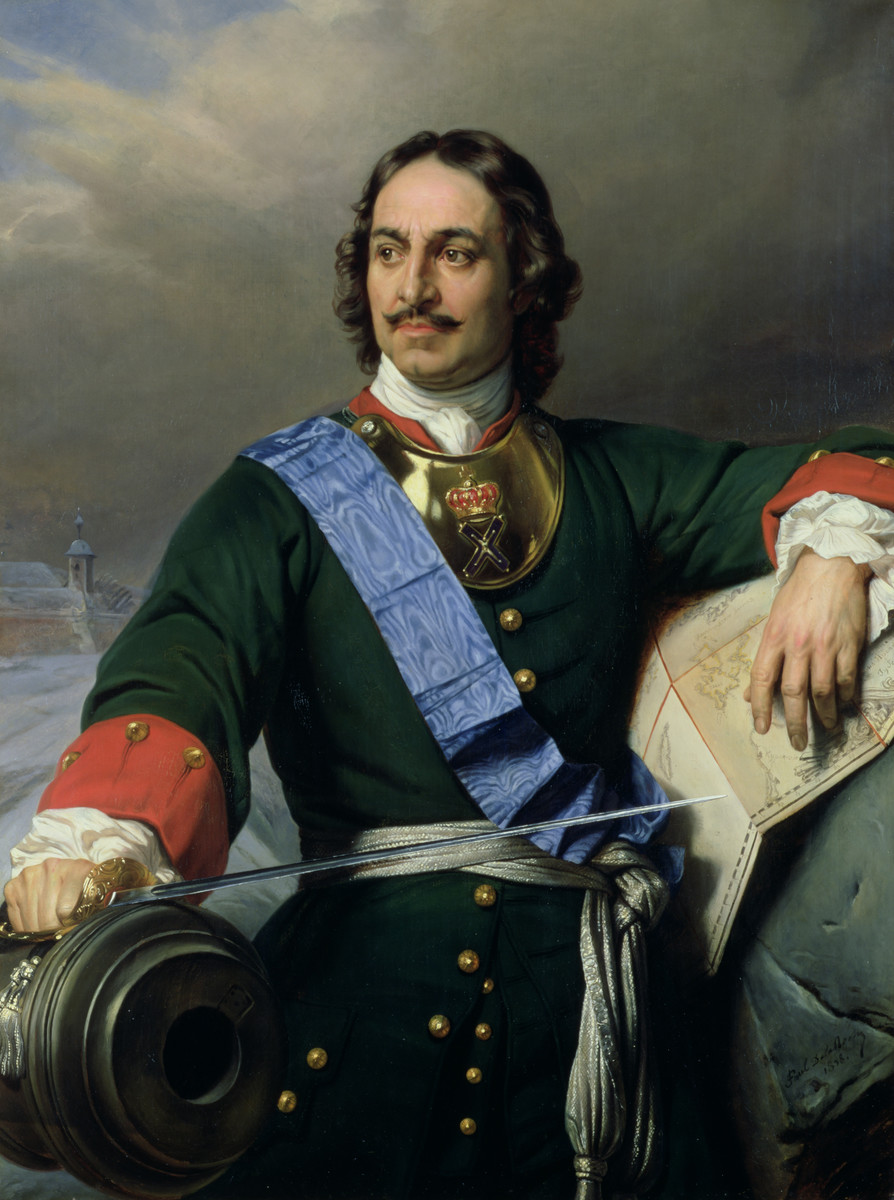
Peter the Great

After that "several tsars were ruling, and even more of queens" (Verse 56), Anna and ('a true gendarme') Biron getting a brief mention. The often quoted Verse 58 provides succinct overview of the most carefree period in post-Peter Russia: Vesyolaya tsaritza/Byla Yelisavet/Poyot y veselitsa/Poryadka tolko net. - 'A merry kind of queen was Queen Elisavet/She sings, she's having fun/And yet the Order's nil.')

Yekaterina comes in, Voltaire and Diderot advice her to grant freedom to her people and this way maintain Order, but... Messieurs, im vozrazila/Ona,vous me comblez/I totchas prikrepila/Ukraintsev k zemle. - 'Messieurs, she retorted/You are being too kind to me/And instantly fastened Ukrainians to land.')

After Pavel I (of the Maltese Order, but with "un-knightly ways") Alexander I came, a man of "week nerves, but gentle manners" whose way of reacting to Napoleon's 1812 advance was a polite retreat. Kazalosya, nu nizhe/Nelzya sidet v dyre/An glyad', uzh my v Parizhe/S Louis le Desire. - 'It seemed, a deeper hole to dwell/Would be hard to find/Then lo! We are in Paris/ With Louis le Désiré') This jubilant point in history sees "Russia's colours flourishing", its land being abundant, but Order still nowhere in sight (Verse 67).

The reason for taking his tale to an abrupt end Tolstoy explains in Verse 68: Poslednee skazanye/Ya b napisal moyo/No tchayu nakazanye,/Boyus monsier Veillot. ('I would have written the final part of my tale, but expect punishment, and the one who frightens me is monsier Veillot'), the latter being the head of a Russian Interior Ministry's Postal Department, with the right to use perlustration. And it was Verse 69 that's made Tolstoy's poem relevant for all the latter times of the Russian history: Hodit' byvayet sklizko/Po kameshkam inym/Itak, o tom tchto blizko/My lutche umoltchim. - 'Some cobbles may prove slippery to be stepped on/So of the things that are close to us we'd rather keep mouths shut.')

Tolstoy ends his poem with a sarcastic paean to Aleksander II's ministers, picturing them as a bunch of children sleighing down the snowy slope. Of them he names just eight, for There's much, so very much of them, one wouldn't recall their names/And going down and down they slide by just one single track.) The poem ends with Tolstoy's preposterously humble address to the Interior Minister Alexander Timashev saying that since his face appeared upon the country like a dawn he introduced the Order to his land. Mentioning Nestor the Chronicler again and slipping totally into parodying the latter's style, Tolstoy asks the reader to correct possible faults of the author for the sake of truth, then concludes: Sostavyl ot bylinok/Rasskaz nemudry sei/Hudyi smirenny inok/Rab bozhy Aleksei. ('Compiled from small bylinas/This quite unwise account/One skinny humble inok/God's slave, named Aleksey.' - Verse 83).
