= 1883 in poetry =

This article covers 1883 in poetry. Nationality words link to articles with information on the nation's poetry or literature (for instance, Irish or France).

== Works published in English ==
=== United Kingdom ===
- William Allingham, The Fairies, including "Up the airy mountain ..."; reprinted from Poems 1850
- Wilfrid Scawen Blunt, The Wind and the Whirlwind
- Robert Bridges, Prometheus the Firegiver
- Robert Browning, Jocoseria
- George Meredith, Poems and Lyrics of the Joy of Earth
- Algernon Charles Swinburne, A Century of Roundels

=== United States ===
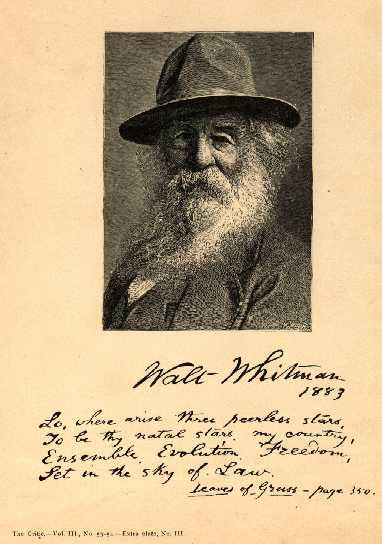
Frontispiece of the 1883 edition of Leaves of Grass by Walt Whitman

- Francis James Child, editor, English and Scottish Popular Ballads, an anthology published in five volumes from this year to 1898
- Mary E. Wilkins Freeman, Decorative Plaques
- Emma Lazarus, "The New Colossus", written in aid of the Bartholdi Pedestal Fund for erection of the Statue of Liberty in New York Harbor
- Henry Wadsworth Longfellow, Michael Angelo, posthumously published
- James Whitcomb Riley, The Old Swimmin'-Hole and 'Leven More Poems
- John Greenleaf Whittier, The Bay of Seven Islands
- Jones Very, Poems, published posthumously
- Ella Wheeler Wilcox, Poems of Passion

== Works published in other languages ==
- Alexander Baumgartner, Lauretanische Litanei, Switzerland
- Gabriele D'Annunzio, L'intermezzo di rime, Italy
- Mihail Eminescu, Luceafărul, Romania
- Victor Hugo, La Légende des siècles, third series (first series 1859, second series 1877), France
- Jan Neruda, Prosté motivy, Czechia
- Aleksey Konstantinovich Tolstoy, History of the Russian State from Gostomysl to Timashev, Russian parody published posthumously
- Paul Verlaine, in November publishes an influential essay on Stéphane Mallarmé, which is later reprinted in the book Les Poetès maudits; France
- Albert Verwey, Persephone, Netherlands

== Births ==
Death years link to the corresponding "[year] in poetry" article:

- January 1 – Charles Badger Clark (died 1957), American
- January 6 – Khalil Gibran (died 1931), Lebanese American poet and artist
- January 21 – Olav Aukrust (died 1929), Norwegian poet and teacher
- February 7 – K. V. Simon, (died 1944), Indian Malayalam-language poet
- February 18
  - Nikos Kazantzakis (died 1957), Greek author
  - Jessie Litchfield, (died 1956), Australian author
- March 13 – Kōtarō Takamura 高村 光太郎 (died 1956), Japanese poet and sculptor; son of sculptor Kōun Takamura
- March 9 – Umberto Saba né Poli (died 1957), Italian poet and fiction writer
- March 16 – Ethel Anderson née Campbell (died 1958), English-born Australian
- March 27 (March 15 O.S.) – Marie Under (died 1980), Estonian
- May 7 – Anna Wickham, née Edith Alice Mary Harper, aka Edith Hepburn and John Oland (committed suicide 1947), English poet brought up in Australia
- June 27 – Geoffrey Studdert Kennedy (died 1929), English Anglican priest and poet
- August 11 – Ernst Stadler (killed 1914 in World War I), German Expressionist poet
- September 16 – T. E. Hulme (killed 1917 in World War I), influential English poetry critic
- September 17 – William Carlos Williams (died 1963), American
- November 10 – Arthur Davison Ficke (died 1945), American
- December 10 – Alfred Kreymborg (died 1966), American poet, novelist, playwright, literary editor and anthologist
- December 12 – William Baylebridge (died 1942)), Australian poet and short-story writer
- September 14 – Marjorie Pickthall (died 1922), English-born Canadian

== Deaths ==
Death years link to the corresponding "[year] in poetry" article:

- January 5 – Charles Tompson (born 1806), Australian public servant said to be the first published Australian-born poet
- May 23 – Cyprian Norwid, 61 (born 1821), Polish-born
- June 14
  - Charles Timothy Brooks, 96, American poet and translator
  - Edward Fitzgerald, 74, English poet and translator, best known for his translation of the Rubáiyát of Omar Khayyám
- After 1883 – George Moses Horton (born c. 1797), African-American

== See also ==
- 19th century in poetry
- 19th century in literature
- List of years in poetry
- List of years in literature
- Victorian literature
- French literature of the 19th century
- Poetry
