= Don Juan (drama) =

1862 drama by Aleksey Konstantinovich Tolstoy

- Written by: Aleksey Konstantinovich Tolstoy
- Original language: Russian
- Genre: Drama

Premiere
- Date premiered: 1905
- Place premiered: Adelgeim brothers troupe

Don Juan (Russian: Дон Жуан) is an 1862 drama by Aleksey Konstantinovich Tolstoy, first published in the April issue of The Russian Messenger magazine. Don Juan never appeared on stage during its author's lifetime. In 1891, its production was deemed "unsuitable" by censors. The play was staged for the first time in 1905 by the Adelgeim Brothers troupe. Later incidental music was written for the play by Eduard Nápravník. Pyotr Tchaikovsky set the "Distant Alpujarra's lights..." piece to music; it is known as "Don Juan's Serenade".

== Background ==
The origins of the play trace back to the end of 1857, when Aleksey K. Tolstoy first got the initial idea. By the summer of 1858 he's written Don Juan's first rough version. On March 20, 1860, he informed his friend, author and translator Boleslav Markevich that he had written and re-written the drama, then read it to critic Vasily Botkin and writer Nikolai Kruze, who gave him their approval. Markevich in his letters criticised some aspects of the play (the need for prologue, the fact that Don Juan doesn't appear in the epilogue, etc.) but his opinions were by and large ignored. In the autumn of 1861, while in Moscow, Tolstoy recited the piece to Mikhail Katkov and Ivan Aksakov; their remarks were found to be to the point and some amends were made to the text. In the end of March 1862 A.K.Tolstoy sent the manuscript to The Russian Messenger wishing to see "not a single word being crossed out" from this final version. His demand was instantly accepted and the poem appeared in the April issue of the magazine.

Tolstoy dedicated his Don Juan drama to Mozart and E. T. A. Hoffmann, since the latter was "the first to see in this character not a philanderer but a seeker of high ideal," as he explained in an 1860 letter to Markevich. As a Romanticist Tolstoy attributed to love the divine meaning, believing it to serve as a link between human soul and higher spheres. Unlike the Tirso de Molina hero, his Don Juan acts in a fashion of a true romantic, looking for love "that helps us see through this wonderful set of universal laws, things of our world's hidden beginnings." Tolstoy made Don Juan closer to Faust; some scene and characters (like that of Satan) point to Goethe influence too.
