= Prince Serebrenni =

1862 novel by Aleksey Konstantinovich Tolstoy

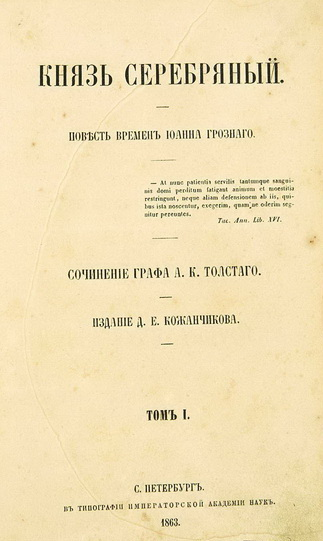
- First edition
- Author: Aleksey Konstantinovich Tolstoy
- Original title: Князь Серебряный
- Language: Russian
- Genre: historical novel
- Publisher: Russky vestnik / Chapmann & Hall
- Publication date: 1862
- Publication place: Russia
- Media type: print (Hardback & Paperback)
- ISBN: 0-543-95808-6

Prince Serebrenni (Russian: Князь Серебряный) is a historical novel by Aleksey Konstantinovich Tolstoy, written in 1859–1861 and first published in The Russian Messenger magazine in 1862 (Nos. 8-10, August–October issues) where it was divided into parts I (chapters 1-19, in No. 8) and II (chapters 20-40, Nos. 9 and 10). Translated by Princess Galitzine for Chapmann & Hall, it came out in English in 1874.

Prince Serebrenni (also known as The Silver Knight, according to the alternative translation), a novel about 16th-century Russia, inspired by the works of Sir Walter Scott and the German Romantics, has become a popular young adult novel in Russia. Acknowledging its limits as a historical document, critics invariably praised the way it "imbued the readership with the ideas of justice, honesty, nobleness and human dignity."

== Background ==
Aleksey Tolstoy had been for years intrigued by the theme which became the book's leitmotif: that of a struggle between Ivan the Terrible, the most cruel of all Russian monarchs, and boyarstvo, a community of high-ranked aristocrats who opposed the Tsar and his tyranny, largely carried out by the Oprichniki. Several of his poems and ballads, notably, Vasily Shibanov and Knyaz Mikhailo Repnin, were investigating this historical dilemma. The death of Nikolai I and the emergence of the new atmosphere of openness prompted Tolstoy to set upon working on the novel about the disaster the absolute monarchy might bring.

=== History ===
Tolstoy started working on Prince Serebrenni in the late 1840s. Several sources reported that in the course of his Kaluga mission alongside senator Davydov, Tolstoy read the novel to Alexandra Smirnova-Rossette and Nikolai Gogol. It was there and then (according to P.A.Kulish) that Gogol told Tolstoy about a folk song "Master Panteley Walks About in the Yard" which has been promptly installed into the plot. According to N.Kolmakov, senator Davydov's senior aide, the novel by this time had been finished. If so, this could apply only to its very first, rough version.

After that, apparently came a long break for there's been not a mention of the novel up until 1855. "I'd like to sit down and write Prince Serebrenny, but still cannot find it in me," Tolstoy complained in a letter to his wife on May 10, 1855. He mentioned it again in his December 13, 1856, letter. By this time the novel has been finished but the author was not pleased with the result.

[The novel]... has to be re-worked and improved stylistically. Serebrenny has to be given more character for he lacks individuality and is more non-descript than any of your 'jeune-premier'. His personality has given me a lot of thought. He is to be simple (in a good way) but brave - but this way he will be very similar to Mitka [an outlaw]. I'd like to make him exceedingly naive, the man who is very noble, totally foreign to all things evil, who cannot see beyond his nose, who can see but one thing and is unable to connect it to the thing that follows. Performed artfully, this trick will make a reader interested.

Again a pause followed and the work resumed in 1859. In a February 4, 1859, letter to his friend and translator Boleslav Markevich Tolstoy wrote: "I've been working upon Serebrenny but failed to finish it, too restless my mind was." Also in 1859 he wrote to Mikhail Pogodin who was asking for a fragment to be included in the Utro anthology: "My novel still needs a clean-up and not even a fragment can be published in its present state. Thousands of small things prevented me from starting upon it." In a March 20, 1860 letter he informed Markevich that the novel was now virtually finished but the second part of it looked much stronger than the first one which needed to be improved.

Prince Serebrenni premiered at a recital party in the Palace in late December 1861. The readings which lasted several days were highly successful and brought the author a book-trinket from Empress consort Maria Aleksandrovna as a personal gift.

=== Sources ===
Prince Serebrenni was the first example in the Russian literature of a historical novel written in the West European tradition. Much in the vein of Sir Walter Scott and Alexandre Dumas' classics, a fictitious character here acts among real historical figures in a thoroughly researched and recreated historical context. The major source for Tolstoy was History of the Russian State by Nikolay Karamzin. It was important for the author to reconstruct Old Russia's real life with its people's language, way of life, customs and habits. Of great use for him were The Russian Tales, Songs of the Russians and Russian Traditional Fairytales, Ivan Sakharov's works, popular at the time. He also used Kaliki Perekhozhye (in Old Russian: Blind minstrels) by Pyotr Bessonov, Spiritual Poems by Viktor Varentsov and The Everyday Life of the Russians by Aleksander Tereschenko.

Aleksey Tolstoy himself was a scholar in the history of Old Russia's folklore; this enabled him, according to biographer Kuleshov, to create a totally plausible panorama of 16th-century Russian life. Critics praised Tolstoy's novel language, a complicated, composite thing built up according to archaic linguistic structures, on the one hand, but laconic and accessible on the other. The author was much worried by future editors' ways of treating his colourful stylings and implored them never to change, say, old 'bogatchestvo' into modern 'bogatstvo' (riches, in Russian) or 'petchalovatsa' into 'petchalitsa' (to mourn or be sad). Being well aware of his novel's shortcomings from a professional historian's point of view, Tolstoy subtitled it: "A Tale of the Terrible times", again much in the folklore vein.

== Synopsis ==
Knyaz (Prince) Nikita Serebryanni is on his way to Moscow. In Medvedevka village his small armed unit of servants clashes with the oprichnik Khomyak’s gang. There and then the Prince learns that bloodshed and lawlessness here were inspired by Tsar Ioann's new policies, known as oprichnina. Another plotline involves Yelena Morozova, the wife of Medvedevka landlord whom the Prince helped out; she turns out to be his own loved one of the old times, who had to marry the old man in order to thwart another vile oprichnik, Vyazemsky, with his unwanted passes. Further on his way, Serebrenni helps out the outlaw named Persten (the latter would repay the Prince by leading him out of Grozny’s jail) and encounters the much feared Tsar himself. Appalled by Boris Godunov's cynicism (the latter suggests that the two should join forces in the anti-Grozny alliance) and torn apart between his righteous hatred towards the Tsar with his corrupt oprichnicks, and his own oath of allegiance, Serebrenni, all kinds of adventures behind, chooses to go to war, to fight for his country (not its amoral ruler), and die the death of a noble man.

== Reception ==
According to the Soviet scholar V.Kuleshov, one notable quality of Aleksey Tolstoy's novel is its artful and concise construction with an elaborate plot, masterfully built and developing dramatically, a host on intrigues intertwining. Each episode reads as a rounded-up piece, fitting neatly into the general scheme. It is this all-embracing net of logic that creates the feel of inevitability of things to come and makes one ponder on the fragility and illusory nature of man's life in a troubled world, argued the critic. Aleksey Tolstoy's weaknesses show when it comes to romantic scenes and when characters begin to act in a melodramatic fashion. He excels at dialogues where, according to Kuleshov, his gift of a dramatist becomes obvious.

The novel was included into the 2013 list 100 Books for Schoolchildren recommended by the Ministry of Education and Science (Russia).

=== Ivan the Terrible character ===
Tolstoy is credited for being the first Russian author to try to recreate Tsar Ioann IV's character in all of its complexity. He portrays the Tsar as a man driven apart by violent extremes, highly intelligent, yet pathologically sadistic, theatrical in behavior (tinged with a morbid sense of humour) and ingenious in his intrigues, a man who one minute may seem full of remorse, yet the other is in a fit of demonic rage. Before Tolstoy, Tsar Ioann was mostly idealized as a builder of "the new Russia", both writers and historians highlighting his victories and rarely focusing on darker sides of his rule. Critics noted, though, that Tolstoy was personally too appalled by the deeds of Tsar Ioann to give him credit for any achievements, social, political or geopolitical, of which there were some. On the other hand, boyars come in the novel as too virtuous for their own good, being portrayed by the author as promoters of sublime moral values.
