= 1858 in poetry =

Nationality words link to articles with information on the nation's poetry or literature (for instance, Irish or France).

== Events ==
- February 20 – Giacomo Meyerbeer pays Mathilde Heine 4,500 francs not to publish four poems by her late husband Heinrich Heine.
- Charles Baudelaire's study on Théophile Gautier is published in Revue contemporaine.

== Works published ==
=== United Kingdom ===
- Cecil Frances Alexander, Hymns Descriptive and Devotional for the Use of Schools
- Matthew Arnold, Merope
- William Barnes, Hwomely Rhymes: A second collection of poems of rural life in the Dorset Dialect
- Elizabeth Rundle Charles, The Voice of Christian Life in Song
- Arthur Hugh Clough, "Amours de Voyage", English poet published in The Atlantic Monthly in the United States (reprinted in the author's posthumous Poems 1862)
- William Johnson Cory, Ionica
- Charles Kingsley, Andromedia, and Other Poems
- Walter Savage Landor, Dry Sticks, Fagoted
- William Morris, The Defence of Guenevere, and Other Poems dedicated to Dante Gabriel Rossetti; the author's first book
- Adelaide Anne Procter, Legends and Lyrics, first series, (1858–61), including "The Lost Chord", set to music by Sir Arthur Sullivan
- Joseph Skipsey "The Pitman Poet", Lyrics
- Catherine Winkworth, Lyra Germanica: Second Series (see also Lyra Germanica 1855)

=== United States ===
- Thomas Bailey Aldrich, The Course of True Love Never Did Run Smooth
- Arthur Hugh Clough, "Amours de Voyage", English poet published in The Atlantic Monthly in the United States (reprinted in the author's posthumous Poems 1862)
- James T. Fields, A Few Verses for a Few Friends
- William J. Grayson, The Country
- Oliver Wendell Holmes, The Autocrat of the Breakfast-Table, essays
- Henry Wadsworth Longfellow, The Courtship of Miles Standish and Other Poems
- Frances Harper, "Bury Me in a Free Land", November 20

=== Other in English ===
- Thomas D'Arcy McGee, Canadian Ballads, Montreal, Canada

=== Other languages ===
- Alphonse Daudet, Les Amoureuses, France
- Aleksey K. Tolstoy, Vasily Shibanov, Russia

== Births ==
Death years link to the corresponding "[year] in poetry" article:

- January 24 – Constance Naden (died 1889), English poet and philosopher
- June 1 – William Wilfred Campbell (died 1918), Canadian
- June 16 – Isabel Richey (died 1910), American
- July 1 – Velma Caldwell Melville (died 1924), American editor and writer
- August 2 – Sir William Watson (died 1935), English
- August 15 – Edith Nesbit (died 1924), English author and poet
- September 5 – Victor Daley (died 1905), Australian
- Also:
  - Balashankar (died 1899), Indian, Gujarati-language poet
  - Dollie Radford, née Caroline Maitland (died 1920), English poet and writer, wife of Ernest Radford

== Deaths ==
Death years link to the corresponding "[year] in poetry" article:

- December 18 – Thomas Holley Chivers (born 1807), American

== See also ==
- 19th century in poetry
- 19th century in literature
- List of years in poetry
- List of years in literature
- Victorian literature
- French literature of the 19th century
- Poetry
