= Six Romances, Opus 38 (Tchaikovsky) =

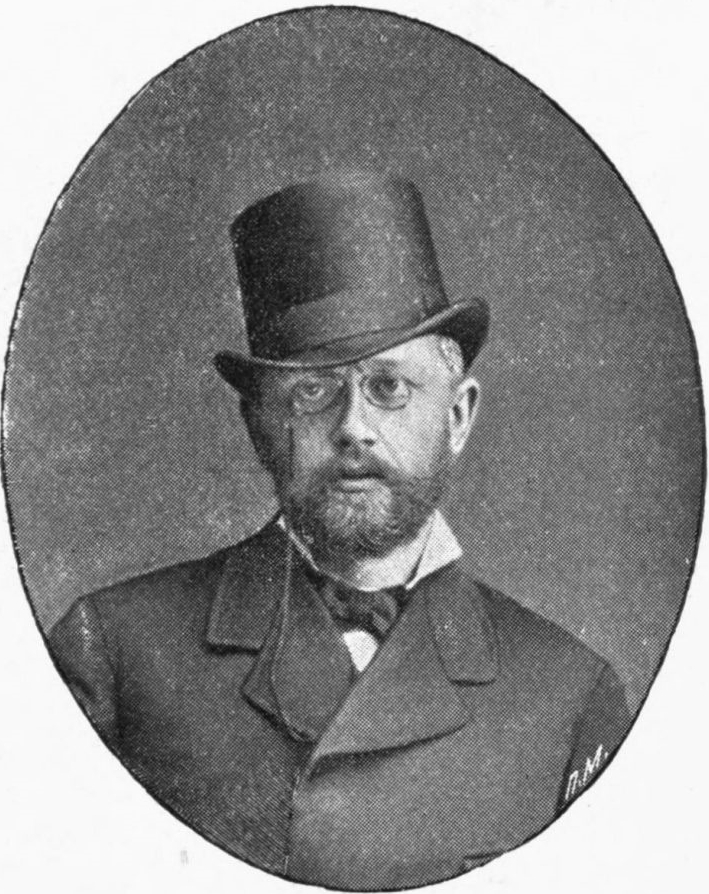

The opus Six Romances was composed in 1878 by Pyotr Ilyich Tchaikovsky (1840 – 1893) for voice and piano, and was published as Opus 38 later that year. Of these six songs, "Don Juan's Serenade" was the most successful, becoming one of the best-known works among the approximately 100 romances that Tchaikovsky composed during his lifetime.

At this point in his life, the composer was rebounding from a personal crisis, having married and quickly separated the year before. Tchaikovsky characterized the creation of this opus as "something between relaxation and work".

== List of six songs ==
Opus 38 consists of the following six songs, with tempo indicated in Italian:

Don Juan's Serenade
Sung in 1904 by Mario Ancona (3:10)

Don Juan's Serenade
Sung in 1914 by Enrico Caruso (3:03)

Pimpinella
Sung in 1913 by Caruso (2:58)

1. Don Juan's Serenade (Серенада Дон-Жуана), Allegro non tanto (B minor, 164 bars)
2. It was in the Early Spring (То было раннею весной), Allegro moderato (E♭ major, 101 bars)
3. Amid the Din of the Ball (Средь шумного бала), Moderato (B minor, 99 bars)
4. O, If Only You Could (О, если б ты могла), Allegro agitato (D major, 38 bars)
5. The Love of a Dead Man (Любовь мертвеца), Andante non tanto (F major, 129 bars)
6. Pimpinella: Florentine Song (Пимпинелла: Флорентинская песня), Allegretto molto moderato (G major, 135 bars)

== Origin of lyrics ==
The lyrics of the first four songs are from writings of Aleksey Konstantinovich Tolstoy (1817 – 1875), the Russian poet, novelist and playwright. For example, the first song is based on Tolstoy's 1862 drama Don Juan.

The lyrics for "The Love of a Dead Man" are from Mikhail Lermontov (1814 – 1841), the Russian writer, poet and painter. And, the lyrics for "Pimpinella" are by Tchaikovsky, based upon a Florentine popular song.

== Composition and dedication ==
The six songs are not in chronological order of composition. He wrote the last two ("The Love of a Dead Man" and "Pimpinella") while visiting Florence in February and March 1878, respectively. Later, he wrote the first four songs (based on Tolstoy) in May 1878 while visiting the Ukrainian estate of his benefactor, Nadezhda von Meck (1831 – 1894), who previously suggested he might want to put Tolstoy to music.

The opus was dedicated to Anatoly, one of the composer's brothers, in gratitude for helping Tchaikovsky through a difficult emotional period in 1877. It was during that year when the composer married and separated from Antonina Miliukova (1848 – 1917).
