= The Dream of Councillor Popov =

1878 satire in verse by Aleksey Konstantinovich Tolstoy

The Dream of Councillor Popov (Сон статс-советника Попова; also – Сон Попова) is a satire in verse by Aleksey Konstantinovich Tolstoy, first published in 1878 in Berlin, and regarded as one of the best satirical poems in Russian literature, mixing "sharp, poignant satire… and pure delight in cheerful absurdity". According to critic D.S.Mirsky, "it is The Dream… that can be seen as Aleksey Tolstoy's most solid claim for immortality".

== History ==
The poem was written in the summer of 1873 and became widely popular, having spread all around the country as a hand-written manuscript. It was generally believed at the time that the target of its satire had been Interior minister Pyotr Valuev, a conservative politician keen to create for himself an image of a liberal, by using colourful rhetoric. Later it emerged that was more of an aggregate character, at least one other minister, A.V.Golovin, having been mentioned as a possible prototype.

The poem was first published, as a brochure, in 1878 in Berlin, under the title The Dream of State Councillor Popov. In Russia the poem came out in 1882, #12 issue of Russkaya starina magazine (pp.107-712), dated (wrongly) 1874. It was greatly praised by many prominent authors of the time, including Ivan Turgenev and Leo Tolstoy. "Its irresistible. I just can’t help reading you this… and Lev Nikolayevich was beginning to recite Popov’s Dream, causing occasional outbursts of laughter", P.A.Sergienko remembered.

In November 1875 the recital of Popov's Dream was banned from being performed at the evening commemorating Aleksey Tolstoy, organized by the Russian Literary Fund. All public renditions of the poem were impossible until 1915, when the ban was officially lifted.
