= John of Damascus (poem) =

John of Damascus (Иоанн Дамаскин) is a poem by Aleksey Konstantinovich Tolstoy, first published in the January, No.1, 1859 issue of Russkaya Beseda magazine. Fragments of the poem have been put to music by several composers, among them Pyotr Tchaikovsky, Sergei Taneyev and Vasily Kalinnikov.

== Background ==
The main source for Tolstoy was the zhitie (life story) of theologian and hymnographer John of Damascus. The poem's leitmotif, that of the poet's role as related to the state authorities, for Tolstoy, who was still at the Court, was a serious personal matter. Nikolai Leskov referred to the poem as an autobiographical piece of work of an author who was eager to leave the Court and become a "free artist".

Tolstoy himself was critical of the poem's beginning and also its Chapter 7. In a letter to Ivan Aksakov on 31 December 1858 he wrote: "The epic side is not for me, lyricism and occasionally drama draw me away."

=== Controversy ===
The poem caused controversy. The Moscow censorship committee at the request of the 3rd Department ordered the circulation of the Russkaya Beseda to be stopped for the poem to be withdrawn from the edition, which had already been printed. Evgraf Kovalevsky, the Minister of Education, issued a special order, permitting the publication which outraged the head of the 3rd Department, Prince Vasily Dolgorukov. Details of this conflict were related by the latter's son N.V. Dolgorukov in one of his 1863 articles.

According to biographer Dmitry Zhukov, Dolgorukov, informed of the forthcoming publication by the Interior Minister Alexander Timashev's agents, ordered to stop the print. Ivan Aksakov sent the proofread lists to Kovalevsky immediately. The latter, knowing already that Empress consort Maria Alexandrovna's impression of the poem had been favourable, ordered the censorship committee to permit the publication. Dolgorukov was outraged: "How could you have done this without informing me first?" "You are not the Prime Minister to demand of me any such thing," Kovalevsky retorted, reportedly. According to the archives, it was Alexander II who, having heard of Ioann Damaskin, asked censors to pay "special attention" to the poem. Kovalevsky sent his personal report to the emperor, stating: "Only some verses, taken out of context might have caused suspicion; otherwise the general idea, the implementation of it, everything about this poem, permeated with the spirit of Early Christianity, dispels doubts."
