= The Death of Ivan the Terrible =

1866 work by Aleksey Konstantinovich Tolstoy

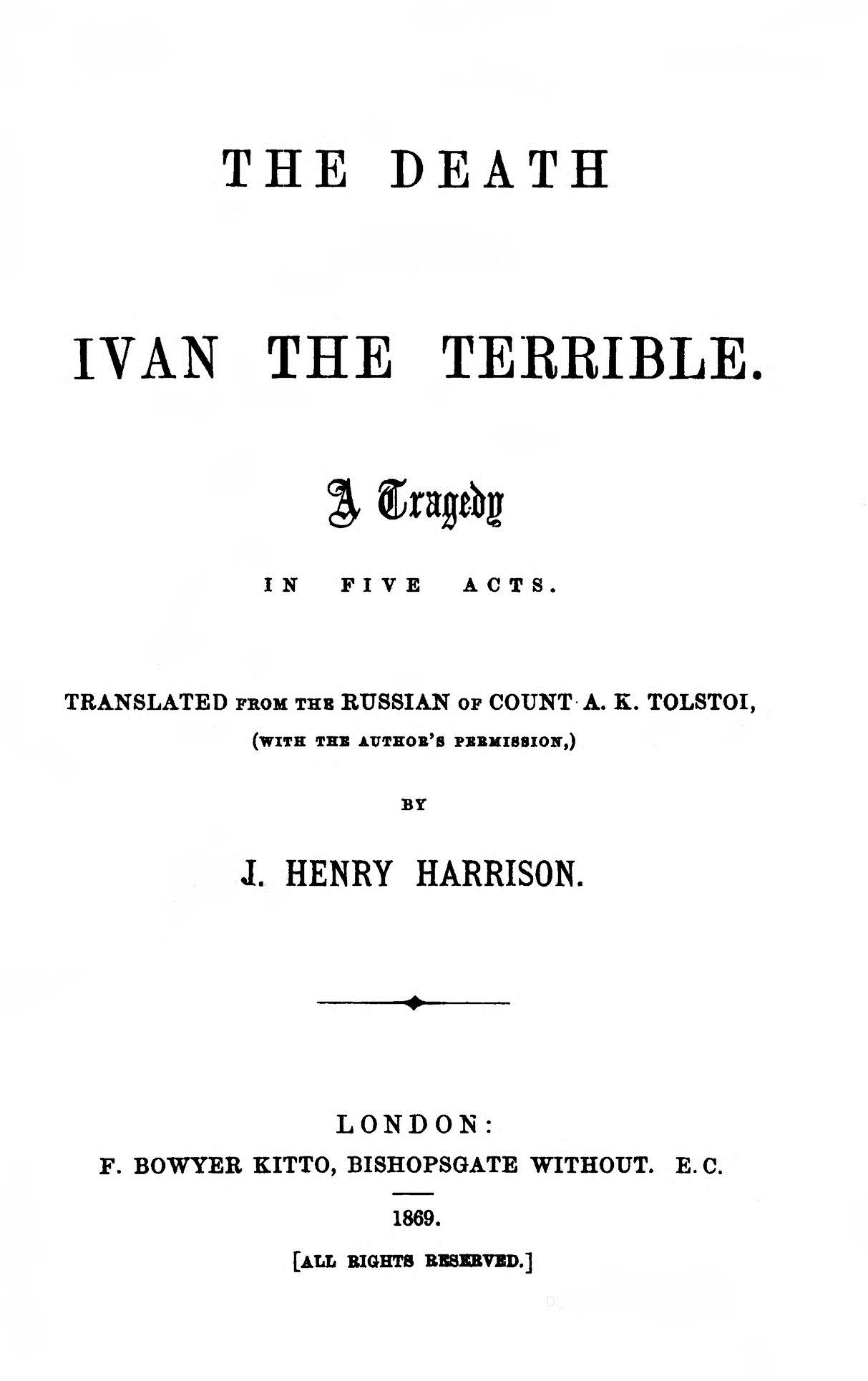
- F.B.Kitto, London, 1869
- Original language: Russian
- Written by: Aleksey Konstantinovich Tolstoy
- Genre: Historical drama

Premiere
- Date: 1867
- Place: Alexandrinsky Theatre, Saint Petersburg

The Death of Ivan the Terrible (Russian: Смерть Иоанна Грозного, romanized: Smertʹ Ioanna Groznovo) is a historical drama by Aleksey Konstantinovich Tolstoy written in 1863 and first published in the January 1866 issue of Otechestvennye zapiski magazine. It is the first part of a trilogy that is followed by Tsar Fiodor Ioannovich and concludes with Tsar Boris. All three plays were banned by the censor. It dramatises the story of Ivan IV of Russia and is written in blank verse. Tolstoy was influenced by the work of William Shakespeare in writing the trilogy, which formed the core of his reputation as a writer in the Russia of his day and as a dramatist to this day.

== Background ==
In the early 1863 Aleksey Tolstoy informed Yakov Polonsky in a letter from Dresden that he was working upon "a large poem in verse The Death of Ioann Grozny… Two acts of it are being finished and, as people tell me, are good", he added. The deterioration of health hindered the creative process, but Act 3 was completed by the summer of that year and in the end of 1863 the play was virtually ready.

Some details as to the original draft of it have been traced through Tolstoy's correspondence with Karolina Pavlova who was translating the text into German, and was being asked to make changes according to those Tolstoy was making to his original text. Some of the scenes that have been excluded by the author from the final version of the play looked significant, one being Boris Godunov's conversation with tsarina Anastasia Romanovna about her granting him trusteeship right over Dmitry after Ioann and Fyodor's respective deaths. Also cut has been the scene of Godunov's talk with Dmitry's nanny. Both, according to Tolstoy, precipitated Tsar Fiodor Ioannovich, the second play of the trilogy and both have made their way into it later, although, as critics noticed, some fragments of which exactly the same could be said have been kept in the original text.

Making preparations for the first separate edition of the play, which came in November, 1866, Tolstoy again made changes. In the magazine version in both scenes of Act 1 there's been no mention of any negotiations with the British ambassador. The final Zakharyin's words ("Forgive us all! Here's the price we have to pay for edinovlastye, for our own corruption") also appeared for the first time in the book version, summing up what was obviously the drama's main idea. Tolstoy was taking into account other people's opinions he was becoming aware of. In the Act 5 he dropped some archaisms and also several of the skomorokhs’ couplets, so as to avoid the unwanted comic effect.

=== Sources ===
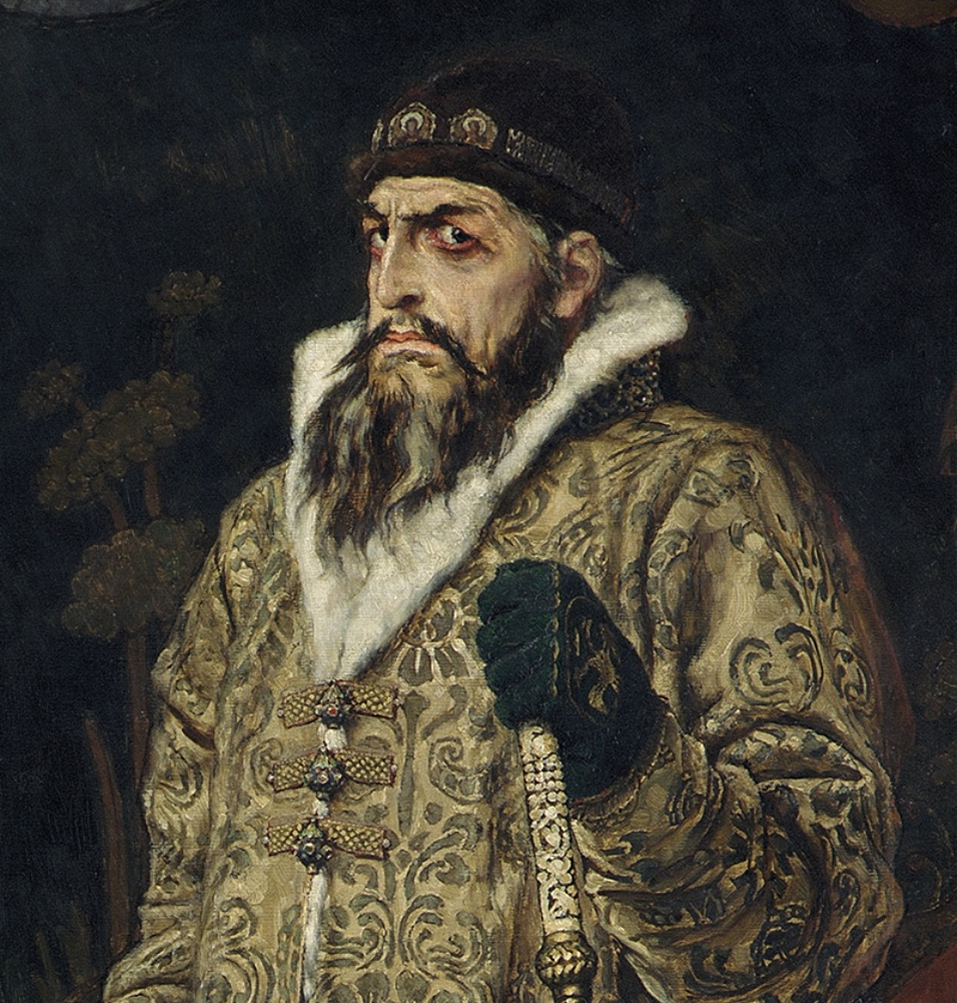
Ivan the Terrible by Viktor Vasnetsov, 1897

The major source for Tolstoy as he was working upon the drama (as it was with the whole trilogy) was History of the Russian State by Nikolay Karamzin. The whole of the Act 1 is based upon one small fragment in Vol.IX of it describing Ioann's feelings after the killing of his son, his relinquishing the throne, boyars' reaction to this and his consent to (as he put it) "bear this burden of rule for some more time" Details of this fragment of History have been expanded by Tolstoy into full-blown scenes: Zakharyev addressing boyars, Ioann's musing on the possibility of taking a schema oath, his conversation with boyars. The messengerэs tale in the Scene 2, Act 1 was based upon Karamzin's description of the Pskov siege which Tolstoy has taken numerous details from, moving them together, chronologically. The Garaburda scene (exceptionally important for the play's structure, according to the author's "Production plan") has been totally made up, but again, some details involved have been taken from Karamzin (Mikhail Garaburda's negotiations with Grozny in 1573, among others).

Apart from Karamzin's History Tolstoy used, albeit to a lesser extent, Tales of Prince Kurbsky, published in 1831 by N.Ustryalov. Kurbsky's letters in Scene 2, Act 1, present a mosaic of his real letters, the 1679 one featuring most prominently. In the Act 4 the Ivan Grozny synodic text reading quotes a real document. The play's major characters are historical figures, most of the minor ones (servants, stolniks) are fictional. One notable exception is a Pskovian messenger, a figure featuring in historical chronicles. The Boyar duma members have names of real people, one exception being Sitsky, a totally fictitious part.

==== Inaccuracies and inventions ====
According to Tolstoy, the action of drama takes place in 1584, the year of Ioann's death. Yet, Ivan's murdering his son, the abdication, the siege of Pskov, the fire in Aleksandrovskaya sloboda all relate to the second half of 1581. Tolstoy was improvising a lot when it came to motives and undercurrents, occasionally creating links between things historians thought were unrelated. Having greatly increased the historical role of Boris Godunov, he's made him take part in several events he had no bearing to. According to I.Yampolsky, Boris' speech in the Duma, the clash with Sitsky, addressing Tsar Ivan on behalf of the Duma asking for his return to the throne, his opposition to the monarch's marrying Princess of Hastings and unwilling support for tsarina Maria, Ivan's advice for Fyodor to always listen to what Boris would say, - were all the author's artistic inventions.

The idea of expanding it into a trilogy came to Tolstoy while he was working on Tsar Fyodor Ioannovich, but, as I.Yampolsky notes, The Death of Ioann the Terrible gives the impression of some future development of Godunov's character already having been on author's mind. The appearance of Mikhail Bityagovsky in the play, the figure which according to historical sources would come upon the scene many years later, could be seen as pointing to this, too. Besides, Tolstoy created new logical threads between Bityagovsky's taking part in the conflict between Boris and boyars, his agitation of the people against Shuisky and Belsky - to the murder of Dmitry.

== Production history ==
The Death of Ivan the Terrible was first performed at the Alexandrinsky Theatre in Saint Petersburg in 1867. It was not a success, due to the lead role having been given to a comic actor.

The world-famous Moscow Art Theatre began its second season with a production of the play, which opened on 29 September 1899. It was directed by the seminal theatre practitioner Constantin Stanislavski, who also played the lead role initially. When Stanislavski fell ill after the first few performances, he was replaced by Vsevolod Meyerhold.

The play received its first New York production in 1904, which opened on 1 March at the New Amsterdam Theatre on Broadway in a translation by S. R. DeMeissner.

== Sources ==
- Banham, Martin, ed. 1998. The Cambridge Guide to Theatre. Cambridge: Cambridge UP. ISBN 0-521-43437-8.
- Benedetti, Jean. 1999. Stanislavski: His Life and Art. Revised edition. Original edition published in 1988. London: Methuen. ISBN 0-413-52520-1.
- Braun, Edward. 1995. Meyerhold: A Revolution in Theatre. Rev. 2nd ed. London: Methuen. ISBN 0-413-72730-0.
- Eriksen, Gordon, Garrard MacLeod, and Martin Wisneski, ed. 1960. Encyclopædia Britannica 15th Edition. Volume 11.
- Hartnoll, Phyllis, ed. 1983. The Oxford Companion to the Theatre. 4th ed. Oxford: Oxford UP. ISBN 0-19-211546-4.
- Moser, Charles A., ed. 1992. The Cambridge History of Russian Literature. Rev. ed. Cambridge: Cambridge UP. ISBN 0-521-42567-0.
- Tolstoy, Aleksey Konstantinovich (Alexis K. Tolstoi). 1926. The Death of Ivan the Terrible: A Drama in Verse. Trans. Alfred Hayes. London: Kegan Paul, Trench, Trubner.
- ---. 1933. The Death of Ivan the Terrible: A Tragedy in Five Acts. Trans. George Rapall Noyes. In Masterpieces of the Russian Drama. Ed. George Rapall Noyes. Vol. 2. New York: Appleton/Dover. 457–546.
- Worrall, Nick. 1996. The Moscow Art Theatre. Theatre Production Studies ser. London and NY: Routledge. ISBN 0-415-05598-9.
