= Tsar Fyodor Ioannovich =

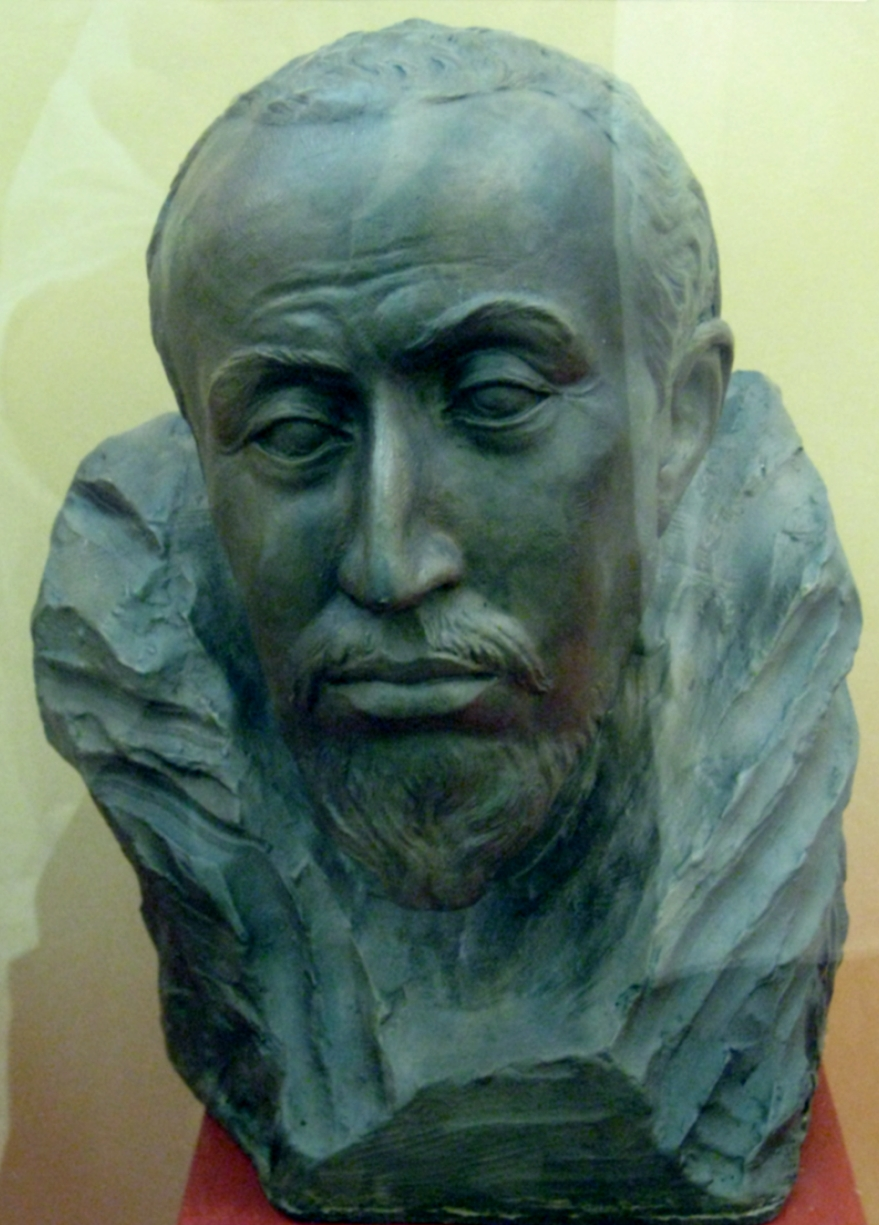
- Forensic facial reconstruction of Tsar Fyodor Ioannovich, by M. Gerasimov (1963).
- Original language: Russian
- Written by: Aleksey Konstantinovich Tolstoy
- Genre: Historical drama

Premiere
- Date: 12 October 1898
- Place: Suvorin's theatre, Saint Petersburg

Tsar Fyodor Ioannovich (Russian: Царь Фёдор Иоаннович, old orthography: Царь Ѳедоръ Іоанновичъ) is an 1868 historical drama by Aleksey Konstantinovich Tolstoy. It is the second part of a trilogy that begins with The Death of Ivan the Terrible and concludes with Tsar Boris. All three plays were banned by the censor. Tsar Fyodor is written in blank verse and was influenced by the work of William Shakespeare, Casimir Delavigne, and Edward Bulwer-Lytton. It dramatises the story of Feodor I of Russia, whom the play portrays as a good man who is a weak, ineffectual ruler. The trilogy formed the core of Tolstoy's reputation as a writer in the Russia of his day and as a dramatist to this day. It has been considered Tolstoy's masterpiece.

Tsar Fyodor Ioannovich was first performed in an amateur production in Saint Petersburg in 1890. It received its first professional production at Suvorin's theatre in Saint Petersburg on 12 October 1898, directed by P. P. Gnedich. Two days later on 14 October, the play was performed as the inaugural production of the world-famous Moscow Art Theatre, directed by Constantin Stanislavski, with Ivan Moskvin in the lead role and Vsevolod Meyerhold as Prince Vasiliy Shuisky. Since then the play has been revived frequently. Incidental music was written for the play by Alexander Ilyinsky.

== Sources ==
- Banham, Martin, ed. 1998. The Cambridge Guide to Theatre. Cambridge: Cambridge UP. ISBN 0521434378.
- Benedetti, Jean. 1999. Stanislavski: His Life and Art. Revised edition. Original edition published in 1988. London: Methuen. ISBN 0413525201.
- Braun, Edward. 1995. Meyerhold: A Revolution in Theatre. Rev. 2nd ed. London: Methuen. ISBN 0413727300.
- Eriksen, Gordon, Garrard MacLeod, and Martin Wisneski, ed. 1960. Encyclopædia Britannica 15th Edition. Volume 11.
- Hartnoll, Phyllis, ed. 1983. The Oxford Companion to the Theatre. 4th ed. Oxford: Oxford UP. ISBN 0192115464.
- Moser, Charles A., ed. 1992. The Cambridge History of Russian Literature. Rev. ed. Cambridge: Cambridge UP. ISBN 0521425670.
- Tolstoy, Aleksey Konstantinovich. 1922. Tsar Fiodor Ioannovich: A Play in Five Acts. Trans. Jenny Covan. The Moscow Art Theatre Series of Russian Plays ser. Ed. Oliver M. Sayler. New York: Brentanos. Available online.
- Worrall, Nick. 1996. The Moscow Art Theatre. Theatre Production Studies ser. London and NY: Routledge. ISBN 0415055989.
