= Dragon (poem) =

Dragon (Дракон) is a poem by Aleksey Konstantinovich Tolstoy, written in the spring and summer of 1875 and first published in Vestnik Evropy October (#10) 1875 issue (pp. 581-605). The poem (consisting of 193 three-liners) was subtitled "A 12th-century tale. From the Italian" and dedicated to Yakov Polonsky.

In July 1875 Tolstoy met Ivan Turgenev and Mikhail Stasyulevich in Karlsbad and read them the poem. According to the latter, all three discussed whether it was advisable to refer to as "translated from Italian" something that was in fact the original Russian text. "Let Angelo de Gubernatis scratch his head, digging in old archives, searching for the original", Tolstoy exclaimed, laughing. Still he made a compromise: in the "translated from Italian" phrase the first word was dropped.

The Dragon, as Tolstoy saw it, had one serious merit. "The best thing about this story is that it presents as rather plausible a kind of occurrence that would be quite impossible", he wrote in a letter to Princess Sayn-Wittgenstein.
