= The Vampire (novella) =

Gothic novella by Aleksey Konstantinovich Tolstoy

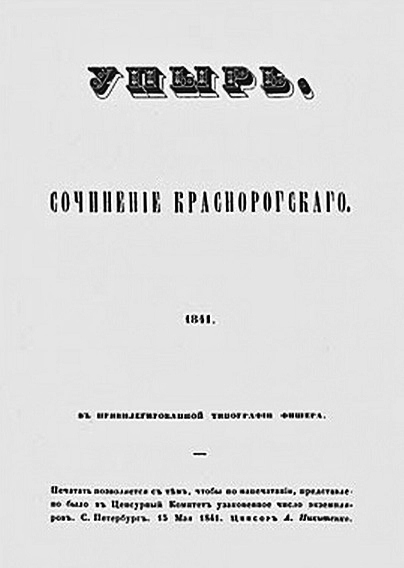
- First edition title page
- Author: Aleksey Konstantinovich Tolstoy
- Original title: Упырь
- Language: Russian
- Genre: Gothic fiction
- Publisher: Fisher, Saint Petersburg
- Publication date: 1841
- Publication place: Russia
- Media type: Print (Paperback & Hardback)

The Vampire (Russian: Упырь, Oupyr) is a gothic novella by Aleksey Konstantinovich Tolstoy, first published in Saint Petersburg in 1841 under the pseudonym of Krasnorogsky.

== Background ==
The inspiration for the story was Tolstoy's reminiscences of his stay in Como, Italy, in 1838. He wrote of this to his wife in April 1872, mentioning the villa Remondi, a girl named Pepina and other details. On April 9, 1841, Tolstoy read The Vampire at Vladimir Sollogub's; the reading was mentioned by Pyotr Pletnyov in a letter to Yakov Grot. In early May 1841 Tolstoy sent the manuscript to censor Aleksandr Nikitenko to be reviewed. On May 15 he was granted permission to publish it.

The novella was poorly received by critics, discouraging Tolstoy from publishing three other vampire-themed works that he had written at the time. One of these, a story titled "Amena", was published in 1846, while the other two were only published posthumously. Tolstoy's writing on the subject of vampires was at least partly influenced by The Vampyre by John William Polidori, which had been published in Russian translation in Moscow in 1828.

== Critical reception ==
Vissarion Belinsky liked the novella, recognizing in it "all the signs of a gift, still very young, but quite remarkable." Youthfulness, as he saw it, manifested itself in "too ardent and intense an imagination which is yet to be tempered by life experience and be balanced by the other qualities of the soul." Unlike the works of E. T. A. Hoffmann whom he admired, Belinsky regarded Tolstoy's creation as lacking intellectual depth. "Despite the superficial nature of this invention, the multifacetedness and intricacy of it belie great strength of imagination in the author, while his masterful rendition and the ability to draw characters out of mere faces and catch the spirit of the place and time... along with his beautiful, often poetic language, bear the mark of a strong literary hand," Belinsky wrote.

== English translation ==
- Vampires: Stories of the Supernatural (includes The Vampire and three other related tales by Tolstoy), Hawthorn Books, 1973. ISBN 080158292X
