= Vasily Shibanov =

Vasily Shibanov is a poem by Aleksey Konstantinovich Tolstoy, written in the late 1840s and first published in the September 1858 issue of The Russian Messenger magazine. The poem, a folk ballad in both structure and tone, deals with a real episode in the history of the 16th century Russian Empire, namely the defection of Prince Kurbsky to the Grand Duchy of Lithuania and the way he sent the damning letter to Ivan the Terrible with his servant Shibanov, which meant imminent death for the latter.

== Background ==
For a source Tolstoy used the fragment of Nikolay Karamzin's History of the Russian State relating how "…Kurbsky by night clandestinely left his home, climbed over the city wall, found two of the horses his loyal servant prepared for him and safely reached Volmar, then under the Lithuanians." Received warmly by Sigismund II Augustus's men, Kurbsky sat down to write a letter (first of the three) to the Russian Tsar and then sent it with his stremyanny (the senior cavalry servant), who earlier helped him to escape from Moscow.

According to the History, what Ivan the Terrible did first was hit and pierce the messenger's foot with his sharp baton, so as to nail him down to the floor, then asked one of his men to read the letter, Shibanov all the while standing nearby, profusely bleeding. The reading finished, Ivan, keen on learning everything about the fugitive's allies in Moscow, ordered the messenger to be taken to the torture chamber. According to Karamzin, "...the virtuous servant, named Vasily Shibanov, betrayed nobody. Suffering greatly, he praised his master, saying how happy he was to die for him."

=== The Letter ===
The source of the verses 11 and 12 was the text of Kurbsky's letter, published in Prince Kurbsky's Tales (1833). In Tolstoy's rendition the fragment of the letter goes as follows:

And now I address you, Tsar, who's been praised from times immemorial and who's now sinking in bestiality. Tell me, you madman, why, for what sins, did you come to destroy the best and the strongest of your men? Answer this: were it not those men who, in hard fought wars have crushed numerous enemy’s citadels? Is it not their bravery that's brought you your present glory? Who can equal then in their loyalty?

You madman, who's been tempted into unspoken heresy! Could it be that you deem yourself less mortal than us? Now hear this: the hour of revenge, foretold by the Writ, will come. Me, who poured blood for your sake as if it were water, will come to stand by my Judge, but you too will be standing there beside me!

Царю, пославляему древле от всех,
Но тонущу в сквернах обильных!
Ответствуй, безумный, каких ради грех
Побил еси добрых и сильных?
Ответствуй, не ими ль, средь тяжкой войны,
Без счета твердыни врагов сражены?
Не их ли ты мужеством славен?
И кто им бысть верностью равен?

Безумный! Иль мнишись бессмертнее нас,
В небытную ересь прельщенный?
Внимай же! Приидет возмездия час,
Писанием нам предреченный,
И аз, иже кровь в непрестанных боях
За тя, аки воду, лиях и лиях,
С тобой пред судьею предстану!"
Так Курбский писал к Иоанну.

=== Vasily Shibanov's death ===
In the poem, once the reading is over, the Tsar's look becomes enigmatic and dark, tinged with something that looks like sorrow. Totally in control, he makes a dramatic confession.

Yes, your master is right. Not a moment of joy I’ll have in this life. For indeed I did trample down under my feet the blood of the best, the strongest of my men. From then on I’m nothing but a stinking beast.

His mood changes, but the last words Vasily Shibanov hears from him sound calm, rational and tinged with a mix of respect, sympathy and morbid irony. Ivan the Terrible says:

No, messenger, you are not a slave. You are a friend and an ally. And Kurbsky, obviously, must have got many of such - for otherwise would he have betrayed you this way, for nothing? Now you'll go to jail, and you, Malyuta, follow him.

И молвил так царь: "Да, боярин твой прав,
И нет уж мне жизни отрадной,
Кровь добрых и сильных ногами поправ,
Я пес недостойный и смрадный!

Гонец, ты не раб, но товарищ и друг,
И много, знать, верных у Курбского слуг,
Что выдал тебя за бесценок!
Ступай же с Малютой в застенок!"

In his last moment Shibanov, implores God to forgive both his master's treason (only mentioning personal betrayal) and his own sins, then prays for his Tsar and his country:

O Prince, who could betray me for just one sweet moment of reproach. Prince, I pray my God to forgive you your treason. My God, please hear me as my end comes near. My tongue is numb, my eye dim, my heart full of love and forgiveness. Forgive me my sins! My God, please hear me as my end comes near. Forgive my master. My tongue is numb, my eye dim, but my word would be the same. God, for the terrible Tsar do I pray, for our sacred great Rus, as I stand firm, awaiting death I've been longing for.

"О князь, ты, который предать меня мог
За сладостный миг укоризны,
О князь, я молю, да простит тебе бог
Измену твою пред отчизной!
Услышь меня, боже, в предсмертный мой час,
Язык мой немеет, и взор мой угас,
Но в сердце любовь и прощенье,
Помилуй мои прегрешенья!

Услышь меня, боже, в предсмертный мой час,
Прости моего господина!
Язык мой немеет, и взор мой угас,
Но слово мое все едино:
За грозного, боже, царя я молюсь,
За нашу святую, великую Русь,
И твердо жду смерти желанной!"
Так умер Шибанов, стремянный.
