= Aleksey Konstantinovich Tolstoy =

Russian poet, novelist, and playwright

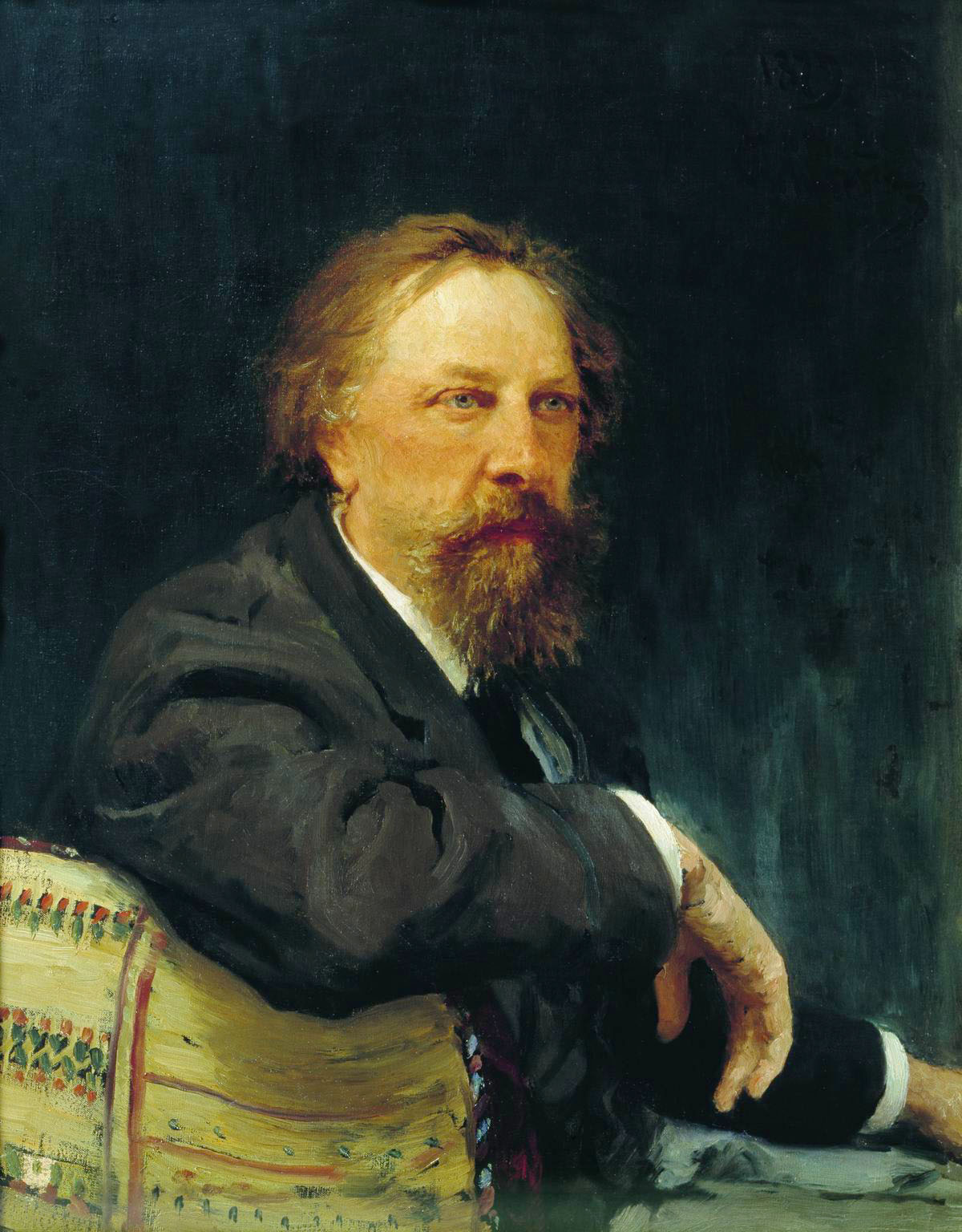
- Aleksey Konstantinovich Tolstoy by Ilya Repin
- Born: 5 September 1817; Saint Petersburg, Russian Empire
- Died: 10 October 1875 (aged 58); Krasny Rog, Chernigov Governorate, Russian Empire
- Writing career
- Genres: Poetry; fiction; drama
- Notable works: The Death of Ivan the Terrible; Tsar Fyodor Ioannovich; Tsar Boris; Prince Serebrenni

Count Aleksey Konstantinovich Tolstoy (Russian: Граф Алексей Константинович Толстой; 5 September [O.S. 24 August] 1817 – 10 October [O.S. 28 September] 1875), often referred to as A. K. Tolstoy, was a Russian poet, novelist, and playwright. He is considered to be the most important nineteenth-century Russian historical dramatist, primarily on account of the strength of his dramatic trilogy The Death of Ivan the Terrible (1866), Tsar Fyodor Ioannovich (1868), and Tsar Boris (1870). He also gained fame for his satirical works, published under his own name (History of the Russian State from Gostomysl to Timashev, The Dream of Councillor Popov) and under the collaborational pen name of Kozma Prutkov. His fictional works include the novella The Family of the Vourdalak, The Vampire (1841), and the historical novel Prince Serebrenni (1862).

Aleksey was a member of the Tolstoy family, and a second cousin of Leo Tolstoy. Due to his mother's closeness with the court of the Tsar, Aleksey was admitted to the future Alexander II's childhood entourage and became "a comrade in games" for the young Crown Prince. As a young man Tolstoy traveled widely, including trips to Italy and Germany, where he met Johann Wolfgang von Goethe. Tolstoy began his education at home under the tutelage of his uncle the writer Antony Pogorelsky, under whose influence he first became interested in writing poetry, and a number of other teachers. In 1834 Tolstoy enrolled in the Moscow Foreign Ministry State Archive as a student. In December 1835 he completed exams (in the English, French, and German languages as well as in literature, Latin, World and Russian history, and Russian statistics) at the University of Moscow.

Throughout the 1840s, Tolstoy led a busy high society life, full of pleasure trips, salon parties and balls, hunting sprees, and fleeting romances. He also spent many years in state service as a bureaucrat and diplomat. In 1856, on the day of his Coronation, Alexander II appointed Tolstoy one of his personal aide-de-adjutants. Tolstoy served as an infantry major in the Crimean War. He eventually left state service in the early 1860s to pursue his literary career. He died in 1875 of a self-administered lethal dose of morphine at his Krasny Rog estate in the Chernigov Governorate.

== Biography ==
=== Early life ===
Alexey Konstantinovich Tolstoy was born in Saint Petersburg to the famed family of Tolstoy. His father, Count Konstantin Petrovich Tolstoy (1780–1870), a son of the army general, was a Russian Assignation Bank councilor. His mother, Anna Alekseyevna Perovskaya (1796–1857), was an illegitimate daughter of Count Aleksey Kirillovich Razumovsky (1748–1822), an heir of the legendary Ukrainian hetman Alexey Razumovsky. A. K. Tolstoy's uncle (on his father's side) was Fyodor Tolstoy (1783–1873). His uncle on his mother's side was Aleksey Perovsky (1787–1836), an author known under the pen name of Antony Pogorelsky. Aleksey Konstantinovich was a second cousin of Leo Tolstoy; Count Pyotr Andreyevich Tolstoy was their common great-grandfather.

Konstantin Tolstoy and Anna Perovskaya's marriage was short-lived; they divorced in October 1817. With her six weeks old son, Anna moved first to her own Blistava estate in Chernigov Governorate, then to Krasny Rog (ru), an estate belonging to her brother Aleksey Perovsky, who became Aleksey Konstantinovich's tutor and a long-time companion. Common knowledge has it that Pogorelsky's famous fantasy fairytale The Black Chicken or The People of the Underground was premiered at home, his young nephew being the only member of Pogorelsky's audience. It was under the latter's influence that Aleksey started to write poetry, as early as 1823, inspired by some old books he found at home. Aleksey had good teachers and at the age of six he fluently spoke French, German and English. Later he learned Italian as well.

As for the Tolstoys, Anna Perovskaya stopped seeing them altogether, only sending them postcards on major dates and holidays. Remembering those happy years, Aleksey later wrote:

I was brought up by Aleksey Perovsky… I spent the first years of my life at his estate and that is why I regard Malorossia as my true homeland. My childhood, which was very happy, left me the most cloudless memories. My mother's only child, without any friends to play with but endowed with a lively imagination, from an early age I was a dreamer, a quality which soon transformed into distinct poetic inclinations. In many ways the local surroundings were conducive to that: the air itself, the huge forests I fell passionately in love with, all this impressed me so much as to completely form my present character.

In early 1826 Anna Perovskaya returned to Saint Petersburg with her brother and son. Here, due to his mother's closeness with the court of the Tsar, Aleksey was admitted to the future Tsar Alexander II's childhood entourage and in August became what was officially termed "a comrade in games" for the young Crown Prince. Aleksey's duties were not many: he had to visit the Crown Prince in Saint Petersburg and Tsarskoye Selo, take walks with him on Yelagin Island and participate in games, many of which were, in effect, small scale military exercises. They became friends and this friendship lasted for several decades, ending in the mid-1860s. In autumn of 1826 Aleksey met Aleksander Pushkin for the first time.

In summer 1827 the family visited Germany where in Weimar young Aleksey met Goethe. The great man greeted the boy very warmly and left him a fragment of a mammoth tusk with his own drawing (depicting a frigate) on it, for a present. Aleksey, having been awe-stricken, remembered little: "Only his magnificent features and the way he took me upon his lap," according to his autobiography. The family spent the next ten years in continuous travel, both in Russia and abroad. An 1831 trip to Italy especially impressed the 13-year-old. "Back in Russia I fell into a deep nostalgic depression, longing for Italy which felt like a real motherland; desperately mourning the loss, I cried at night when my dreams carried me off to this Paradise lost," he wrote in his autobiography decades later. In Italy the family met Karl Bryullov. On 10 May 1831, Aleksey wrote in his diary: "Bryullov dined with us and left a sketch in my album." The painter promised Perovsky to make portraits of all three of them once he was back in Russia, but five years later he had finished only one, that of his nephew.

=== Career ===
In 1834 Tolstoy enrolled in the Moscow Foreign Ministry State Archive as a "student", where he got his first taste of working with real historical documents. In December 1835 he completed exams (in English, French and German languages and literature, Latin, World and Russian history, and Russian statistics) at the University of Moscow for the formal 1st Grade State Bureaucrat certificate. He soon embarked on a career in the Economic Affairs and Statistics Department in Saint Petersburg. Before that, in July 1836, he had buried his uncle Aleksey Perovsky (who died in Warsaw of tuberculosis) and had become heir to his Krasny Rog estate. Also in 1835 Aleksey showed some of his new poems to Vasily Zhukovsky, who praised them. There's evidence that Pushkin also approved of the young poet's early works, giving him full moral support. Tolstoy wrote a lot, refining his technique, but wasn't eager to get published. "My first experiments were, no doubt, absurd, but at least metrically they were flawless. I went on training thus for many years, before I debuted... as a prose writer, not a poet," he remembered later.

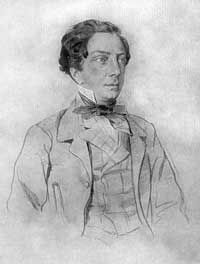
In the late 1830s Tolstoy developed a passion for hunting which he himself described as bizarre. "While serving at the Court of Tsar Nikolai I, and leading a most fashionable life which in a way appealed to me, I still used to run away (from the Palace) and spend weeks in the forests, occasionally with friends, but more often than not, alone. Submerging myself headlong into such a life, which corresponded as little with my artistic inclinations as it did with my official position in Court, I got quite a reputation among our best shooters as a bear-hunter! This hobby, I think, somehow affected my poetry which has always had a rather upbeat quality." – From his 1874 autobiography.

In January 1837 Tolstoy became attached to the Russian Embassy in Frankfurt where he spent the next two years. The assignment was rather formal; it did not demand Tolstoy's presence in Germany and he spent most of his time in Saint Petersburg, leading a merry life, spending up to three thousand rubles per month, often traveling to Italy and France. It was during one of these visits that he wrote his first two "gothic" novellas – The Family of the Vourdalak and Three Hundred Years On (originally in German, later translated into Russian by Boleslav Markevich). Tolstoy showed great interest in all things macabre, influenced, again, by his late uncle who "was obsessed with mysticism in every possible form" and who, in turn, was influenced by E. T. A. Hoffmann whom he was personally acquainted with.

In late 1840 Tolstoy was transferred back to Russia to a position in the Tsar's Imperial State Chancellery 2nd Department where he continued to work for many years, slowly rising in the hierarchy. As time went by, though, he showed less and less enthusiasm, for the demands of his position had come to feel like a major hindrance to his literary aspirations. In May 1841 Tolstoy debuted with The Vampire (a novella published under the pen name of "Krasnorogsky", a reference to Krasny Rog, his residence). Complicated in structure, multi-layered and rich in counterpoints, featuring both the element of "horror" and political satire, it instantly caught the attention of Vissarion Belinsky who praised its "obviously still very young, but undoubtedly gifted author," totally unaware of the latter's real identity. Tolstoy himself saw the story as insignificant and made no attempt to include it in any of the subsequent compilations; it was only in 1900 that The Vampire was re-issued. In the autumn of 1843 Tolstoy debuted as a poet: his poem "Serebryanka" was published in the No.40 edition of Listok Dlya Svetskikh Lyudey (The Paper for Fashionable People).

It took another two years for him to see his second short story, "Artyomy Semyonovich Bervenkovsky", a homage to the so-called 'natural school' apparently written under the influence of Nikolai Gogol's Dead Souls, published in the 1st volume of Count Vladimir Sollogub's Yesterday and Today almanac. The 2nd volume featured Amena, a novella, described as an extract from a novel called Stebelovsky which remained unfinished. Belinsky responded negatively to this publication, describing the piece as "rather dull", and an "unfortunate manifestation of mental irritation picked from Chateaubriand" (meaning apparently Les Martyrs, 1809).

Throughout the 1840s Tolstoy led a busy high society life, full of pleasure trips, salon parties and balls, hunting sprees and fleeting romances. He was described as "a handsome young man with blonde hair and a freshly coloured face" and was renowned for his physical strength, "bending spoons, forks and horse-shoes and driving nails into walls with one finger." One notable business trip to Kaluga in 1850 led to a close friendship with Nikolai Gogol (whom he first met in Frankfurt and then in Rome). Tolstoy recited to Gogol many of his yet unpublished poems and fragments from what later became the novel Prince Serebryany. Gogol read him the second part of his novel Dead Souls. Among other friendships he struck up in the forties were those with Ivan Aksakov, Pavel Annenkov, Nikolai Nekrasov, Ivan Panaev and Ivan Turgenev.

In the early 1850s, in collaboration with the Zhemchuzhnikov brothers, Tolstoy created the fictional writer Kozma Prutkov, a petty bureaucrat with great self-esteem who parodied the poetry of the day and soon became famous for his utterly banal aphorisms. In 1851 Prutkov debuted with The Fantasy a comedy which was signed "Y" and "Z" and written by Tolstoy and Aleksey Zhemchuzhnikov. The play, mocking the then popular "nonsense" vaudeville premiered on 8 January in the Alexandrinsky Theatre. This spectacular farce (featuring at one point a dozen small dogs running about on stage) caused a huge scandal, was promptly banned by Nikolay I (who was among the audience) and remained unpublished until 1884.

It was also in 1851 that Tolstoy first met Sophia Andreyevna Miller (1827?–1892), the wife of a cavalry colonel (whom she later divorced with great difficulty) and an impressively well-educated woman who knew fourteen languages, at a Bolshoy Theater masquerade. Tolstoy fell in love with her but had to wait for another twelve years before they were able to marry. Miller had, apparently, a perfect artistic taste and Tolstoy later referred to her as his harshest and most objective critic, as well as the best friend he'd ever had. All of his love lyrics from 1851 onwards were written for and about Sophia. Many of his poems ("My dear bluebells", "Amidst the ball uproar", "Brighter than the skylark's singing", "The wind from high up, it is not...") have been set to music by renowned composers and have become famous Russian romances.

In 1854 Sovremennik magazine published several of Tolstoy's verses ("My bluebells", "Oh you haystacks..." and others), which instantly got critics talking, and also the first of Kozma Prutkov's humorously pompous poetic exercises. The latter was not so much a collective pseudonym, as a character who was making quite a point of coming across as a "real" creature, performing, among other things, obnoxious pranks, one of which involved a messenger visiting all the leading Saint Petersburg architects late at night with the urgent news of the Isaakiyevsky Cathedral having fallen down and urging them to appear early next morning at the court of Tsar Nikolay I, which they hastily did, to the Tsar's utter annoyance.

As the Crimean War broke out, Tolstoy's first intention was to gather a partisan fighting unit and lead it to the Baltic Sea, should the English decide to land there. Along with Count Aleksey Bobrinsky (future Minister of transport) he started to finance and equip two partisan squads, forty fighters each. He bought some ammunition from Tula and traveled all along the Baltic coastline, examining what was supposed to be his future theater of war, the Crown Prince being totally unaware of his plans. On 2 September the allies landed at Yevpatoria and Tolstoy headed South, to join the Imperial infantry regiment (under the command of Lev Perovsky, another of his uncles) as an army major, in March 1855. The regiment went only as far as Odessa where a thousand men were lost from typhoid. In February 1856 Tolstoy became one of the casualties. In Odessa he was nursed back to health by Sophia Miller. Alexander II was telegraphed daily on the subject of his old friend's condition, at his personal request. In May 1855 Tolstoy was back on his feet, but the war was over for him; he instead embarked upon a Crimean journey with Sophia.

After the War, in 1856, on the day of his Coronation, Alexander II appointed Tolstoy as one of his personal aide-de-camp. It was only three years later that Tolstoy managed to get rid of this tiresome privilege which implied regular duties in the Palace, interfering with his now burgeoning literary career. "You cannot imagine what a storm of rhymes rages in me, what waves of poetry are sweeping through me, longing to break free," he wrote in a letter to Sophia Miller. Two thirds of Tolstoy's poetic legacy was created in the late 1850s. 1857 saw the publication of a large poem called The Sinner. It was followed by the more significant Ioann Damaskin, first published in Russkaya Beseda January 1859 issue. The poem, dealing with the nature of poetry and the poet's position in society, but also hinting at the author's personal plight, caused scandal. The head of the 3rd Department Prince Vasily Dolgorukov ordered the printing of the magazine to be stopped and for the poem to be removed. The Minister of Education Evgraf Kovalevsky personally permitted the publication, his rather daring decision causing a serious rift between the two departments.

Tolstoy's poems were appearing in virtually all the major Russian magazines of the time, regardless of their ideological inclinations. Yet, in 1857 his relationship with the leftist Sovremennik group became strained. Tolstoy drifted towards the Slavophiles and their Russkaya Beseda magazine, becoming a close friend of Ivan Aksakov and Aleksey Khomyakov, but this liaison was short-lived too. In the 1860s he found himself in a strange position of being a highly popular author, criticized fiercely both from the left and from the right. As to the reasons for this, A. K. Tolstoy was never in doubt. In an autobiographical letter to Angelo de Gubernatis he wrote:

On the one hand I loathe the repressive hand of power, on the other, pseudo-liberalism having for its aim not the raising up of the low, but the tearing down of high things. These two aversions easily fall into one general hatred of despotism, whatever form it takes. And there is another thing I am averse to: the didactic platitudes of our so-called progressives who preach utilitarianism in poetry. I am one of only two or three authors here who carry the banner of the principle of Art for art's sake. For I am totally convinced that a poet's mission is not presenting the common people with some kind of illusory favours or profits, but trying to raise their morality level; to imbue into them the love for beauty; the love that is the means in itself which will always find its end without any propaganda being involved. This point of view directly clashes with the one that is dominant in our journals. So, giving me great honour by regarding me as the major representative of the ideas they oppose, these people keep scolding me with a fervor worthy of a better cause. Our press is mostly in the hands of socialist theoreticians. Of this vast clique which is busy serving its own slogans and keeping its own proscription lists, I am the target. And all the while the reading public gives me nothing but their approval. And one more curious detail: while the journals label me "retrograde", the authorities consider me "a revolutionary."

Tolstoy caused much controversy with his scathing remarks aimed at contemporary government officials (Alexander Timashev, Vladimir Butkov, Ivan Veillot) whom he – a supporter of the monarch – considered real enemies of the State. He also criticized the activities of the 3rd Department, and in the wake of the Polish uprising was one of the very few people in the Court to openly denounce Muravyov the Hangman's draconian methods of political repression.

A fierce opponent of xenophobia, he saw Russia as a European country, and Russians as Europeans. This clashed with the Slavophile doctrine of maintaining Russia's "special place" in the world. "[Speaking] of slavophiles, Khomyakov sickens me when he places [Russia] above the West just on the strength of our being Orthodox," Tolstoy wrote in a letter. All the while, well-publicized was his dispute with Turgenev, who saw the French state as Russia's potential guiding light. "What France is moving towards is the dictatorship of mediocrity," Tolstoy argued. Being neither a westernizer nor a slavophile, Tolstoy annoyed both parties by his infatuation with pre-Tatar Russian society which he idealized whole-heartedly, seeing it as an Eastern strain of European knighthood, based on the cult of the nobleman. Also causing controversy were Tolstoy's critique of the West's amoral pragmatism and socialist ideas, his dismissal of the Russian imperial ideals which he saw as tragically flawed, and his own doctrine of a centralized Russia, the vile Moscovia State being, in his view, at the root of all Russian political evil. This eclectic "political romanticism" appeared to be in conflict with every political and social trend of the time.

Tolstoy rejected some ecclesiastical teachings, calling them the "church's argo" and believed in God as a "higher being" and cosmic mind. "I believe God gave us the power of emotion so we could go further than our mind leads us. As a leading force, human emotion is preferable to a thought, just as music is more perfect than a spoken word," he wrote.

==== 1861–1875 ====
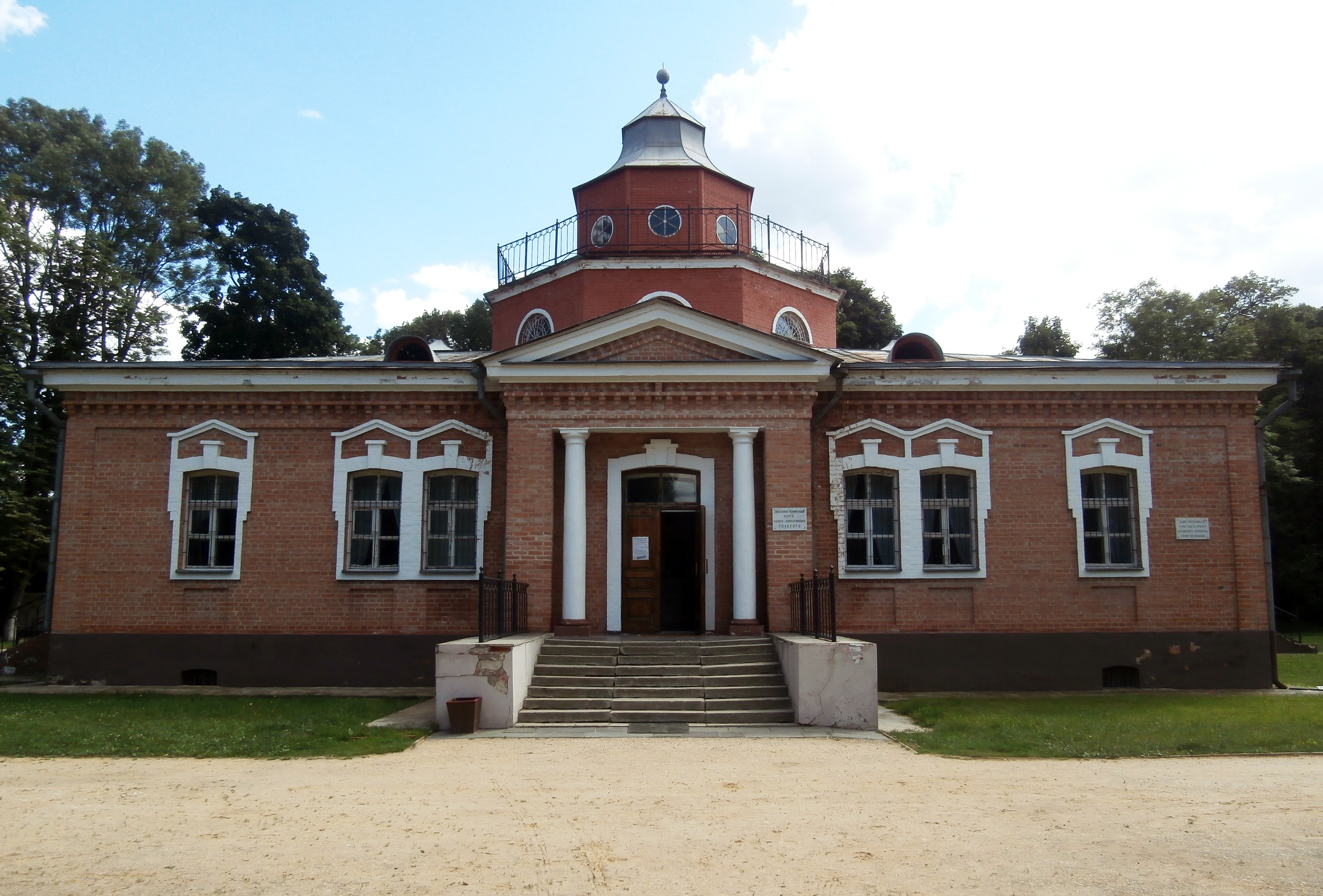
House of Aleksey Konstantinovich Tolstoy at Krasny Rog

In 1861 Tolstoy quit the Court. "For quite some time I was under the illusion that I'd be able to suppress my artistic nature but life taught me different; this struggle was futile. Service and the arts are incompatible," he wrote in a letter to the disappointed Alexander II. "Tolstoy represented a rare type of man who not only evaded by every possible means the favours and laurels that came his way, but had to go through painfully tedious battles with people who, driven by the best of intentions, were imposing every opportunity of making a brilliant career on him," wrote literary historian and BEED biographer Semyon Vengerov in 1903.

From then on the writer's visits to the Palace became rare, but he used each one as an opportunity to "speak the truth regardless," as he put it. In 1862 Tolstoy solicited for Ivan Aksakov who'd been banned from editing his Den (The Day) newspaper. A year later he helped Ivan Turgenev out of an exile the latter found himself in after having contacted the "London propagandists", as Alexander Herzen and Nikolay Ogarev were then known. In 1864 Tolstoy tried to exert his influence upon Alexander II to make him alleviate the plight of the imprisoned Chernyshevsky. Asked by the Tsar for the latest news in the world of literature, Tolstoy said: "The whole of Russia has gone into mourning for Chernyshevsky to whom an injustice has been done..." - "No, Tolstoy, I beg you never to remind me of Chernyshevsky, please," the monarch hastily retorted. This aborted conversation, as it happened, brought to an end a friendship that had lasted for forty years.

Tolstoy's historical novel Prince Serebrenni (1862, Russky Vestnik), set during the time of Ivan the Terrible, was widely popular and was translated into many languages. The novel premiered at a recital evening in the Palace, and brought its author a book-trinket from the Empress consort Maria Aleksandrovna, who greatly admired Tolstoy, both as writer and a person. His poetic drama Don Juan, published the same year, was less successful: even if not officially banned, it wasn't staged in its author's lifetime and made its theatrical debut only in 1905, severely cut by censors.

Kozma Prutkov aside, Tolstoy wrote satirical verses under his own name, the best known of which was the Karamzin-inspired History of the Russian State from Gostomysl to Timashev (1868), a parody on Russian history that focused on the vicious characteristics of Russian monarchs. Another satirical poem, The Dream of Councillor Popov, written in the summer of 1873, spread across Russia in hand-written form and became hugely popular. Both Leo Tolstoy and Ivan Turgenev expressed their delight at this personal swipe at the Interior Minister Pyotr Valuyev, and a mockery in general of a conservative bureaucrat trying to come across as a liberal. The poem came out in 1878, in Berlin, as a brochure, then six years later was reprinted by Russkaya Starina (No.12, 1884). 1867 saw the release of Poems, the vast collection of Tolstoy's verse (all in all, 131 pieces), the only such compilation published in his lifetime.

Tolstoy's lasting contribution to Russian literature was a trilogy of historical dramas (modelled after Alexander Pushkin's Boris Godunov): The Death of Ivan the Terrible, Tsar Fyodor Ioannovich, and Tsar Boris. The Death of Ivan the Terrible, published in 1866 in Otechestvennye Zapiski magazine, was staged the following year in Saint Petersburg, Moscow, and some provincial theaters and enjoyed massive success, but after 1870 was virtually banned and got revived on stage only in the late 1890s. Tsar Fyodor Ioannovich (1868, Vestnik Evropy) was banned from being produced on stage personally by Interior minister Timashev; as late as 1907 censors deemed the play "inappropriate." Tsar Boris (1870, Vestnik Evropy) received no official ban, but the Directorial council of the Imperial Theatres refused to sanction its production. In 1871 Tolstoy started his fifth and final play called Posadnik (set in the times when the Novgorod Republic prospered), which remained unfinished. Parts of it were published in Skladchina, an 1874 charity almanac, the rest appeared in Vestnik Evropy in 1876, after the author's death.

=== Later life ===
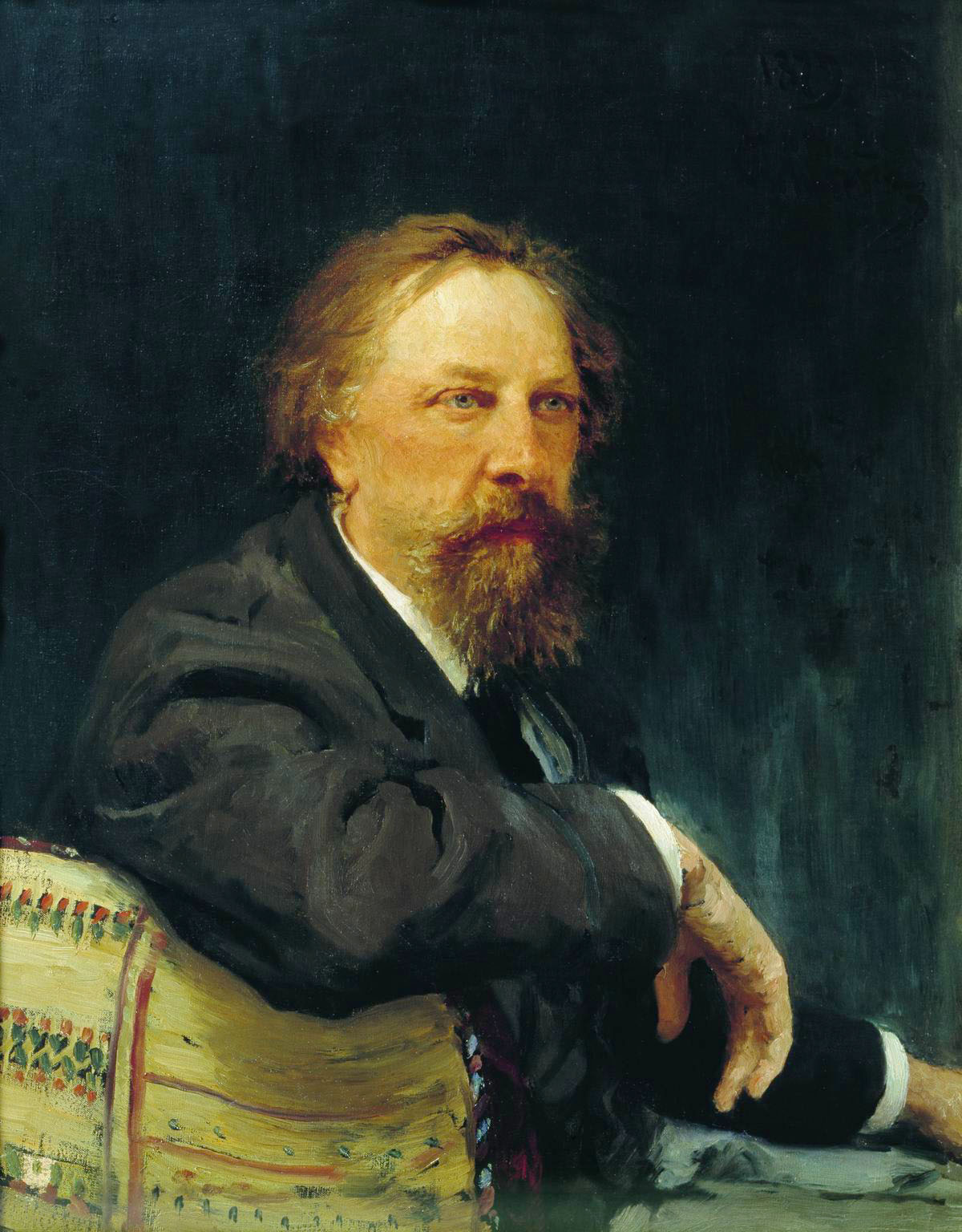
Tolstoy in his later years. Portrait by Ilya Repin, 1896.

Tolstoy was a lenient land-owner, admired by his Krasny Rog peasants who were permitted to use his fields as common pastures and given free timber and primary education for their children in a school he built for them in 1859. In 1861 he personally gathered all of his peasants together, read them the Emancipation reform of 1861 decree, gave money to everybody present and participated in the grandiose drinking spree that followed. Being a lavish spender and having no knowledge of the practical side of life, by the end of the 1860s he found himself on the verge of bankruptcy, but loathed the idea of returning to the Tsar's Court.

Ever since the mid-1860s Tolstoy had fallen more and more out of sync with Russian cultural life, feeling acutely his ideological and spiritual isolation. Referring to himself as an 'anchorite', he spent most of his time in Pustynka (near Saint Petersburg) and his Krasny Rog estate, worsening financial situation and deteriorating health adding to his troubles. Tired of fighting his many opponents, totally disillusioned with what he saw around him, A. K. Tolstoy wrote to his friend Boleslav Markevich in 1869:

I've come to the conclusion that we do not deserve a Constitution. No matter how barbaric our rulers are, they are still better than the ones they rule. The Russian nation doesn't amount to much at all nowadays... Yet we, who should be deeply ashamed of ourselves, try and show our back to Europe instead; proclaim some "new beginnings" and dare speak of "the rotting West"!... Should God decide to give me another birth today and ask me which nationality I'd like to be born into, I'd tell him: "Your Majesty! Stick me into wherever you want, but not Russia again." When I think of the beauty of our language and of how gorgeous our history was before the accursed Mongols came, I want to fall to the ground and writhe in desperation, mad at what we've done with all the talent that God has given us.

A. K. Tolstoy entered the 1870s as a very sick man, suffering from asthma, angina pectoris, neuralgias and severe headaches. Regular visits to European medics only temporarily alleviated his conditions. In the spring of 1875 Tolstoy started taking morphine. "Now I'm feeling much better, at least the neuralgia's gone. But never before have I been so short of breath. Asthma fits are continuous," he complained in a letter to poet Karolina Pavlova (who was also a translator of his dramas) on 8 July 1875.

Aleksey Konstantinovich Tolstoy died on 28 September 1875, in Krasny Rog, Chernigov Governorate, after having given himself a lethal injection of morphine. He was buried in the family vault in the Uspenskaya Church in Krasny Rog.

== Legacy ==
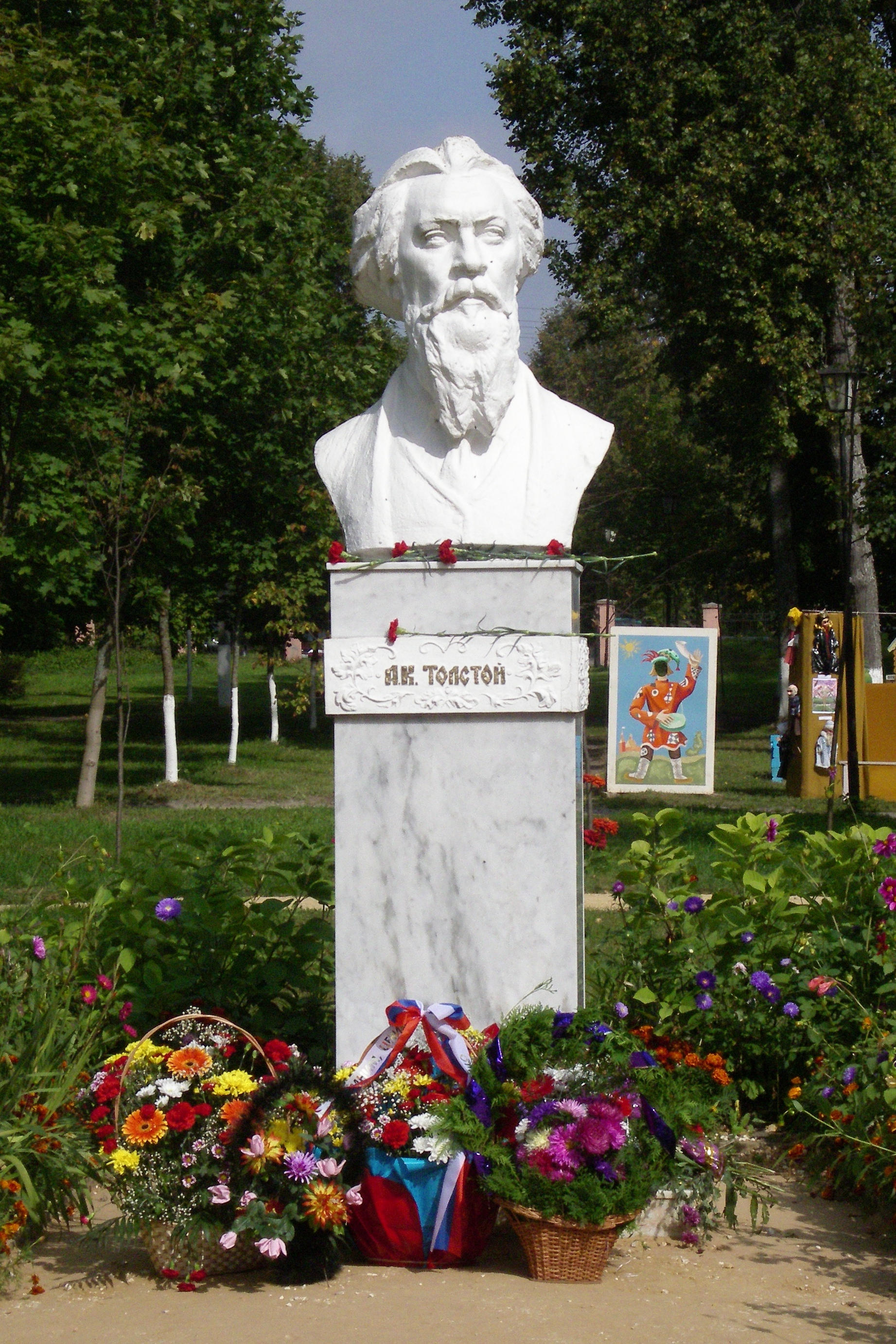
The monument to A. K. Tolstoy at the Krasny Rog estate

Tolstoy represented the later period of Romanticism in Russian literature; art for him was a mystic link between the human world and the higher spheres where "eternal ideas dwell." Along with Afanasy Fet, his artistic and spiritual ally, he saw Art as a higher science, man's only instrument for a true and comprehensive understanding of the world. Romantic tendencies were best realised in Tolstoy's poetry and in some of his dramas, notably Don Juan where the hero is on quest for a romantic ideal, looking everywhere for love "that helps one penetrate into the wonderful universal laws, our world's hidden beginnings," as he put it. "Art can only be a 'means' – all of the 'ends'... it contains in itself," Tolstoy wrote in 1870, in the course of long dispute with those whom he labeled "utilitarianists in literature". Such views automatically made him a "conservative" in the eyes of the revolutionary democrats who formed a large majority in the Russian literary circles of the 1850s and 1860s. Unlike Fet, though, Tolstoy insisted on the artist's total independence from ideology and politics, and felt himself totally free to criticize and mock authorities, a trait that snubbed many people in high places.

Tolstoy's poetry had certain qualities that made it unusual and even unique, one being the "half-spoken" nature of the verse. "It's good for poetry when a thought is only half-fulfilled, so that readers can complete it – each in their own way," he explained in a letter to Sophia Miller in 1854. This view translated into a technique of writing. One of the things Tolstoy was criticized and even jeered for were "bad rhymes" which he used consciously, as part of his "poetic system". "Imperfect rhyming, if kept in bounds of course, can be seen as corresponding to the Venetian school in painting which with little imperfections, or should I say, carelessnesses, could achieve the kind of effects which Raphael wouldn't dream of for all of his precision," Tolstoy wrote in 1859. In fact, Tolstoy, as I. Yampolsky pointed out, was a master of versification. Consciously imposed "careless" rhyming gave his poems an improvisational tone (with "an impression of thoughts being put to paper exactly in the form they were born") but behind it there was hard work and much editing. "Tolstoy's verse is so simple it hardly rises above prose, yet the poetic impression it carries is perfectly full," critic Nikolay Strakhov wrote in 1867. Another unusual feature of Tolstoy's poems was the fact that, while rather salon-like and graceful both in nature and form, they were full of 'simplistic' bits borrowed freely from common talk and traditional Russian folklore. Kept in perfect balance, these tinged his verse with a peculiar, musical quality. More than half of Tolstoy's poems have been put to music by leading Russian composers like Tchaykovsky, Rimsky-Korsakov, Musorgsky, Mily Balakirev, Cesar Cui, Anton Rubinstein, Sergey Rakhmaninov and others. "Tolstoy is the unfathomable well of poems crying for music. For me he is one of the most attractive poets," wrote Tchaykovsky.

Assessing Tolstoy's poetry as a whole, D. S. Mirsky wrote:

Tolstoy, like Maykov and Polonsky, was an eclectic, but his eclecticism was not the result of a compromise between inner impulse and outward influence (that of "new trends"), it came rather from inner poise and harmony. He represented the "golden middle", mediocritas in the best, classical sense of the word. Multifacetedness and an all-embracing placid clarity based on Plato's idealism are the basic features of Tolstoy's poetry. He is the least tragic, least disharmonious of the Russian poets, but his harmony has nothing to do with complacency or self-righteousness. It is clean and noble. In poetry, as in life, Tolstoy is a gentleman from head to toe.

"Even if they suffer from sentimentality and are occasionally banal, his lyrics retain their freshness and even now taste like a delightful morning dew," the critic wrote.

Innokenty Annensky saw Tolstoy's poetry as being the perfect expression of "pure love", the "human soul's inner beauty" being the poet's ideal. "Tolstoy never wrote for children but his crystal clear idealism, tinged with mysticism, made his poetry resonate well with the period in adolescence when the human soul reaches out to something high and indescribable," Annensky wrote. Mentioning Nekrasov, who in his latter works created a strong image of the Russian mother, Annensky argued that what Tolstoy managed to create was an equally sublime portrait of the noble woman whose "serene placidity belies unspeakable sadness… of the one who's ashamed of her own happiness fearing that she, making the most of this world's beauty, somehow takes it away from those who have no opportunity to enjoy such riches in abundance."

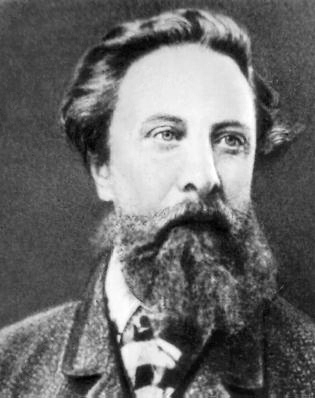
"His idea that 'violence and suppression of free thought were contrary to God's will' was not just a pretty phrase but an innermost conviction. For he was indeed a noble man". – Yuly Aykhenvald.

Tolstoy's ballads and songs were close to traditional bylinas both in essence and form; in fact, the author himself made no distinction between the two genres. Critics argued that (unlike, say, Nekrasov) Tolstoy used folklorisms as a mere stylistic instrument, using stories from the history of the Russian Middle Ages as a means to convey his own ideas and theories (Zmei Tugarin), and to link historical utopias with relevant social comment (Boryvoi, Vasily Shibanov). Tolstoy tended to greatly idealise Russia's pre-Mongol past which made the traditional bylina characters almost superheroes. "It's hard to recognize Alyosha Popovich, eyes-a-jealous, hands-a-grabbin'- as a romantic youth, speaking of love and devotion to his beloved," Semyon Vengerov remarked. Likewise, the fearsome Ilya Muromets who came across as a rather violent, dangerous and often sacrilegious type in folk bylinas, was portrayed by Tolstoy as a "benign grandfather figure," rather gracious and well-spoken.

Critic Yuly Aykhenvald derided Tolstoy's insistence on continuing with his "nationalistic masquerade" and quoted Anton Chekhov as commenting: "[Tolstoy] has put the opera costume on and forgotten to take it off before leaving the theatre." According to Aykhenvald, Tolstoy failed to see that "the national values, when taken to the extreme, become alien-looking." For Aykhenvald, though, it was Tolstoy's humour that prevented him from turning into an "archeology worshipper". The critic saw Tolstoy's romanticism as universal and in a certain way religious (resulting in the fact that his most memorable character, Tsar Fyodor was "an epitome of Christian meekness and grace"). Yet, "[Tolstoy] worshipped that kind of God who was devoid of stiffness... he was a free spirit and valued freedom most."

Tolstoy's sense of humour was best realised in Kozma Prutkov's extraordinary aphorisms, as well as in his own satirical poems. "Tolstoy... without any doubt, is Russia's greatest absurdist poet," wrote Mirsky. The Dream of Councillor Popov and History of the Russian State from Gostomysl to Timashev, his best known satires, were spread across Russia in manuscript, gaining huge popularity amongst all social strata. According to Mirsky, The Dream is "the acme of Russian humorous poetry, mixing sharp, poignant satire... and pure delight in cheerful absurdity". It's The Dream that can be seen as Aleksey Tolstoy's most solid claim for immortality," the critic argued, mentioning The Uproar in the Vatican as another of his humorous masterpieces.

Tolstoy's anti-leftist, pro-conservative sarcasm, on the other hand, received much stick from the 'democratic' press. His "Ballad With a Tendency" was bitterly criticised by Saltykov-Schedrin while Iskra magazine parodied it in 1872 with a verse entitled "A Ballad with a Pro-Police Tendency". Shchedrin, describing the current state of Russian literature as a "kingdom of scoundrels", in a letter to Aleksey Zhemchuzhnikov wrote: "Add to all this the fun-and-games-seeking 'free artists' like Count A. K. Tolstoy who makes... our obscurantists' hearts beat faster with delight. I don't know about you, but I find it painful to see how people whom I though honest, even if not very far-seeing, fight on the side of obscurantism, employing pseudo-folklorism as a weapon."

Tolstoy was a master of prose; both his novella The Vampire (praised by Vissarion Belinsky) and his novel Prince Serebrenni received a lot of good press. The latter, though, was criticised for being tendentious; many argued that both the main character and Yelena Morozova looked very much like people of the 19th, rather than 16th century. On the other hand, Ivan Grozny and the oprichnina horrors were depicted with great vividness and passion; the novel's masterfully built structure, its rich musical language made it a perfect Walter Scott-type of book for adolescents, according to Vengerov. "The novel is highly involving… finely structured and well-written," Ivan Turgenev wrote, recommending it to a French publisher. Still, as a prosaic Tolstoy made much less of an impact than as a poet. He's been lauded as a classic of the 19th century Russian historical drama. D. S. Mirsky regarded Tolstoy as a dramatist superior to Aleksander Ostrovsky, describing his plays as "full of intriguing ideas and brilliantly crafted characters. They impress us with intelligence and insight rather than with flights of imagination, but in Tsar Fyodor Tolstoy managed to create one of the most interesting characters in Russian literature: that of a kind and weak ruler who has a keen sense of justice but is unable to make his evil aids implement his good will."

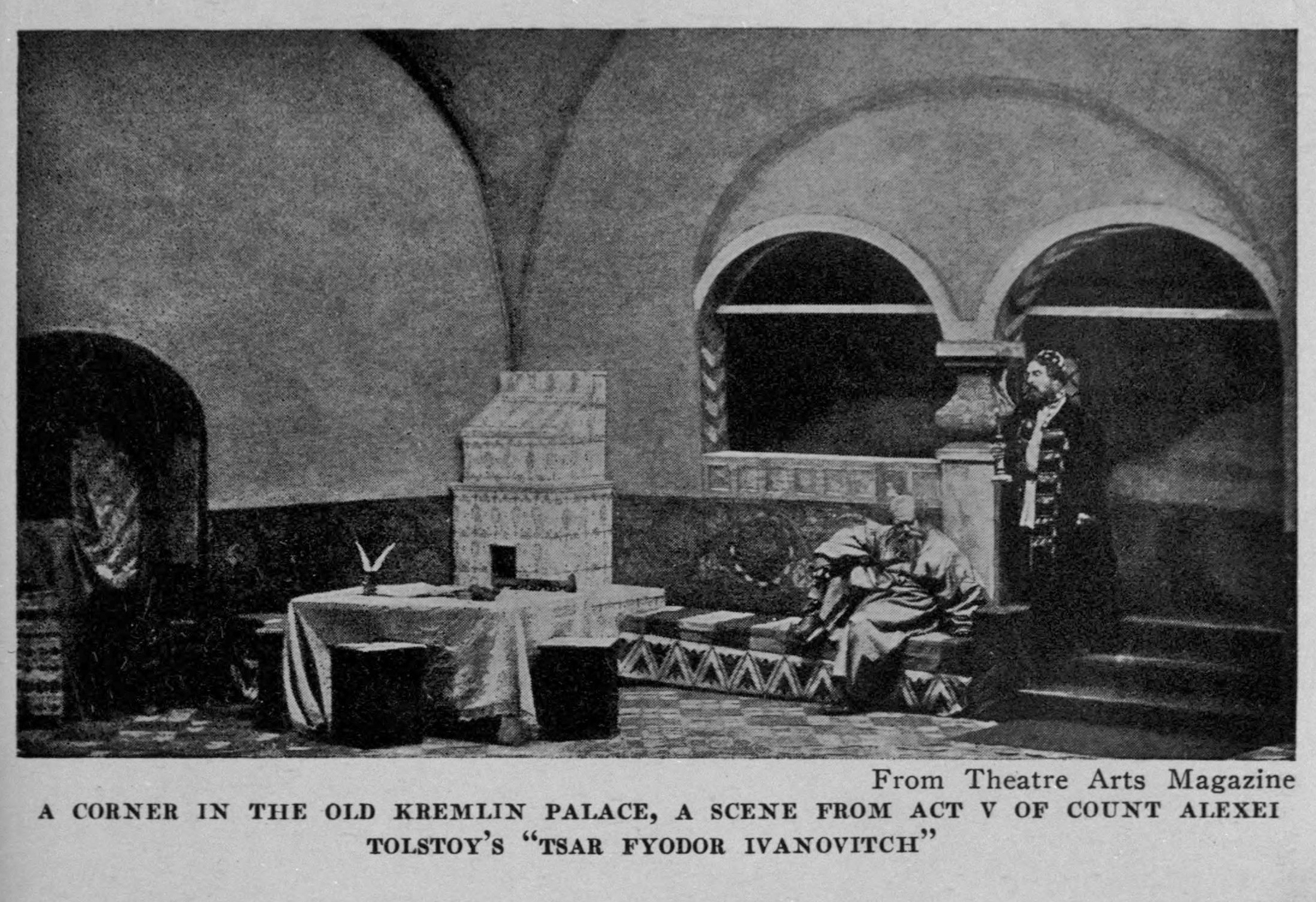
A scene from Act V of Tsar Fyodor Ioannovich

Critics noted, though, that history as such was secondary to Tolstoy; he was driven mostly by his own personal views and feelings, tending to judge his 16th-century characters using mid-19th-century moral values. "The life of today seeps through everywhere," Tolstoy himself admitted, speaking of his ballads. According to the author, historical drama had to be "true" only in a "humanist way". "A poet... has just one responsibility: to his own poetic self... human truth is his one law. Historical truth is something he is not bound to. If it fits into the concept, very good, if not, he can easily do without it," he wrote. So on the one hand, Tolstoy's dramatic trilogy- The Death of Ivan the Terrible, Tsar Fyodor Ioannovich and Tsar Boris- was not historical in the strict sense of the word; on the other hand, it was far from being the brand of "patriotic drama" produced by Nestor Kukolnik or the imitation of the French tragedie des allusions which Aleksander Pushkin ridiculed. In fact, Pushkin's attitude was the closest approximation to that of Tolstoy. The latter's plays had their "second levels", directly corresponding to contemporary political situations, but were driven mostly by the author's historical views and theories which involved the glorifying of Russian "noble men" (he associated them with the boyarstvo) and the vilification Ivan Grozny whom the boyarstvo had fallen victim to.

Pavel Annenkov considered Ioann and Fyodor as "loosely based upon" characters, being perfectly fine but only in representing their era, not their own historical selves. "They are as loose as King Lear or Hamlet were and, if they do belong more to Russian history than those two belong to English history, that is because no other reality than that of our Old Russia could have inspired [Tolstoy] in such a way, bringing him such colors, such an essence to freely draw from," the critic wrote. It was the generic closeness of Tolstoy's plays to the Russia of old, Annenkov argued, that made them historic in the truest sense of the word, for "their significance as living testimony to the spirit those people and their times is beyond doubt".

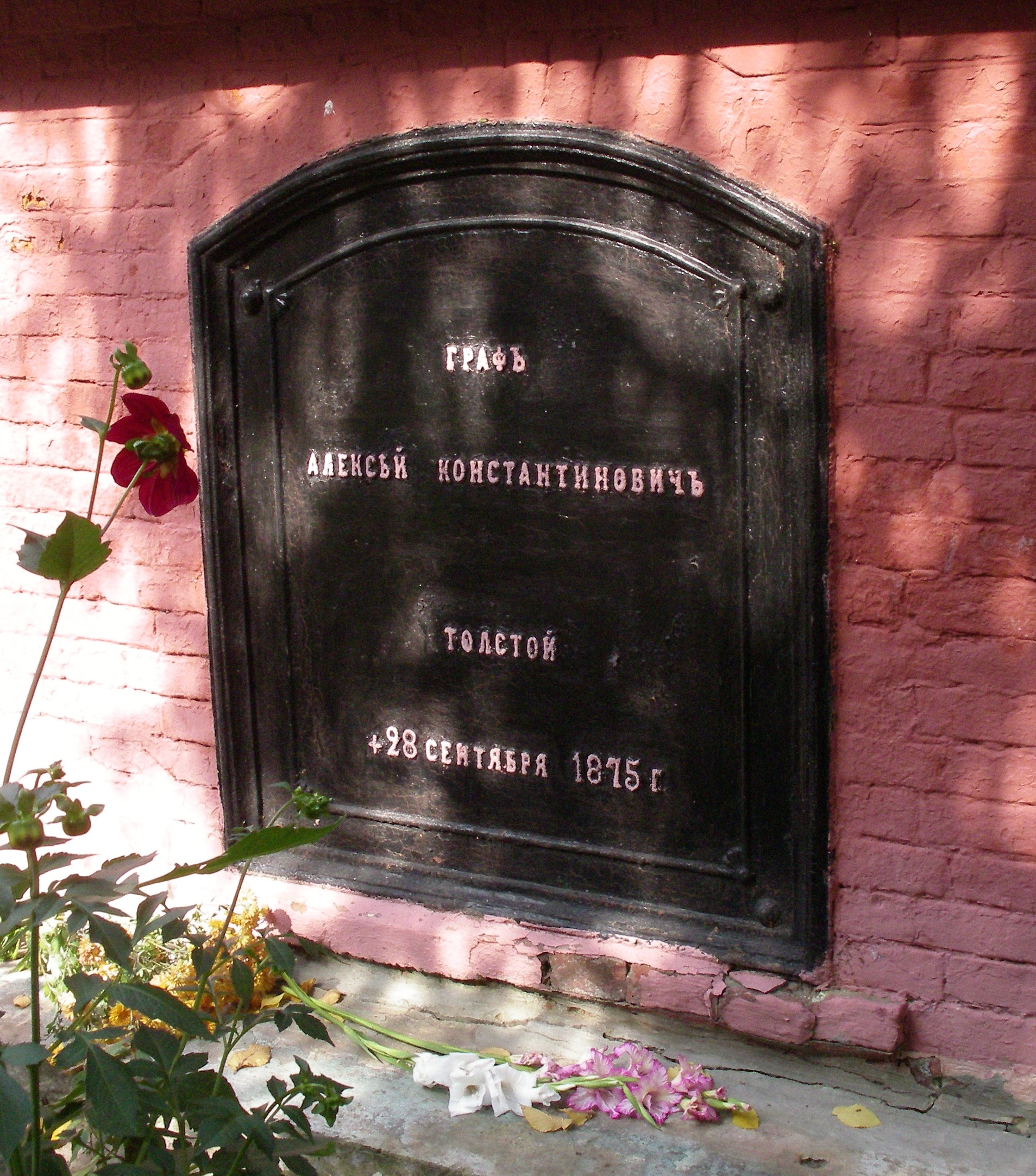
A. K. Tolstoy's grave in Krasny Rog

Common to the trilogy was a somewhat morbid look at the history of the Russian monarchy of the previous three centuries, where, as the author saw it, all the efficient rulers happened to be evil, and all the 'good' ones proved to be inefficient. The three stories of three different historical figures had similarly didactic finales: "God help you, Tsar Ivan, and God forgive us all! That's the fate autocracy deserved! Here's the result of our disintegration!" (Zakharyin's words over Ivan the Terrible's dead body), "I am to blame for all of this... Oh God, why did you make me Tsar?!" (Tsar Fyodor), "What Evil spawns is only more evil and nothing else." (Boris Godunov). All three parts of the trilogy, which, according to Nestor Kotlyarevsky, were "united by the idea of tragedy being intrinsic to Tsarist power in Russia," had serious problems with the censorship. The trilogy continued to divide opinion in Russia up until 1917. Not long before the Revolution, in Alexandrinsky Theatre the public reacted to Tsar Boris in an overtly political fashion. Monarchists applauded Boris Godunov's words, the left "supported" boyarin Sitsky, seeing in him a fighter of despotism. All three plays became part of the repertoire of the leading Russian and Soviet theaters, notably the Maly Theatre, with stars like Ivan Moskvin, Pavel Olenev, Stepan Kuznetsov and Nikolai Khmelyov in the leading roles. According to I. Yampolsky, Tolstoy the dramatist, even if not on par with Pushkin, was high above his contemporaries; he created complex, multi-dimensional historical figures. "In the arts, to be wary of showing weaknesses in your favourite characters is to pay them bad service... Thus one can only succeed in creating faceless dummies whom nobody would believe in," Tolstoy wrote.

In the mid-19th century Tolstoy was not taken very seriously, but his reputation started to grow after his death in 1875. Vladimir Korolenko called Tsar Fyodor Ioannovich "a gem of Russian drama," that's been shining especially bright next to "the totally dismal theater repertoire of the late 19th century".

Tolstoy was highly valued by Aleksander Blok and Valery Bryusov; Ivan Bunin, otherwise harsh in his comments on fellow writers, rated him very high; Velemir Khlebnikov mentioned him among his all-time favourites and, most surprisingly (according to Korney Chukovsky), Vladimir Mayakovsky knew his poetry by heart and often recited it in public. Both Tolstoy's poetry (the larger part of which has been transformed into classic romance) and his historical drama trilogy are regarded as an intrinsic part of the classic Russian literature of the 19th century.

== Selected works ==
=== Drama ===
- Don Juan (Дон Жуан, 1862)
- The Death of Ivan the Terrible (Смерть Иоанна Грозного, 1866)
- Tsar Fyodor Ioannovich (Царь Фёдор Иоаннович, 1868)
- Tsar Boris (Царь Борис, 1870)
- Posadnik (Посадник, 1871, published in 1874–1976)

=== Prose ===
- "The Family of the Vourdalak" (Семья вурдалака, written 1839 in French, first published 1884)
- The Vampire (Упырь, 1841)
- Prince Serebrenni (known also as The Silver Knight, Князь Серебряный, 1862)

=== Poetry ===
- The Sinner (Грешница, 1857)
- Ioann Damaskin (Иоанн Дамаскин, 1858)
- Vasily Shibanov (Василий Шибанов, 1858)
- The Alchemist (unfinished, 1867)
- History of the Russian State from Gostomysl to Timashev (1868)
- Portrait (Портрет, 1872)
- Dragon (1875)
- The Dream of Councillor Popov (written 1873, first published in 1978, Berlin)
