= Boleslav Markevich =

Russian-Polish writer

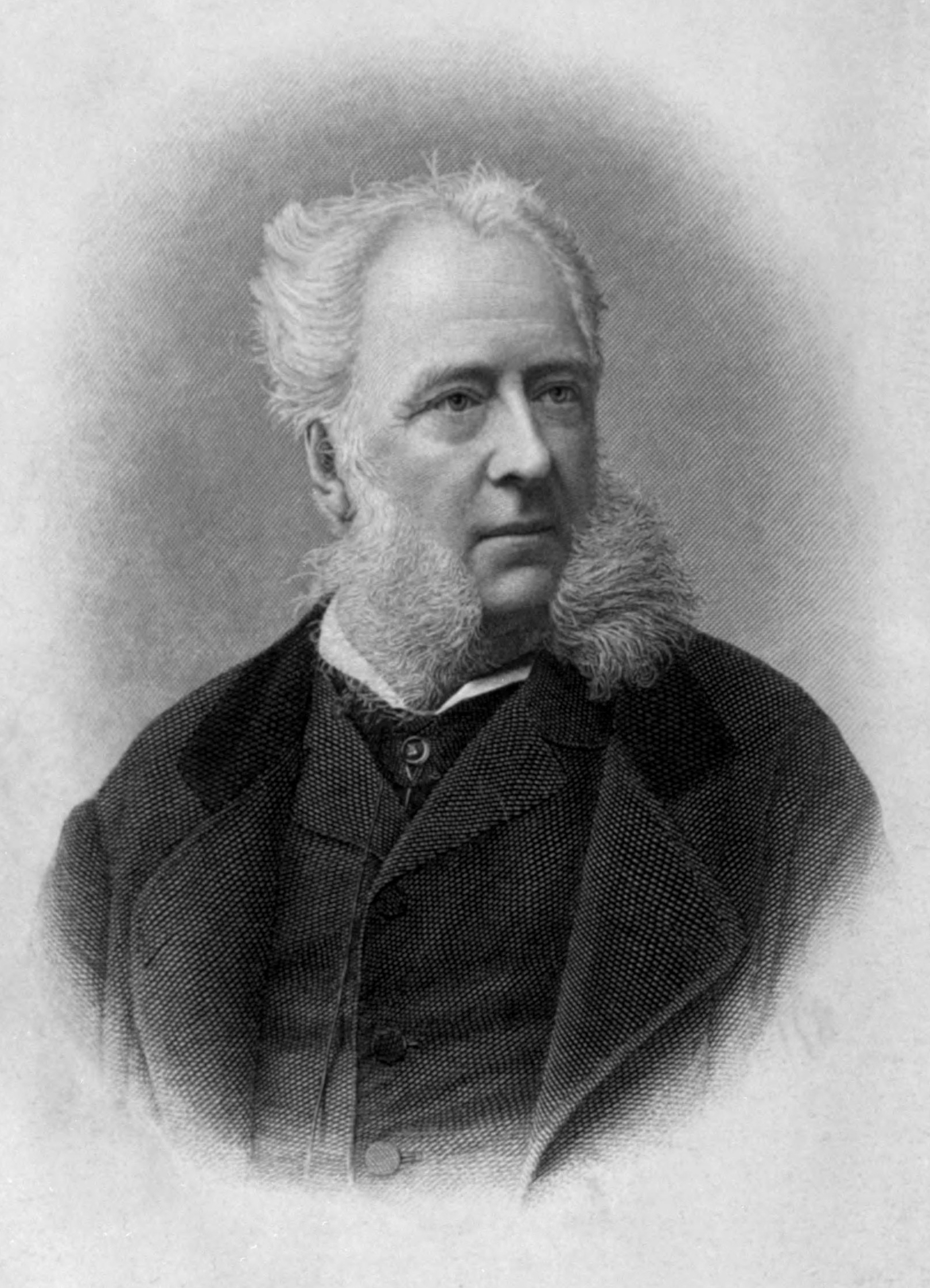
- Born: 1822 Saint Petersburg, Russian Empire
- Died: 30 November 1884 (aged 61–62) Saint Petersburg, Russian Empire

Boleslav Mikhailovich Markevich (Russian: Болеслав Михайлович Маркевич; 1822 – 18 (30) November 1884) was a Russian writer, essayist, journalist, and literary critic of Polish origin; author of a number of popular novels, including: Marina of the Aluy Rog (1873), A Quarter of a Century Ago (1878), The Turning Point (1881) and The Void (1884, unfinished).

== Biography ==
Boleslav Markevich was born and died in Saint Petersburg, as a member of a noble Russian family of Polish descent. He spent his early years in Kiev and Volynskaya gubernia and received a good home education. In 1836 the family moved to Odessa where he studied first in the Richelieu Lyceum's gymnasium, then at the Lyceum's law faculty. It was there that he first started to write poetry, critical essays and translations from French, some of which were published by the Odessky Vestnik newspaper.

Markevich started his state-official career in Saint Petersburg, then in 1843 he moved to Moscow to join the local governor Arseny Zakrevsky's office. He became a stalwart at both Petersburg and Moscow's aristocracy saloons and, reportedly, had immense success, with women especially, due to good looks, sense of humour, penchant for showmanship and a considerable dramatic talent.

Markevich, who was close to government circles and was among the most ardent of Mikhail Katkov's right-wing allies, caused much controversy by depicting real life political and popular figures in his prose, the latter serving as a source of rumours, consumed avidly by the public. Praised by conservatives (among them Konstantin Leontiev who compared his trilogy to War and Peace by Leo Tolstoy) and hated by revolutionary democrats (whom he made a point to paint in the blackest possible tones, insisting that for the 'progressivist' disease "the whip is the best cure").

Markevich made his mark in the history of 19th century Russian literature as a tendentious novelist, and a friend of Katkov. He's found himself at the center of at least two scandals, the first caused by his highly publicised row with Ivan Turgenev, the second having to do with alleged bribery (which he denied). Markevich's literary gift, though, has never been doubted; his books, which were widely read in Russia (notably by members of the monarch's family) and translated into many languages, contain, according to the 1990 Russian Writers dictionary, "priceless documentary material and are still in need of objective analysis."

== Select works ==
- Marina from Aly Rog (Марина из Алого Рога, 1873)
- Two Masks (Две маски, 1874, novelet)
- A Quarter of a Century Ago (Четверть века назад, 1878, 1st part of the trilogy)
- Princess Tata (Принцесса Тата, 1879, novelet)
- The Forester (Лесник, 1880, novelet)
- The Turning Point (Перелом, 1881, 2nd part of the trilogy)
- The Void (Бездна, 1884, 3rd part of the trilogy, unfinished).

=== Compilations ===
- Short Stories and Novellas (1883, Saint Petersburg)
- The Complete Markevich in 11 volumes (1885, Saint Petersburg; 1912, second edition, Moscow).
