= Moscow Art Theatre production of Hamlet =

1911–12 production of Hamlet by the Moscow Art Theatre

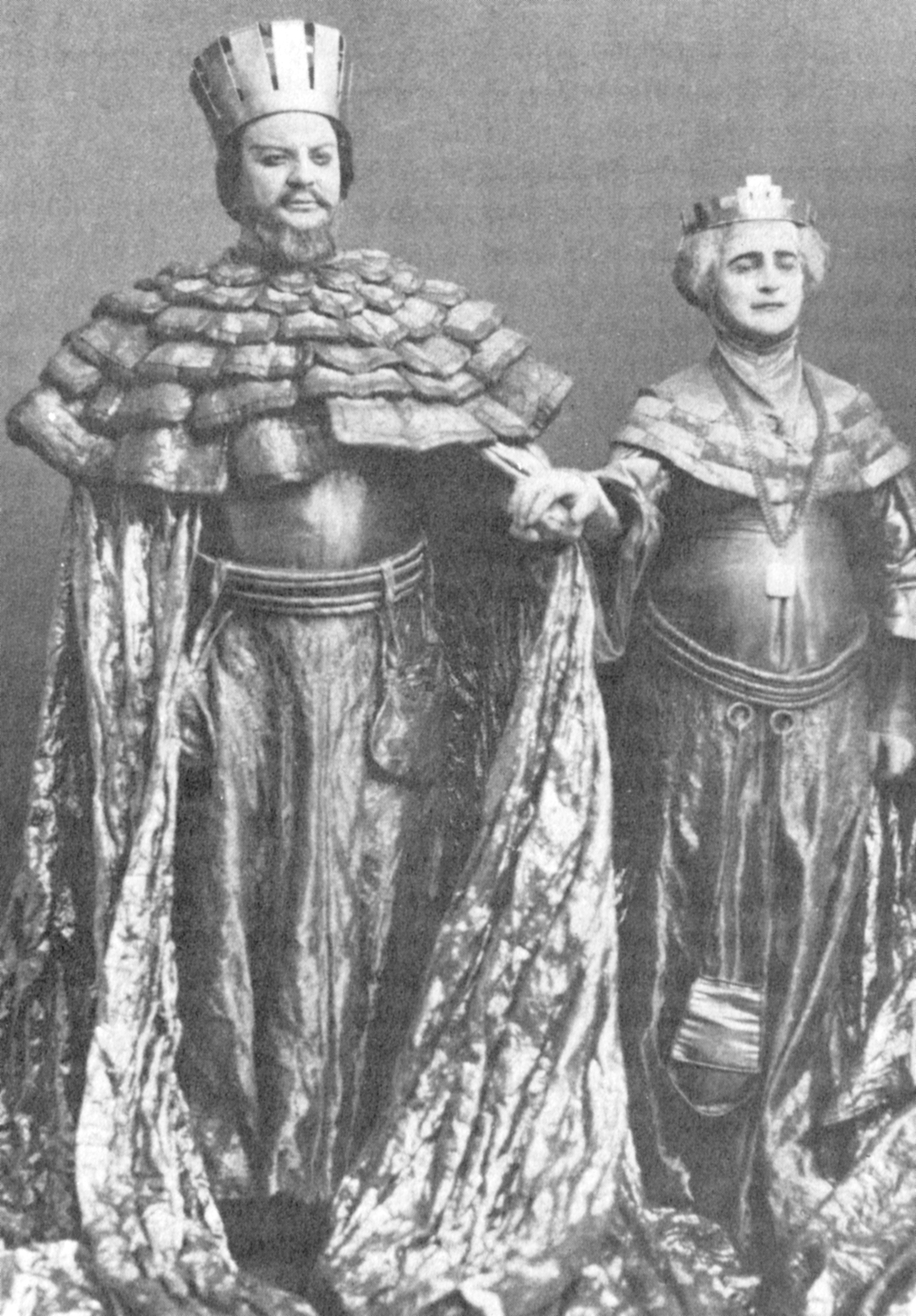
Nikolai Massalitinov as Claudius and Olga Knipper as Gertrude.

The Moscow Art Theatre production of Hamlet was a 1911–12 production of Hamlet, produced by Konstantin Stanislavski and Edward Gordon Craig. It is particularly important in the history of performances of Hamlet and of 20th-century theatre in general. Despite hostile reviews from the Russian press, the production attracted enthusiastic and unprecedented worldwide attention for the theatre, with reviews in Britain's The Times and in the French press that praised its unqualified success. The production placed the Moscow Art Theatre "on the cultural map for Western Europe", and it came to be regarded as a seminal event that influenced the subsequent history of production style in the theatre and revolutionised the staging of Shakespeare's plays in the 20th century. It became "one of the most famous and passionately discussed productions in the history of the modern stage."

== Chronology of production ==
The story of Craig and Stanislavski began in 1908 when the eccentric American dancer Isadora Duncan, who had a daughter with Craig, introduced the two to each other. Craig, an English theatre practitioner, had garnered interest for the symbolist and simple designs he brought to plays like Henrik Ibsen's The Vikings at Helgeland. On the other end of the spectrum Konstantin Stanislavski was creating a world of theatre based upon realism, the internal complexities of the mind, and the rise of psychology. As Benedetti stated, "Stanislavski hoped to use the production to prove that his recently developed 'system' for creating internally justified, realistic acting could meet the formal demands of a classic play". In response to the enthusiasm expressed by Isadora Duncan about Craig's work, Stanislavski encouraged the board of the Moscow Art Theatre to invite Craig to Moscow. He arrived in October 1908.

The board decided in January 1909 to mount the production during its 1910 season, with work on the project to commence immediately.

Rehearsals began in March 1909. In April, Craig returned to Russia, meeting with Stanislavski in Saint Petersburg, where the company was on tour. Together they analysed the play scene-by-scene, then line-by-line, and devised a meticulous production plan, which included sound, lighting, and an outline of the blocking. Since neither understood the other's language, they conducted their discussions in a mixture of English and German. This paired with the fact that Craig spent little time at rehearsal with the actors, caused the cast to say Craig was extremely difficult to work with. Craig spent more of his time with a built-to-scale replica of the set, where he used woodcuts of the actors to devise blocking. Craig was also highly demanding with Alisa Koonen, who played Ophelia, saying on his directions, "no actress could do it". This had much to do with his wish of the actor to be an Ubermarionette; that is, an actor who allowed the director complete and total control. They relocated to Moscow in May and worked together until the beginning of June, when Stanislavski left for Paris.

In February 1910, Craig returned to Moscow. In the intervening period, Stanislavski had developed an important production of Turgenev's A Month in the Country, whose success had demonstrated the value of his new 'systematic' approach to the actor's work; he was keen to assay its virtues in the crucible of Shakespeare's tragedy. They planned to rehearse the company together until April, after which Stanislavski would rehearse alone until the summer. In August, Craig would return once more and the production would open in November 1910.

As it was, Stanislavski was diagnosed with typhoid fever in August and the production was postponed until the next season; Stanislavski was unable to return to rehearsals until April 1911. The play finally opened on 5 January 1912 [O.S. 23 December 1911].

== Cast ==
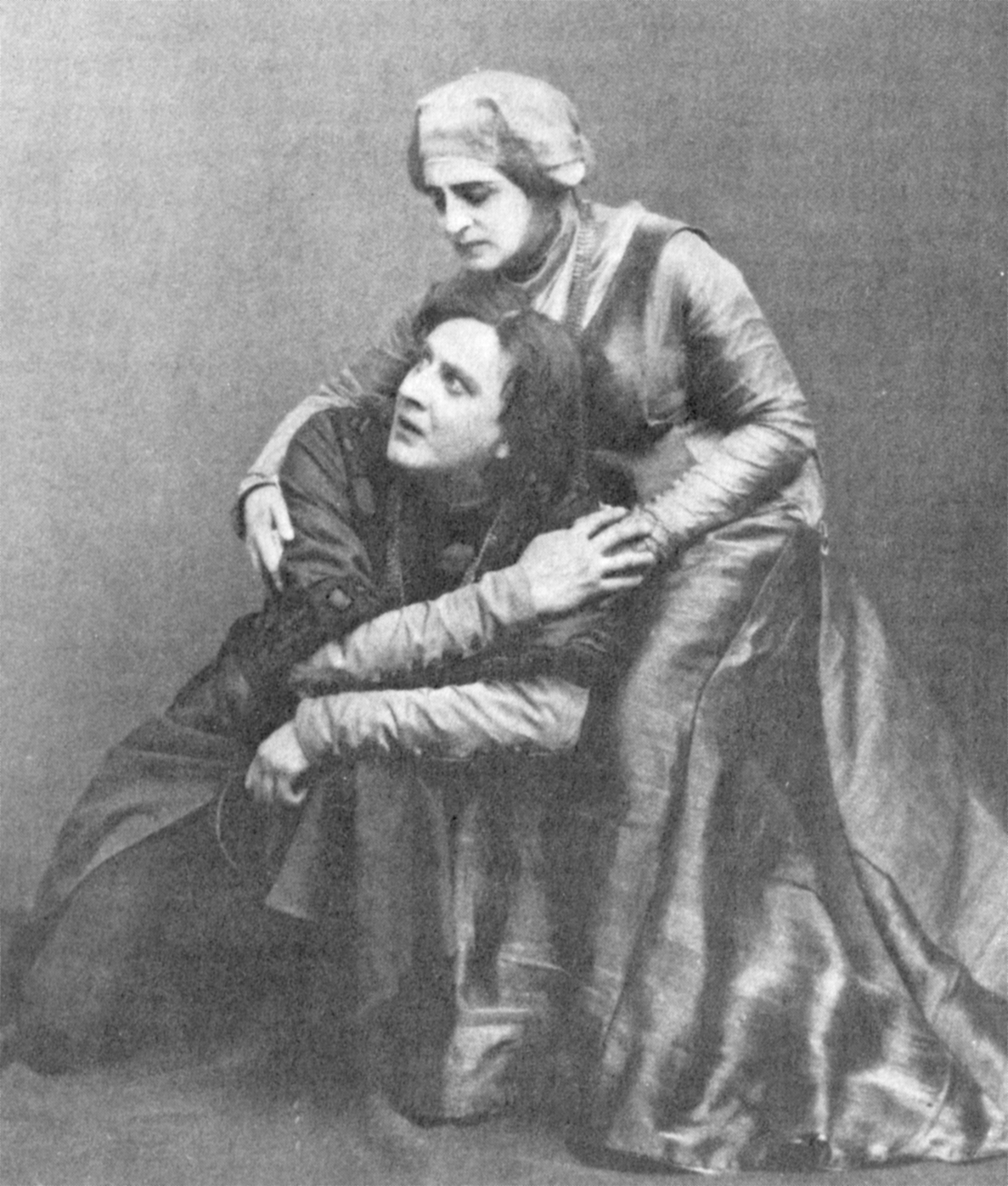
Vasili Kachalov as Hamlet and Olga Knipper as Gertrude (3.4).

The cast for the opening-night performance were:

- Hamlet: Vasili Kachalov
- Claudius: Nikolai Massalitinov
- Gertrude: Olga Knipper
- Ophelia: Olga Gzovskaïa
- Laertes: Richard Boleslavsky
- Polonius: Vasily Luzhsky
- Horatio: Konstantin Khokhlov
- Rosencrantz: Sergey Voronov
- Guildenstern: Boris Sushkevich
- Osric: V. Tezavrovsky
- Ghost of Hamlet's father: Nikolai Znamensky
- Fortinbras: Ivan Bersenev
- Player King: Alexander Vishnevsky
- Player Queen: P. Zharikov
- 3rd actor/Lucianus: Boris Afonin
- 4th actor/Prologue: A. Bondyrev
- Bernardo: Boris Afonin
- 1st Gravedigger: Vladimir Gribunin
- 2nd Gravedigger: Polikarp Pavlov
- Priest: I. Lazarev
- Francisco: Nikolai Podgorny
- Marcellus: Pyotr Baksheev
- Voltimand: A. Barov
- Cornelius: Bolti

== Aesthetic approaches ==
The day we see Hamlet die in the theatre, something of him dies for us. He is dethroned by the spectre of an actor, and we shall never be able to keep the usurper out of our dreams.

— Maurice Maeterlinck (1890).

When Stanislavski extended his invitation to Craig in April 1908, he was completely overcome by his eagerness to work with progressive theatre artists. However, Stanislavski was unaware of how vastly different his vision for the future was from Craig's. Following his failed experiment with Meyerhold and the studio, Stanislavski began to emphasize the importance of the actor. He believed that "neither the set, nor the director, nor the designer can carry the play…it is in the hands of the actor". It was this principle that drove him to significantly reconsider the approach of the actor. By the time Stanislavski became aware of Craig, he was beginning to develop the concepts that would later serve as the backbone for his "system". He was determined that good acting came from internal motivations rather than outward shows. While Stanislavski's ideas centered almost entirely on the role of the actor, Craig's vision of a new theatre minimized the actors’ importance to that of an instrument through which the director's vision is brought to life. "The actor must no longer express himself, but something else; he must no longer imitate, but indicate". In Craig's opinion good theatre required a unity of all elements under the control of one person.

In line with a tendency within the Symbolist movement to view Shakespeare's play as a work of poetry rather than as one for the stage, Craig wrote in his influential manifesto The Art of the Theatre (1905) that it "has not the nature of a stage representation." The playwright Maurice Maeterlinck (whom Stanislavski visited in the summer of 1908 to discuss his forthcoming production of The Blue Bird) had argued 15 years earlier that many of the greatest dramas in the history of theatre, including Hamlet, were "not stageable." In 1908, Craig again insisted that an adequate staging of the play was "impossible." When he suggested the play to the Moscow Art Theatre, he wanted "to test my theory that the Shakespearean play does not naturally belong to the art of the theatre."

Craig conceived of the production as a symbolist monodrama in which every aspect of production would be subjugated to the play's protagonist: the play would present a dream-like vision as seen through Hamlet's eyes. To support this interpretation, Craig wanted to add archetypal, symbolic figures—such as Madness, Murder, and Death—and to have Hamlet present on-stage during every scene, silently observing those in which he did not participate. Stanislavski overruled him. Stanislavski wished the actors to accompany the text with raw palpable emotion, of course, never straying far away from his system. Meanwhile, Craig sought for the actors to not try and make their characters emotional state present. This did not mean he wanted a dead show but on the contrary he believed the text clearly stated each character's motives and feelings. He strove for simplicity that Kaoru Osanai, in the Educational Theatre Journal, calls "simplicity in expression not in content." So in some scenes where Stanislavski wanted many actions to take place Craig wished for little to no movement to let the poetry take the lead.

Despite this apparent opposition between Craig's symbolist aesthetic and Stanislavski's psychological realism, however, the two did share some artistic assumptions; the 'system' had developed out of Stanislavski's experiments with symbolist drama, which had shifted the emphasis of his approach from a naturalistic external surface to the inner world of the character's "spirit". Both had stressed the importance of achieving a unity of all theatrical elements in their work. In a letter written in February 1909 to Liubov Gurevich about his recent production of Gogol's The Government Inspector, Stanislavski confirmed his "return to realism" but expressed the belief that this would not hinder the collaboration:

Of course, we have returned to realism, to a deeper, more refined and more psychological realism. Let us get a little stronger in it and we shall once more continue on our quest. That is why we have invited Gordon Craig. After wandering about in search of new ways, we shall again return to realism for more strength. I do not doubt that every abstraction on the stage, such as impressionism, for instance, could be attained by way of a more refined and deeper realism. All other ways are false and dead.

Craig's and Stanislavski's interpretations of the central role of Shakespeare's play, however, were quite different. Stanislavski's vision of Hamlet was as an active, energetic and crusading character, whereas Craig saw him as a representation of a spiritual principle, caught in a mutually destructive struggle with the principle of matter as embodied in all that surrounded him. Hamlet's tragedy, Craig felt, was that he talks rather than acts.

== Visual design ==
The most famous aspect of the production is Craig's use of a single, plain set that varied from scene to scene by means of large, abstract screens that altered the size and shape of the acting area. There is a persistent theatrical myth that these screens were impractical and fell over during the first performance. This myth may be traced to a passage in Stanislavski's My Life in Art (1924); Craig demanded that Stanislavski delete the story and Stanislavski admitted that the incident occurred only during a rehearsal. He eventually provided Craig with a sworn statement that the mishap was due to an error by the stage-hands and not the design of Craig's screens. The screens had been built ten feet taller than Craig's designs specified, which may have also contributed to the mishap. Craig had envisaged specially costumed, visible stage-hands to move the screens, but Stanislavski had rejected the idea. This forced a curtain close and delay between scenes, which disrupted the sense of fluidity and movement inherent to Craig's conception. The different arrangements of the screens for each scene were used to provide a spatial representation of Hamlet's state of mind or to underline a dramaturgical progression across a sequence of scenes, as visual elements were retained or transformed. In terms of costume design there were also differences between the two artists. For example, in the scene containing the dumb show Craig wished for the Actors to wear oversized masks, but Stanislavski despised this idea as it did not ring true to a realistic style of acting. Eventually there was a compromise which allowed the actors to wear makeup along with extravagant beards and wigs.

The kernel of Craig's monodramatic interpretation lay in the staging of the first court scene (1.2). The stage was divided sharply into two areas through the use of lighting: the background was brightly lit, while the foreground was dark and shadowy. The screens were lined up along the back wall and bathed in diffuse yellow light. From a high throne upon which Claudius and Gertrude sat, which was bathed in a diagonal, bright golden beam, a pyramid descended, representing the feudal hierarchy. The pyramid gave the illusion of a single, unified golden mass, from which the courtier's heads appeared to stick out through slits in the material. In the foreground in dark shadow, Hamlet lay slouched, as if dreaming. A gauze was hung between Hamlet and the court, further emphasising the division. On Claudius' exit-line the figures remained in place while the gauze was loosened, so that the entire court appeared to melt away before the audience's eyes, as if they had been a projection of Hamlet's thoughts that now had turned elsewhere. The scene, and the gauze effect in particular, prompted an ovation from the audience, which was unheard of at the Moscow Art Theatre.

== Reception ==
The production was met with highly critical reviews from the Russian press, whose complaints were mostly all pointed towards Craig. One critic described the performance as being "smothered by Craig’s screens". The overall opinion of the Russian critics was that Craig's modern concept distracted from the play itself. However, Nikolay Efros, insisted that despite the flaws of the production, the theatre must be admired for the things that they aspired to achieve, and the immense amount of work they put in. The press in England was much kinder, and rumors spread very quickly through western Europe of the great triumph of Craig's vision, despite the production in actuality being a complete failure. While Olga Knipper (Gertrude), Nikolai Massalitinov (Claudius) and Olga Gzovskaia (Ophelia) received poor reviews in the Russian press, Vasili Kachalov's performance as Hamlet was praised as a genuine achievement, one which succeeded in displacing the legend of Mochalov's mid-19th-century Romantic Hamlet.

Looking back on the production years later, Craig felt that it had been like "taking God Almighty into a music-hall."

== See also ==
- Moscow Art Theatre production of The Seagull

== Gallery ==
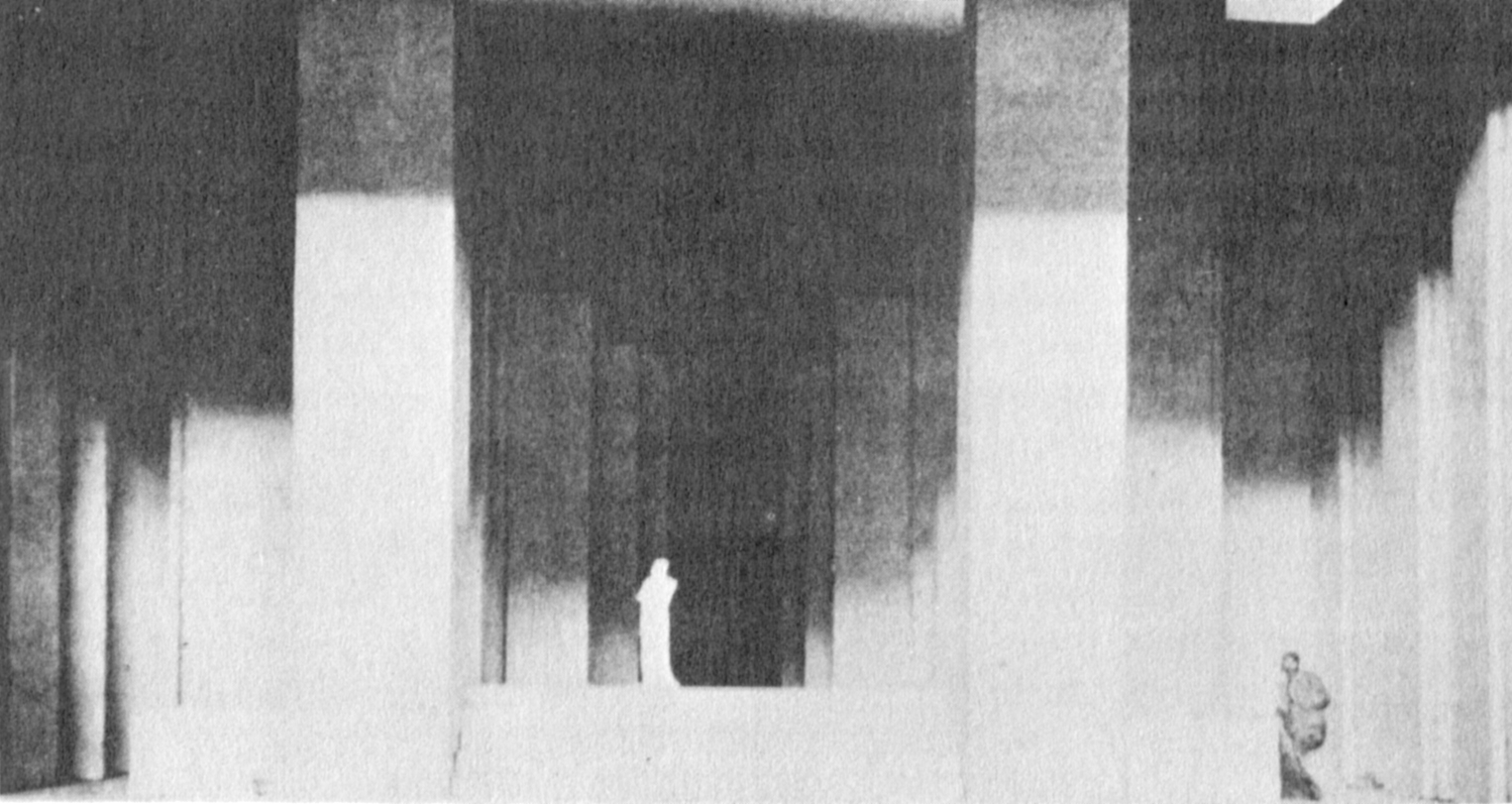
Craig's model for the final scene.

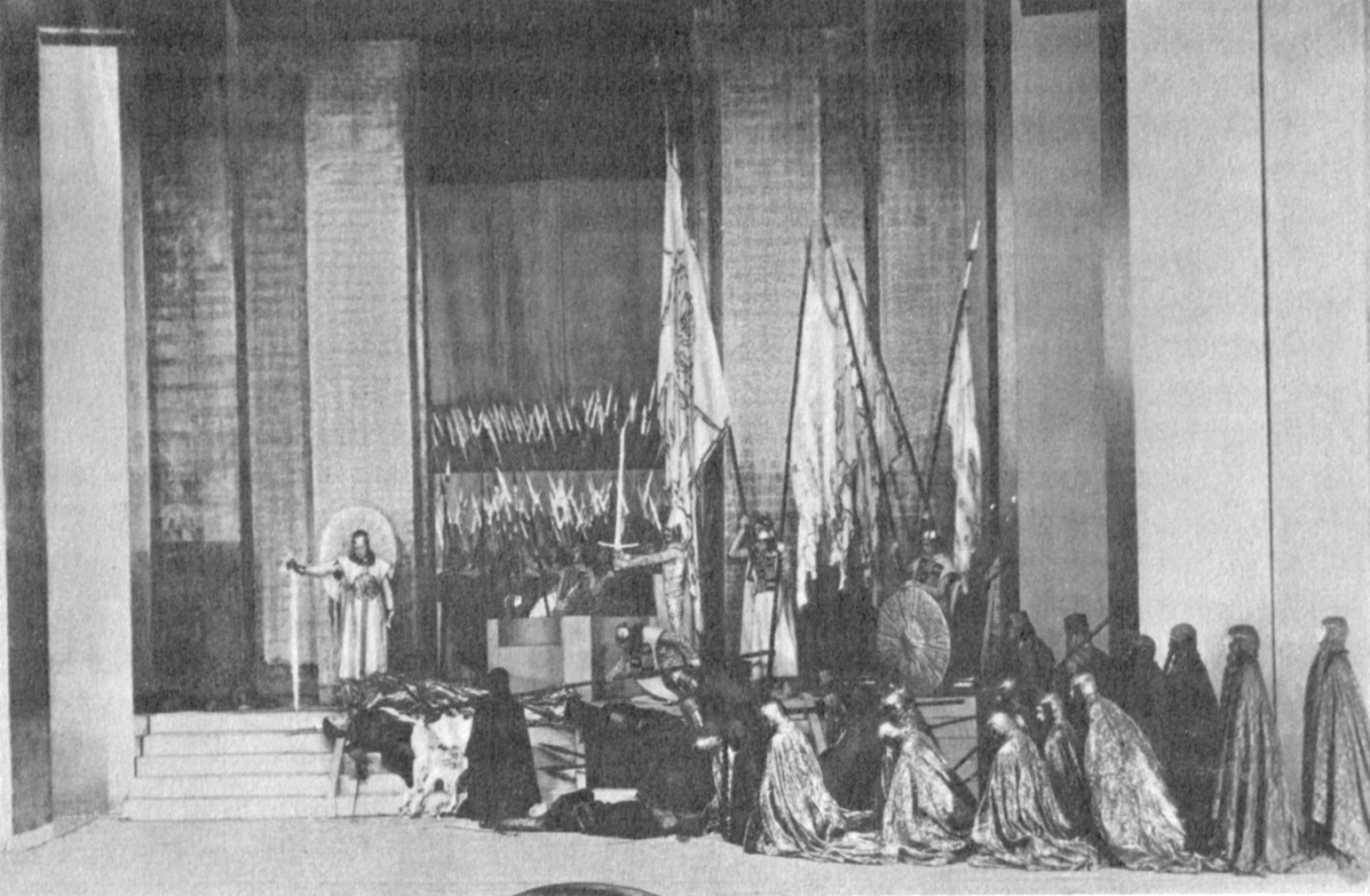
A photograph of the final scene in production.

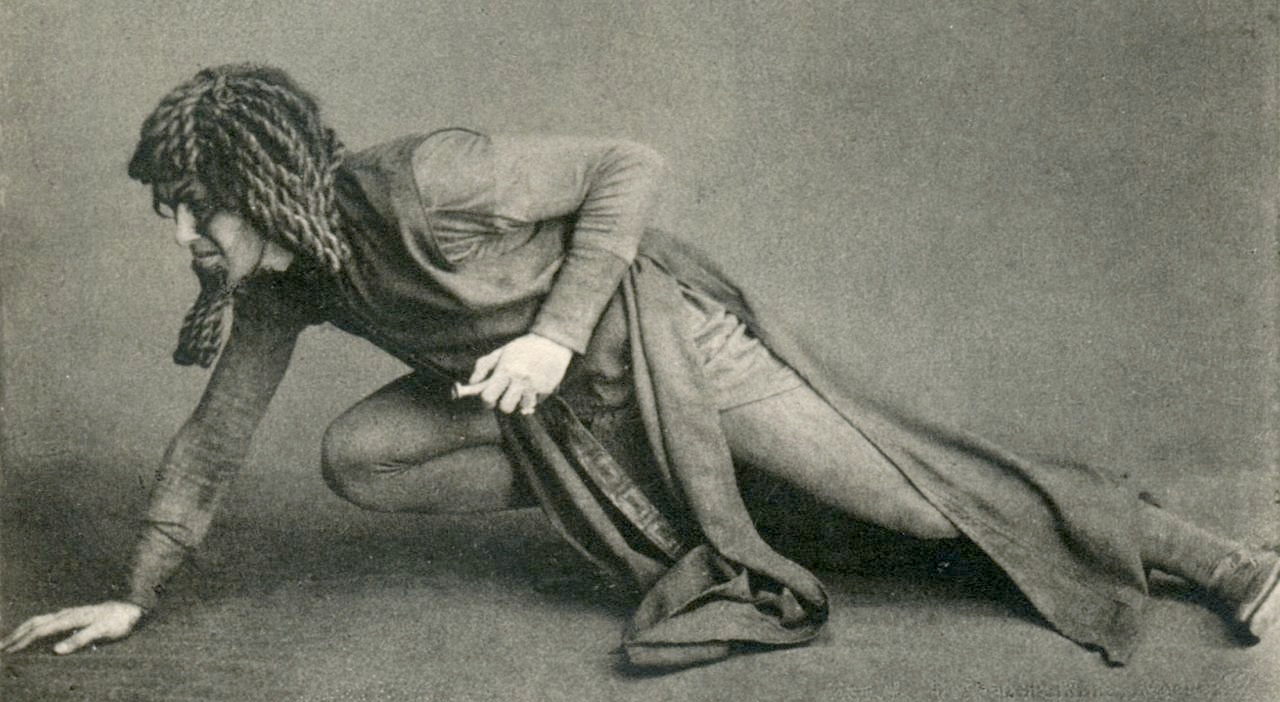
B. M. Alfonin as Lucianus in the play-within-a-play's dumb show.

== Sources ==
- Arnott, Brian. 1975. Towards a New Theatre: Edward Gordon Craig and Hamlet; A Circulating Exhibition Organized by Brian Arnott for the National Programme of the National Gallery of Canada, Ottawa. Ottawa: The National Gallery of Canada. ISBN 978-0-88884-305-0.
- Bablet, Denis. 1962. The Theatre of Edward Gordon Craig. Trans. Daphne Woodward. London: Methuen, 1981. ISBN 978-0-413-47880-1.
- Benedetti, Jean. 1999. Stanislavski: His Life and Art. Revised edition. Original edition published in 1988. London: Methuen. ISBN 0-413-52520-1.
- Innes, Christopher. 1983. Edward Gordon Craig. Directors in Perspective ser. Cambridge: Cambridge University Press. ISBN 0-521-27383-8.
- Osanai, Kaoru, and Andrew T. Tsubaki. 1968. "Gordon Craig's Production of Hamlet at the Moscow Art Theatre." Educational Theatre Journal 20.4 (Dec.): 586–593. doi:10.2307/3205002
- Senelick, Laurence. 1982. Gordon Craig's Moscow Hamlet: a Reconstruction. Contributions in Drama and Theatre Studies 4. Westport, Connecticut: Greenwood P. ISBN 0-313-22495-1.
- Taxidou, Olga. 1998. The Mask: A Periodical Performance by Edward Gordon Craig. Contemporary Theatre Studies ser. volume 30. Amsterdam: Harwood Academic Publishers. ISBN 90-5755-046-6.
- Tutaev, D. 1962. "Gordon Craig Remembers Stanislavsky: A Great Nurse." Theatre Arts 56.4 (April): 17–19.
