= Olga Gzovskaya =

Russian actress

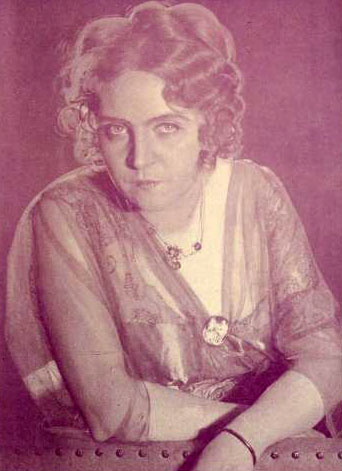
- Born: Olga Vladimirovna Gzovskaya (О́льга Влади́мировна Гзо́вская); 10 October 1883; Moscow, Russian Empire
- Died: 2 July 1962 (aged 78); Leningrad, Russian Soviet Federative Socialist Republic, Soviet Union
- Other names: Olga Gsowskaja
- Occupation: Actress

Olga Vladimirovna Gzovskaya (Russian: О́льга Влади́мировна Гзо́вская; 10 October 1883 – 2 July 1962) was a Russian and Soviet theater and film actress.

== Life ==
Gzovskaya was born to a family of a Moscow customs official of Polish origin. In 1905, she graduated from the Imperial Drama School at the Maly Theatre, having studied under Aleksandr Pavlovich Lensky. On 1 September 1905 she joined the Maly Theatre troupe, with the first role of Ariel in "The Tempest" by William Shakespeare, that October. From 1905 to 1908, she appeared at the Maly Theatre. In 1907, she met Konstantin Stanislavski at a summer resort and began taking private acting lessons from him. During their classes Stanislavski commented to Gzovskaya that she should perform at the Moscow Art Theatre, which she took as an offer of employment and quit the Maly. As the board had not been consulted, the engagement by the Moscow Art Theatre became contentious and she was forced to tour throughout Russia during the 2008-2009 season. Her employment was also complicated because her fiancé Vladimir Nelidov, who was working at the Maly, was trying to become the manager of the Moscow Art Theatre, but the theater did not trust his reputation. In July 1908, she and Nelidov married.

Gzovskaya returned to the Maly for the 1909-1910 season, but in 1910, she moved to the Moscow Art Theatre. In 1912, she performed a series of engagements in Prague, but was primarily engaged until 1917 at the Moscow Art Theater. Between 1917 and 1919 Gzovskaya returned to the Maly. When Gzovskaya left the Moscow Art Theatre, she severed her studies with Stanislavski, though she tried to promote use of his method in other companies. In 1919, she taught at the studio and toured with the Chialiapin Studio and Opera Studio of the Bolshoi Theatre.

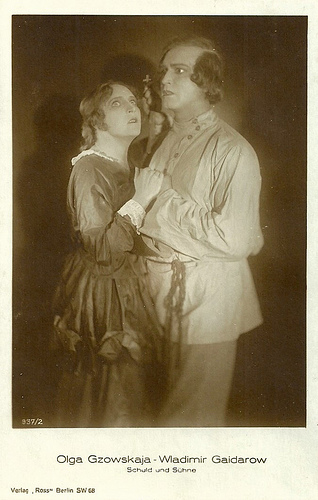
German postcard by Ross-Verlag, no. 937/2, 1925-1926. Vladimir Gajdarov and Gzovskaya in Schuld und Sühne, an adaptation of Dostojevsky's Crime and Punishment (Raskolnikov).

In November 1920, together with her husband, actor Vladimir Gajdarov and a few other artists she went abroad. It happened so unexpectedly that none of the actors were ready to leave. They toured in Ukraine, but the Russian Civil War in 1919, cut them off from Moscow. People were trying to survive, gradually they were joined by other Moscow artists who also found themselves cut off as in other parts of the country, including several actors of the Sinelnikov troupe. As a result, there was quite a large group of well-known theater figures, which included, in addition to Gzovskaya and Gaydarov, Alla Tarasova, Vasily Kachalov, his wife Nina Litovtseva, Olga Knipper, M.N. Nablotskaya, her husband actor Putyata, Nikolai Massalitinov, Yury Rakitin, Vladimir Zhedrinsky, M.A. Kryzhanovskaya, Maria Germanova, E.N. Roshchin-Insarov, Peter F. Sharov and many others. They decided to stay together. Katchalov and LItovtseva's son, Vadim Shverubovich, wrote about this episode in the history of the Moscow Art Theater and in the lives of his parents.

Gzovskaya worked in Estonia, Latvia and Lithuania, Czechoslovakia, Yugoslavia, Poland and Germany, where, together with her husband she organized a studio. But they failed to maintain it. At the Berlin City Opera in 1926 Gzovskaya performed "Queen of Spades" by Pyotr Ilyich Tchaikovsky. On her return in 1932 to the USSR, she worked in concert organizations in Moscow. In November 1934 she moved to Leningrad, where she continued in concert and presented a few literary compositions. In 1939, she arrived in Leningrad's Leninsky Komsomol Theatre. At the outbreak of World War II she was evacuated to Novosibirsk, where she continued her theatrical work, staged "Tyrant" by Goldoni and "Little House in Cherkizovo" by Aleksei Arbuzov. From March 1943 to 1956 she worked for the Alexandrinsky Theatre. In addition, she led the amateur clubs House of Scientists, Club of Seamen, and others.

She was buried in Moscow in Vvedenskoye Cemetery.

== Roles ==
=== Maly Theatre (Moscow) ===
- Ariel (The Tempest by William Shakespeare)
- Beatrice (Much Ado About Nothing by William Shakespeare)
- Erik (Youth by Max Dreyer)
- Thea (Celebration of Life by Hermann Sudermann)
- Irene (Golden Fleece by Stanisław Przybyszewski)
- Klerhen (Sunset by Franz Beyerleyn)
- Natasha (Over Life by Nikolai Shklyar)
- Kathy (Old Heidelberg by Wilhelm Meyer-Förster)
- Desdemona (Othello by William Shakespeare),
- Marina Mniszek (The False Dmitry by Alexander Ostrovsky)
- Cleopatra (Caesar and Cleopatra by George Bernard Shaw)
- Miss Mabel Chiltern (An Ideal husband by Oscar Wilde)
- Cherubino (The Marriage of Figaro by Pierre Beaumarchais)

=== In 1917–1919 years ===
- Sophia (Woe from Wit by Alexander Griboyedov)
- Salome (Salome by Oscar Wilde)
- Lydia Cheboksarova (Easy Money by Alexander Ostrovsky)

=== Moscow Art Theatre ===
- Ophelia (Hamlet by William Shakespeare),
- Tuanet (The Imaginary Invalid by Molière),
- Mirandolina (The Mistress of the Inn by Carlo Goldoni),
- Laura (The Stone Guest by Alexander Pushkin),
- Katerina Ivanovna (The Brothers Karamazov, after Fyodor Dostoevsky's novel)
- Tina (Miserere by Semyon Yushkevich)
- Vera Libanova (It Tears Where It Is Thin by Ivan Turgenev)

=== Leningrad Theatre. Lenin Komsomol ===
- Beatrice ("Much Ado About Nothing" by William Shakespeare),
- Mamaev ("Even a Wise Man Stumbles" Ostrovsky).

=== Leningrad Drama Theatre ===
- The old woman (The Chimes of Kremlin, by Nikolai Pogodin)
- Mrs. Eynsford-Hill (Pygmalion by George Bernard Show)
- Grandmother Arsenyeva (Lermontov by Boris Lavrenyov, her last role)

=== Selected filmography ===
- Mara Kramskaya (Mara Kramskaya, 1915).
- Woman with Dagger (Lena Rokotoff, director Yakov Protazanov)
- Tasia (Landowner's daughter, director Yakov Protazanov)
- Hurricane (Natasha, director Boris Sushkevich)
- Panna Mary (Panna Mary, director Yakov Protazanov, 1916)
- Flurry (Tanya, director Czesław Sabinsky, 1917)
- Anelya (the victim, Czesław Sabinsky, 1917)
- And the Mystery Was Swallowed by the Waves... (Lilias the dancer, Czesław Sabinsky, 1917)
- No Blood is Necessary (Olga Pernovskaya, director Yakov Protazanov, 1918)
- Jenny the Housemaid (Jenny, Yakov Protazanov)
- Witches (Maruna-Yola, director V.Starevich, 1918)
- The Thieving Magpie (director Alexander Sanin, 1920)
- Madame de La Pommeraye's Intrigues (director, Fritz Wendhausen, 1922)
- Enjoy Your Life (Olga, director G.Azagarov, 1923, shooting in Munich)
- Psyche (Psyche, director Yu. Larin 1927, shooting in Berlin)
- Songs of the Steppe (Rogoznaya, director Yakov Urinov, 1932-1933).

== See also ==
- Moscow Art Theatre production of Hamlet

== Literature ==
- Russian Berlin / Compilation, preface and personalities VV Sorokina. - M .: MGU, 2003. - 368 p. - 3 000 copies. - ISBN 5-211-04077-5. (A lane.)
