= Alexander Adashev =

Russian and Soviet stage actor and reader in drama

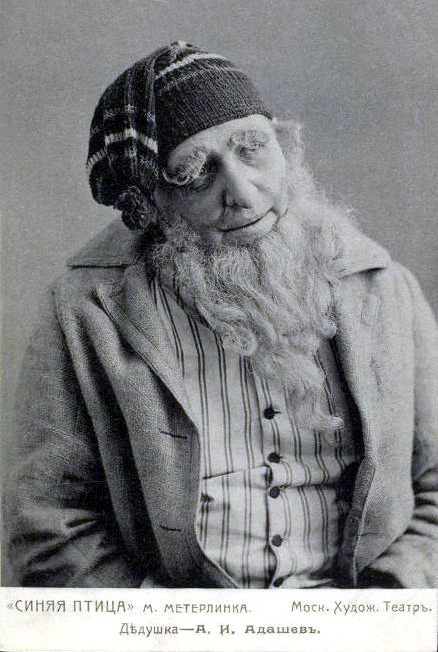
- Adashev as Grandpa in Blue Bird by Maeterlinck (c.1908)
- Born: Alexander Ivanovich Platonov; 1871; Russian Empire
- Died: 1934 (aged 62–63); Soviet Union
- Occupation: stage actor

Alexander Ivanovich Platonov (Russian: Александр Иванович Платонов, 1871–1934) was a Russian and Soviet stage actor and reader in drama, better known under his stage name Adashev (Адашев) and associated with the Moscow Art Theatre, in 1898–1913.

== Biography ==
Among his best-received parts there were those of Bassanio (The Merchant of Venice, 1898), the Messenger (Antigone, 1899), Orcino (Twelfth Night, 1899), Alyoshka (The Lower Depths, 1902), Molchalin (Woe from Wit, 1906), Grandfather (The Blue Bird, 1908) and Zemlyanika (Revizor, 1908), of which he was the first performer at MAT.

In 1906 he became the head of the Adashev Drama Courses (with such masters as Leopold Sulerzhitsky, Richard Boleslawski, Vasily Kachalov, Vasily Luzhsky and Nina Litovtseva, teaching). Soon the courses became immensely popular and acquired the status of a preliminary school for actors willing to join MAT. Alumni included Evgeny Vakhtangov, Serafima Birman, Vladimir Gotovtsev and Maria Durasova.

The courses folded in 1913 when most of the students and tutors quit, and Adashev, accused of "violating the norms of morality", was forced to leave Moscow. He spent the rest of his life working in the Russian provinces, out of the spotlight. In 1923–1927 he read drama at the Kiev Russian Drama Theatre.
