= Vakhtang Mchedelov =

Russian theater director and teacher

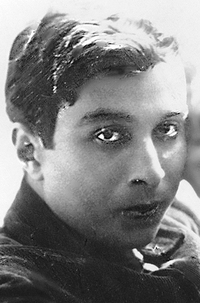
- Born: Vakhtang Levanovich Mchedlishvili ვახტანგ მჭედლიშვილი 6 August 1884; Batumi, Georgia, Russian Empire
- Died: 19 May 1924 (aged 39); Moscow, Russian Empire
- Occupations: stage actor, theatre pedagogue
- Years active: 1904-1924

Vakhtang Levanovich Mchedelov (Russian: Вахтанг Леванович Мчеделов, born Mchedlishvili, Мчедлишвили / Georgian: ვახტანგ მჭედლიშვილი; 6 August 1884 – 19 May 1924) was a Russian theatre director and pedagogue of Georgian origin.

== Biography ==
Born in Batumi, Georgia, Mchedelov joined the Moscow Art Theatre in 1904, first as Stanislavsky's assistant, later to co-direct and direct the MAT productions. In 1913 he started to read drama at the private School of Dramatic Art (run by Massalitinov, Alexandrov and Podgorny and known as the Schools of Three Nikolais) and was "by far the most popular tutor... He loved young people and they reciprocated, he gave us more time and effort than other teachers and we admired him for that," the actor Vsevolod Verbitsky wrote in his memoirs.

As in 1916 the school closed for financial reasons, it was Mchedelov who started to collect the money for the new project which finally materialized as the MAT Second Studio which opened with the premiere of Zinaida Gippius's The Green Ring to a resounding public acclaim. His another big success at the Second Studio was the renewed production of Maurice Maeterlinck's Blue Bird in 1921. A zealous follower of Stanislavski's ideas, Mchedelov in the early 1920s was engaged in most of the theatre's experimental work. He also produced and directed plays at the Theatre of Comedy and the then Moscow-based Jewish Habima Theatre. In 1923 he launched and for a short while was the head of the Georgian Theatre Studio.

Vakhtang Mchedelov died on 19 May 1924 in Moscow. His memoirs are kept at the Theatre Museum in Tbilisi.
