= Maria Germanova =

Russian actress and theatre director

- Мария Германова
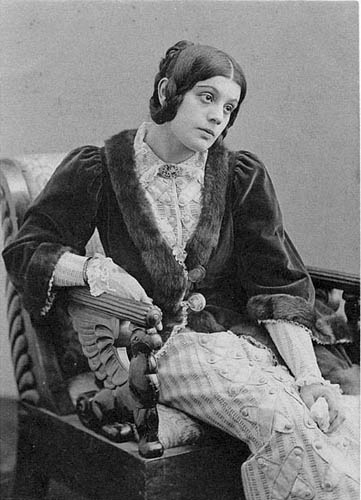
- Born: Maria Nikolayevna Bychkova; 1884; Moscow, Imperial Russia
- Died: 9 April 1940 (aged 55–56); Paris, France
- Occupations: Actress; theatre director; memoirist
- Spouse: Alexander Kalitinsky

Maria Nikolayevna Krasovskaya-Kalitinskaya (Russian: Мария Николаевна Красовская-Калитинская; née Bychkova; Бычкова; 1884 – 9 April 1940) was a Russian actress, theatre director and reader in drama, better known under her stage name Maria Germanova (Мария Германова).

== Biography ==
Maria Bychkova was born in Moscow into a family of Old Believer merchants. She studied at the First Moscow Gymnasium, where Olga Gzovskaya was one of her classmates. In 1901 she enrolled in the just opened Moscow Art Theatre Drama School and a year later joined the MAT troupe, as Maria Germanova.

She debuted in 1903 in Shakespeare's Julius Caesar, then garnered positive reviews as Elena in Maxim Gorky's Children of the Sun (1905), Sofya in Griboyedov's Woe from Wit and Agnes in Henrik Ibsen's Brand (both 1906). It was mostly upon Germanova's stage persona that Vladimir Nemirovich-Danchenko has relied upon in his stage experiments, which included Boris Godunov by Alexander Pushkin (her as Marina Mnishek, 1907), Anathema by Leonid Andreyev (Rosa, 1909), The Karamazov Brothers by Dostoyevsky (Grushenka, 1910), Leo Tolstoy's The Living Corpse (Lisa Protasova, 1911). "The physical beauty, the reverberating nerve beat, the sharp perceptiveness" (according to the biographer Inna Solovyova) as well as her love of modernism ('decadent' was also the word that has been used to describe her close circle of friends) made Germanova one of the rising stars of the early 1900s' Russian theatre scene, and "a promising tragic actress in the vein of Duse".

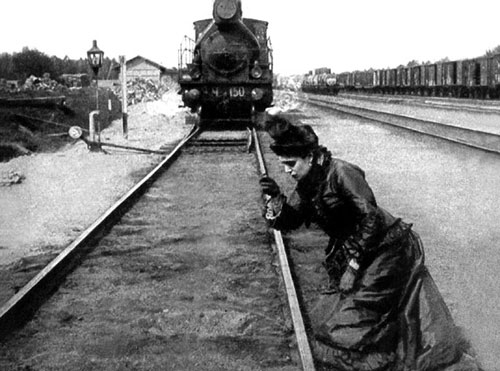
Anna Karenina, 1914

In 1914–1924 Germanova starred in five Russian silent films, starting with Anna Karenina in 1914, directed by Vladimir Gardin and produced by Paul Timan.

In 1919 Germanova left Moscow, first for Kiev, then Rostov-on-Don. She joined the Kachalov Troupe and with it toured outside Soviet Russia in 1919–1922. During this time she revived most of her best-known parts of the past (Grushenka in The Karamazov Brothers, Ekaterina Ivanovna in Leonid Andreyev's eponymous play, Olga in Anton Chekhov's Three Sisters, Mamayeva in Ostrovsky's Enough Stupidity in Every Wise Man) and added to her repertoire Elena Andreyevna in Chekhov's Uncle Vanya.

In 1922, along with several of her colleagues Germanova refused to return to Moscow. In 1923 Nemirovich-Danchenko sent her a telegram inviting her to take part in his new musical theatre project, but this offer was declined. Instead, Germanova arrived at Prague where her husband, the archeologist and art historian Alexander Kalitinsky has been lecturing at the Archeology Institute (which he in 1925 became the director of) and soon, along with Nikolai Massalitinov, co-founded and became the director of what soon came to be known as the Prague MAT Troupe. Her repertoire now included also the parts of Ranevskaya (Chekhov's The Cherry Orchard), the Queen (The King of the Dark Chamber by Rabindranath Tagore), Ellida Wangel (The Lady from the Sea by Ibsen), Katerina (The Storm by Alexander Ostrovsky) and Medea by Euripides.

After the Prague Troupe disbanded in 1927, Germanova took part in the productions staged by the Georges Pitoeff and Gaston Baty. In late 1920s she started working as theatre director herself. In 1929 she went to the US and that year succeeded Richard Boleslawski as the head of the American Laboratory Theatre, where she produced Chekhov's Three Sisters. The Lab, as it was known, disbanded in 1933, but proved to be an important link between Stanislavski and the New York's Group Theatre. Germanova died in Paris in 1940. Her book of memoirs My Casket of Treasures (Мой ларец с драгоценностями) appeared posthumously. It was published in its full version by the Russki Put Publishers in Moscow, in 2012.

== Selected parts gallery ==
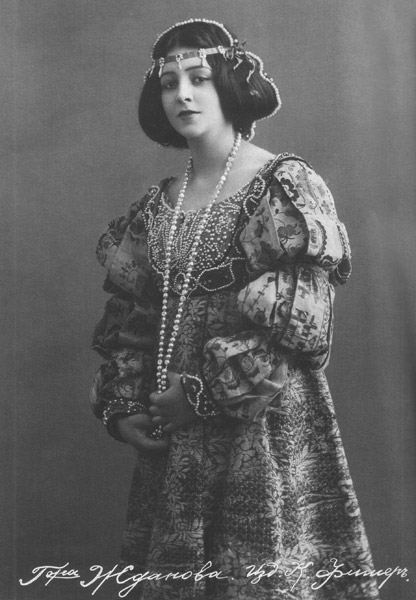
1907: Marina Mnishek, Boris Godunov

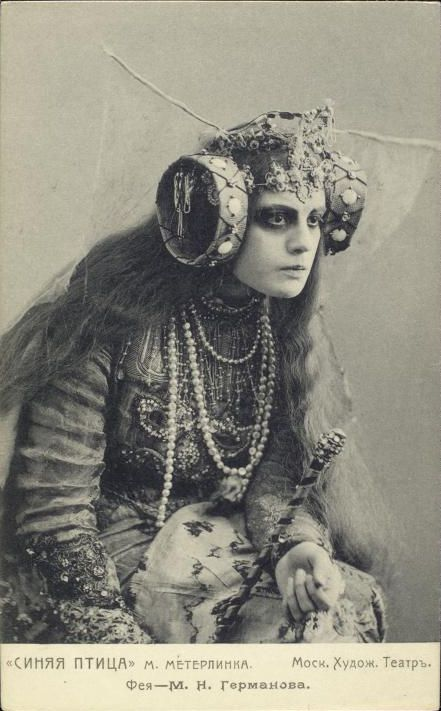
1908: The Fairy, The Blue Bird

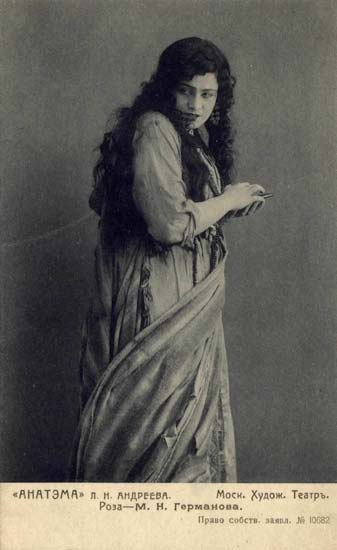
1909: Rosa, Leonid Andreyev's Anathema

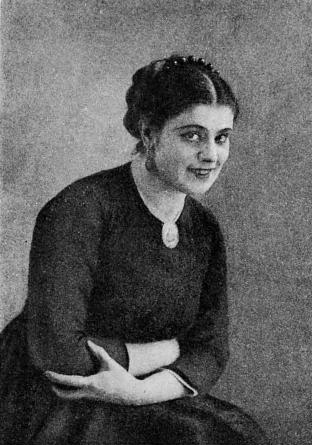
1910: Grushenka, The Karamazov Brothers

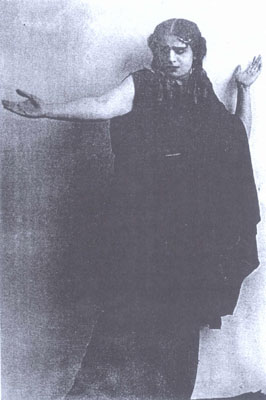
1926: Medea
