= Uralov =

Uralov (Russian: Уралов) is a Russian masculine surname originating from the region name of Ural; its feminine counterpart is Uralova. It may refer to

- Ilya Uralov (1872–1920), Russian stage actor
- Mikhail Uralov (1889–c. 1949), Russian anarchist
- Yulen Uralov (1924–2026), Soviet Olympic fencer
