= Ekaterina Vasilieva =

Ekaterina Vasilieva may refer to:

- Ekaterina Aleksandrovna Vasilieva (born 1976), water polo player
- Ekaterina Vasilieva (figure skater) (born 1986), Russian pair skater
- Yekaterina Vasilyeva (born 1945), Russian actress
- Ekaterina Vasilyeva (19th-century actress)(1829–1877), Russian actress
