= Elena Muratova =

Elena Muratova may refer to:

- Elena Muratova (skier)
- Elena Muratova (actress)
