= The Green Ring =

1915 four-act play by Zinaida Gippius

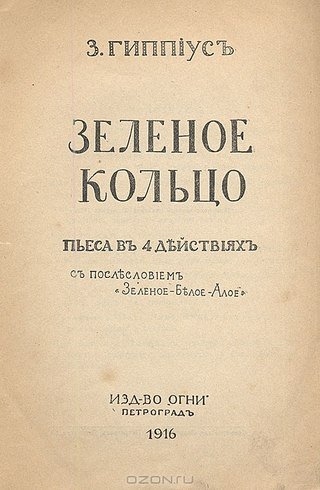
- Original language: Russian
- Written by: Zinaida Gippius
- Subject: Teenage angst, collapse of the family, collectivism
- Genre: Realistic drama
- Setting: Early 1910s Saint Petersburg

Premiere
- Date: 18 February 1915
- Place: Alexandrinsky Theatre

The Green Ring (Russian: Зелёное кольцо, romanized: Zelyonoye kol’tso) is a four-act play by Zinaida Gippius written in January 1914 and premiered at the Alexandrinsky Theatre on 18 February 1915, directed by Vsevolod Meyerhold. The Moscow Art Theatre production, directed by Vakhtang Mchedelov, opened on 7 December 1916. The play was first published in Petrograd in 1916 by the Ogni Publishers.

== Background ==
The Green Ring, a play about 'fathers and sons' of the new generation, was written in January 1914. In 1933 Gippius remembered: "It was about the pre-War youth, the teenagers of the time. The concocted storyline aside, it all came out of my own communication with the young people of Saint Petersburg, the ones who attended my 'Sundays'."

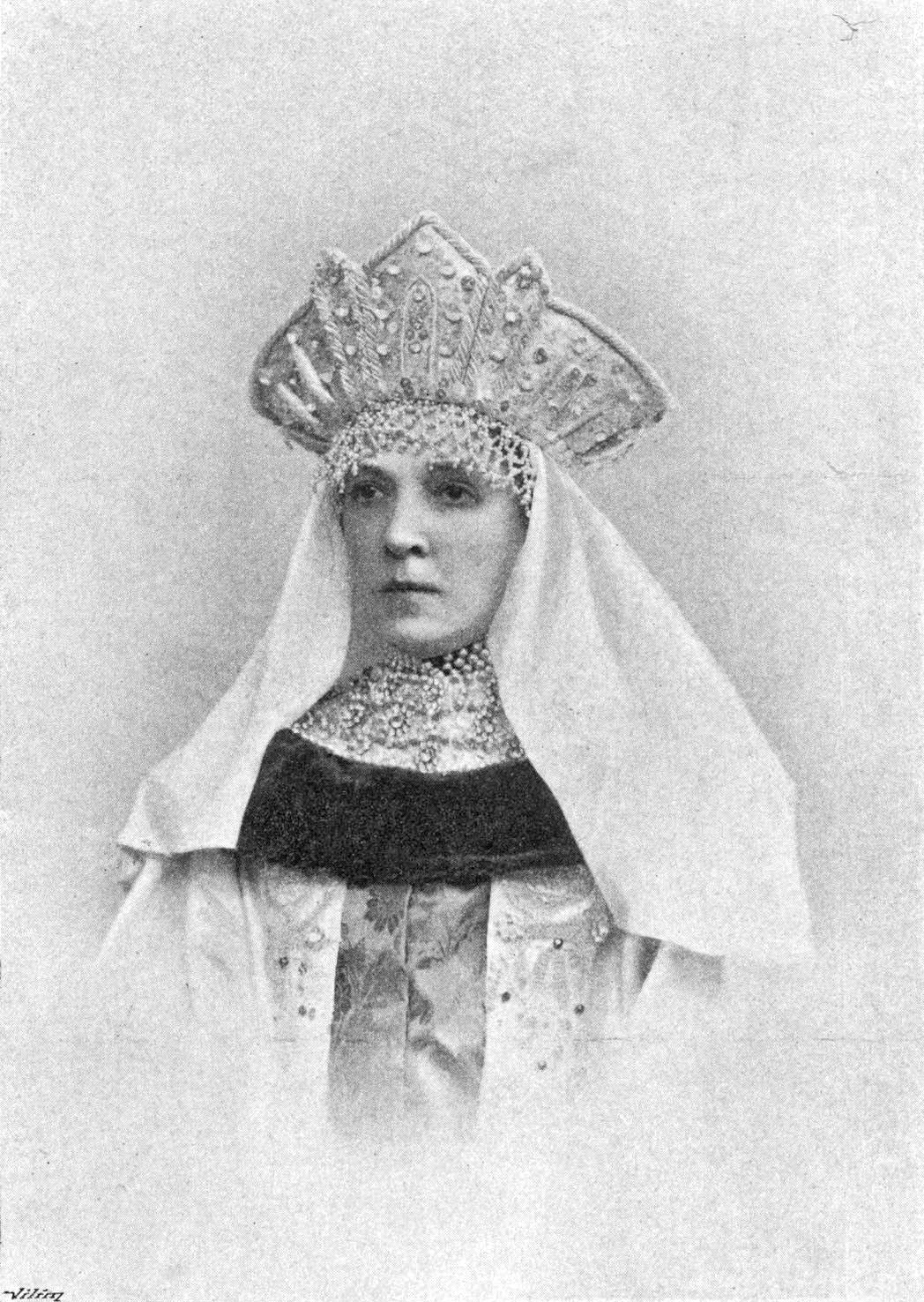
Maria Savina, the legendary 'Queen of Alexandrinka', was instrumental in getting the play produced against all odds.

As the director Vsevolod Meyerhold and the Alexandrinka cast started to rehearse the play, the major setback occurred. The play had to be taken through the Theatrical Committee. "Since Merezhkovsky was a member of it in Saint Petersburg, we sent it anonymously to its Moscow department. To our utter amazement the local old geezers, while praising its literary merits, refused to accept it as 'immoral', on the grounds that children there read Hegel and behave without proper respect to their elders," Gippius wrote in her 1933 memoirs. "This was scandalous. The director instantly wanted to see this joke of a protocol, we started to think of how to appease these old men with as little fuss as possible. Then the War broke out, everything turned upside down, I stopped even thinking of plays," she remembered in her Blue Book of memoirs. "...Then, before Christmas, something extraordinary happened. Savina who'd read my play (which Meyerhold had sent her) decided she was eager to have a part in it!.. There was not much to play for her in it, the part of an ageing youngish mother was small and confined to just one single act, although it was hardly an easy one... But whatever the queen of Alexandrinka demands, is hers for the taking! And the whole thing has got a re-start."

Savina insisted upon meeting the author and, much to Gippius surprise, subjected her to detailed questioning as to the nature of her character. "Apparently Gippius' play had awakened in her deep memories of the youth spent in a dysfunctional family, with her own mother, no dissimilar to Elena Ivanovna," the theatre historian Irina Arzamastseva suggested. Gippius enjoyed these conversations a lot. In her memoirs on Savina she remarked how off-stage the actress was so much more intriguing and exciting than even when actually acting.

The Green Ring was not the first Russian play to feature troubled teenagers. Its 'spiritual' predecessor was considered to be Spring Awakening by Frank Wedekind, staged and directed in 1907 by Vsevolod Meyerhold. Later critics found parallels in it to Ivan Turgenev's A Month in the Country, in which the very young Savina excelled as Verochka, notably in her 1879 benefit showcase. Not only did Gippius' play look like a development of Turgenev's ideas concerning the right of the youngsters to make their own decisions in life, but it was also close to it stylistically, having been described as the psychological drama with elements of satire and featuring fragments written as if they were pieces of prose. Also, the play's storyline echoed those of the Christmas tale "Young Heroine" (Маленькая героиня) by the children's author Alexander Fyodorov-Davydov, as well as, to some extent, Netochka Nezvanova by Fyodor Dostoyevsky, both featuring a 'strong schoolgirl' who arrives into the adult world to bring to it radical change.

== Plot summary ==
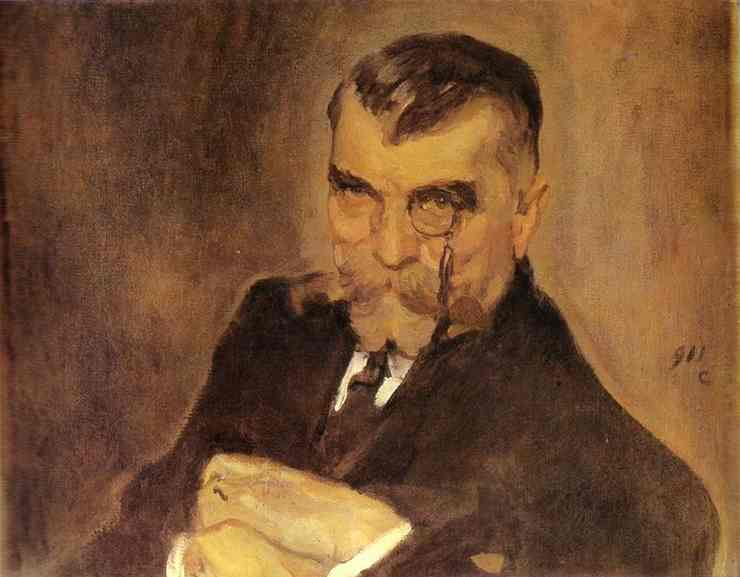
Uncle Mika in MAT was played by Alexey Stakhovich (portrayed here by Valentin Serov), a former army general, much admired by both Stanislavski and the young generation of actors. Outraged by the 1917 Bolshevik coup, he hanged himself in 1919. "He was followed to his last resort mostly by youngsters, and among them were the young members of the Second Studio, his very own Green Ring," Marina Tsvetayeva wrote in a piece called "The Death of Stakhovich".

Finochka, an emotionally disturbed 16-year-old expelled from a gymnasium for violent behaviour, lives in Saratov with Elena Ivanovna, her neurasthenic mother, slowly recuperating after a botched suicide attempt.

She arrives at Moscow (with her mother who needs medical treatment) and visits her father Vozhzhin in his place which he shares with a middle-aged journalist friend Uncle Mika. The latter has no place of his own, "has lost interest in life" and now seeks solace in co-hosting a circle of schoolchildren, friends of Seryozha (the son of Vozhzhin's female partner Anna Dmitriyevna who lives next door) and his own niece Rusya, calling themselves The Green Ring. Finochka arranges for her parents' meeting, Vozhzhin is determined now that the girl should live with him.

Finochka, shaken by the scandal given her by jealous Elena Ivanovna who hates the idea of being left alone (and whose 'suicide' now appears to be more like a 'botched fake', intended to draw sympathy from her ex-husband) is eagerly accepted by the Ring. Its members are now keen to help out of the domestic hell the girl who is now in such a bad way that she steals her mother's revolver, even if still being unsure, apparently, as to how she's going to use it. More distress is caused when Vozhzhin tells Anna Dmitriyevna that he is through with her, while the girl is shocked to learn that her father has a lover who lives next door.

Finally, the Ring hits upon a radical solution for Finochka's troubles: she is to enter the marriage of convenience with Uncle Mika, her father's flatmate. This way she will be able to stay with her dad, attend regularly the meetings of the Green Ring (which she's turned dependent on, too) and bring her own mother in too, so that she won't be left alone.

Uncle Mika, slowly succumbing to his young friends' scheme, is torn by conflicting emotions. Marveling at how his teenage friends have decided his fate for him, he still wonders if this new generation of 'idealists' whom he'd been doting on (and always expressed his desire to be 'useful' to), haven't turned a bit too pragmatic for his liking, by inventing for him such a peculiar 'use'.

== Characters ==
- Uncle Mika, Mikhail Arsenyevich Yasvein, a journalist, known among his young friends as "the man who lost all interest in life"
- Hyppolit Vasilyevich Vozhzhin, an engineer, Uncle Mika's friend and flatmate
- Elena Ivanovna, Vozhzhin' ex-wife
- Anna Dmitriyevna Lebedeva, Vozhzhin's close friend, living next door
- Seryozha, her son, the gymnasium student
- Finochka (Fina, Sofina), the daughter of Vozhzhin and Elena Ivanovna, who lives with her mother in Saratov
- Rusya, the gymnasium student, Uncle Mika's niece
- Nike, her brother
- Valeryan, Petya, Lida, Vera, Andrey and several others, the members of the Green Ring
- Mathylda and Marfusha, women servants

== Production history ==
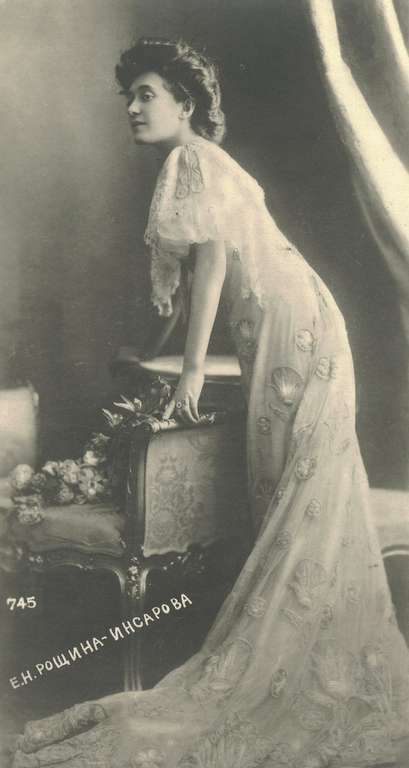
In Alexandrinka the 16-year-old Finochka was played by the 32-year-old Ekaterina Roschina-Insarova.

The play premiered at the Alexandrinsky Theatre on 18 February 1915, directed by Vsevolod Meyerkhold. The premiere, according to Gippius, was "nothing out of the ordinary. Some were raving with delight, others spat hatred, and the press got berserk. Gippius, Meyerhold, Savina! - what's not to get mad over, especially when the censorship is so fierce, there is little else to write about?.. Savina played of course her own heroine, not mine, but did it brilliantly." The author (like many reviewers) noted the extraordinary Second Act with its masterfully staged 'youth assembly'.

According to Arzamastseva, a host of hidden conflicts and undercurrents marked this rather troubled Alexandrinka production. The part of the 16-year-old Finochka was somewhat inexplicably given to Alexandrinka's second prima, Ekaterina Roshchina-Insarova, who was 32 at the time. It was her interpretation of the part, bearing strong resemblance to Savina's 1880s Verochka from A Month in the Country, that upset the critics most, who hated the "horrid theatricality" of some scenes.

Savina was a renown actress in Russian theatre during the late 19th and early 20th centuries, and was also the legendary 'Turgenev's last true love'. She was known for her personal connection to Ivan Turgenev and attempted to join Konstantin Stanislavski's Moscow Art Theatre (MAT) during the 1900s, making much of her 'Turgenev connection'. Her having the Elena Ivanovna's part in the Alexandrinka's production promised to become a statement of defiance and provide the final chord to her artistic career. Indeed, this happened to become the final part for the actress, who died in November 1915.

Gippius too, apparently, had her own old 'unsettled scores' with Stanislavki in mind. In 1904, as Anton Krainy, she panned both Alexandrinka and Moscow Art Theatre for what she saw as their 'overdramatized' attitude towards Russian classics. She chose the Stanislavski-directed Cherry Orchard as an example, concentrating on this play's young characters. The Green Ring for Gippius looked like an attempt to finally implement her own views on how the new generation of young people should be portrayed on stage. "In this respect Finochka looks like the lost child of Chekhov's last dysfunctional loafers, a daughter of 'the eternal student' and the degraded landlady [Ranevskaya]," the critic argued.

This, as well as a host of smaller matters, gave the press a lot to insinuate about. More ominous and significant, bearing in mind the political context, was the 'German factor'. In the days when another wave of anti-decadence campaign (and Gippius's reputation of a 'decadent' lingered on) coincided with the wave of jingoistic feelings, with calls being given in the press to throw all ethnic Germans out of Russia, the play by Gippius (who was half-German) looked close to Wedekind's Spring Awakening which Meyerhold (another German) directed in 1907. The attacks from the 'patriotic' camp continued throughout the play's run in Alexandrinka. The final straw was provided by the article in Novoye Vremya by Viktor Burenin who, while ignoring the play as such, launched a personal attack on the Merezhkovskys and Filosofov. After that the play was performed only once, on 22 April.

In her Afterword to the 1916 Ogni edition Gippius described The Green Ring as a "dream play", consciously 'underwritten' so as to provide little more than guidelines "for actors yet unborn..." According to the author, "Meyerhold totally understood [this], while Savina perceived the play as nothing more than a chance to grab this precious part and create another beautiful character to add to her gallery." In Alexandrinka, the director failed to build anything 'revolutionary' out of this material. Instead, it flourished in the Moscow Art Theatre's Second Studio production, where the directors and young cast used its sparseness to the full extent, according to the (then) art critic Lev Vygotsky.

=== The Green Ring in Moscow Art Theatre ===
On 7 December 1916 The Moscow Art Theatre Second Studio opened with the premiere of The Green Ring, directed by Vakhtang Mchedelov (Stanislavki conducting several final rehearsals), featuring Alexey Stakhovich as Uncle Mika, Alla Tarasova as Finochka, Sofia Holliday as Zoya, Nikolai Batalov as Petya, and Nina Litovtseva as Elena Ivanovna, among others.

The inclusion of it in the repertoire was itself a controversial decision, for the material differed radically from two other children's play that it had, Firebird and Tom Sawyer. The Mchedelov-directed project in which all the teenagers' parts were to be played by real teenagers, looked from the start like a doomed affair. All the more astounding was its enormous success.

The Second Studio premiere was a triumph, according to the actor and the Studio administrator Vsevolod Verbitsky. "The public for five minutes was calling for the director, but [Mchedelov], being an extremely shy man, preferred to hide away," he remembered.

Central to the history of this production was the inspired performance given by the 18-year old Alla Tarasova, whose choice for the role of Finochka, the emotionally troubled heroine, proved to be a contentious issue right from the start. Greatly disappointed with it was, for one, Nina Litovtseva, who played the girl's mother. Giving credit to the young Tarasova as being an undeniably gifted actress, she still deemed her unattractive and cold, wanting in charisma, something that many 'charmful' young actresses of the Second Studio had in abundance.

She confided her doubts to Alexey Stakhovich, cast in the role of Uncle Mika, who in turn got much distressed, by the fellow veteran's failure to see how perfectly the angular 'ugly duckling' fitted into the role. Indeed, Finochka had to be a 'perfect androgyn', in equal parts childish, womanly and masculine, full of well-balanced inner strength. Tarasova was exactly that," argued Arzamastseva.

Tarasova's performance, lauded by the critics, kickstarted what has been described as 'The Finochka Cult' in Moscow. "Never in my life have I seen such an embodiment of clarity, serenity and chastity on stage. Her quiet grey eyes looked straight into the soul of mine. And that was not just myself: hundreds, then thousands of people rushed to MAT to see her on stage and soon it seemed as if the whole Moscow has fell under the spell of Tarasova's Finochka," the theatre critic Vadim Shverubovich remembered.

The Green Ring ran in the Moscow Art Theatre up until 1922, which was in itself remarkable, considering that Stakhovich had committed suicide, outraged by the atrocities of the new regime, and the Merezhkovskys left the country in December 1919 to become extremely harsh critics of the Bolsheviks. Gippius later expressed great regret with the fact that she failed to see the production which, she knew from many people who wrote to her "something quite outstanding." "There it was a completely different matter, for the real 17-year-old teenagers were engaged in it... We were sent photographs, invitations to their 100th run but how could we, in times like those?" she wrote in her memoirs.

The Green Ring was revived on stage in 1933 in Warsaw, Prague, and Paris. In the Mchedelov-directed production in Paris, several actors who had previously portrayed teenage characters took on adult roles, including Vera Grech, who had earlier played a schoolgirl and later portrayed Elena Ivanovna, the character's mother.

== Critical reception ==
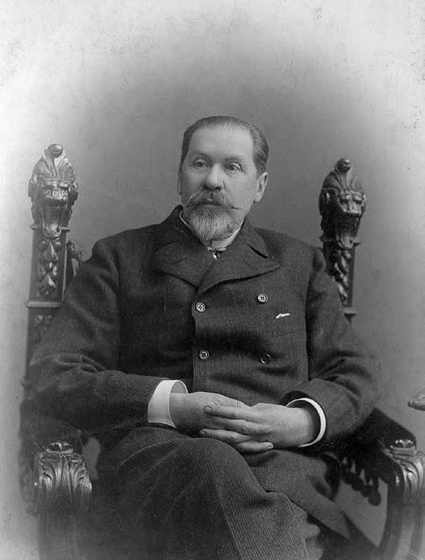
It was Viktor Burenin's vicious attack upon the Green Ring that buried the Alaxandrinka production in 1915.

The play divided the critics the majority of whom left negative reviews, although later, in retrospect, it received a more sympathetic treatment. This had been predicted by Dmitry Merezhkovsky who, writing for the 1 March 1915 issue of Birzhevye Vedomosti (Stockbroker's News) suggested that "the opinions will be polarized due not to the generations' divide portrayed in the play, but rather the schism that exists in the public and among the so-called critics."

Alexey Gvozdev criticized the author's "cold, strictly intellectual approach to life, which freezes the thought lifeless in abstract schemes," and "the false joys of optimistic hope for 'happy Renaissance'," – the drawbacks which in his opinion "stifled even the possibility of there being created in it some lively characters." A. Lyubimov in Nashi Dni called the play "faulty, dull and talentless," while A. Chebotaryova described it as "mawkish, preposterous and tendentious."

Nikolai Asheshov in the March 1915 issue of Sovremenny Mir called The Green Ring "completely unripe play" while Viktor Burenin expressed his attitude towards the production by calling his Novoye Vremya review "The Triumph of Failure" (Торжество провала).

Lyubov Gurevich (in Retch) while giving the author some credit for championing the notions of personal freedom and 'lenience’, as well as "having faith in the unity of the people," considered the play 'schematic' and 'tendentious'. This, in her opinion, prevented Meyerhold from "making the action look as real and simple as, apparently, the author might have wished to see it." The similar view was expressed by Elena Koltonovskaya who noted that the play, "written by a gifted and intelligent author," was still 'concocted', 'arty' and far removed from reality.

Another Retch-published review praised the play for "addressing the future" while "digging deep into the issues of today". Signed D.F., it obviously belonged to Dmitry Filosofov, a close friend of the Merezhkovskys. Both sympathetic and optimistic was the review by the young Nikolai Slonimsky who expressed his delight with the way The Green Ring totally succeeded both in "highlighting all the most urgent questions" and "suggesting the new, exciting answers, providing the material for endless discussions."

Several reviewers, including Gurevich, noted the way Meyerhold had for once abandoned his experimentations and, by trying to totally serve the purpose of the play, has probably saved the production from being the utter disaster. The second act with its impressive scene of the whole of the Green Ring meeting, masterfully staged by the director, has been seen by many as the centerpiece of the production at the Alexandrinka.

Writing for Gorky's Letopis in February 1917 Lev Vygotsky (the future renowned psychologist, then a theatre critic) made much of the text's sparseness which enabled the cast to create the masterpiece of their own out of it. "The play, totally non-engaging in itself, enjoys total re-birth in theatre... turning into something quite captivating. Somehow all its weaknesses disappear, the author's personality vanishes, and all the things 'underwritten' and only sketched get a new life on stage... In through those holes left by the author unfilled, the actors bring in each something of their own." The critic described the production as the great victory of the Second Studio over "this stiltedness that has become common for all children's parts in theatre... The major secret of the [actual] Green Ring, according to the author, is the 'joy of togetherness', and that is exactly what the secret of this whole production turned out to be," the critic asserted.

Georgy Chulkov, writing in 1922, praised the play (which he called 'bizarre') as highly exiting and original, "defying aesthetic characterizations." He found the charm of the play in its "overwhelming sense of direction," with "the author's soul engaged in a flight." "[Gippius's] disgust with the [modern forms] of 'marriage and famuily' is so sheer and intense in The Green Ring, there's almost something monastic about it," he opined, going so far as to interpret it as a true implementation of the "be like children" testament.

While the contemporary critics' reaction was in many ways determined by the political climate in Russia at the time, more recent reviewers approached it bearing a broader social and artistic context in mind. According to Temira Pachmus, "The central idea and the secret of The Green Ring is the joy of the social instinct." The Russian literary historian Irina Arzamastseva analyzed the play in the context of her own concept of "Three ages of a Russian Schoolgirl" (that was how she called her essay), trying to trace the development of a Russian woman from the Turgenev type of the 1840 ('pure', naive and courageous), through the emancipated, art-loving lady (the actress Maria Savina as an epitome), to the early 20th century's 'a girl with a revolver'.
