= Elena Muratova (actress) =

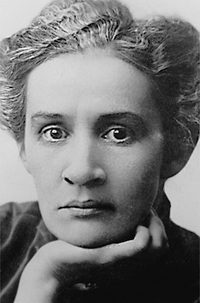
- Born: Elena Pavlovna Muratova; Елена Павловна Муратова; 18 January 1874; Moscow, Russian Empire
- Died: 1 May 1921 (aged 47); Moscow, Soviet Russia
- Occupations: stage actress, reader in drama

Elena Pavlovna Muratova (Russian: Елена Павловна Муратова; 18 January 1874 – 1 May 1921) was a Moscow-born stage actress and reader in drama, associated with the Moscow Art Theatre which she joined in 1901 and stayed with for the rest of her life. She was the first performer of the parts of Akulina Ivanovna (The Philistines, by Gorky), Vasilissa (The Lower Depths), Charlotte (The Cherry Orchard) and Lizaveta Bogdanovna (A Month in the Country).

Muratova was a respected and much admired pedagogue. "Her most popular parts were those of the governesses and it so happened the Elena Pavlovna's parallel life in theatre centered around tutoring young generations of the MAT actors," according to Vasily Luzhsky.

On her deathbed in 1921, she repeatedly begged, "If only I could have an orange ... only one little orange".
