= Nikolai Podgorny (actor) =

Soviet actor (1879–1947)

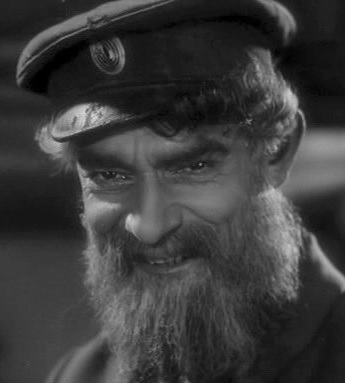
- As Melekhov in And Quiet Flows the Don, 1930
- Born: Nikolai Afanasyevich Podgorny; Николай Афанасьевич Подгорный; 10 December 1879; Moscow, Russian Empire
- Died: 2 August 1947 (aged 67); Moscow, Soviet Union
- Occupations: stage actor, reader in drama

Nikolai Afanasyevich Podgorny (Russian: Николай Афанасьевич Подгорный, 10 December 1879 — 2 August 1947) was a Moscow-born Russian, Soviet actor and later reader in drama, associated with the Moscow Art Theatre.

== Career ==
A 1903 MAT School graduate, Podgorny joined the troupe the same year. Among his acclaimed works here were Baron Tuzenbakh (Three Sisters by Anton Chekhov, in which he also played Fedotik, and later Ferapont), Medvedenko (The Seagull by Chekhov), Petya Trofimov (The Cherry Orchard, in which he succeeded Vasily Kachalov), Molchalin (Woe from Wit, by Alexander Griboyedov) and the pauper Tyu in The Drama of Life by Knut Hamsun ("My horrid, stylized, wonderful Tyu," Olga Knipper, his partner in this production, addressed him in a letter).

In 1913, alongside Nikolai Alexandrov and Nikolai Massalitinov he co-founded the private Drama School, known popularly as the "School of the Three Nikolais", which in 1916 formed the basis for the MAT Second Studio.

In 1919, at the height of the Russian Civil War, Podgorny, then a member part of the Kachalov Troupe, found himself stranded in Europe. Taking enormous risks, he, on his own, managed to cross several frontlines and miraculously make it to Moscow.

In 1920s and early 1930s he was the MAT's Repertoire department director and, arguably, the most influential figure in the theatre after Stanislavski himself. Podgorny appeared in five Soviet films, including And Quiet Flows the Don (Тихий Дон, 1930, silent; 1933, sound version; as Panteleymon Melekhov) and Dead House (Мёртвый дом, as Konstantin Pobedonostsev). Podgorny was honoured with the titles the Meritorious Artist of the Republic (1928) and the Meritorious Practitioner of Arts of the RSFSR (1938).
