= Madame de La Pommeraye's Intrigues =

1922 film directed by Fritz Wendhausen

- Directed by: Fritz Wendhausen
- Written by: Denis Diderot (story); Paul Beyer; Fritz Wendhausen
- Produced by: Erich Pommer
- Starring: Olga Gzovskaya; Margarete Schlegel; Grete Berger; Alfred Abel
- Cinematography: Carl Hoffmann
- Production companies: Russo Film; Decla-Bioscop
- Distributed by: UFA
- Release date: 20 January 1922
- Country: Germany
- Languages: Silent; German intertitles

Madame de La Pommeraye's Intrigues (German: Die Intrigen der Madame de La Pommeraye) is a 1922 German silent film directed by Fritz Wendhausen and starring Olga Gsowskaja, Margarete Schlegel and Grete Berger. The film was produced by Russo Film, a short-lived company backed by Decla-Bioscop which aimed to adapt literary works for the screen. The film was released shortly after Decla-Bioscop had been absorbed into the larger UFA group. It was based on a story by Denis Diderot. It premiered at the Tauentzienpalast on 20 January 1922.

== Cast ==
- Olga Gzovskaya as Madame Pommeraye
- Margarete Schlegel as Jeanette d'Aisnon
- Grete Berger as Madame d'Aisnon – Her Mother
- Alfred Abel
- Paul Hartmann

== Bibliography ==
- Hardt, Ursula. From Caligari to California: Erich Pommer's life in the International Film Wars. Berghahn Books, 1996.
