= A Month in the Country (play) =

Play by Ivan Turgenev

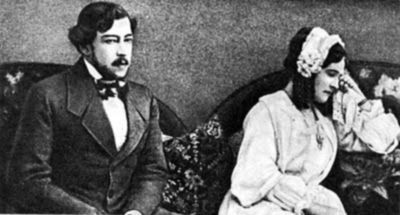
- Konstantin Stanislavski (left) and Olga Knipper (right) as Rakitin and Natalya in the Moscow Art Theatre's production in 1909
- Original language: Russian
- Written by: Ivan Turgenev
- Characters: Natalya Petrovna; Mikhail Rakitin; Aleksei Belyaev; Vera; Shpigelsky; Arkadi Islaev; Lizaveta Bogdanovna; Bolshintsov; Schaaf; Anna Semenovna; Kolya; Katya; Matvei
- Genre: Comedy
- Setting: The Islaev country estate in the 1840s

Premiere
- Date: 1872

A Month in the Country (Russian: Месяц в деревне, romanized: Mesiats v derevne) is a play in five acts by Ivan Turgenev, his only well-known work for the theatre. Originally titled The Student, it was written in France between 1848 and 1850 and first published in 1855 as Two Women. The play was not staged until 1872, when it was given as A Month in the Country at a benefit performance for the Moscow actress Ekaterina Vasilyeva (1829–1877), who was keen to play the leading role of Natalya Petrovna.

== Background ==
Originally entitled The Student, the play was banned by the Saint Petersburg censor without being performed. Turgenev changed the title to Two Women. In 1854 it was passed for publication, provided alterations were made — demands made more on moral than political grounds. To play down the controversy, Turgenev finally settled on the name A Month in the Country.

In the introduction to his 1994 English translation, Richard Freeborn wrote:

Turgenev's comedy has often been called Chekhovian, even though it preceded Chekhov's mature work by more than forty years. The happiest irony surrounding the play's survival is that its ultimate success was due more than anything to the popularity of Chekhov's work and the kind of ensemble playing which Stanislavsky fostered at the Moscow Art Theatre. It was his production in 1909, when he played the role of Rakitin, that finally demonstrated the true brilliance of Turgenev's long-neglected play.

== Plot summary ==
The setting is the Islaev country estate in the 1840s. Natalya Petrovna, a headstrong 29-year-old, is married to Arkadi Islaev, a rich landowner seven years her senior. Bored with life, she welcomes the attentions of Mikhail Rakitin as her devoted but resentful admirer, without ever letting their friendship develop into a love affair.

The arrival of the handsome 21-year-old student Aleksei Belyaev as tutor to her son Kolya ends her boredom. Natalya falls in love with Aleksei, but so does her ward Vera, the Islaevs' 17-year-old foster daughter. To rid herself of her rival, Natalya proposes that Vera should marry a rich old neighbour, but the rivalry remains unresolved.

Rakitin struggles with his love for Natalya, and she wrestles with hers for Aleksei, while Vera and Aleksei draw closer. Misunderstandings arise, and when Arkadi begins to have his suspicions, both Rakitin and Aleksei are obliged to leave. As other members of the household drift off to their own worlds, Natalya's life returns to a state of boredom.

== Characters ==
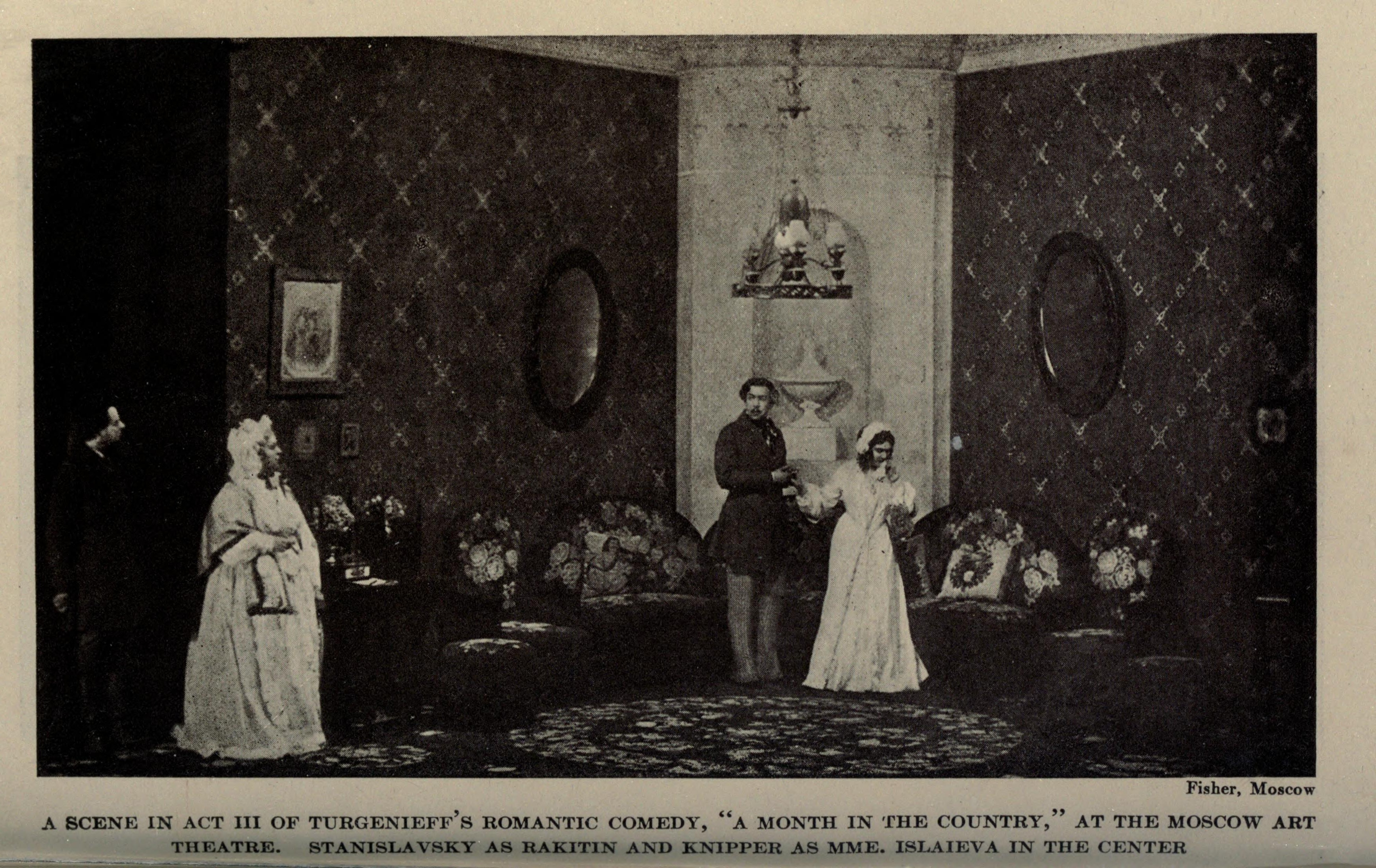
Islayev (Nikolai Massalitinov, left) and his mother Anna (Maria Samarova) surprise his wife Natalya (Olga Knipper, centre) and her would-be lover and friend of the family Rakitin (Konstantin Stanislavski), in Act 3 of the MAT production (1909).

- Natalya Petrovna, wife of a rich landowner, 29
- Mikhail Aleksandrovich Rakitin, a family friend, in love with Natalya, 30
- Aleksei Nikolayevich Belyaev, a new young tutor of Natalya's son Kolya, 21
- Arkadi Sergeyevich Islayev, a rich landowner, husband of Natalya, 36
- Kolya, son of Natalya and Islayev, 10
- Vera Aleksandrovna (Verochka), Natalya's ward, 17
- Anna Semyonovna Islayeva, Arkadi's mother, 58
- Lizaveta Bogdanovna, a companion, 37
- Adam Ivanovich Schaaf, a German tutor, 45
- Afanasi Ivanovich Bolshintsov, a neighbour, 48
- Ignati Ilyich Shpigelsky, a doctor, 40
- Matvei, a servant, 40
- Katya, a servant, 20

== Acts ==
Act 1: The Drawing Room, afternoon

Act 2: The Garden, the following day

Act 3: The Drawing Room, the following day

Act 4: The Estate, the same evening

Act 5: The Veranda, the following day

== Production history ==
=== Russian productions ===
After its 1872 premiere, A Month in the Country was not performed again until 1879, when it became a regular part of the Russian repertoire.

The Moscow Art Theatre (MAT) production opened on 22 December [O.S. 9 December] 1909. It was directed by Konstantin Stanislavski (who alternated the role of Rakitin with Vasili Kachalov) and Ivan Moskvin. Olga Knipper played Natalya, Nikolai Massalitinov was her husband, Islayev, and Maria Samarova his mother, Anna. Richard Boleslavsky played Belyaev, with Lydia Koreneva as Verochka. The rest of the cast included Elena Muratova as Lizaveta, Nikolai Zvantsev as Schaaf, Ilya Uralov as Bolshintsov, Vladimir Gribunin as Shpigelsky, I. V. Lazarev as Matvei, and Lyubov Dmitrevskaya as Katya. Scenic design was by the World of Art artist Mstislav Dobuzhinsky. This was the first production in which Stanislavski made use of his emerging 'system' of acting, much to the general distress of the actors, and Knipper in particular.

=== American productions ===
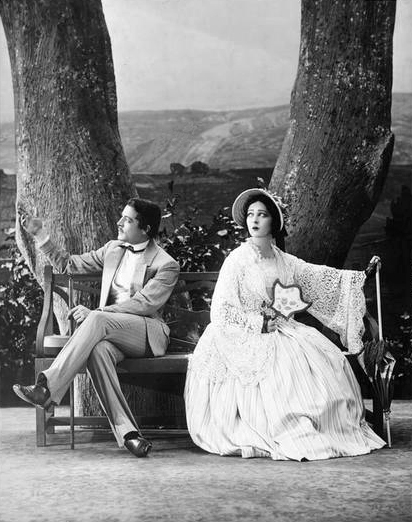
Elliot Cabot and Alla Nazimova in the Theatre Guild production (1930)

- Eltinge 42nd Street Theatre, New York, March 1930, directed by Rouben Mamoulian, starring Alla Nazimova and Elliot Cabot
- The Phoenix Theatre, New York, April, 1956, Directed by Michael Redgrave, starring Albert David Hedison as accompanied by Mike Danzi and John Serry (Theatre World Award,1956)
- Roundabout Theatre Company New York City, 1979, directed by Michael Kahn, starring Tammy Grimes, Amanda Plummer and Thor Fields
- Criterion Center Stage Right, New York, April 1995, directed by Scott Ellis, starring Helen Mirren (Tony nominee, 1995 Theatre World Award) and Ron Rifkin
- Arena Stage, Washington, May 1995, adapted by Brian Friel and directed by Kyle Donnelly, starring Mary Beth Peil and Joseph Fuqua
- The Classic Stage Company, New York, January 2015, directed by Erica Schmidt, starring Taylor Schilling, Peter Dinklage and Annabella Sciorra

=== European productions ===
- St James's Theatre London, February 1943, adapted and directed by Emlyn Williams, starring Michael Redgrave and Valerie Taylor
- New Theatre London, November 1949, directed by Michel Saint-Denis for the Old Vic Company at the New, starring Michael Redgrave and Angela Baddeley
- Yvonne Arnaud Theatre, Guildford, May 1965, and Cambridge Theatre London, September 1965, directed by Michael Redgrave, starring Ingrid Bergman and Michael Redgrave, and featuring Fay Compton, Jeremy Brett, Emlyn Williams, Peter Pratt and Joanna Dunham
- Albery Theatre London, November 1975, by the Prospect Theatre Company, directed by Toby Robertson, starring Dorothy Tutin, Derek Jacobi and Gary Russell
- National Theatre (Olivier), London, February 1981, translated by Isaiah Berlin, directed by Peter Gill, starring Francesca Annis and Nigel Terry
- Abbey Theatre Dublin, 1992, in a version by Brian Friel; revived by the RSC at the Swan in Stratford-upon-Avon, December 1998, directed by Michael Attenborough, and at The Pit in London, May 1999
- Albery Theatre London, March 1994; directed by Bill Bryden, starring Helen Mirren and John Hurt with Joseph Fiennes as Belyaev
- National Theatre (Lyttelton auditorium), London, 28 July - 21 October 2015, in a version entitled Three Days in the Country written and directed by Patrick Marber, with John Simm, Mark Gatiss and Amanda Drew
- Théâtre du Nord-Ouest in Paris, March 2019, adapted and directed by Bernard Lefebvre, starring Bernard Lefebvre, Olivier Bruaux and Hélène Robin
- Donmar Warehouse London, 22 August – 3 October 2026, in the Brian Friel version, directed by Lyndsey Turner, starring Sophie Okonedo as Natalya Petrovna, with Alistair Petrie as Rakitin, Patrick Gibson as Belyaev, Daniel Rigby as Shpigelsky, Susan Brown, Mark Hadfield and Rachelle Diedericks

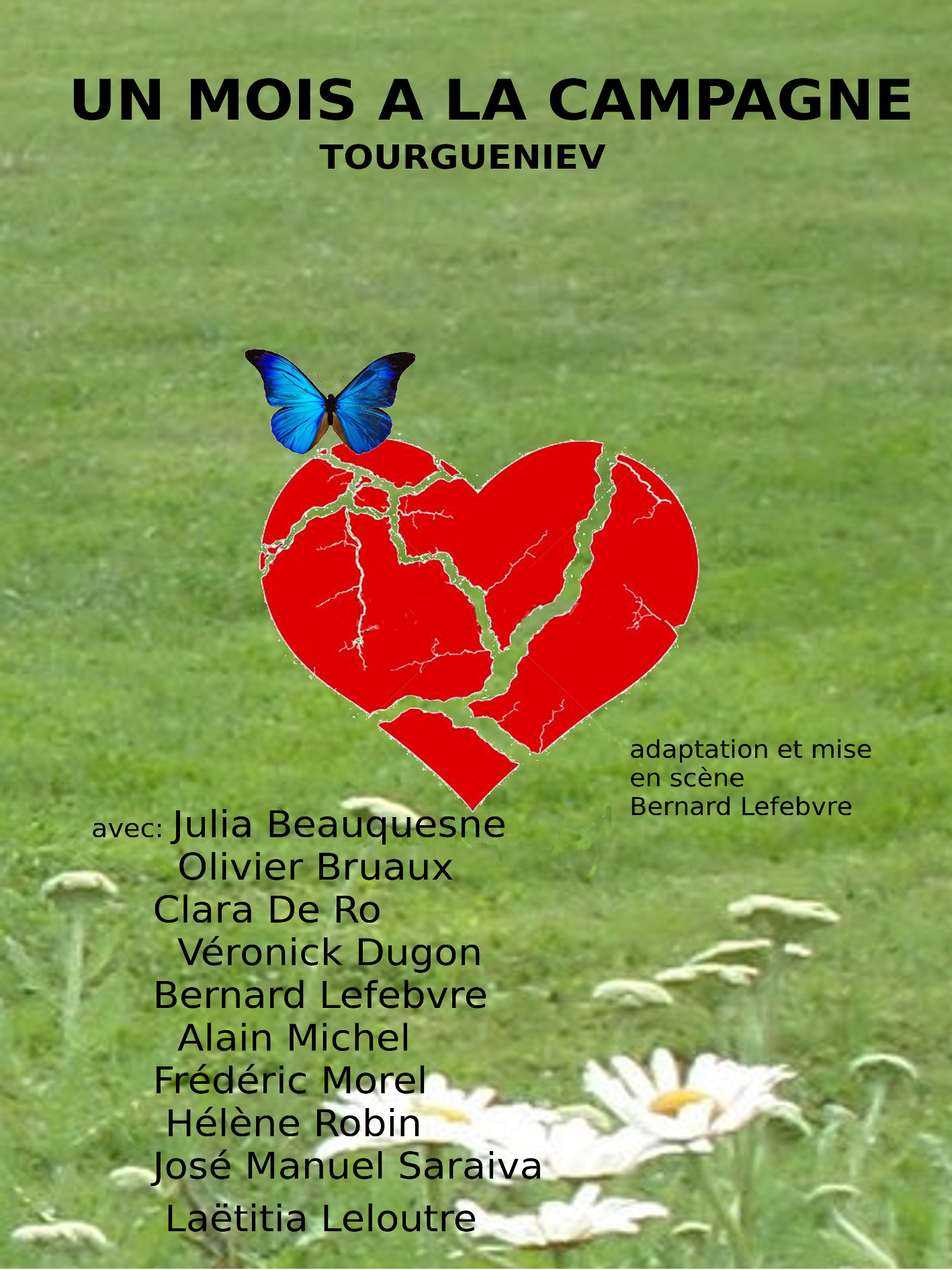
French poster Un mois à la campagne directed by Bernard Lefebvre in Paris

== Adaptations ==
=== Films ===
European film adaptations of A Month in the Country include:

- Secrets, a 1943 French adaptation directed by Pierre Blanchar
- Two Women (Две женщины), a 2014 Russian film directed by Vera Glagoleva featuring Sylvie Testud and Ralph Fiennes

A Month in the Country has been adapted into English several times as made-for-television films. These include productions in:

- 1955, with Margaret Leighton (Natalya), Laurence Harvey (Belyaev), and Michael Gough (Rakitin)
- 1959, with Uta Hagen (Natalya), Richard Easton (Belyaev), and Alexander Scourby (Rakitin)
- 1966, with Vivien Merchant (Natalya), Hywel Bennett (Belyaev), and Derek Godfrey (Rakitin)
- 1967, with Susannah York (Natalya), Ian McShane (Belyaev), and Michael Wells (Rakitin)
- 1985, with Eleanor Bron (Natalya), Shaun Scott (Belyaev), and Ian Charleson (Rakitin)

=== Ballet ===
Turgenev's play was freely adapted by choreographer Frederick Ashton as a one-act ballet of the same name for the Royal Ballet company in 1976. John Lanchbery arranged the score based on music by Frédéric Chopin; the stage design was by Julia Trevelyan Oman. Natalia was first danced by Lynn Seymour, for whom the role was created, and Anthony Dowell danced the role of Belyaev. For research purposes, Frederick Ashton took Lynn Seymour and the rest of the ballet cast to see the London production of the play, with Dorothy Tutin in the lead.

The premiere ballet performance was presented at the Royal Opera House, Covent Garden, on 12 February 1976, and the production was filmed that year by director Colin Nears for the BBC. Lynn Seymour also danced the role in New York.

=== Opera ===
Lee Hoiby composed a two-act opera based on the play. Originally titled Natalia Petrovna, it was premiered in 1964 at New York City Opera. It was revised as A Month in the Country; this form was premiered in Boston in 1981, and has since been recorded.

== Sources ==
- Benedetti, Jean. 1999. Stanislavski: His Life and Art. Revised edition. Original edition published in 1988. London: Methuen. ISBN 0-413-52520-1.
- Berlin, Isaiah, trans. 1981. A Month in the Country. By Ivan Turgenev. London: Penguin. ISBN 0-14-044436-X.
- Kavanagh, Julie. 1996. Secret Muses: The Life of Frederick Ashton. London: Faber. ISBN 0-571-14352-0.
- Patterson, Michael, ed. 2005. The Oxford Dictionary of Plays. Oxford: Oxford UP. ISBN 0-19-860417-3.
- Tanitch, Robert. 2007. London Stage in the 20th Century London: Haus. ISBN 978-1-904950-74-5.
- Theatre Record and its annual Indexes.
- Worrall, Nick. 1996. The Moscow Art Theatre. Theatre Production Studies ser. London and NY: Routledge. ISBN 0-415-05598-9.
