= Ilya Uralov =

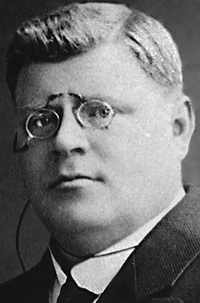
- Born: Ilya Matveyevich Konkov; Илья Матвеевич Коньков; 1872; Orsk, Orenburg Governorate, Russian Empire
- Died: October 16, 1920 (aged 48); Novhorod-Siverskyi, Soviet Russia
- Occupation: Stage actor

Ilya Matveyevich Konkov (Russian: Илья Матвеевич Коньков; 1872 – 16 October 1920) was a Russian stage actor better known under his stage name Uralov (Уралов).

== Biography ==
Born in Orsk to the family of Orenburg Cossacks, Konkov spent his youth travelling all over Russia, undertaking menial jobs. While in Ashkhabad, in late 1890s he joined a visiting Ukrainian theatre troupe. In 1904 he was invited to the Komissarzhevskaya Theatre in Saint Petersburg where he made himself a name in plays by Maxim Gorky, in particular, Summerfolk (as Dvoyetochiye, 1904) and Children of the Sun (Chepurnoy, 1905).

In 1907 Ilya Uralov (as he was now known) joined the Moscow Art Theatre where his premiere parts included Varlaam (in Alexander Pushkin's Boris Godunov, 1907), Someone in Grey (The Life of Man, 1907), the Mayor (Revizor, 1908), Bolshintsov (A Month in the Country, Ivan Turgenev, 1909) and Grigory (The Karamazov Brothers, after Dostoyevsky's novel, 1910). In 1911 Uralov left the theatre to join Alexandrinka; Stanislavsky later called MAT's decision to let him go a 'regrettable mistake'.

During his eight years stint with the Alexanrinsky Theatre (which he in 1918 became one of the administrators of), Uralov has made his mark with his "juicy, fulsome realism"; his acclaimed work included Peter the Great (The Assembly by Pyotr Gnedich), Dikoy (The Storm by Alexander Ostrovsky), Varavvin (The Case and Rasplyuyev's Merry Days by Aleksandr Sukhovo-Kobylin), Knurov (Without a Dowry by Ostrovsky), Bessemenov (The Philistines by Gorky), and Skotinin (The Minor by Denis Fonvizin).

Ilya Uralov died in 1920 in Novhorod-Siverskyi, Chernihiv, Ukraine (then Soviet Russia). The Soviet actor Yakov Malyutin left a memoir on Uralov in a book called The Actors of My Generation.
