= Ekaterina Vasilyeva (19th-century actress) =

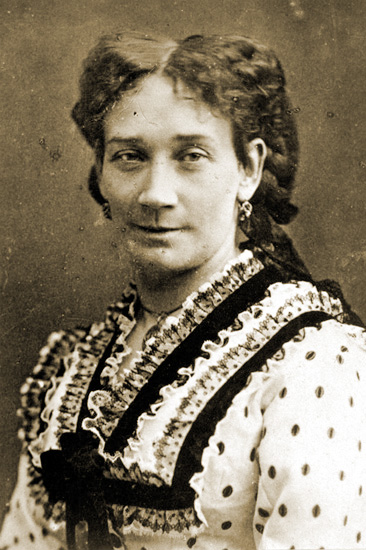
- Born: Екатерина Николаевна Лаврова; 16 August 1829; Moscow, Russian Empire
- Died: 27 April 1877 (aged 47); Bern, Switzerland
- Occupation: Stage actress
- Spouse: Sergey Vasilyev

Ekaterina Nikolayevna Vasilyeva (Russian: Екатерина Николаевна Васильева, née Lavrova (Лаврова), 16 August 1829 in Moscow, Russian Empire – 27 April 1877 in Bern, Switzerland) was a Russian stage actress.

== Biography ==
Born to the professional opera singers, Nikolai Lavrov and Darya Saburova, she debuted in 1845 in the Maly Theatre production of Eugène Scribe's La chanoinesse (translated into Russian as Девица-отшельница, A Maiden Hermit) as Gabriele, and a year later moved to Saint Petersburg where in 1847 she was invited to join the Alexandrinsky Theatre troupe. The 14 October 1863 premiere of Alexander Ostrovsky's A Profitable Position was given as a benefit performance for Vasilyeva. Another famous Maly benefit, the A.F. Bogdanov-directed production of Ivan Turgenev's A Month in a Country on 13 January 1872 celebrated the 25th Anniversary of Vasilyeva's stage career. Ostrovsky considered her to be the best Russian actress to specialize in the contemporary French, notably, Scribe's plays. Ekaterina Vasilyeva died in Bern, Switzerland, where she had been treated for tuberculosis.
