= Bernard Lefebvre =

French photographer (1906–1992)

Bernard Lefebvre (27 March 1906 – 30 November 1992), known as Ellebé, was a French photographer, born in Rouen, Seine-Maritime, France. He was a member of the Rouen Academy, and president of the Rouen Photo-club from 1937 to 1941 and 1951 to 1977.

== Works ==
- Charles Rabot, Croisière arctique, Rouen, 1932. Illustrations by Pierre Le Trividic and photographs by Bernard Lefebvre.
- Conseils aux amateurs qui désirent se documenter par la photographie, Rouen, 1939
- Les Cinématographes de la Saint-Romain de Rouen: 1896-1907, CRDP, Mont-Saint-Aignan, 1982
- Avec de Gaulle en Afrique, ed. Bertout, Luneray, 1990 ISBN 2-86743-110-7

== Bibliography ==
- Le Grand Livre des Rouennais, ed. for P'tit Normand, Rouen, 1983
- Georges Lanfry, La Cathédrale retrouvée, ed. Point de vues, Bonsecours, 2006 ISBN 2-915548-10-2
