= Nikolai Alexandrov (actor) =

Russian actor and theatre director (1870-1930)

- Born: Nikolai Grigoryevich Alexandrov; Николай Григорьевич Александров; 21 December 1870; Moscow, Russian Empire
- Died: 3 November 1930 (aged 59); Moscow, U.S.S.R.
- Occupation: stage actor

Nikolai Grigoryevich Alexandrov (Russian: Николай Григорьевич Александров, 21 December 1870, [new style: January 2, 1871], — 3 November 1930) was a Russian stage actor, theatre director and drama teacher, associated with Moscow Art Theatre.

== Biography ==
Alexandrov was born in Moscow and studied at the Moscow School of Painting, Sculpture and Architecture. He started his career at the Moscow Nemchinov's Theaters in 1887 and in 1896-1898 had a stint with the Society of Art and Literature as a director assistant and actor. In 1898 he joined the Stanislavski troupe, and for the rest of his life worked at the Moscow Art Theater. Among the parts that he was the first performer of, were Yasha (The Cherry Orchard, 1904), Pig (The Blue Bird, 1908), Korobkin (Revizor, 1908), Artemyev (The Living Corpse, 1911). In 1904, together with Stanislavsky, he staged three plays by Maurice Maeterlinck: Uninvited, The Blind and There, Inside.

According to Vladimir Nemirovich-Danchenko, Alexandrov's greatest gift was that of a director's assistant, and as such he "was unequalled probably in the whole history of Russian theatre."

In 1913 Alexandrov became a co-founder (with Nikolai Massalitinov and Nikolai Podgorny) of the private Drama School, also known as "the School of the Three Nikolais" (Школа трёх Николаев), which in 1916 was reformed into the MAT Second Studio. In 1928 Alexandrov was awarded the title Meritorious Artist of RSFSR. He died in Moscow on 3 November 1930.
