= Nina Litovtseva =

Russian actor and theatre director (1878–1956)

- Born: Nina Nikolayevna Levestamm; 12 January 1878; Moscow, Russian Empire
- Died: 8 April 1956 (aged 78); Moscow, Soviet Union
- Occupations: Actress, theater director
- Spouse: Vasily Kachalov

Nina Nikolayevna Levestamm (Russian: Нина Николаевна Левестамм, 12 January 1878 – 8 April 1956) was a Russian and Soviet stage actress, associated with Moscow Art Theatre, known under her stage name Litovtseva (Russian: Литовцева). Actor Vasily Kachalov was her husband.

== Biography ==
After the graduation from the Philharmonic Institute, where she studied under Vladimir Nemirovich-Danchenko, Litovtseva joined the Mikhail Borodai Troupe and for several years worked in the Russian province, mostly in Kazan, Saratov and Astrakhan. In 1900 she married Vasily Kachalov in Kislovodsk, and a year later was invited to join the MAT troupe, soon after he did.

The much sought-after breakthrough never came: during her first three years she appeared only in episodes, even though Nemirovich-Danchenko is known to have rated her artistic potential high. It was only in 1905 that Litovtseva received her first two substantial parts, Vera Pavlovna in Ivan Mironych by Evgeny Chirikov and Fima in Maxim Gorky's Children of the Sun. Quite prepared to leave MAT, she took a one year leave, to join the Konstantin Nezlobin troupe in Riga. It was there that she fell seriously ill, and, having undergone seven operations in five months, ended up with a limp. A period of severe depression followed (at one point she became so close to committing suicide as to buy a revolver), but in 1908 she returned to work as a reader in drama and stage director at the MAT Second studio, where she produced The Green Ring by Zinaida Gippius (1916) and Mladost by Leonid Andreyev (1918).

In 1922, after the Kachalov Group, which she was part of, returned to Moscow having spent three years in Europe, Litovtseva resumed working for the theatre. She directed Nicolas the First and the Decembrists (1926, by Alexander Kugel based on two Dmitry Merezhkovsky novels) and later Armoured Train 14-69 by Vsevolod Ivanov (1927), Our Youth (1930, S. Kartashev's stage adaptation of Viktor Kin's 1928 novel On the Other Side), Talents and Admirers by Alexander Ostrovsky (1933), Three Sisters (1940), Uncle Vanya, 1947, in which she also appeared as Voynitskaya), and The Fruits of Enlightenment (1951).

In 1948 she was honored with the title of People's Artist of the RSFSR. She died on 8 April 1956, in Moscow, and is interred in Novodevichy Cemetery.
