= Vasily Luzhsky =

Russian Soviet stage actor (1869–1931)

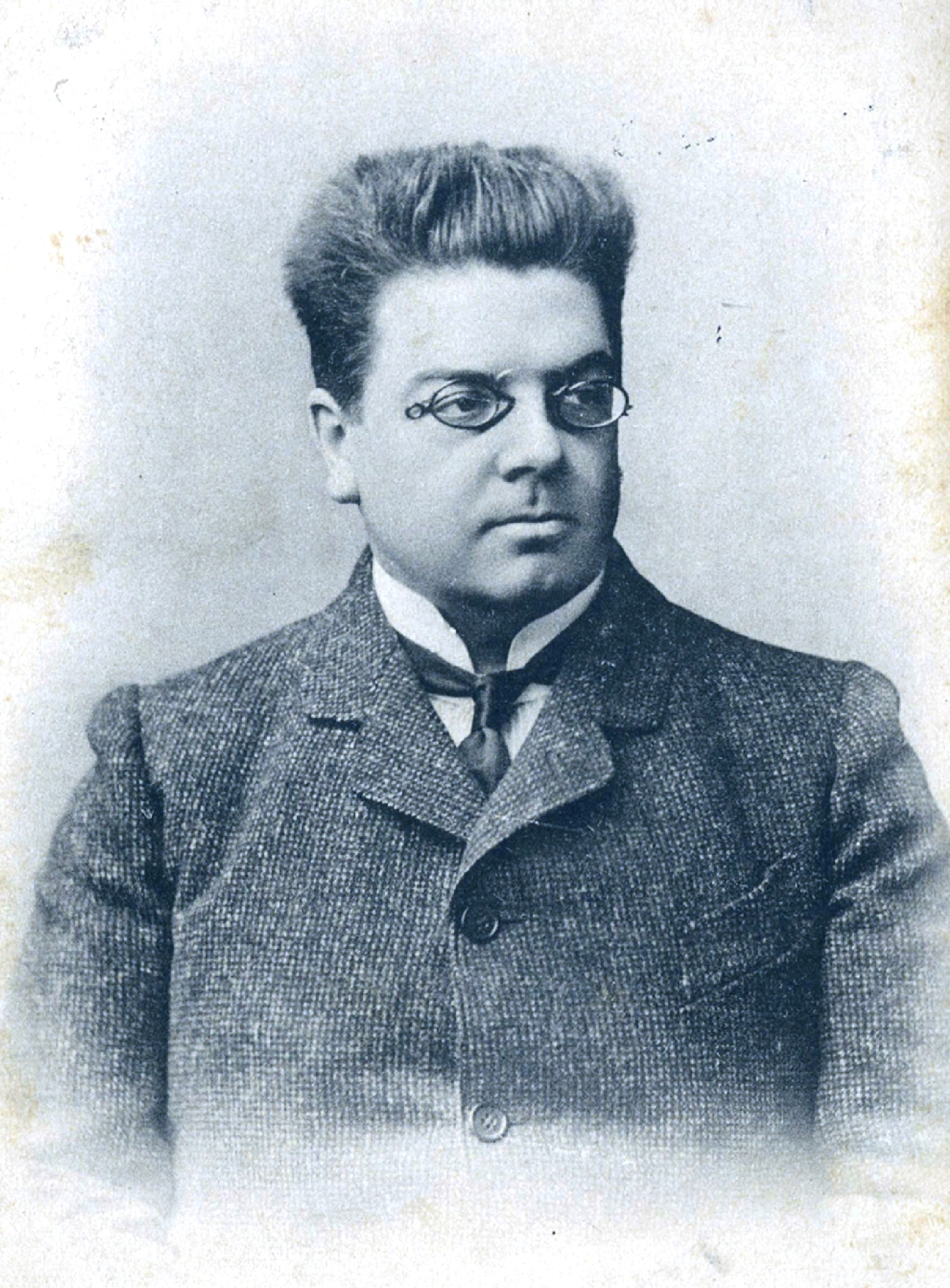
- Born: Василий Васильевич Лужский; 31 December 1869; Shuya, Vladimir Governorate, Russian Empire
- Died: 2 July 1931 (aged 61); Moscow, USSR
- Resting place: Novodevichy Cemetery, Moscow
- Occupations: stage actor, theatre director
- Awards: The Meritorious Artist of RSFSR (1931)

Vasily Vasilyevich Luzhsky (Russian: Василий Васильевич Лужский, born Kaluzhsky, Калужский; 31 December 1869 — 2 July 1931) was a Russian Soviet stage actor and theatre director associated with the Moscow Art Theatre.

== Biography ==
Born in Shuya, Vladimir Governorate, to a merchant family, Kaluzhsky debuted in 1890 on stage the Art and Literature Society, where he played 44 parts, some of which were later repeated in MAT, including that of Sir Toby in Shakespeare's The Twelfth Night. In 1898 he joined Konstantin Stanislavski's original troupe and played Shuisky in the Moscow Art Theatre's very first production, that of Tsar Fyodor Ioannovich by Alexey K. Tolstoy. The same year he played Sorin in what came to be recognized later as the groundbreaking production of Anton Chekhov's The Seagull and soon became the first Russian performer of the part of Prozorov in The Three Sisters.

He was also the first performer of the parts of Serebryakov (Uncle Vanya by Anton Chekhov, 1899), Andrey (The Three Sisters, 1901) Bessemenov (The Philistines by Maxim Gorky, 1902), Bubnov (The Lower Depths by Gorky, 1902), Lebedev (Ivanov, 1904). In all, he had 64 parts in the Moscow Art Theatre and was a co-director of its 23 productions. In the early 1910s Luzhsky read drama at the Alexander Adashev's Drama Courses. He contributed to all the MAT studios, arguably most successfully to Nemirovich-Danchenko-led Music Studio, which also came to be known as the Comic Opera.

Stanislavski who knew Luzhsky from the days of their youth, opined in his memoirs, that it was the "brilliant gift of imitator" that had prevented him from developing into a great actor which he had all the potential to become. He also praised Luzhsky as a great organizer; it was usually at his dacha in Ivankovo that designers and decorators assembled to work upon stage designs. Still, Luzhsky's contribution to the theatre has never been properly credited, according to Stanislavski, and "there was a lot of bitterness left in him which comes through in his diaries which remained unpublished," the theatre historian Inna Solovyova wrote.

Vasily Luzhsky died on 2 July 1931 in Moscow.

== Private life ==
Vasily Luzhsky's wife was Peretta Kaluzhskaya, née Kryukova. Their son Evgeny Kaluzhsky (1866 ? -1966) became a Moscow Art Theatre actor too.
