= Nikolai Massalitinov =

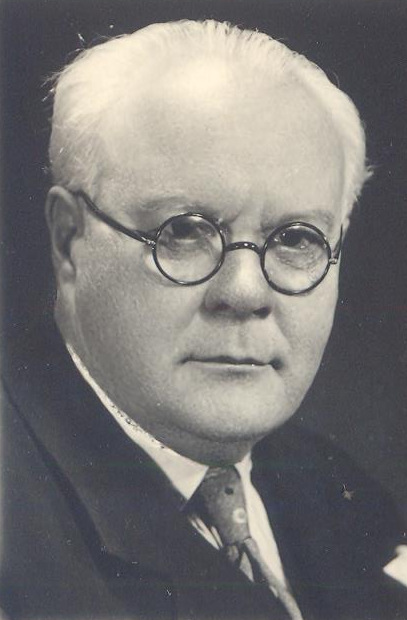
- Massalitinov in 1940
- Born: Nikolai Osipovich Massalitinov; Николай Осипович Массалитинов; 24 February 1880; Yelets, Oryol Governorate, Russian Empire
- Died: 22 March 1961 (aged 81); Sofia, Bulgaria
- Occupations: stage actor, theatre director, pedagogue

Nikolai Osipovich Massalitinov (Russian: Николай Осипович Массалитинов, 24 February 1880, Yelets, Oryol Governorate, Russian Empire, — 22 March 1961, Sofia, Bulgaria) was a Russian (later Bulgarian) stage actor, theatre director and pedagogue, associated originally with the Moscow Art Theatre and, since 1925, with Ivan Vazov National Theatre in Bulgaria. The actress Varvara Massalitinova was his sister.

In 1907 Massalitinov, a Maly Theatre Drama School graduate, was invited, personally by Stanislavski, to join the MAT troupe. In 1913, alongside Nikolai Alexandrov and Nikolai Podgorny he co-founded the private Drama School, the so-called "School of the Three Nikolais", which in 1916 was reformed to become the MAT Second Studio.

In 1919 Massalitinov, as part of the Kachalov Troupe, found himself abroad, cut off from home. Unlike the majority of the actors, he decided against returning to the Bolshevist Russia and first joined the Prague-based, Maria Germanova-led troupe, then in 1925 settled in Bulgaria to become there a respected director and pedagogue, proponent of the Stanislavski method. In 1948 he was designated as a Meritorious Artist of the People's Republic of Bulgaria, and in 1950 won the Dimitrov Prize.

== Filmography ==
Year	Title	Role	Notes
1915	Ekaterina Ivanovna		
1922	Poslední radost	Public Prosecutor	
1924	The Power of Darkness		
1955	Heroes of Shipka	Aleksandr Gorchakov - kantsler	(final film role)
