= Vasily Kachalov =

Russian actor (1875–1948)

- Василий Качалов
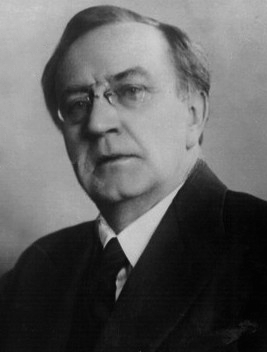
- Kachalov in 1935
- Born: 11 February 1875; Vilna, Russian Empire
- Died: 30 September 1948 (aged 73); Moscow, Russian SFSR, Soviet Union
- Resting place: Mount Auburn Cemetery
- Occupation: Actor

Vasily Ivanovich Kachalov (Russian: Василий Иванович Качалов; 11 February [O.S. 30 January] 1875 – 30 September 1948) was one of Russia's most renowned actors. He worked closely and often with Konstantin Stanislavski. He led the so-called Kachalov Group within the Moscow Art Theatre. It was Kachalov who played Hamlet in the Symbolist production of 1911.

His father was Ivan Shverubovich, a Belarusian Orthodox priest from Vilna. His schoolmates at Vilna Gymnasium included revolutionary Felix Dzerzhinsky and composer Konstantinas Galkauskas. In 1896, he left the law department of Saint Petersburg University in order to pursue an acting career. After four years of touring the Russian provinces and a brief stint at the Suvorin Theatre, Kachalov made his debut at the Moscow Art Theatre as Tsar Berendey in The Snow Maiden (spring 1900).

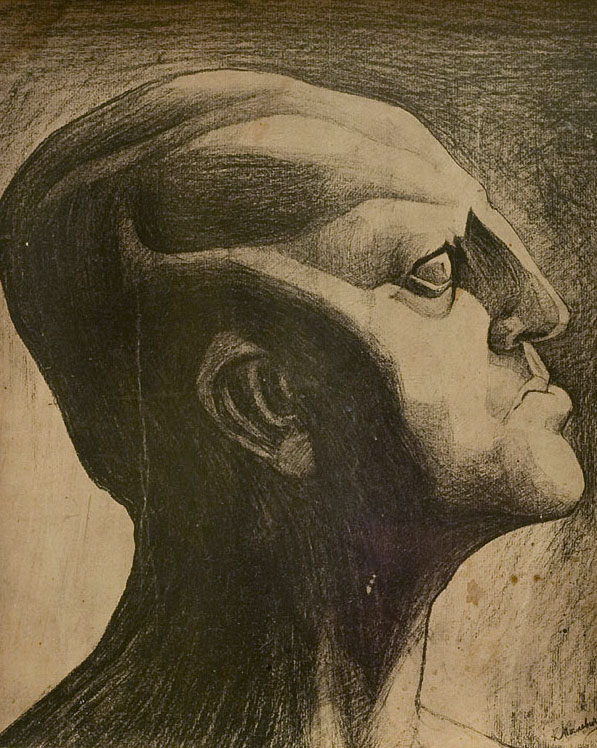
Kachalov's portrait by Kazimir Malevich

The snow maiden was played by Stanislavski's wife, Maria Lilina, who fell in love with Kachalov; she described their affair as "a touch of private happiness". Another of his lovers was Alisa Koonen. He met his wife, actress Nina Litovtseva, when they were acting in the Kazan Drama Theatre, one of Russia's oldest.

Kachalov was greatly admired for his "magnetic" voice. He played Baron Tuzenbach after Vsevolod Meyerhold's departure from the theatre. In the original 1904 production of The Cherry Orchard he appeared as Trofimov. He starred in Vladimir Nemirovich-Danchenko's production of Ivanov later that year. All in all, he took more than 50 roles in Stanislavski's company.

After the Russian Revolution, the Kachalov Group went touring Central Europe and did not return until the summer of 1921, under pressure from the theatre's founders.

Kachalov was named one of the first People's Artists of the USSR after the title was instituted in 1936 and received a Stalin Prize in 1943. He was also the recipient of the two Orders of Lenin. The Kazan State Theatre was given his name in 1948.

The Russian director and puppeteer, Sergey Obraztsov, described seeing Kachalov on stage:

That matchless voice of his sounded different each time. Different too was that amazing process of creating a phrase, and every visual image evoked by the word. One had the impression that Kachalov was not merely speaking but thinking aloud, and that the words one heard were only a part of what he was seeing with his inner eye. For that reason people did not merely listen to Kachalov, they watched what he was talking about.

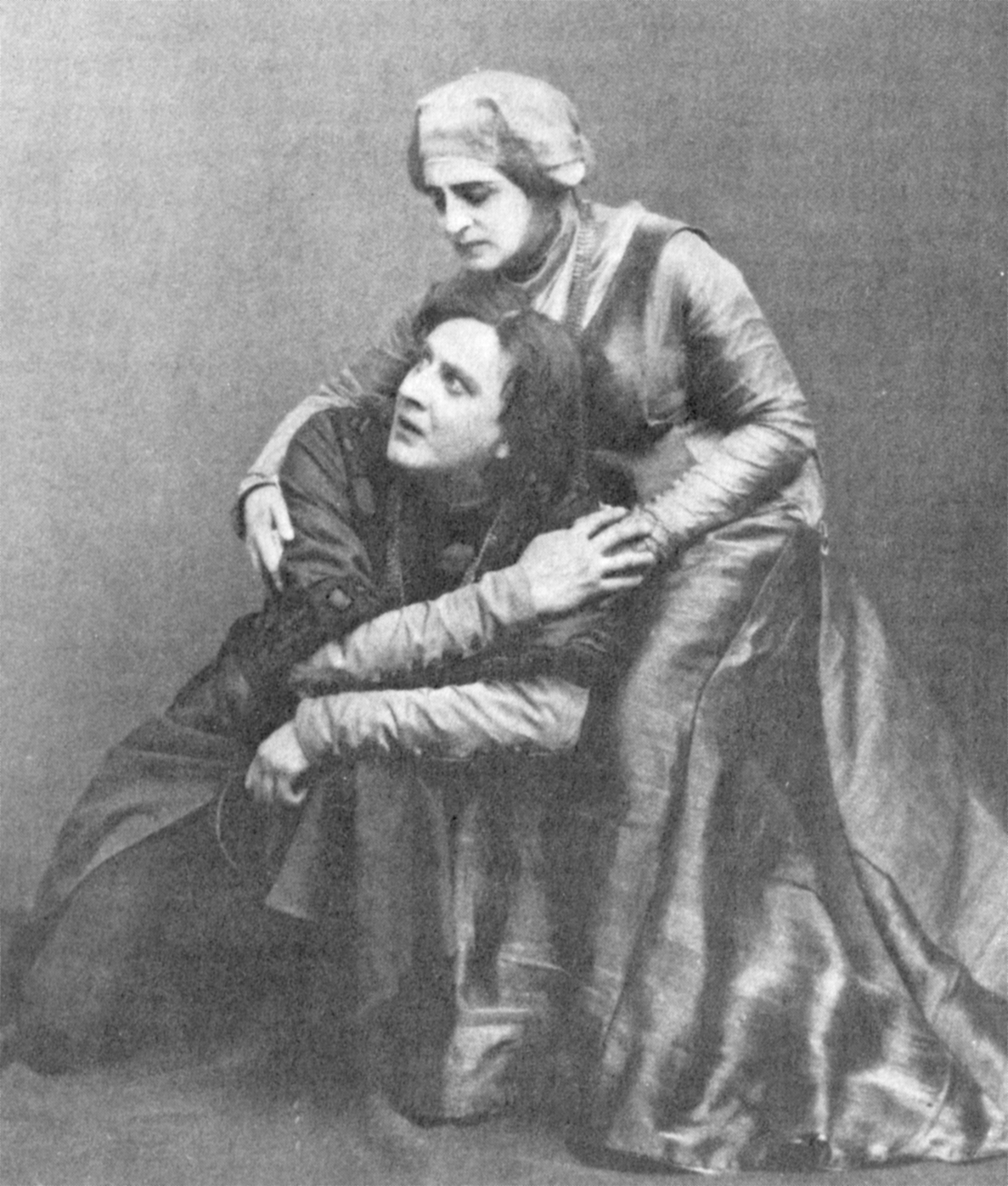
Kachalov and Olga Knipper in Hamlet (1911)

== Notable performances ==
- 1900 – Snow Maiden by Ostrovsky, directed by Stanislavski
- 1900 – When We Dead Awaken by Ibsen, directed by Nemirovich-Danchenko
- 1900 – The Death of Ivan the Terrible, by Al. Tolstoy, dir. by Stanislavski and Nemirovich-Danchenko
- 1901 – Three Sisters by Chekhov, directed by Stanislavski
- 1901 – The Wild Duck by Ibsen
- 1901 – The Seagull by Chekhov, directed by Stanislavski
- 1902 – Three Sisters, by Chekhov
- 1902 – The Lower Depths, by Gorky
- 1903 – The Pillars of Society, by Ibsen
- 1903 – Julius Caesar, by Shakespeare
- 1904 – The Cherry Orchard, by Chekhov
- 1904 – Ivanov, by Chekhov
- 1905 – Ghosts, by Ibsen
- 1906 – Brand, by Ibsen
- 1907 – Boris Godunov, by Pushkin
- 1908 – Rosmersholm, by Ibsen
- 1910 – The Brothers Karamazov, by Dostoevsky
- 1910 – A Month in the Country, by Turgenev
- 1911 – Hamlet, Shakespeare, directed by Gordon Craig
- 1918 – Uncle Vanya, by Anton Chekhov
- 1935 – Enemies, by Gorky
