= Stephen Thomas Ochsner =

American Russian actor, director, producer, musician, translator and designer

- Born: Stephen Thomas Ochsner; 25 July 1988 (age 38); Colorado Springs, Colorado, US
- Education: Woodland Park High School
- Alma mater: Oklahoma City University Moscow Art Theatre School Studio Russian Institute of Theatre Arts
- Occupations: Actor, director, musician, producer, pedagogue
- Height: 1.83 m (6 ft 0 in)

Stephen Thomas Ochsner (born 25 July 1988) is an American actor, director, producer, musician, translator and designer, widely known for his role as Kostya in the more.tv original series, Chicks.

== Early life ==
Ochsner's childhood was spent singing in the United Methodist Church Choir, acting in community theatre and studying music at the Colorado Springs Conservatory and Central City Opera House. His first job was working as a janitor and technical assistant at the Millibo Art Theatre. Ochsner was also an avid snowboarder, rock climber and mountaineer. He received his formal acting and vocal training at the Oklahoma City University School of Theatre, while he built and demounted sets in the university scene shop. At that time, Ochsner worked as an actor and dramaturg for Oklahoma City Repertory Theatre. Between the years of 15 and 20, Ochsner played 11 leading and supporting roles across the midwest, including Mercutio in Romeo and Juliet, George in Our Town, Shen Teh in The Good Person of Szechwan, Kaspar in Amahl and the Night Visitors, Toby in The Medium and Valère in The Miser.

== Theatre ==
In 2008, Ochsner studied for three months at the Moscow Art Theatre School Studio on a program organized by the National Institute of Theatre. Returning to Oklahoma City University, Ochsner led a weekly actor's training laboratory based on the techniques of Michael Chekhov, Vsevolod Meyerhold and Andrei Droznin.

In 2011, Ochsner studied with Viktor Ryzhakov, Igor Zolotovitsky, Sergei Zemtsov and Vladimir Sazhin at the Moscow Art Theatre School Studio. He subsequently studied with Sergei Golomazov at the Russian Institute of Theatre Arts, and in 2012 received his first roles at the Meyerhold Theatre Centre in Everything's Fine (Między nami dobrze jest) by Dorota Masłowska and Sentensii Panteleya Karmanova (The Maxims of Peter Pockets) by Ivan Vyrypaev.

Between 2012 and 2016, Ochsner toured Europe, Russia and the US with Vyrypaev's texts in Russian and English under the direction of Zara Antonyan. Later Ochsner worked with Antonyan co-directing, composing and designing projections for productions based on Hrant Dink and The Master and Margarita at Theater Krefeld und Mönchengladbach, Germany.

From 2014 to 2017, Ochsner lived in Yerevan, Armenia, co-directing, designing, composing and acting at the Yerevan State Puppet Theatre. He also taught acting at the Yerevan State Institute of Theatre and Cinematography.

Year	Genre	Title	Written by	Director	Role	Theatre
	Tragedy	Romeo and Juliet	William Shakespeare		Mercutio	Theatre OCU (Oklahoma)
	Comedy	Lysistrata	Aristophanes			Theatre OCU (Oklahoma)
	Drama	Our Town	Thornton Wilder		George Gibbs	Oklahoma City Repertory Theatre
	Opera	The Good Person of Szechwan	Bertolt Brecht		Shen Teh	Colorado Symphony
	Opera	Amahl and the Night Visitors	Gian Carlo Menotti		Kaspar	Colorado Symphony
	Opera	The Medium	Gian Carlo Menotti		Toby	Colorado Symphony
	Comedy	The Miser	Molière		Valère	
2012	Tragedy	Antigone	Sophocles	Konstantin Mishin	Polynices, Creon	School of Dramatic Art (Moscow)
2013	Drama	Everything's Fine (Między nami dobrze jest)	Dorota Masłowska	Elena Roman	Actor	Meyerhold Theatre Centre (Moscow)
2013	Drama	Sentensii Panteleya Karmanova (The Maxims of Peter Pockets)	Ivan Vyrypaev	Zara Antonayan	Panteley Karmanov	Meyerhold Theatre Centre

== Filmography ==
Ochsner is widely known for his role in the more.tv original series Chicks, about four young women struggling to liberate themselves from the volatile, sex industry in the provincial Caucuses. Ochsner plays the ex-lover to Zhanna (played by Irina Gorbacheva), working as a backhoe operator and fighting to be a good father for his son, Roma (played by Daniil Kuznetsov).

Ochsner's first cinematic role was in Alexei Popogrebski's The Optimists, a foreign diplomacy series set in the Krushchev era at the peak of the Cold War. He played a foreign director in Roskino’s Shoot Moscow in Moscow, produced by Stereotactic for the Russian Pavilion at the 2017 Cannes Film Festival. He played the drug-crazed roommate of Rose (played by Jordan Frye) in Grigory Dobrygin’s Sheena667, and the mysterious man transporting contraband across the Finish border in RIO, written and directed by Zhenia Kazankina. Ochsner has also played roles in Going Vertical, False Flag, and Roommate.

Year	Title	Original Title	Director	Role
2017	The Optimists	Оптимисты	Alexei Popogrebski	John
2017	Going Vertical	Движение вверх	Anton Megerdichev	Journalist
2017	Shoot Moscow in Moscow	Shoot Moscow in Moscow	Alexey Krupnik	Director
2019	Sheena667	Sheena667	Grigory Dobrygin	Roommate
2019	False flag	Фальшивый флаг	Sergey Chekalov	
2019	RIO	РИО	Zhenia Kazankina	Stranger
2019	Big Trip (English version)	Большое путешествие	Vasiliy Rovenskiy, Natalya Nilova	Pelican Duke (voice)
2020	Chicks	Чики	Eduard Oganesyan	Kostya
2020	Roommate	Руммейт	Anna Yanovskaya	Hugh
2020	Magic Arch (English version)	Полное погружение	Vasiliy Rovenskiy	Delphi (voice)
2020	The Other Way Wolf	Волк наоборот	Ira Elshansky	Flow (voice)
2022	Pinocchio: A True Story (English version)	Пиноккио. Правдивая история	Vasiliy Rovenskiy	Fox, Parrot Caro (voice)

== Radio and voice over ==
Ochsner hosted two seasons of Home Away from Home, a program investigating national identity at Radio VAN, Armenia at Radio VAN.

Ochsner has worked in animated films, with credits such as Delphi in Magic Arch 3D, Pelican Duke in Big Trip, Flow in The Other Way Wolf and Stroosh, Luca and Myrrah in Stroosh.

== Music ==
Ochnser has directed, produced and performed in projects “GoatfishSauce” and “Karl and Klara” with singer-songwriter Mitya Zolotov (2014–present). He has also been a member of the project “Kristmas” since it was formed by Cazimir Liske (2011–present).
