= Marjorie L. Hoover =

American academic

Marjorie L. Hoover (1 February 1910 – 25 April 1999) was an American professor of Russian and German literature. She specialized in the study of German and Russian theater. She is known for her 1974 book about Russian theatre director Vsevolod Meyerhold which was a finalist for the National Book Award. As a professor, she was known for her rigorous, challenging cirricula which engaged her students as well as developing and leading some of the first study abroad programs to the Soviet Union.

== Early life and education ==
Hoover was born in New York City. She earned bachelor's and master's degrees from Smith College in French and German in 1930. She then earned a PhD in German Literature from the University of Bonn in 1934, followed by a master's degree in Russian Literature from Yale University. She briefly taught at St. Xavier University in Chicago and Swarthmore College before becoming a professor of Russian and German at Oberlin College.

== Teaching career ==
At Oberlin, she was known for her rigorous cirricula and mentoring students. She developed and hosted a summer study abroad program for her students in Leningrad. She also started an exchange program between her students at Oberlin and Soviet students. At the time, Oberlin was one of the few colleges in the United States to have such study abroad and exchange programs with the Soviet Union.

A noted mentor for her students, Hoover nominated many students for graduate study positions in Russian and German. She was known to mentor women in the fields of Slavic studies at a time when women were under-represented in the field.

Hoover was known to have a rigorous and challenging cirricula, especially for undergraduate studies. She was known to have her studnts quickly learn Russian or German, and then conduct classes (studying literature) entirely in those languages. She required long theses, up to 80-pages, written entirely in Russian, for her Honors students. Her Honors students also had to conduct an oral exam, with outside experts in Russian recruited to conduct the oral exams.

In 1957, Hoover wrote student guides for the study of German works The Diary of Anne Frank and Franz Kafka's Die Verwandlung. She wrote articles about the German theater director Bertolt Brecht. She translated Nikolai Erdman's 1924 play The Mandate in 1975, and wrote a book about Russian playwright Alexander Ostrovsky in 1978. She had almost completed a book about Russian actor and theater director Nikolay Okhlopkov at the time of her death.

Hoover taught at Oberlin College for more than 40 years until her retirement in 1976.

== Published works ==
In the 1974 book, entited Meyerhold: The Art of Conscious Theater, Hoover examined Vsevolod Meyerhold's creative methods, production approaches, and theatrical influences. In a briefly noted review in the journal The Drama Review, the reviewer welcomed the book was one of the first studies of Meyerhold by a Western scholar and in English (along with Edward Braun's 1969 book Meyerhold on Theater). The reviewer noted the four appendices were an excellent addition to the study of Meyerhold, noting that one of the appendices was the first English translation of Meyerhold's pamphlet The Actor's Roles.

Her 1988 book Meyerhold and his Set Designers studied how the director constructed his theatrical scenery. Reviewing the book in the journal New Theatre Quarterly, George Taylor criticized Hoover for not analyzing Meyerhold's ideology that lay behind his set designs. He described her writing style as awkward and confusing, while also lacking in analyses of Meyerhold and his designers' motivations and influences. He stated the work lacked the analytical detail needed to reconstruct any one of Meyerhold's sets. Taylor concluded the book was a "disappointing contribution to the increasingly sophisticated analysis in English of Meyerhold's seminal influence as a director."

== Personal life ==
She was a keen swimmer, swimming in the Neva River in Leningrad on a daily basis during her summer study abroad seminars, and regularly swimming at the YMCA in New York during her retirement. She was married to Andrew Hoover, who was an English professor at Oberlin. They had two sons, John and James.
