= House of Vsevolod Meyerhold =

Museum-theater in Penza, Russia

Centre of Theatrical Arts
- Центр театрального искусства «Дом Мейерхольда»
- Vsevolod Meyerhold Museum
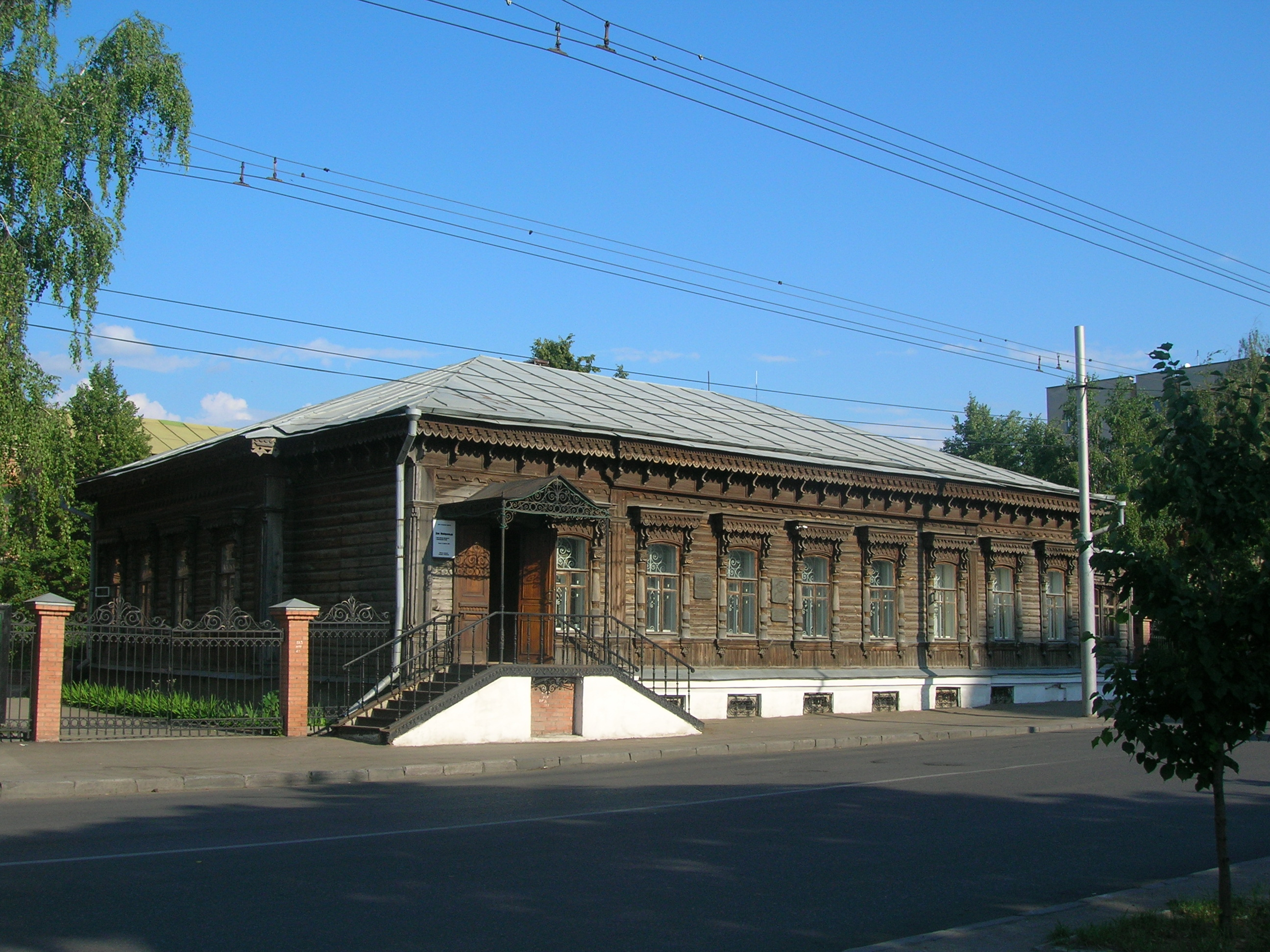
- Interactive map of Centre of Theatrical Arts
- Address: 59 Volodarskogo Street; Penza; Russia
- Coordinates: 53.19451°N 45.01447°E
- Capacity: 60 seats

Construction
- Opened: 24 February 1984; 42 years ago
- Years active: 1984-present

Website
- www.dommeyerholda.ru

The House of Meyerhold (Russian: Дом Мейерхольда) is a historic building in Penza, Russia. It currently houses a museum and theatre, the GBUK Centre of Theatrical Arts "Meyerhold's House" (Russian: ГБУК Центр театрального искусства «Дом Мейерхо́льда»).

== History ==
The house was built from wood in 1881 as part of a manor complex for the Penza merchant and winemaker Emil Teodorovich Meyerhold. The estate included a winery and outbuildings. The house has a cellar, and a total area of 340 sq.m. It was restored between 1979 and 1982, preserving the original layout and design of the facade. The house was a childhood home of Russian and Soviet theatre director, actor and theatrical producer Vsevolod Meyerhold, from 1881 to 1895. The house of has the status of an object of an object of cultural heritage of federal significance, by Decree of the Council of Ministers of the RSFSR, No. 624, on 4 December 1974.

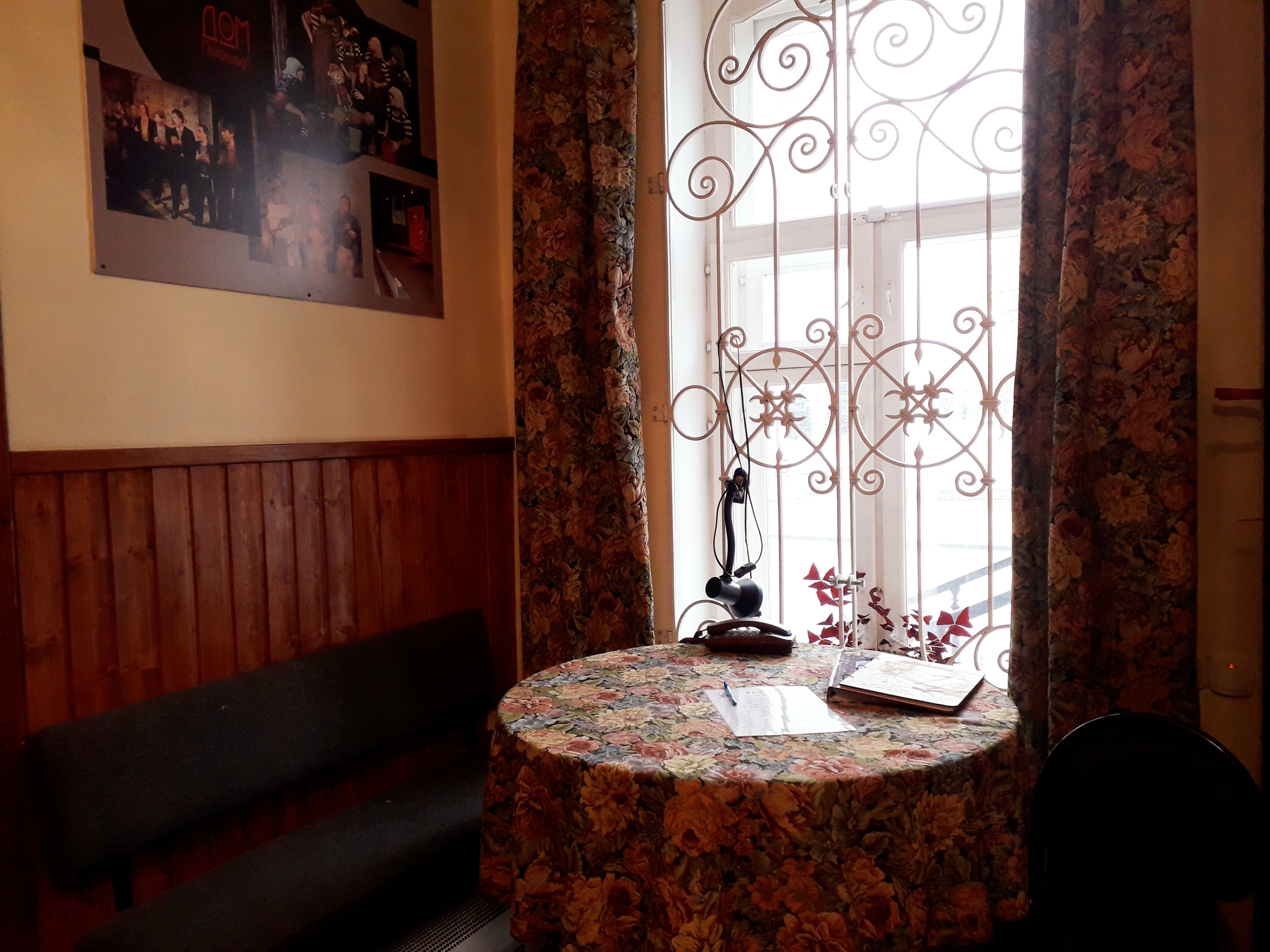

== Museum ==
The museum was opened on 24 February 1984, to commemorate 110 years since Vsevolod Meyerhold's birth in 1874. On its opening it became the first memorial established to Meyerhold. Meyerhold's granddaughter, Maria Alekseyevna Valentey, donated items and artefacts to the museum, whose collections now contain around 10,000 items, and include documents, manuscripts, and photographs. The museum initially included displays on the life and work of other Penza artists, including Vsevolod Pudovkin, Lidia Ruslanova, Aleksandr Arkhangelsky, and the Mozzhukhin brothers, Ivan and Aleksandr.

In 1994, the museum exhibition was reworked to be entirely devoted to the life and work of Vsevolod Meyerhold. International conferences were held at the museum in 1989 and 1994, to mark the 115th and 120th anniversaries of Meyerhold's birth. In 1989, the state experimental theatre studio Proscenium opened at the museum. On 20 November 1999, the world's first monument to Vsevolod Meyerhold, a bronze statue sculpted by Penza resident Yury E. Tkachenko, was unveiled on the museum's grounds. That year the exposition "The Life and Work of Vs. Meyerhold" was opened in the museum.

In 2003, the government of Penza Oblast reorganized the museum as the GBUK Theatre Arts Centre "Meyerhold's House", with the State Drama Theatre "Doctor Dapertutto" as part of the centre. Pavel Rudnev was the artistic director of Vsevolod Meyerhold Center from 2004 to 2011.

In 2014, the exhibition "Meyerhold. Chronicles" was opened to celebrate the 140th anniversary of Meyerhold's birth. The exhibition covers Meyerhold's time living in Penza. In 2023 the museum joined the Association of Theatre Museums.
