= Penza =

Penza Пенза
- City
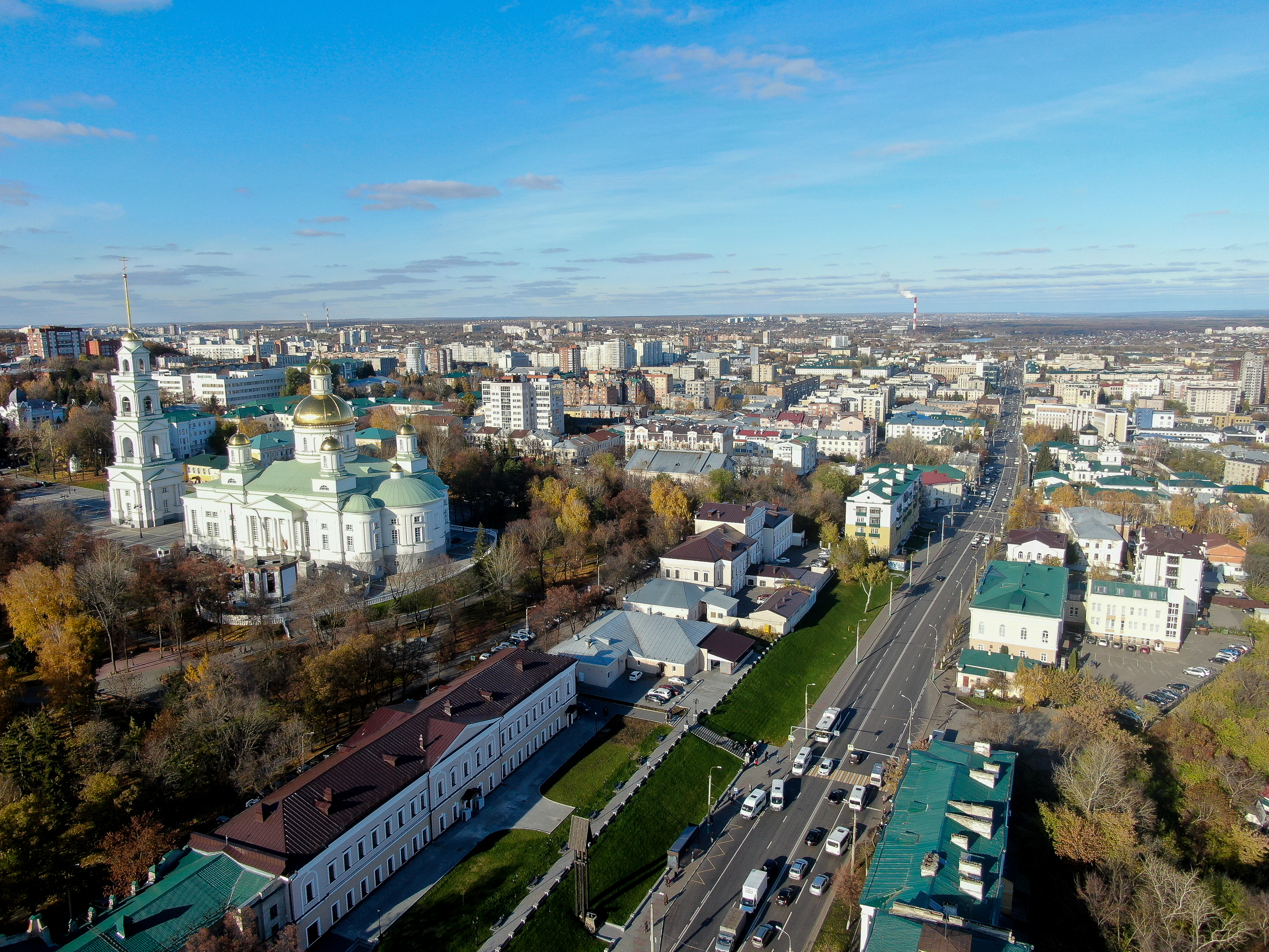
- View of the Church of the Merciful Saviour

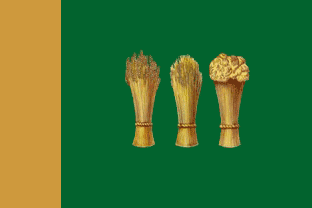
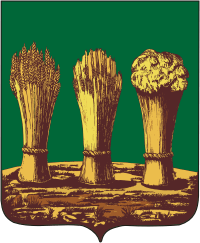
- Flag Coat of arms
- Interactive map of Penza
- Location of Penza Penza (European Russia) Penza (Europe)
- Coordinates: 53°12′N 45°00′E
- Country: Russia
- Federal subject: Penza Oblast
- Founded: 1663

Government
  - Body: City Duma
  - Head: Vladimir Mutovkin
- Elevation: 150 m (490 ft)

Population (2010 Census)
  - Total: 517,311
  - Estimate (2025): 522,823 (+1.1%)
  - Rank: 34th in 2010

Administrative status
  - Subordinated to: city of oblast significance of Penza
  - Capital of: Penza Oblast, city of oblast significance of Penza

Municipal status
  - Urban okrug: Penza Urban Okrug
  - Capital of: Penza Urban Okrug
- Time zone: UTC+3 (MSK)
- Postal codes: 440000, 440001, 440003–440005, 440007–440009, 440011–440015, 440018, 440020, 440022, 440023, 440025, 440026, 440028, 440031–440035, 440039, 440040, 440042, 440044–440047, 440049, 440052, 440054, 440056, 440058, 440060–440062, 440064, 440066–440068, 440071, 440072, 440700, 440890, 440899, 440960, 440961, 440999
- Dialing code: +7 8412
- OKTMO ID: 56701000001
- Website: www.penza-gorod.ru

Penza (Russian: Пенза, IPA: [ˈpʲenzə]) is the largest city and administrative center of Penza Oblast, Russia. It is located on the Sura River, 625 kilometers (388 mi) southeast of Moscow. As of the 2010 Census, Penza had a population of 517,311, making it the 36th-largest city in Russia.

Historical population
Year	Pop.	±%
1897	59,981	—
1926	90,813	+51.4%
1939	159,776	+75.9%
1959	255,481	+59.9%
1970	373,650	+46.3%
1979	482,916	+29.2%
1989	542,612	+12.4%
2002	518,025	−4.5%
2010	517,311	−0.1%
2021	501,109	−3.1%
Source: Censuses

== Etymology ==
The city's name derives from a hydronym in the Moksha language, пенза penza, meaning 'end of a swampy river'.

== Geography ==
=== Location and terrain ===
Penza is located in the central part of the Penza Oblast, on the banks of the Sura River (a tributary of the Volga) and its tributaries (the streams Penza, Ardym, Moika, and Penzyatka). Some of the rivers and streams flowing through Penza are partially enclosed in culverts. The city has a hilly terrain.

=== Urban layout ===
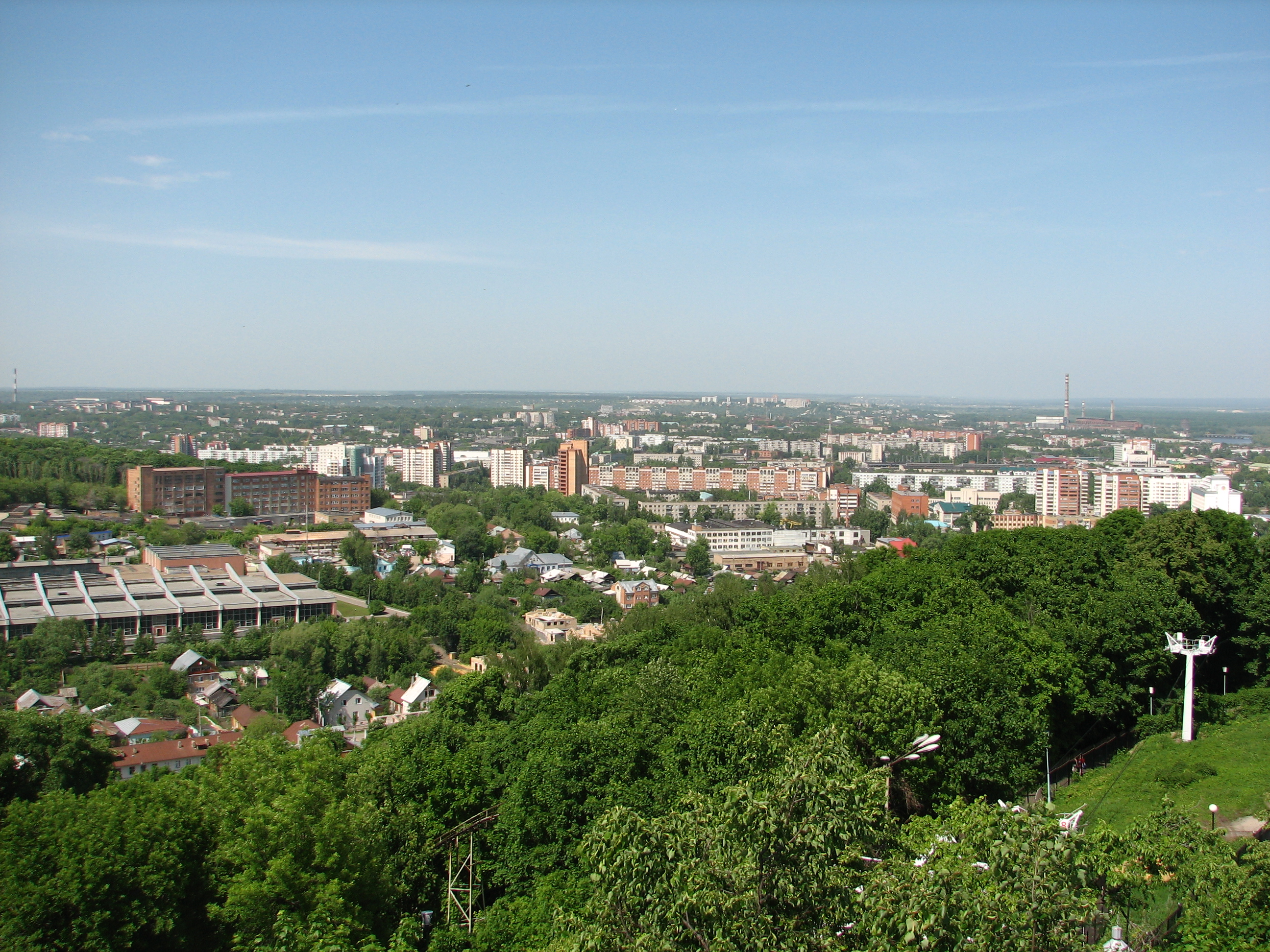
Penza as seen from the highest point of the city

The city is divided into four administrative districts: Leninsky (the central district), Oktyabrsky, Zheleznodorozhny (the only one partially located on the right bank of the Sura), and Pervomaysky.

The central quarter of the city occupies the territory on which the wooden fortress Penza was once located; therefore, it is sometimes called the Serf. The architectural concept of the old fortress, erected on the eastern slope of the mountain above the river, predetermined the direction of the first streets. The direction and location of the first streets were set by the passage towers of the fortress and the orientation of its walls. This is how the first six streets of the city were formed. Subsequently, the names were fixed to them: Governor's, Lekarskaya, Moscow, Nikolskaya, Sadovaya and Teatralnaya.

An important element of the urban development of the city is that the square of the fortress created a network of streets converging at right angles. Initially, there was no proper harmony in them. Often the difficult terrain of the area forced the direction and width of the road to change. Here and there, spontaneous development took shape. Nevertheless, the urban planning matrix was created and predetermined the development of the city for several centuries. During the reign of Empress Catherine the Great, the first general plan of Penza was drawn up, it was approved on 6 October 1785. The city was rebuilt anew in accordance with the rectilinear structure of St. Petersburg. The plan of the city, in its central part practically did not change, as it fully complied with the new norms of Russian urban planning. The mutually perpendicular orientation of the streets and the accompanying division of the urban environment into standard quarters was the original and distinctive feature of Penza. Perhaps Penza owes this to its first builders, who are well acquainted with the European urban planning trends of the 17th century - the German Joseph von Sommer (Lieutenant Colonel of the Moscow Service Osip Zumerovsky) and the Polish nobleman Yuri Kotransky. At the end of the next 18th century, in the process of implementing Catherine's master plan for Penza, only some sections of the old streets were straightened, the standard width of the roadway and sidewalks was set. The redevelopment of the city was preceded by the resettlement of the serving suburban population from the center to suburban villages and wastelands. Newly carved quarters of the Upland part of the city, more comfortable for living, were inhabited by the nobility and eminent merchants. Initially, the fortress was not only a defense complex, but also the administrative center of a vast region. On that place the governor, archives, treasury, prison, arsenal and other instruments of the regional statehood were settled. In the fortress there was the main cathedral of the region – Spassky and the main square of the city – Cathedral. In accordance with the General Plan of 1785, the dilapidated fortress, trading rows and philistine buildings adjacent to its walls were dismantled. As a result of clearing, the Posadskaya Nikolskaya church came out of the environment of spontaneous buildings and acquired a harmonious look, becoming a true decoration of the city.

For several years, on the territory of the central quarter and adjacent streets, state-owned stone buildings were complexly erected: the bishop's courtyard, the governor's residence, the assembly of the nobility and two buildings of public places (7.1 and 7.4).) By the beginning of the 20th century, private residential There are no buildings left in the Fortress Quarter of the city. In the Fortress Quarter there is also a special administrative street of the city – the Line of Public Places, passing from Sadovaya to Moskovskaya, bypassing the Spassky Cathedral. It has never had and still does not have residential buildings. the eastern earthen rampart of the old Penza fortress The ancient defensive rampart runs along the western side of Kirov Street (this section of Kirov Street was formerly called Teatralnaya Street).

The cathedral was destroyed by the Communists in 1934, and rebuilt between 2010 and 2022.

== Paleontology ==
In 1927, a fragmentary skull of the giant marine reptile Mosasaurus hoffmanni was found in the Late Maastrichtian (Late Cretaceous) deposits near Mironositskoe cemetery, within Penza. This specimen became the first unequivocal record of this species in Russia. The exact place where fossil was collected is unknown, but, most likely, Prolomnaya Street is located there now. Belemnites Belemnitella lanceolata and B. americana were also collected from Maastrichtian layers along the banks of the Sura River in Penza area. Tsaregradskii (1926) reports about the oyster Ostrea praesinzowi from the same deposits. In addition, these layers contain a mixed complex of microfaunal characteristics of the Turonian (Bolivinita couvigeriniformis), Santonian (Reussia subrotundata) and Maastrichtian (Bolivina incrassata) ages, indicating that all of these deposits were eroded and redeposited.

== History ==
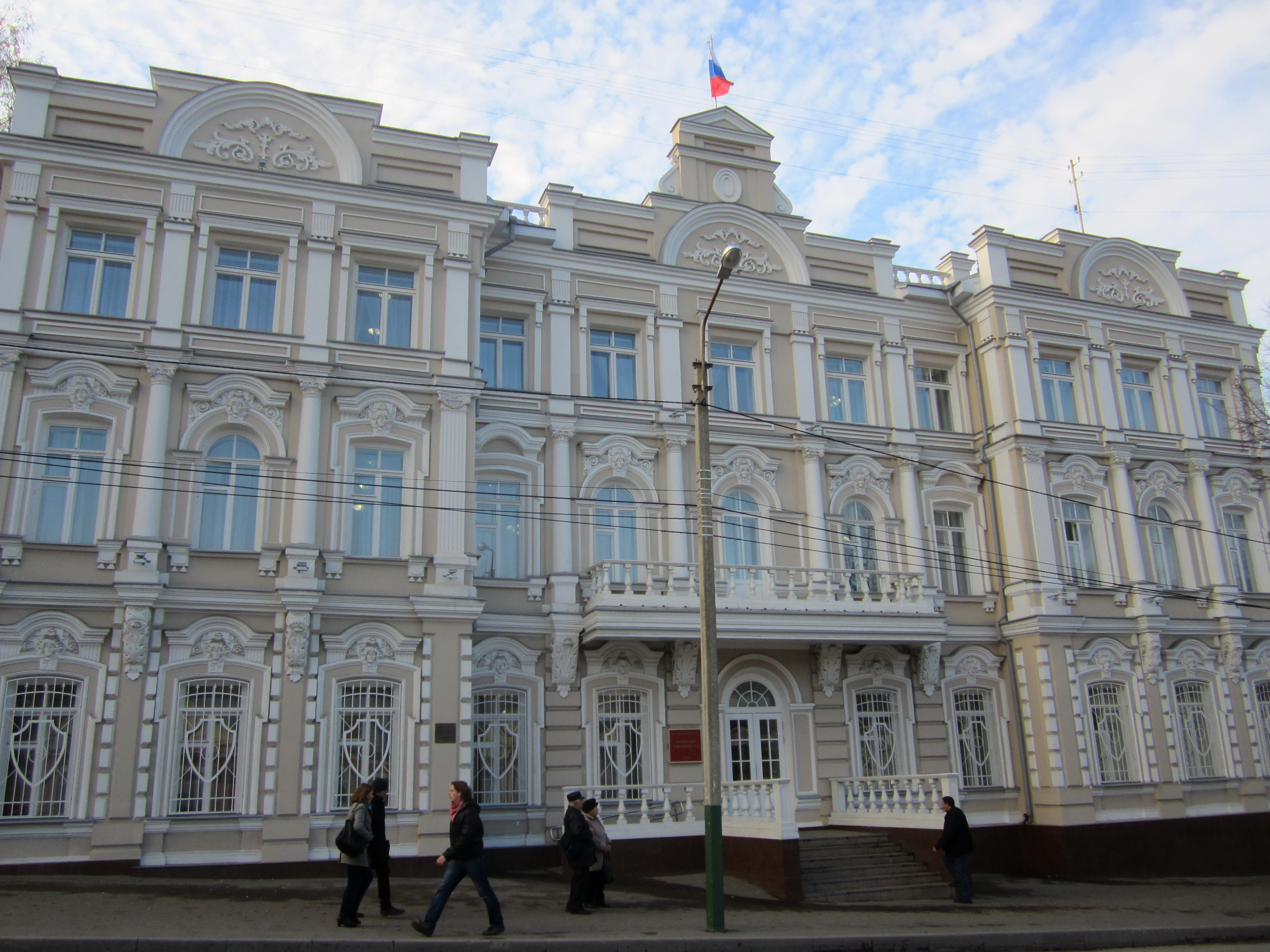
An 18th-century house in Penza

Penza was founded as a Russian frontier fortress-city, and to this day, remnants of the Lomovskaya sentry line built in 1640 have been preserved at the western edge of the city, and remains of earth ramparts dating from the mid-16th century are preserved in the city center. Until 1663, Penza was a wooden stockade with only a small settlement. In May 1663, the architect Yuri Kontransky arrived in Penza on the Tsar's orders to direct the construction of a fortress city, as part of a wider fortress building program to protect Russia from attacks by Crimean Tatars. The initial construction consisted of a wooden Kremlin, a village, and quarters for the nobility, small tradesmen, and merchants. The Muscovite government placed the Cossacks here, who constructed a fortress and called it "Cherkassy Ostroh", from which the regional city of Penza has developed, thanks to the arrival of new settlers, particularly Russians. The Cossack roots of the city and its first settlers are now remembered in the names of Cherkasskaya street, along with the "Cherkassy" historical district.

In 1774, the insurgent army led by Yemelyan Pugachev occupied Penza after the citizens of the city welcomed the rebellious Cossacks. The first stone houses started to appear after 1801, and by 1809 Penza's population had grown to more than 13,000 people.

In 1918, Vladimir Lenin sent a telegram to communists in the Penza area, complaining about the "insurrection of five kulak districts". He urged the public hanging of 100 "landlords, richmen, bloodsuckers", grain seizure, and hostage-liberation. This telegram has been used in several historical works on the period and on Lenin. During the Russian Civil War, the Czechoslovak Legions launched an anti-Bolshevik uprising in Penza.

During the Soviet period, the city developed as a regional industrial center. The Ural mainframe was made here between 1959 and 1964.

== Administrative and municipal status ==
The Administrative divisions of Penza consists of 4 districts;

- Zheleznodorozhny district
- Leninsky district
- Oktyabrsky district
- Pervomaysky district

Penza is the administrative center of the oblast. Within the framework of administrative divisions, it is incorporated as the city of oblast significance of Penza—an administrative unit with a status equal to that of the districts. As a municipal division, the city of oblast significance of Penza is incorporated as Penza Urban Okrug.

== Transportation ==
Penza is a major railway junction and lies on the M5 highway linking Moscow and Chelyabinsk. Penza Airport serves domestic flights. Local public transport includes buses, trolleybuses and marshrutkas (routed taxis).

== Education and culture ==
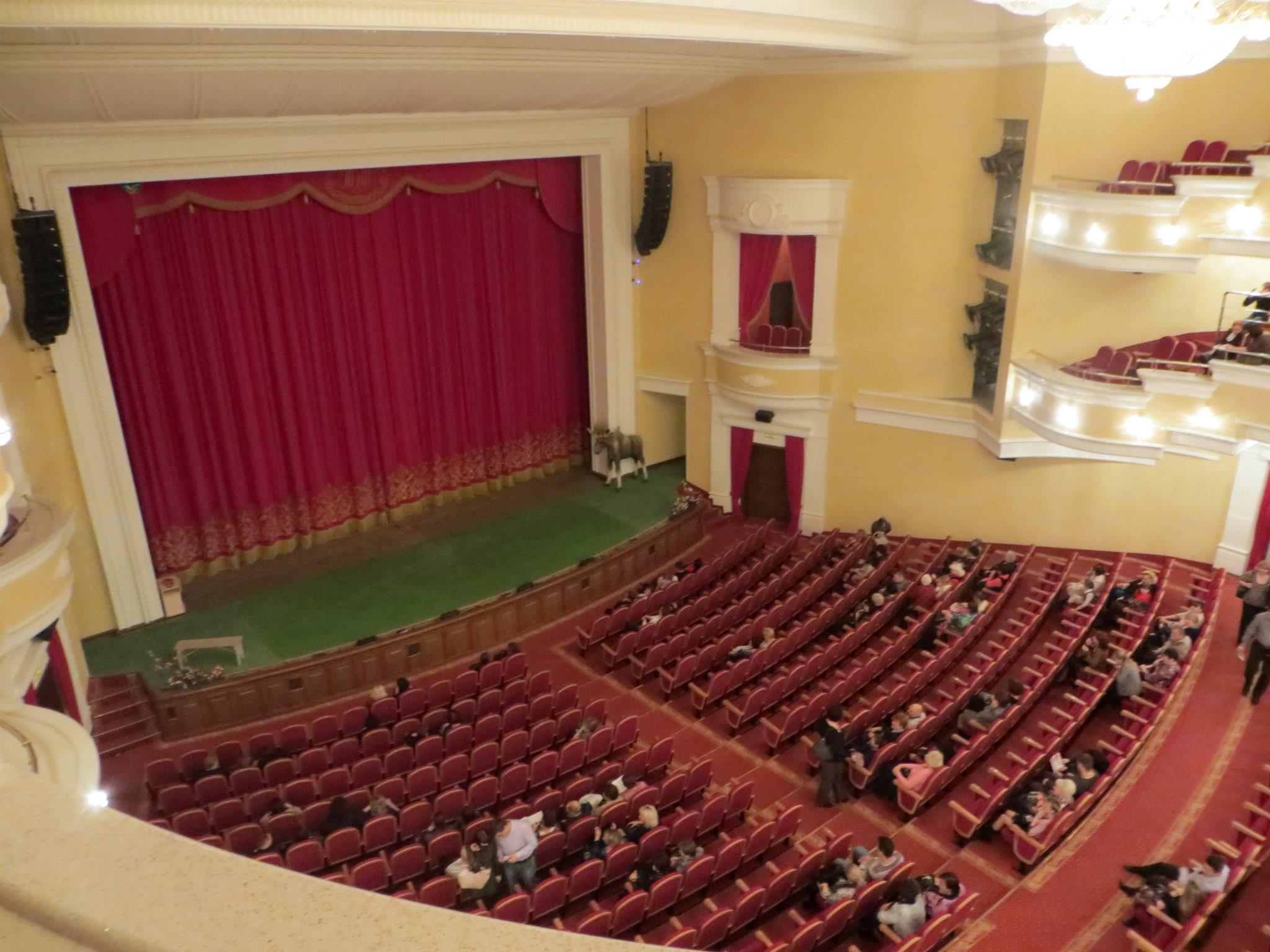
The main stage inside the A. V. Lunacharsky Drama Theater

Currently, the city of Penza is seen as a regional center for higher education. It has six universities (the Penza State University, the Pedagogic University, the Academy of Agriculture, the Technology Institute, the University of Architecture and Construction, and the Artillery and Engineering Institute), 13 colleges and 77 public schools. Penza's largest repertoire theatre is Penza Oblast Drama Theater named after A. V. Lunacharsky. Another prominent and unique theater is the Theater of Doctor Dapertutto, founded by Natalia Kugel and located in the former home of Russian theater director Vsevolod Meyerhold. Besides this, Penza is home to four museums, and three art galleries including The Museum of One Painting named after G. V. Myasnikov.

Facilities of higher education include:

- Penza State University
- Penza State Pedagogical University (unified with Penza State University in 2012)
- Penza State University of Architecture and Construction
- Penza Artillery Engineering Institute
- Penza State Technological Academy
- Penza State Agricultural University
- Penza branch of the Moscow's Institute of Economics, Management and Law
- Penza branch of the Russian State University of Innovative Technologies and Entrepreneurship

== Climate ==
Penza has a humid continental climate (Köppen climate classification Dfb) with long, cold winters and warm summers. Due to the vast landmass, the summer is much warmer than its 53°N latitude would suggest. The same factors also result in very cold winters by upper mid-latitude European standards. A heat wave in the months of June, July, and August 2010, raised temperatures from previous norms often by 15 °C (27 °F) in Penza. Some of the higher fluctuations in temperatures were recorded with seven straight days of temperatures +40 °C (104 °F) and higher compared to the previous year where the higher temperatures for the same period were, on average, 20 °C (36 °F) lower.

Climate data for Penza (1991–2020, extremes 1850–present)
Month	Jan	Feb	Mar	Apr	May	Jun	Jul	Aug	Sep	Oct	Nov	Dec	Year
Record high °C (°F)	7.0 (44.6)	8.5 (47.3)	18.3 (64.9)	28.3 (82.9)	35.6 (96.1)	37.7 (99.9)	39.3 (102.7)	40.4 (104.7)	33.6 (92.5)	25.6 (78.1)	18.6 (65.5)	11.0 (51.8)	40.4 (104.7)
Mean daily maximum °C (°F)	−5.5 (22.1)	−4.5 (23.9)	1.6 (34.9)	13.0 (55.4)	21.5 (70.7)	24.9 (76.8)	27.0 (80.6)	25.4 (77.7)	18.8 (65.8)	10.3 (50.5)	1.3 (34.3)	−4.0 (24.8)	10.8 (51.4)
Daily mean °C (°F)	−8.6 (16.5)	−8.5 (16.7)	−2.9 (26.8)	7.0 (44.6)	14.8 (58.6)	18.6 (65.5)	20.7 (69.3)	18.9 (66.0)	12.9 (55.2)	6.1 (43.0)	−1.5 (29.3)	−6.8 (19.8)	5.9 (42.6)
Mean daily minimum °C (°F)	−11.7 (10.9)	−12.0 (10.4)	−6.8 (19.8)	1.9 (35.4)	8.6 (47.5)	12.6 (54.7)	14.7 (58.5)	13.1 (55.6)	8.1 (46.6)	2.6 (36.7)	−3.9 (25.0)	−9.6 (14.7)	1.5 (34.7)
Record low °C (°F)	−39.9 (−39.8)	−38.3 (−36.9)	−29.3 (−20.7)	−16.6 (2.1)	−5.6 (21.9)	−0.8 (30.6)	4.7 (40.5)	1.4 (34.5)	−6.4 (20.5)	−17.1 (1.2)	−29.7 (−21.5)	−40.5 (−40.9)	−40.5 (−40.9)
Average precipitation mm (inches)	41 (1.6)	34 (1.3)	37 (1.5)	38 (1.5)	45 (1.8)	62 (2.4)	56 (2.2)	52 (2.0)	50 (2.0)	47 (1.9)	44 (1.7)	43 (1.7)	549 (21.6)
Average rainy days	6	5	7	13	16	19	18	16	17	17	12	8	154
Average snowy days	26	22	16	5	1	0.1	0	0	0.3	5	17	25	117
Average relative humidity (%)	84	82	79	68	61	67	69	70	73	79	86	85	75
Mean monthly sunshine hours	42	77	138	200	275	294	302	260	162	92	45	30	1,917
Source 1: Pogoda.ru.net
Source 2: Climatebase (sun 1971–2012)

== Sports ==
Penza first hosted the Russian Sidecarcross Grand Prix in 2009, and did so again in 2010, on August 15.

Dizel Penza is Penza's professional hockey team, playing in the VHL. Dizelist Penza is a junior club playing in the NMHL.

The city football team FC Zenit Penza was established in 1918 but now plays in the Russian Second League. Penza has also a professional rugby union club, Lokomotiv Penza, from Russia's Rugby Championship.

== Honors ==
A minor planet, 3189 Penza, discovered by Soviet astronomer Nikolai Chernykh in 1978, is named after the city.

== People ==
- Denis Ablyazin, world and Olympic medalist in artistic gymnastics
- Sergey Andronov, ice hockey player
- Igor Chernyshov, ice hockey player
- Aleksandr Golikov, ice hockey player
- Vladimir Golikov, ice hockey player
- Nikolai Ishutin, utopian socialist
- Victor Karpov, diplomat
- Pyotr Kochetkov, ice hockey player
- Klim Kostin, ice hockey player
- Alexander Kozhevnikov, ice hockey player
- Egor Kreed, singer, rapper
- Anna Kuznetsova, politician
- Nadezhda Ladygina-Kohts, zoopsychologist
- Natalia Lavrova, world and Olympic champion in rhythmic gymnastics
- Aristarkh Lentulov, avant-garde artist
- Mikhail Lermontov, poet, grew up in nearby manor of Tarkhany
- Maria Lvova-Belova, politician
- Andreï Makine, author
- Alexander Medvedkin, film director
- Yuri Moiseev, ice hockey player
- Vsevolod Meyerhold, actor and directоr
- Ivan Mozzhukhin, silent film actor
- Vasily Pervukhin, ice hockey player
- Galina Savelyeva, gynaecologist
- Maria Sittel, journalist
- Peter Hermann Stillmark, scientist, founder of lectinology
- Sergei Svetlov, ice hockey player
- Sergei Yashin, ice hockey player
- Lavrenty Zagoskin, explorer of Alaska
- Vsevolod Konstantinov, psychologist
- Nikolai Avksentiev, politician

== Twin towns – sister cities ==
Penza is twinned with:

- Békéscsaba, Hungary (1970)
- Busan, South Korea (2007)
- Lanzhou, China
- Ramat Gan, Israel (2007)
- Mogilev, Belarus (2008)

== See also ==
- Center of Theatrical Arts «House of Meyerhold»
- Penza Planetarium
- List of largest cuckoo clocks
- Messi (cougar)
