= Vsevolod Meyerhold =

Russian theatre director (1874–1940)

- Всеволод Мейерхольд
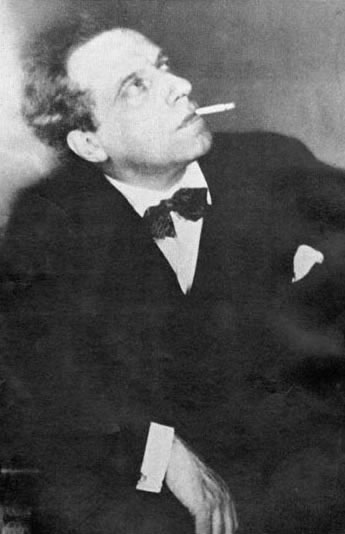
- Born: Karl Kasimir Theodor Meyerhold; 9 February [O.S. 28 January] 1874; Penza, Russia
- Died: 2 February 1940 (aged 65); Moscow, Russian SFSR, Soviet Union
- Education: Moscow Art Theatre
- Known for: Theatre director
- Movement: Symbolism; futurism; constructivistm
- Spouses: Olga Munt (m. 1896); Zinaida Reich (m. 1922; died 1939)
- Patrons: Vera Komissarzhevskaya

Vsevolod Emilyevich Meyerhold or Meyerkhold (Russian: Всеволод Эмильевич Мейерхольд; born Karl Kasimir Theodor Meyerhold; (Note: Russian: Карл Казимир Теодор Майерхольд, romanized: Karl Kazimir Teodor Mayerkhold.) 9 February [O.S. 28 January] 1874 – 2 February 1940) was a Russian and Soviet theatre director, actor and theatrical producer. His provocative experiments dealing with physical being and symbolism in an unconventional theatre setting made him one of the seminal forces in modern international theatre. During the Great Purge, Meyerhold was arrested in June 1939. He was tortured, his wife was murdered, and he was executed on 2 February 1940.

== Life and work ==
=== Early life ===
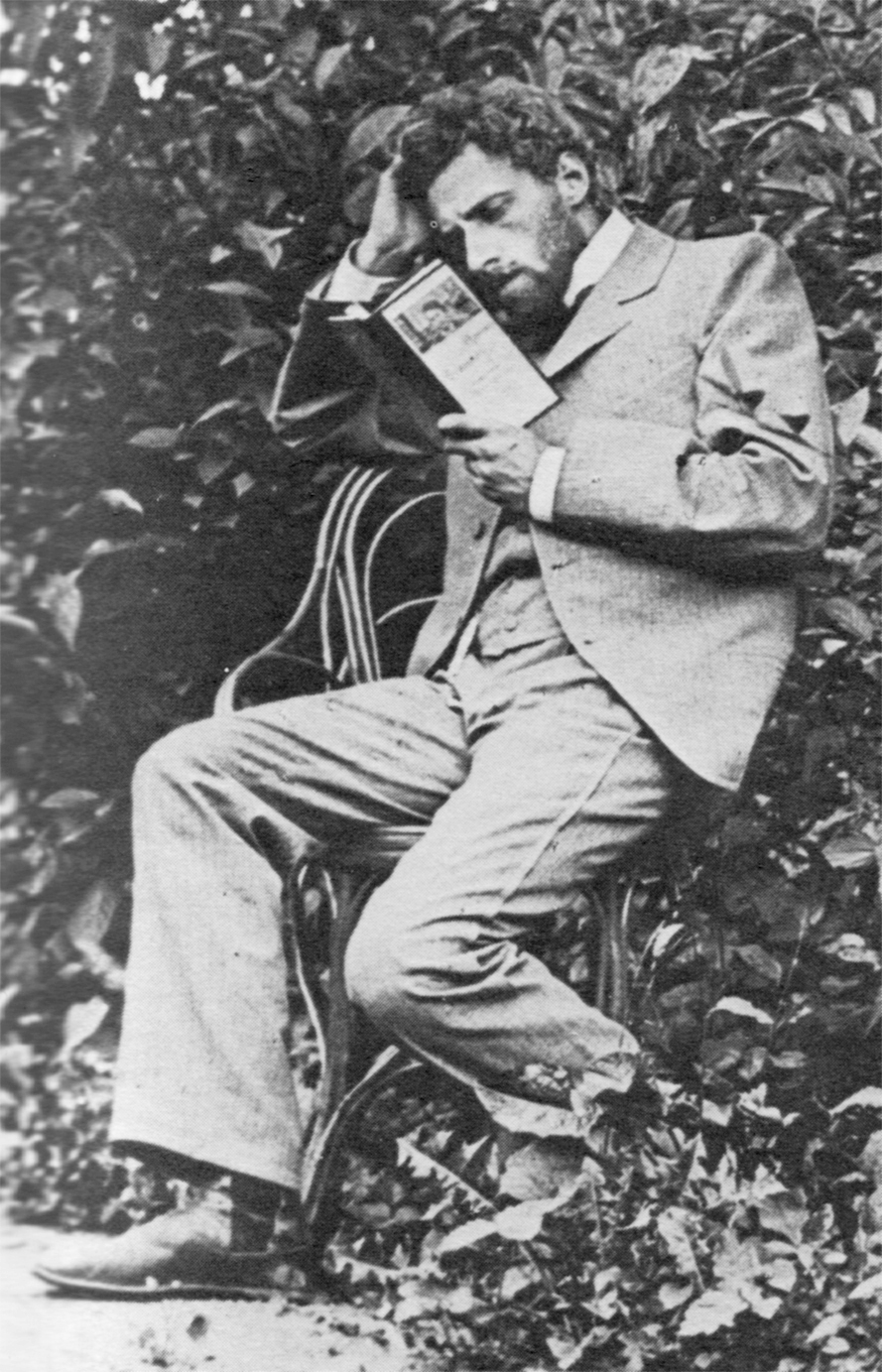
Meyerhold preparing for the role of Treplev in Stanislavsky's 1898 Moscow Art Theater production of The Seagull by Anton Chekhov.

Vsevolod Meyerhold was born Karl Kasimir Theodor Meyerhold in Penza on 9 February [O.S. 28 January] 1874 to Russian-German wine manufacturer Friedrich Emil Meyerhold and his Baltic German wife, Alvina Danilovna (née van der Neese). He was the youngest of eight children. His father came from an old noble family Meyerhold von Ritterholm. The elder Meyerhold emigrated to Russia in the 1850s.

After completing school in 1895, Meyerhold studied law at Moscow University but never completed his degree. He was torn between studying theatre or a career as a violinist. However, he failed his audition to become the second violinist in the University orchestra and in 1896 joined the Moscow Philharmonic Dramatic School.

On his 21st birthday, he converted from Lutheranism to Orthodox Christianity and accepted "Vsevolod" as an Orthodox Christian name (after the Russian writer Vsevolod Garshin, whose prose he loved).

=== Early career ===
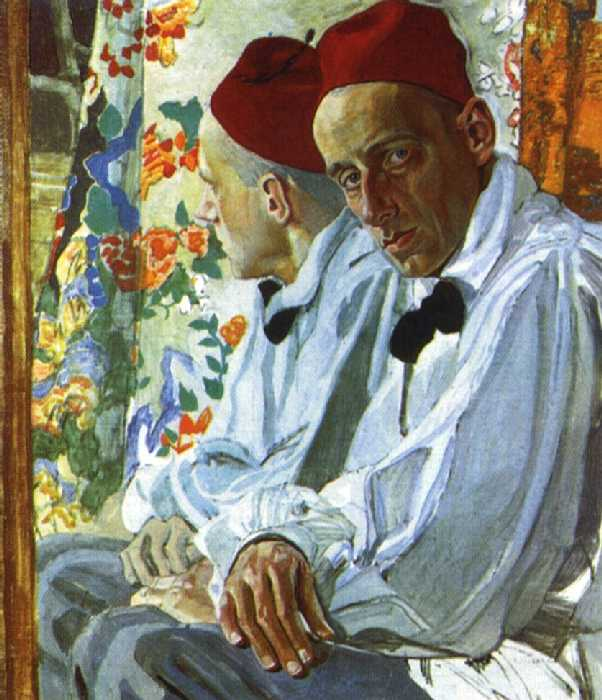
Alexander Golovin's portrait of Meyerhold.

Meyerhold began acting in 1896 as a student of the Moscow Philharmonic Dramatic School under the guidance of Vladimir Nemirovich-Danchenko, co-founder with Konstantin Stanislavsky of the Moscow Art Theatre. At the MAT, Meyerhold played 18 roles, such as Vasiliy Shuiskiy in Tsar Fyodor Ioannovich and Ivan the Terrible in The Death of Ivan the Terrible (both by Aleksey Tolstoy). In 1898, in the first successful production of Chekhov's first play, The Seagull, Meyerhold played the lead male role, opposite Chekhov's future wife, Olga Knipper.

After leaving the MAT in 1902, wanting to break free of the highly naturalistic 'missing fourth wall' productions of Stanislavsky and Nemirovich-Danchenko, Meyerhold participated in a number of theatrical projects, as both a director and actor. Each project was an arena for experiment and creation of new staging methods. Meyerhold was one of the most fervent advocates of Symbolism in theatre, especially when he worked as the chief producer of the Vera Komissarzhevskaya theatre in 1906–1907. He was invited back to the MAT around this time to pursue his experimental ideas.

Meyerhold continued theatrical innovation during the decade 1907–1917, while working with the imperial theatres in St. Petersburg. He introduced classical plays in an innovative manner, and staged works of controversial contemporary authors like Fyodor Sologub, Zinaida Gippius, and Alexander Blok. In these plays, Meyerhold tried to return acting to the traditions of Commedia dell'arte, rethinking them for the contemporary theatrical reality. His theoretical concepts of the "conditional theatre" were elaborated in his book On Theatre in 1913.

=== Career under communism ===
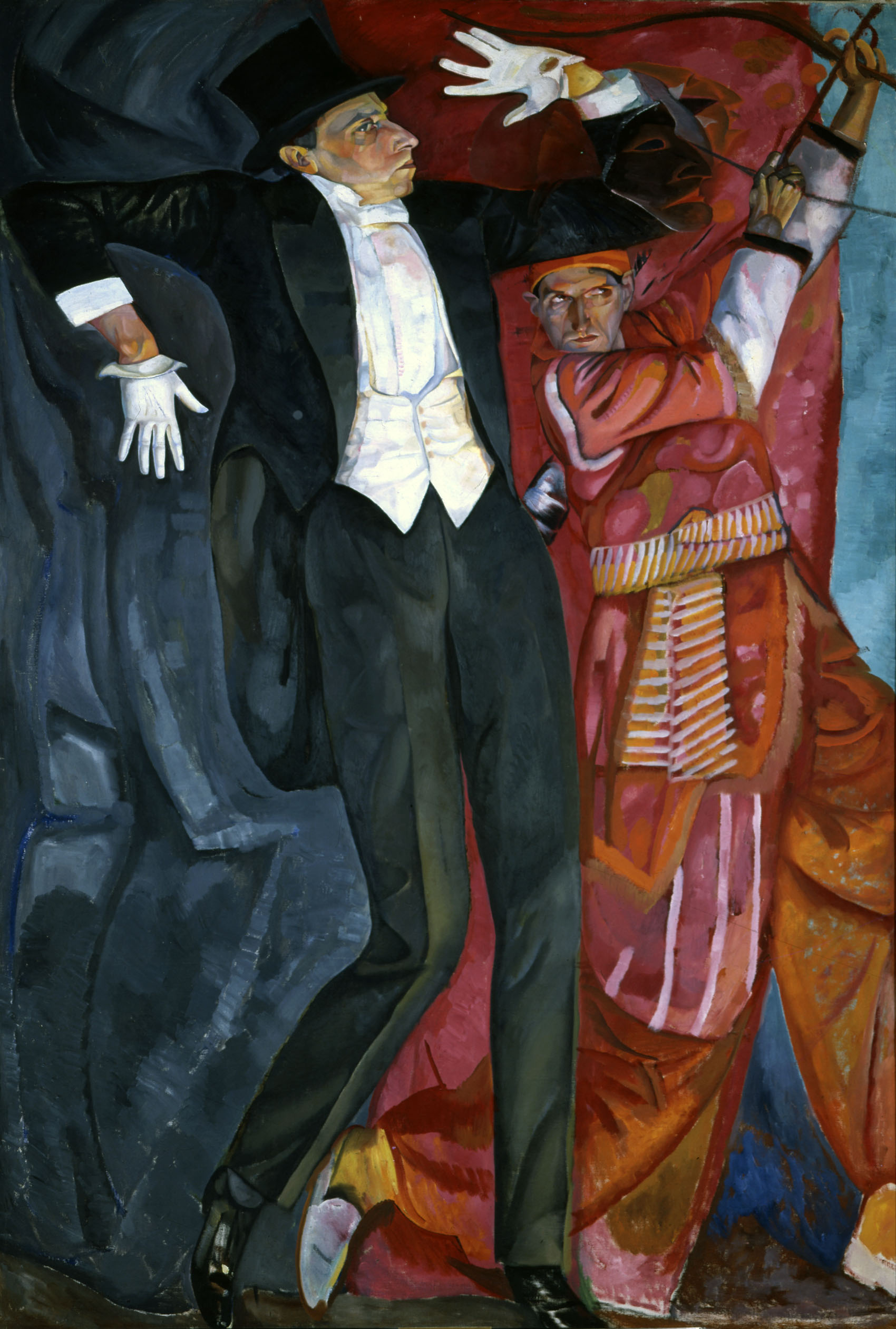
Portrait of Vsevolod Meyerhold(1916) by Boris Grigoriev, depicting Meyerhold sharing the stage with his alter ego 'Doctor Dapertutto', a pseudonym he had borrowed from a character in E.T.A. Hoffmann's Adventure on New Year's Eve.

On the day when the February Revolution broke out – on 25 February, under the old style calendar then used in Russia – Meyerhold's production of Masquerade by Mikhail Lermontov had a dress rehearsal at the Alexandrinsky Theatre, in front of an audience that included the poet Anna Akhmatova. That evening has been described as "the last act of the tragedy of the old regime, when the Petersburg elite went to enjoy themselves at this splendidly luxurious production in the midst of the chaos and confusion." Sergei Eisenstein, who was then a teenager but would later be a world-renowned film director, desperately wanted to see the production, having heard that it featured clowns, but having made his way across the city that was in the throes of a revolution was disappointed to discover that the Alexandrinsky was closed.

Meyerhold was one of the first prominent Russian artists to welcome the Bolshevik Revolution – and one of only five out of 120 who accepted an invitation to meet the new People's Commissar for Enlightenment, Anatoly Lunacharsky in November 1917. (Among the others were the poets Alexander Blok and Vladimir Mayakovsky.) He joined the Bolshevik Party in 1918, narrowly escaping execution when he was caught on the wrong side of the battle lines during the civil war. He became an official of the Theatre Division (TEO) of the Commissariat of Education and Enlightenment. In 1918–1919, Meyerhold formed an alliance with Olga Kameneva, the head of the Division. Together, they tried to radicalize Russian theatres, effectively nationalizing them under Bolshevik control. Meyerhold came down with tuberculosis in May 1919 and had to leave for the south. In his absence, the head of the Commissariat, Anatoly Lunacharsky, secured Vladimir Lenin's permission to revise government policy in favor of more traditional theatres and dismissed Kameneva in June 1919.

After returning to Moscow, Meyerhold founded his own theatre in 1920, which was known from 1923 as the Meyerhold Theatre until 1938. Meyerhold confronted the principles of theatrical academism, claiming that they are incapable of finding a common language with the new reality. Meyerhold's methods of scenic constructivism and circus-style effects were used in his most successful works of the time. Some of these works included Nikolai Erdman's The Mandate, Mayakovsky's Mystery-Bouffe, Fernand Crommelynck's Le Cocu magnifique (The Magnanimous Cuckold) and Aleksandr Sukhovo-Kobylin's Tarelkin's Death. Mayakovsky collaborated with Meyerhold several times, and was said to have written The Bedbug especially for him; Meyerhold continued to stage Mayakovsky's productions even after the latter's suicide.

=== Acting techniques ===
The actors participating in Meyerhold's productions acted according to the principle of biomechanics (only distantly related to the present scientific use of the term), the system of actor training that was later taught in a special school created by Meyerhold. Meyerhold's acting technique had fundamental principles at odds with the American method actor's conception. While method acting melded the character with the actor's own personal memories to create the character's internal motivation, Meyerhold connected psychological and physiological processes. He had actors focus on learning gestures and movements as a way of expressing emotion physically. Following Konstantin Stanislavski's lead, he said that the emotional state of an actor was inextricably linked to his physical state (and vice versa), and that one could call up emotions in performance by practicing and assuming poses, gestures, and movements. He developed a number of body expressions that his actors would use to portray specific emotions and characters.

=== His influence ===
Meyerhold gave initial boosts to the stage careers of some of the most distinguished comic actors of the USSR, including Sergey Martinson, Igor Ilyinsky and Erast Garin. His landmark production of Nikolai Gogol's The Government Inspector (1926) was described as the following:

Energetic, mischievous, charming Ilyinsky left his post to the nervous, fragile, suddenly freezing, grotesquely anxious Garin. Energy was replaced by trance, the dynamic with the static, happy jesting humour with bitter and glum satire.

Meyerhold also gave a start to his one time assistant of "The Queen of Spades" Matvey Dubrovin, who later created his own theater in Leningrad.

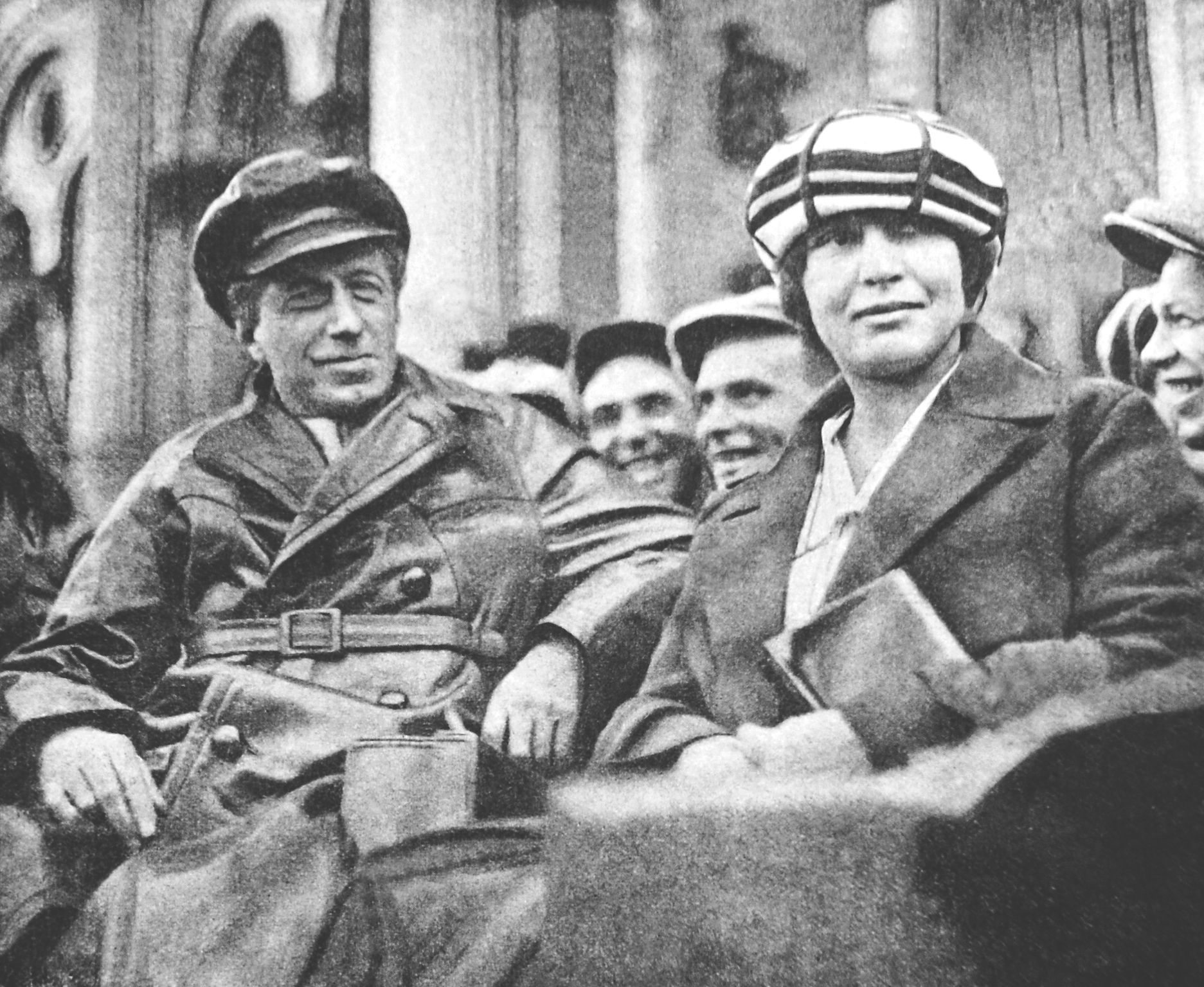
Vsevolod Meyerhold and Zinaida Meyerhold-Reich in Leningrad (St. Petersburg), 1925

In autumn 1921, Meyerhold was appointed head of the State Higher Theatre Workshops, in Moscow, where one of his first students was Sergei Eisenstein, who later wrote

The God-like, incomparable Meyerhold, I beheld him then for the first time and I was to worship him all my life.

But they fell out, apparently because Eisenstein failed to treat the older man with sufficient deference, for which he was, as he put it, "expelled from the Gates of Heaven." In his films, Eisenstein used actors who worked in Meyerhold's tradition. He also cast actors based on what they looked like and their expression, and followed Meyerhold's stylized acting methods. In Strike, for instance, the bourgeois are always obese, drinking, eating, and smoking, whereas the workers are more athletic. For the original production of The Bedbug, in February 1929, Meyerhold hired the young Dmitri Shostakovich as a pianist. Many years later, Shostakovich reputedly recalled: "It's impossible to imagine now how popular Meyerhold was. Everyone knew him, even those who had no interest or connection with the theatre or art. In the circus, clowns always made jokes about Meyerhold. They go for instant laughs in the circus, and they wouldn't sing ditties about people the audience wouldn't recognise immediately. They even used to sell combs called Meyerhold."

=== Repression ===
In the early 1930s, Joseph Stalin launched a campaign to bring Soviet artists to heel, and compel them all to observe the rules of 'socialist realism', which precluded avant-garde art and experimentation, and any art form reckoned to be 'formalist', in that the artist had paid more attention to the form of a work than to its political message. After Shostakovich had been singled out as being guilty of 'formalism', in January 1936, Meyerhold evidently surmised that he would soon be a target, and in March delivered a talk entitled "Meyer Against Meyerholdism" in which he said – reportedly to 'thunderous applause' – that "the path to simplicity is not an easy one. Each artist goes at his own pace, and they must not lose their distinctive way of walking... Soviet subject matter is often a smoke screen to conceal mediocrity." A year later, in April 1937, his wife, the actress Zinaida Reich, wrote Stalin a long letter alleging that her husband was the victim of a conspiracy by Trotskyists and former members of the disbanded Russian Association of Proletarian Writers. The letter was not answered. In December 1937, Lazar Kaganovich, a close associate of Stalin, went to a production at the Meyerhold Theatre, and walked out in disgust. The theatre was closed, by order of the Politburo, on 7 January 1938, on the grounds that 'throughout its entire existence, the Meyerhold Theatre has been unable to free itself from thoroughly bourgeois Formalist positions', his works were proclaimed antagonistic and alien to the Soviet people.

=== Arrest and death ===
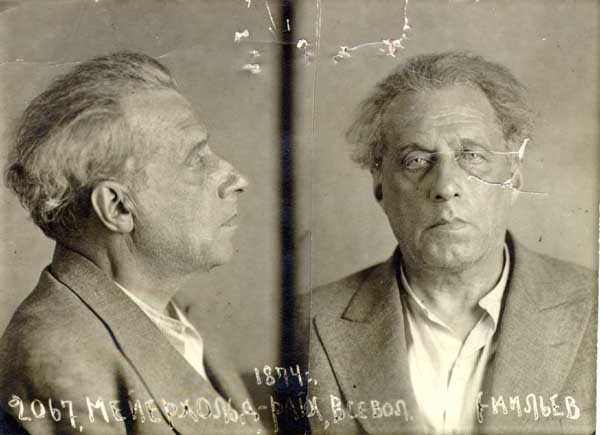
Meyerhold's mugshot, taken at the time of his arrest by Soviet police

The ailing Stanislavsky, who was the director of an opera theatre now known as Stanislavski and Nemirovich-Danchenko Theatre, invited Meyerhold to be his assistant – an invitation that surprised many in Moscow, given their long standing artistic differences. Stanislavsky died soon afterwards, in August 1938. His dying wish was "Take care of Meyerhold; he is my sole heir in the theatre – here or anywhere else." Meyerhold directed his theatre for nearly a year, and was engaged with producing the première of Sergei Prokofiev's Semyon Kotko, when he was instructed that he was to choreograph a spectacle in Leningrad involving 30,000 athletes. On 15 June 1939, he addressed a conference of theatre directors, in the presence of Andrey Vyshinsky, the state prosecutor who had presided over the infamous Moscow show trials. His speech was not reported in the Soviet press, giving rise to a report that he had declared, defiantly:

If what you have been doing with the Soviet theatre recently is what you call anti-formalism, if you consider what is now taking place on the stages of the best theatres in Moscow as an achievement of the Soviet theatre, then I would prefer to be what you consider a formalist... in hunting formalism, you have eliminated art.

This is from a version of the speech written up later by the emigre musician Yuri Yelagin, from notes he said that he made at the conference – but its accuracy is disputed. After the speech, he returned to Leningrad, and was arrested on arrival on 20 June 1939. Shortly afterwards, intruders broke into his flat and repeatedly stabbed his wife, Zinaida Reich, who died from her injuries. Taken to NKVD headquarters in Moscow, and placed in the hands of the notorious torturer Lev Shvartzman, Meyerhold broke down and confessed to being a British and Japanese spy. In his final days, he wrote a letter to the head of the Soviet government Vyacheslav Molotov, which was retained in police files, where it was discovered after the dissolution of the USSR by the journalist Vitaly Shentalinsky. In it, he wrote:

The investigators began to use force on me, a sick 65-year-old man. I was made to lie face down and beaten on the soles of my feet and my spine with a rubber strap. They sat me on a chair and beat my feet from above, with considerable force... For the next few days, when those parts of my legs were covered with extensive internal hemorrhaging, they again beat the red-blue-and-yellow bruises with the strap and the pain was so intense that it felt as if boiling water was being poured on these sensitive areas. I howled and wept from the pain. They beat my back with the same rubber strap and punched my face, swinging their fists from a great height ... The intolerable physical and emotional pain caused my eyes to weep unending streams of tears. Lying face down on the floor, I discovered that I could wriggle, twist and squeal like a dog when its master whips it ... When I lay down on the cot and fell asleep, after 18 hours of interrogation, in order to go back in an hour's time for more, I was woken up by my own groaning and because I was jerking about like a patient in the last stages of typhoid fever ... "death, oh most certainly, death is easier than this!" the interrogated person says to himself. I began to incriminate myself in the hope that this, at least, would lead quickly to the scaffold.

He was sentenced to death by firing squad on 1 February 1940, and executed the next day. The Soviet Supreme Court cleared him of all charges in 1955, during the first wave of de-Stalinization.

== Marriage and family ==
Meyerhold married his first wife, Olga Munt, in 1896 and together they had three daughters. He later met the actress Zinaida Reich when she began studying with him. They fell in love and he divorced his wife; Reich was already divorced and had two children of her own. They married in 1922 or 1924.

== Bibliography ==
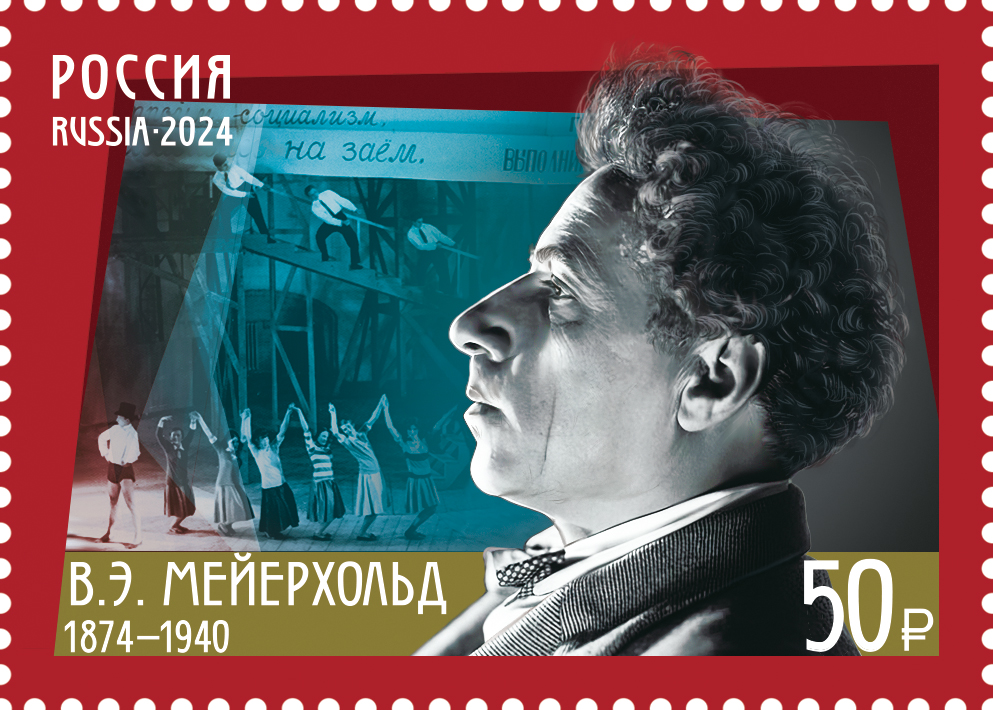
Meyerhold on a 2024 stamp of Russia

=== Texts by Meyerhold ===
- Meyerhold on Theatre, trans. and ed. by Edward Braun, with a critical commentary, 1969. London: Methuen and New York: Hill and Wang.
- Meyerhold Speaks/Meyerhold Rehearses (Russian Theatre Archive), by V. Meyerhold, Alexander Gladkov (ed.) and Alma Law (ed.), Routledge, 1996
- Meyerhold at Work, Paul Schmidt (ed.), Applause Theatre Book Publishers, 1996
- Lecciones de Dirección Escénica 2010
- Le Theatre Theatral 2008

=== Works on Meyerhold ===
- Vsevolod Meyerhold (Routledge Performance Practitioners Series), by Jonathan Pitches, Routledge, 2003
- Meyerhold: The art of conscious theater, by Marjorie L. Hoover, University of Massachusetts Press, 1974 (biography)
- Vsevolod Meyerhold (Directors in Perspective Series), by Robert Leach, Christopher Innes (ed.), Cambridge University Press, 1993
- Meyerhold's Theatre of the Grotesque: Post-revolutionary Productions, 1920–32, James M. Symons, 1971
- Meyerhold: A Revolution in Theatre, by Edward Braun, University of Iowa Press, 1998
- The Theatre of Meyerhold: Revolution and the Modern Stage by Edward Braun, 1995
- Stanislavsky and Meyerhold (Stage and Screen Studies, v. 3), by Robert Leach, Peter Lang, 2003
- Meyerhold the Director, by Konstantin Rudnitsky, Ardis, 1981
- Meyerhold, Eisenstein and Biomechanics: Actor Training in Revolutionary Russia by Alma H. Law, Mel Gordon, McFarland & co, 1995
- The Death of Meyerhold A play by Mark Jackson, premiered at The Shotgun Players, Berkeley, CA, December 2003.
- The Theater of Meyerhold and Brecht, by Katherine B. Eaton, Greenwood Press,1985
- Meyerhold and the Music Theater, by Isaak Glikman, 'Soviet Composer', Leningrad, 1989
- Vsevolod Meyerhold Annotated Bibliography, by David Roy, LTScotland, 2002
- Stanislavsky in Practice: Actor Training in Post-Soviet Russia (Artists & Issues in the Theatre, Vol. 16) by Vreneli Farber, Peter Lang, 2008 (Meyerhold's ideas applied in post-Soviet actor training)

== See also ==
- Vsevolod Meyerhold State Theatre
- Nikolay Okhlopkov
- Michael Chekhov
- Yevgeny Vakhtangov
- Sergei Mikhailovich Tretyakov
- Andrei Droznin
- Center of Theatrical Arts «House of Meyerhold» at Penza
