= Andrei Droznin =

Andrei Droznin (Russian: Андрей Борисович Дрознин) is a Russian theatre director and movement coach. He is perhaps best known for his stage movement technique that has become an essential part of theatre training programs throughout the world .

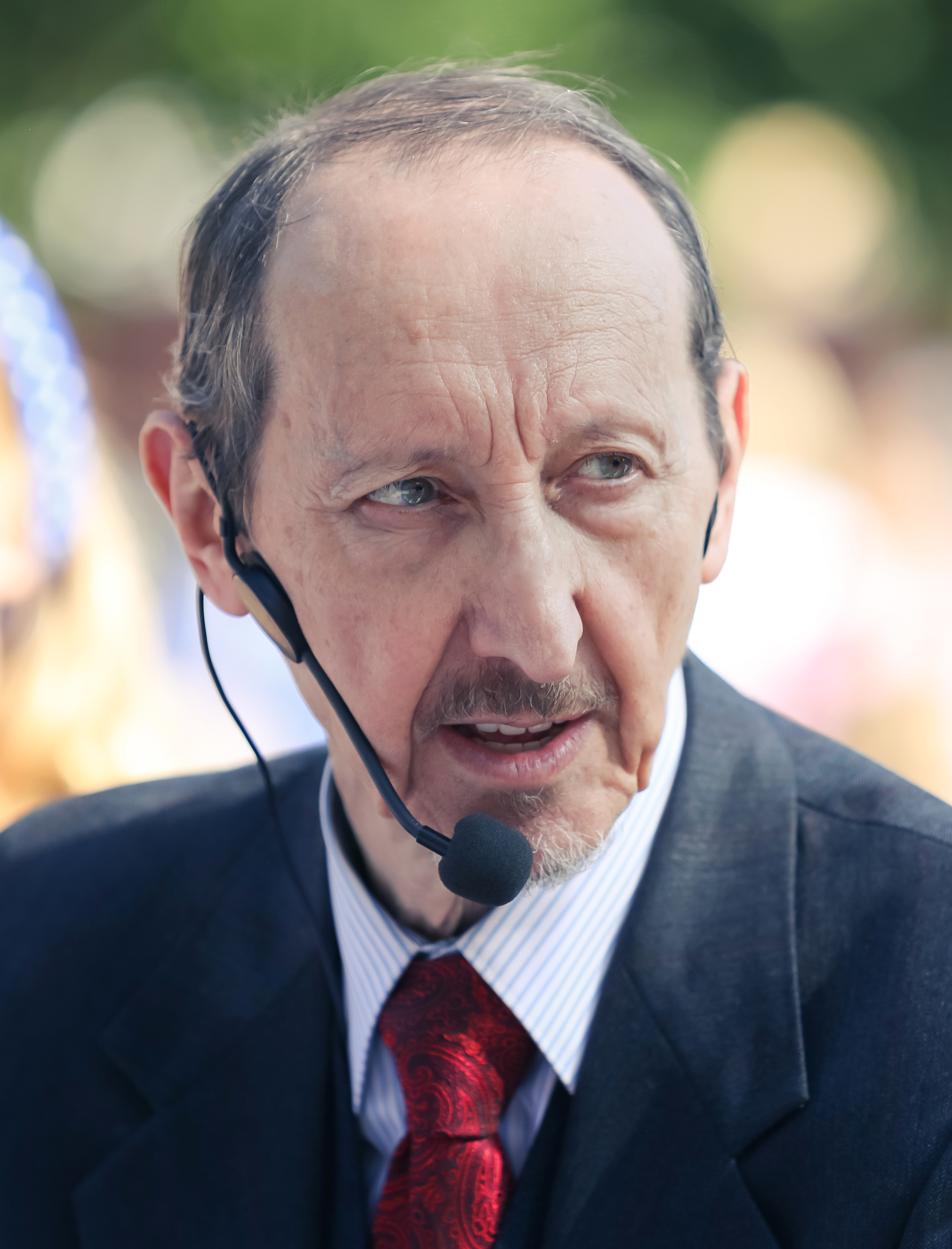
Andrei Droznin, 2019

== Career ==
Andrei Droznin started his career in theatre in the 1960s. He was among the founding members of the Tabakov Studio in Moscow, the Stanislavsky Summer School in Cambridge, Massachusetts and is the founding member of the International Stage Movement Center.

Droznin has directed movement in more than 160 theatre productions and movies worldwide and has taught, directed and conducted seminars in dozens of countries. Mr. Droznin is the only Russian member of the Grotowski Council in Wroclav, Poland. He is the Master Teacher of Movement at the Vakhtangov Theatre.

In 1998, Mr. Droznin received the title of the Distinguished Artsmaker of Russia.

== Droznin Method ==
Droznin is perhaps best known for his unique system of training that combines Vsevolod Meyerhold's biomechanics and Stanislavski's 'system'.

Droznin's method incorporates a large amount of difficult movements and exercises. Droznin has stated that the goal of his work is not to simply teach students "stage tricks" but "to make connection between body and mind, body and soul, so when they feel something, they will immediately express themselves." .

Droznin has also described his method as "living movement" which is "stage movement that blurs the boundaries between dance, mime, and vernacular gesture," which in turn allows the audience to identify with the performance on a much stronger arm .
