= Nikolai Chayev =

Russian writer, poet, and playwright (1824 – 1914)

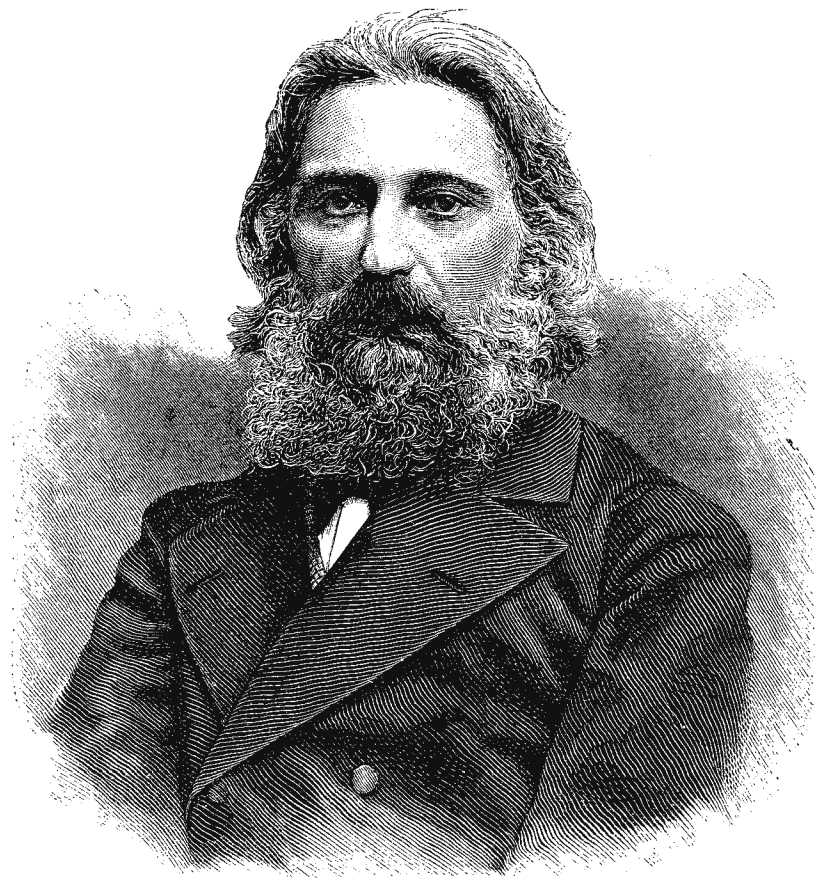
- Chayev in 1885
- Born: Николай Александрович Чаев; May 8, 1824; Kostroma Governorate, Imperial Russia
- Died: November 16, 1914 (aged 90); Saint Petersburg, Imperial Russia
- Occupations: writer, poet, playwright
- Years active: 1859-1914
- Awards: Griboyedov Prize (1883)

Nikolai Alexandrovich Chayev (Russian: Николай Александрович Чаев; 8 May 1824 – 16 November 1914) was a Russian writer, poet, and playwright.

Chayev was born in Kostroma Governorate, Imperial Russia. A Moscow University graduate who for several years was the chief supervisor of the Kremlin Armoury, he made his debut in print in 1859, originally as a fiction writer. He then turned to drama, choosing the early Russian history as his theme, and had his best-known work produced at the Alexandrinsky Theatre in Saint Petersburg (Svat Faddeyich, Сват Фаддеич, 1864; Dimitry Samozvanets, Димитрий Самозванец, The False Dmitry, 1866), and Maly Theatre in Moscow (Svekrov, Свекровь, Mother-in-law, 1867; Znai nashikh, Знай наших, That's Us, 1876). His play The Tsar and the Great Prince of Russia, Vasily Ivanovich Shuysky was produced by the Korsh Theatre in 1883 and earned him the Griboyedov Prize of that year. He also authored two novels on the times of Pavel I (Podspudnye sily, Подспудные силы, Hidden Forces, and Bogatyri, Богатыри), as well as the poem Nadya (Надя).

Chayev was a co-founder in 1874 of the Society of Russian Dramatists and Opera Composers (Общество русских драматических писателей и оперных композиторов) and served as its chairman for a while. After Alexander Ostrovsky's death he succeeded him as the head of the Repetroire committee for the Moscow Theatres. He died in Petrograd.
