= Polina Strepetova =

Russian actress (1850–1903)

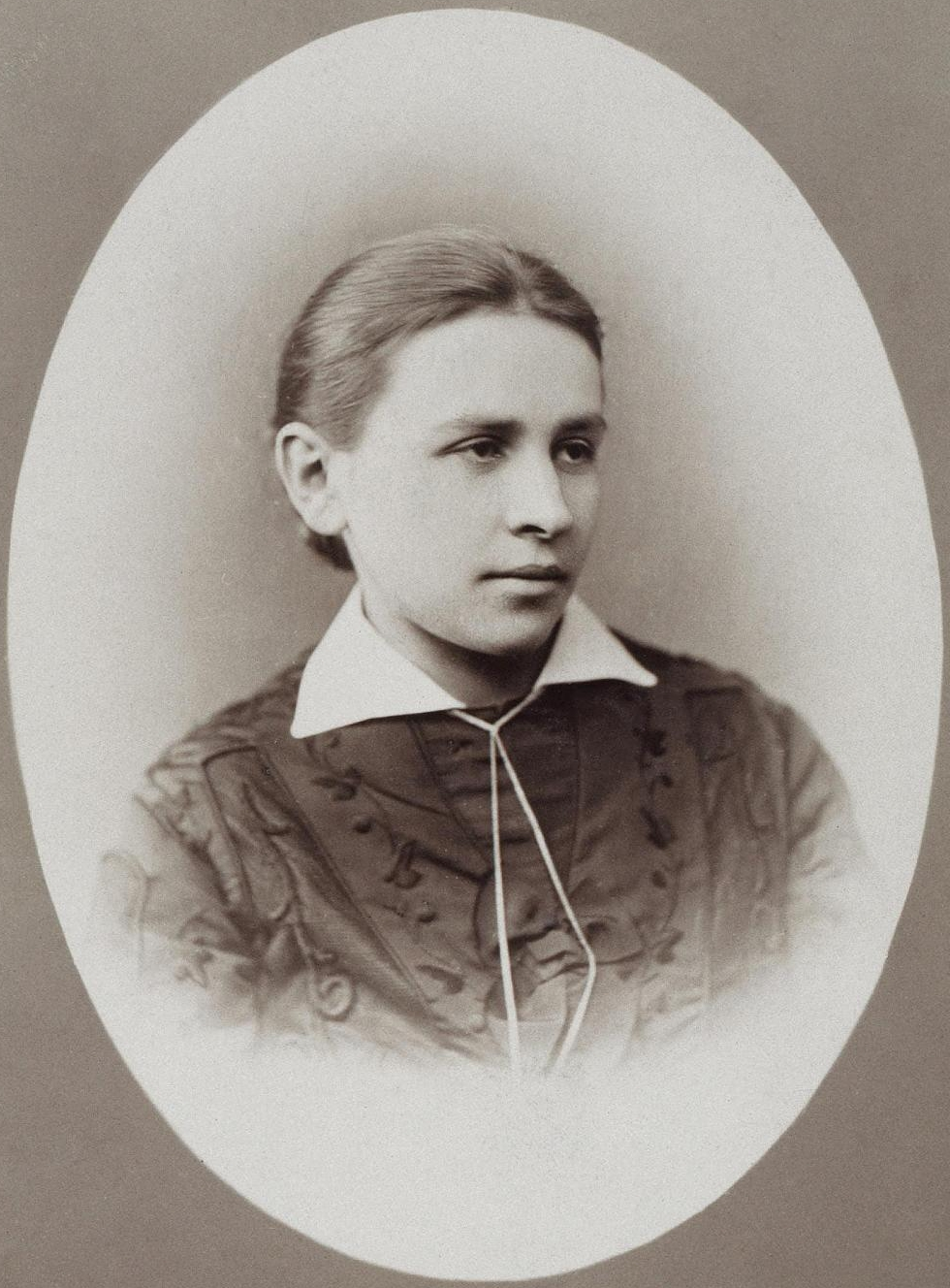
- Born: 17 October 1850; Nizhny Novgorod, Russian Empire
- Died: 17 October 1903 (aged 53); Saint Petersburg, Russian Empire
- Occupation: stage actress
- Years active: 1865-1897
- Spouse: Modest Pisarev

Polina (Pelageya) Antipyevna Strepetova (Russian: Поли́на (Пелаге́я) Анти́пьевна Стре́петова; 17 October 1850 – 17 October 1903) was a Russian stage actress, renowned for her tragic parts, who provided a deep and expressive portrayal of "a suffering, protesting Russian woman."

== Biography ==
Born in Nizhny Novgorod, she was a foundling, raised and brought up by a city theatre barber Antip Grigoryevich Strepetov, who'd literally found the infant at his own doorstep. She's never been able to establish her biological parents' identities and accepted the day she'd been found as her birthday. Her foster mother Elizaveta Ivanovna was an amateur actress and singer who worked at the popular Shepelev Theatre, and from an early age Polina made up her mind that she'd follow her footsteps.

Strepetova started to perform at the Nizhny City theatre from age seven and was recognized as an exceptionally gifted child, but failed to receive any formal education. She made her major debut in 1865 on stage the Rybinsk Theatre and in the course of the next three years undertook more than one hundred parts, moving from one provincial city theatre to another: from Rybinsk to Yaroslavl, then Simbirsk, Murom, Novgorod, Samara, Oryol and Kazan.

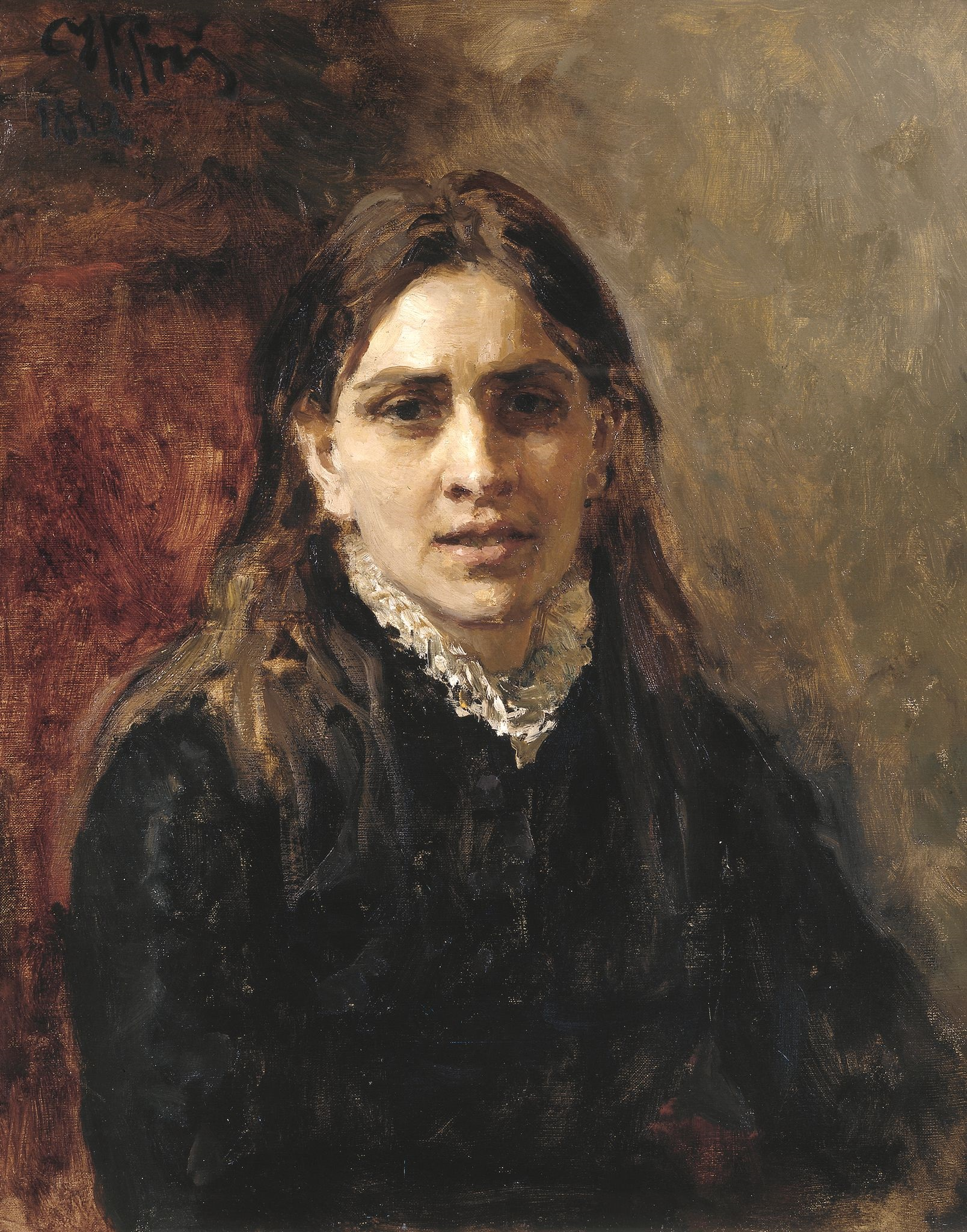
1882 portrait by Repin

She enjoyed her first success in Yaroslavl, as Lizaveta in A Bitter Fate by Alexey Pisemsky, then repeated this triumph in Samara, aged nineteen. Exceptionally well received here were also her performances as Verochka in A Child by Pyotr Boborykin and Sofia in All Will Be Well, by Ivan Samarin. Total lack of education at that stage apparently did not bother Strepetova: she was learning fast, from her better-known colleagues, mostly Lyubov Nikulina-Kositskaya and Alexandra Schubert, as well as Modest Pisarev, her future husband. It was only in the 1880s that it became obvious that Strepetova's artistic palette was limited, and her inability to develop it or adapt to the changing public tastes started to undermine her reputation of a great actress.

Strepetova's success story continued in Kazan, where in 1871 she starred as Marya Andreyevna in The Poor Bride, by Alexander Ostrovsky, as well as Anneta in The Family Schemes, by Nikolai Kulikov. The latter (taken in its development over the years) came later to be regarded as her most profound achievement on stage, next to Lizaveta, which continued to be her trademark part for thirty years. Her other notable roles of the time were Liza (Woe from Wit, Alexander Griboyedov), Dunya (Stay in Your Own Sled) and Katerina (The Storm), both by Alexander Ostrovsky.

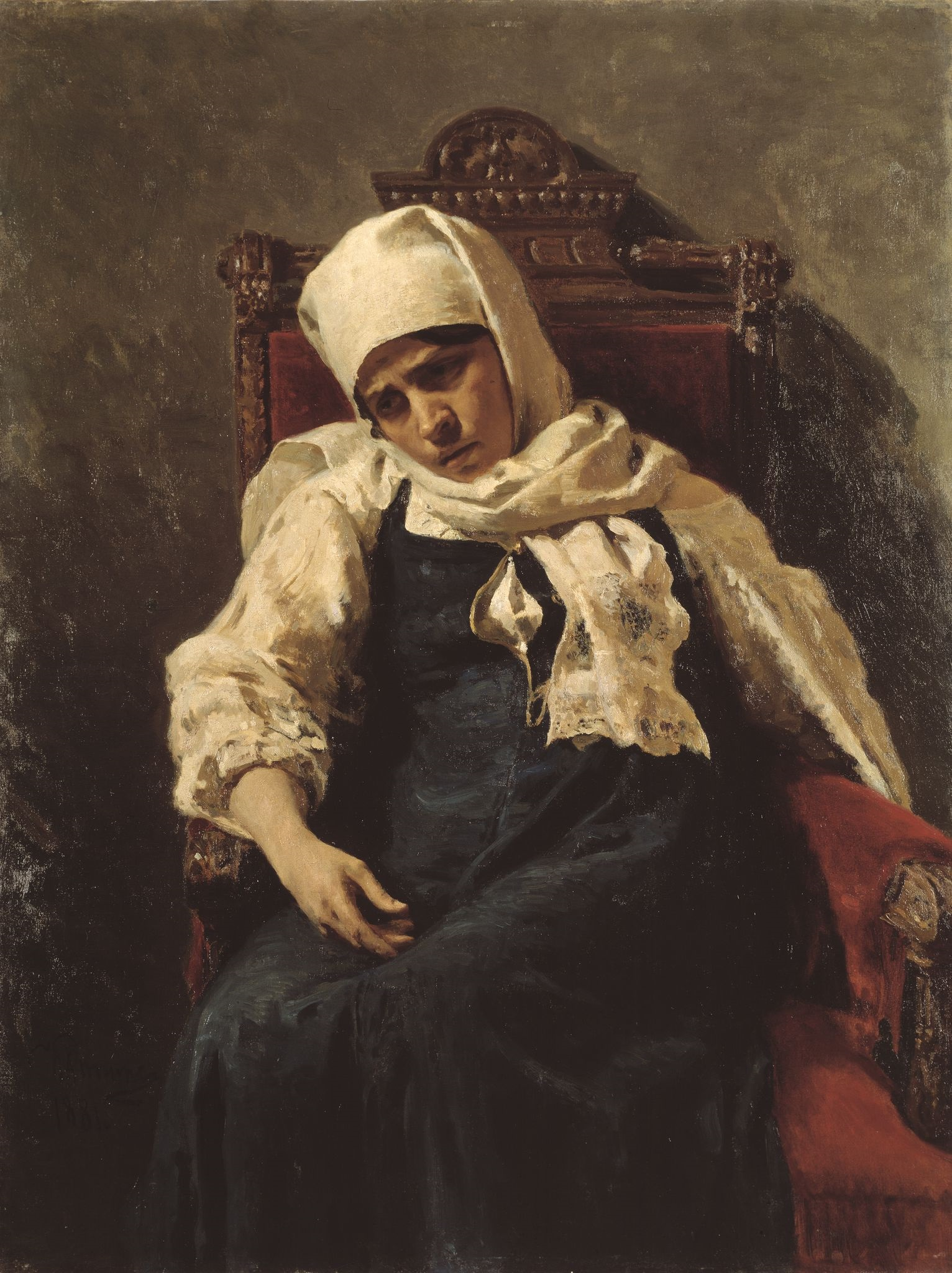
Strepetova as Lizaveta. 1881 portrait by Repin

In 1873 Strepetova started to enjoy her first triumphs in Moscow where she joined the Moscow Public Theatre, ran by Urusov and Taneyev. Later, in 1880, she had a stint with Anna Brenko's Pushkin Theatre where she became the prima to a very strong troupe, but had to leave for Petersburg after the theatre went bust. Before that she became hugely popular with the Moscow artistic and literary elite, Ivan Turgenev, Vladimir Nemirovich-Danchenko and Pyotr Chaykovsky counting themselves among the admirers of her talent. The portraits of her were painted by Ilya Repin, Viktor Vasnetsov and Nikolai Yaroshenko. The journalist, editor and memoirist Alexandra Jacobi became a friend, and later published memoirs on Strepetova.

In 1876 she appeared on stage the Alexandrinsky Theatre for the first time, as Lizaveta again, but was invited to the troupe only five years later. Her nine year stay at the leading Imperial theatre was marred by conflicts with her more successful and versatile rival Maria Savina, petty scandals regarding wages and much intrigue on the parts of both her detractors and followers. Besides, her passionate, overemotional manner of playing was considered provincial and old-fashioned among the Petersburg theatrical society. She had more than thirty parts in Alexandrinka between 1881 and 1890, but of the 22 new ones only three were later recognized as consistent with the level of her scenic gift: Kruchinina (Guilty Without Fault, Ostrovsky), Stepanida (Close to the Money, Viktor Krylov) and Sarra (Ivanov, Anton Chekhov).

In 1886 Ostrovsky, who invariably supported Strepetova in her feuds with the theatre administration, died. Unpopular with the troupe, she found herself in isolation, and in 1890 had to leave Alexandrinka. Her final success was Matryona in Lev Tolstoy's Power of Darkness, at the Literature and Art Circle theatre, in 1895. Strepetova spent the last years of her life in Petersburg, where in 1896-1897 she played at the Maly Suvorinsky Theatre and later worked on a book of memoirs called Minuvshiye dni (Минувшие дни, Days Long Gone), which remained unfinished.

Strepetova died in Saint Petersburg on 17 October 1903, of stomach cancer, and was interred in the Nikolskoe Cemetery. In 1936 her ashes were relocated to the Masters of Arts Necropolis.
