= Nina Annenkova-Bernár =

Ánna Pávlovna Bernárd
- Born: c. 1862
- Died: 1933; Orenberg
- Occupations: actress, playwright and writer
- Writing career
- Pen name: Nina Pávlovna Annenkova-Bernár

Nina Pávlovna Annenkova-Bernár (Russian: Нина Павловна Анненкова-Бернар, born Ánna Pávlovna Bernárd, 1862? – 1933) was a Russian actress, playwright and writer.

== Life ==
Annenkova-Bernár was born in between 1859 and 1865. She studied in a Saint Petersburg's Mariinskaya Gymnasium, later trained as an actress and obtained her first acting work in the provinces in 1880. Eventually she took a place at a Moscow Goreva's theatre where her skills were appreciated.

She took to writing whilst she was living with Modest Pisarev. He was an actor involved with running Anna Brenko's theatre in 1880. Her lover's influence was useful in obtaining contacts in the publishing world. It was alleged that he was an unattributed co-author because he was involved in strong editing of her work.

In 1903 she appeared in her own play about Joan of Arc, Doch Naroda (People's Daughter, published the same year), staged by the St Petersburg's Maly Theatre.

This was the most successful of her plays. In 1917 she retired to Orenberg where she continued to write but she mainly ran a theatre for young actors.

She died in 1933 in Orenburg.
