= Nikolai Shklyar =

Nikolai Sklyar
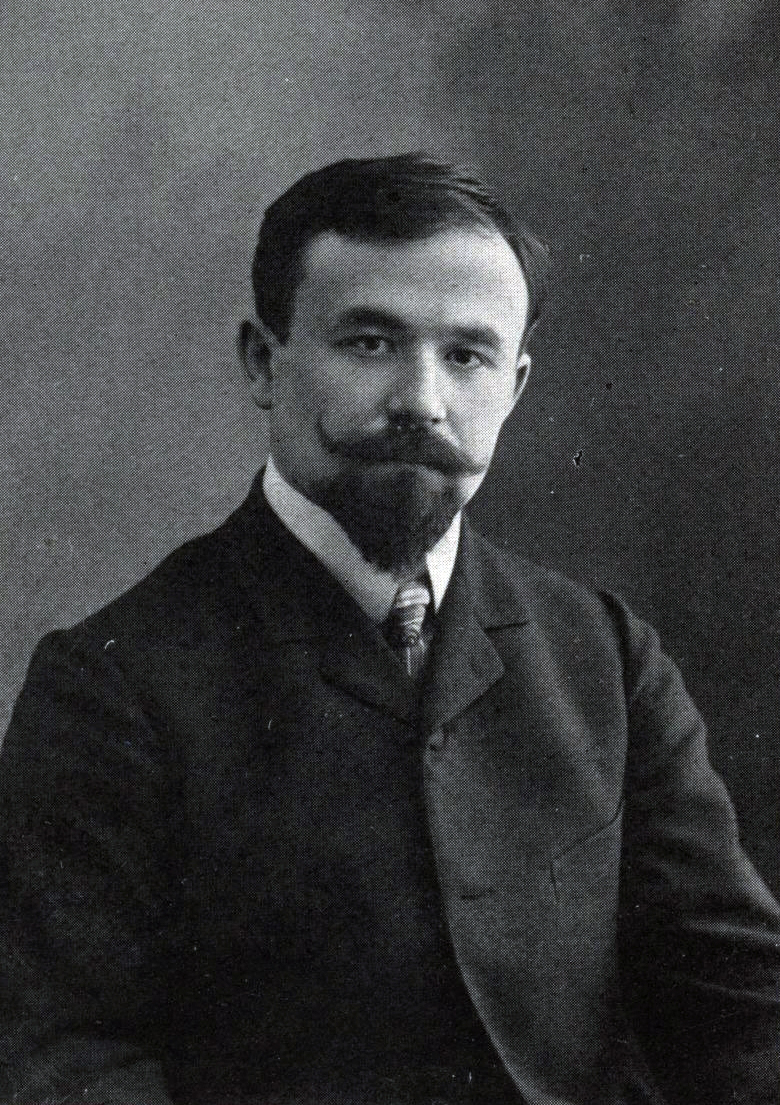
- In 1909
- Born: Nikolai Grigoryevich Shklyar; Николай Григорьевич Шкляр; 14 April 1878; Mogilyov, Imperial Russia
- Died: 23 January 1952 (aged 73); Moscow, USSR
- Occupations: writer, playwright
- Spouse: Ekaterina Krylova

Nikolai Grigoryevich Shklyar (Russian: Николай Григорьевич Шкляр, 14 April 1878 — 23 January 1952) was a Russian, Soviet children's writer and playwright.

Born in Mogilyov to a railroad engineer, Shklyar graduated from Moscow University as a lawyer and worked for the Moscow Commercial court till 1906. He developed strong interest in children's literature and became an active member of the Sreda literary group, where he was closely associated with Maxim Gorky, Alexander Kuprin and Ivan Bunin, among others. He became friends with Bunin and continued to correspond with him long after he'd left Russia for France.

Shklyar's play for children The Tale of Bonny Prince Albert (Сказка о прекрасном короле Альберте) earned him the Griboyedov Prize in 1914. Music for another play of his, Soap Bubbles (Мыльные пузыри), produced by Nikolai Sinelnikov for the Kharkov Russian Drama Theatre in 1922 was written by the then totally unknown Isaak Dunayevsky. His later works included the short story collections Sacred Place (Заповедное место, 1931), Black Lake (Чёрное озеро, 1934) and Land of Youth (Страна молодежи, 1934). In 1950 his 1929 novella Light (Свет) was banned for the use of "counter-revolutionary chastushkas".

Shklyar died on 23 January 1952 and is interred in Novodevichye Cemetery. The re-newed interest in his legacy led to staging of the play Bum and Youla in 2006 in Samara (originally directed by Sophia Khalyutina in 1918) and the reissue of some of his best-known work in 2011.
