= Korsh Theatre =

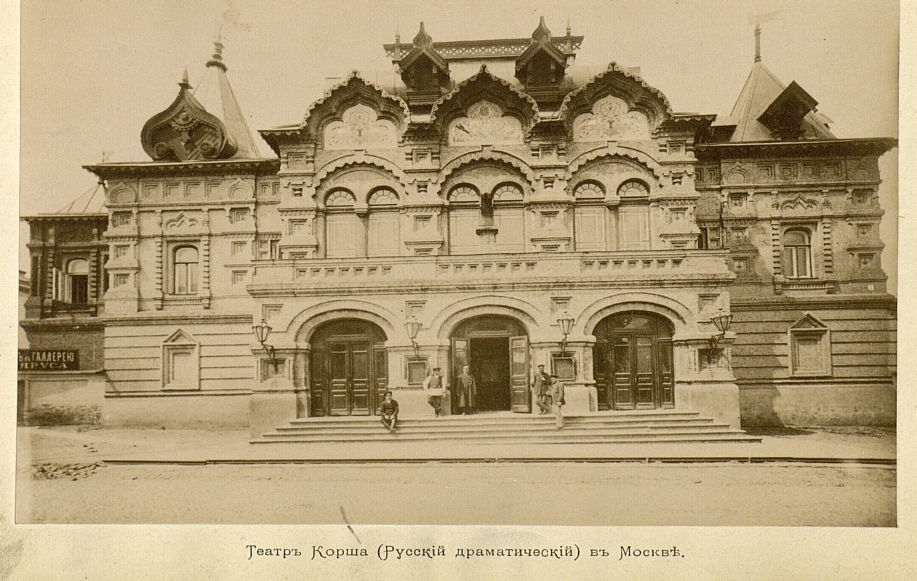
- Interactive map of Korsh Theatre
- Address: Petrovsky Lane, 3 Moscow; Russia
- Coordinates: 55°45′57.582″N 37°26′46.728″E
- Owner: Fyodor Korsh
- Type: Drama theatre

Construction
- Opened: 1882
- Closed: 1917

The Russian Drama Korsh Theatre (Russian: Русский драматический театр Корша), commonly known as the Korsh Theatre, was a theatre which functioned in Moscow, Imperial Russia from 1882 until 1917. It was named after its founder, entrepreneur Fyodor Korsh.

After the 1917 Revolution it carried on for several years under different guises, known variously as the Union of Artists, The Third RSFSR Theatre, The Comedy Theatre (Former Korsh), and finally the Moscow Drama Theatre, before being finally shut down in 1933. The building, situated on Petrovsky Lane, is now occupied by the Theatre of Nations.

== History ==
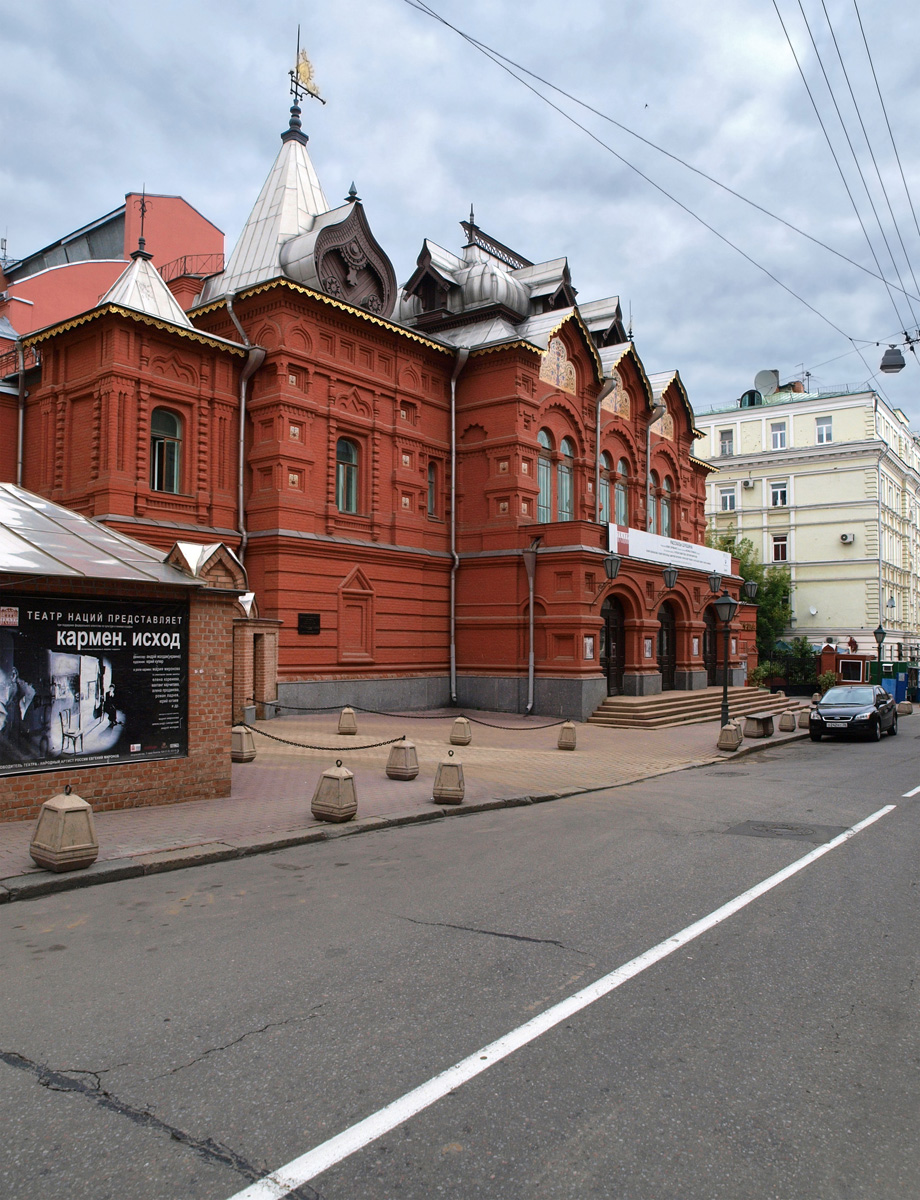
Theatre of Nations, former Korsh Theatre, at Petrovsky Lane 3

The theatre was co-founded by the entrepreneur Fyodor Korsh and the actors Modest Pisarev and Vasily Andreyev-Burlak on the basis of the Anna Brenko's Pushkin Theatre, which had gone bankrupt in 1881. In 1883 Korsh (who had received substantial financial help from the industrialist and patron of arts Alexander Bakhrushin) became its sole owner. Its earliest productions included Revizor by Nikolai Gogol, The Forest by Alexander Ostrovsky and Masquerade by Mikhail Lermontov.

The building, designed by architect Mikhail Chichagov, had many features of modern technology, including being lit by electricity, which was new at the time. Korsh's was the first totally electrified Moscow theatre in the days when even the Bolshoi and Maly Theatres relied mostly on gas lamps.

The Korsh Theatre opened officially on 30 August 1885 and a year later staged its first major hit, Alexander Griboyedov's Woe from Wit. Experimenting with technical stage effects, it soon acquired the reputation of being the most technically advanced theatre in Russia.

Initially, "cheap" comedies and vaudevilles (by Arkady Kryukovskoy, Dmitry Mansfeld, and Ivan Baryshev among others) dominated the theatre's repertoire, but it was on their commercial success that the Korsh Theatre built its financial independence and started producing serious work, including plays by Henrik Ibsen, Hermann Sudermann and Edmond Rostand.

The Moscow premier of Leo Tolstoy's The Power of Darkness was staged at the Korsh's on 19 October 1895. It was at this theatre that Chekhov the playwright debuted, after his play Ivanov had been commissioned by Korsh personally in 1887. Later the theatre produced two more plays by Chekhov, The Bear (1888) and The Marriage (1902).

Each Friday the theatre presented a premiere. Almost invariably a half-baked production staged through three or four rehearsals, they bore the atmosphere of improvisation and attracted huge public interest regardless of the quality. The majority of such pieces were being dropped never to be returned to; some, like Charms of Love by Evtikhy Karpov or Summer Dreams by Viktor Krylov have lasted for years.

Korsh with his assistants regularly attended the 'hottest' premieres at the leading European (mostly French) theatres. Each time they would shorthand the play's text sitting in the audience, translate it almost on the spot and rush back to Moscow to stage a play which hasn't yet even been published back home. In the early 1890s it was the first to produce such popular European plays as Charley's Aunt by Brandon Thomas, M-me Sans-Gêne by Victorien Sardou, Business is Business by Octave Mirbeau, and Le Contrôleur des wagons-lits by Alexandre Bisson.

The emergence in 1898 of the serious rival in the face of the Moscow Art Theatre led by Konstantin Stanislavski, worried Korsh into inviting the stage director Nikolai Sinelnikov who brought with him several aspiring talents (among them Leonid Leonidov, Alexander Ostuzhev, Maria Tamarina-Blumental, Nikolai Radin) and staged some lauded productions, including Cyrano de Bergerac by Rostand, The Tempest by Shakespeare and Vanyushin's Children by Sergey Naydyonov. Some of them were highly successful (and Vanyushkin's Children received high praise from Stanislavski) but the theatre never succeeded in trying to regain its position as the leading force on the Russian theatrical scene.

From 1917 onwards the former Korsh Theatre was in the constant turmoil of reorganisations. It was known consequentially as the Union of Artists, The Third RSFSR Theatre, The Comedy Theatre (Former Korsh) and finally the Moscow Drama Theatre, before being disbanded in 1933. Its director Karpov was arrested and prosecuted, and part of the troupe moved to the Moscow Art Theatre.

Nowadays the house on Petrovsky Lane, 3 belongs to the Theatre of Nations. It claims to follow the traditions set by its predecessor and stages occasional memorial events commemorating its history.
