= Brenko =

Brenko is a given name and surname. Notable people with the name include:

- Brenko Lee (born 1995), Tonga international rugby league footballer
- Anna Brenko (1848–1934), Russian stage actress
