= Pyotr Nevezhin =

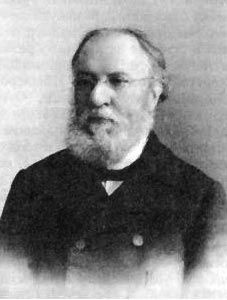
- Born: Pyotr Mikhaylovich Nevezhin; Петр Михайлович Невежин; 9 July 1841; Smolensk, Russian Empire
- Died: 25 May 1919 (aged 77); Petrograd, Soviet Russia
- Occupation: Playwright
- Writing career
- Period: 1880-1917
- Genre: Comedy • Drama
- Notable works: Second Youth; Childhood Friend

Pyotr Mikhaylovich Nevezhin (Russian: Пётр Михайлович Невежин, 9 July 1841 — 25 May 1919) was a Russian dramatist and short story writer.

== Biography ==
Nevezhin was born in Smolensk to a local landlord. He graduated the First Moscow Cadet Corps, served for several years as an army officer and was briefly engaged in the Russo-Turkish War.

His first two comedies, comedy, Blazh (Блажь, A Whim, 1880), and Staroye po-novomu (Old Things in New Ways, 1882), both written in collaboration with Alexander Ostrovsky, were successfully staged by the Moscow Maly Theatre and St Petersburg's Alexandrinka.

Of about thirty of Nevezhin's own plays the most popular one was the drama Vtoraya molodost (Second Youth, 1888), for which he received his second Griboyedov Prize. His first one went to Childhood Friend, in 1886.

The Complete Works by Pyotr Nevezhin in ten volumes came out in 1898-1901, via the Prosvescheniye Publishers. His acclaimed Memoires on Ostrovsky (Воспоминания об Островском) were published by Teatr i Iskusstvo (1906) and The Imperial Theatres Yearbook (1909 and 1910).

Nevezhin died in 1919 in Petrograd and is interred in the Volkovo Cemetery.

== Legacy ==
Generally, Nevezhin's legacy is regarded as an attempt to continue the traditions set by Ostrovsky well into the 20th century, with total disregard for the new, modernist trends or the Ibsen school of psychological drama. Both his plays and numerous short stories (most of which dealt with the everyday life of Russian army officers, which he knew well) have been described as didactic, naïve and overly sentimental, but his readership never waned, and his best plays enjoyed stable popularity during his lifetime.
