= The Philistines =

Play by Maxim Gorky written in 1901

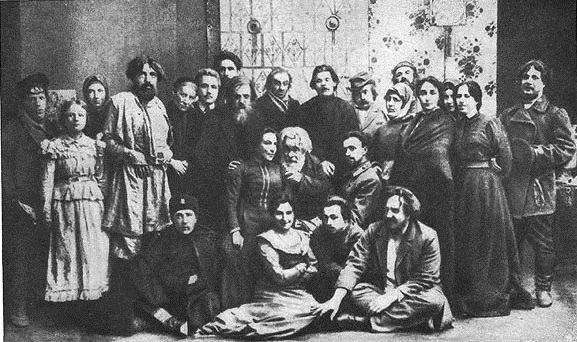
- Gorky at the Moscow Art Theatre with the cast, 1902
- Original language: Russian
- Written by: Maxim Gorky
- Genre: Realistic drama
- Setting: Bessemenov's house in Moscow, early 1900s

Premiere
- Date: 26 March 1902
- Place: Moscow Art Theatre

The Philistines (Russian: Мещане, romanized: Meshchane) is the debut play by Maxim Gorky written in 1901. It was first published by Znaniye in 1902, subtitled: "The Scenes in the House of Bessemenov. The Drama sketch in 4 Acts".

The play premiered on 26 March 1902 at the Moscow Art Theatre, directed by Konstantin Stanislavski and Vasily Luzhsky, the latter taking the leading part of Bessemenov. The production enjoyed astounding success, even though every phrase considered 'too risky' had been cut out by the censors.

In the course of its first year 60 thousand copies of The Philistines were sold. In 1903 it was awarded the Griboyedov Prize.
