= Vasily Velichko =

Russian Imperial politician

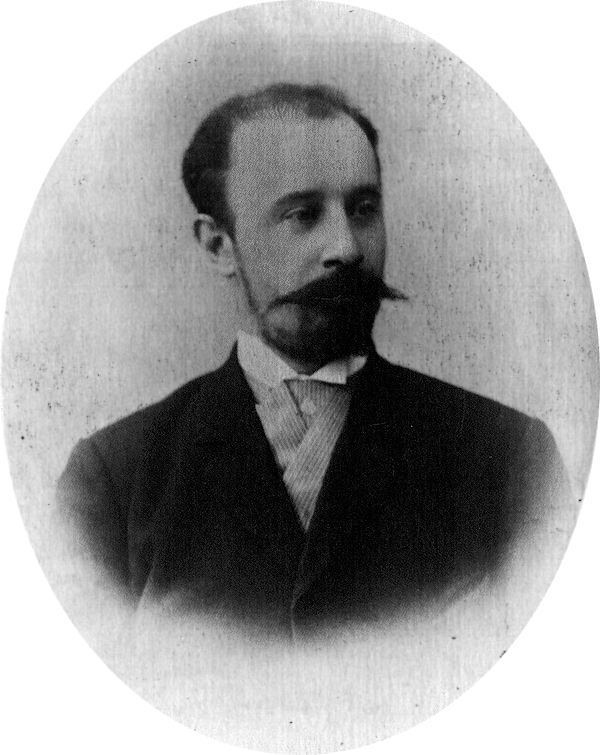
- Born: Vasily Lvovich Velichko; Василий Львович Величко; July 14, 1860; Priluki, Poltava Governorate, Russian Empire (now Pryluky, Poltava Oblast, Ukraine)
- Died: January 13, 1904 (aged 43); St Petersburg, Russian Empire
- Occupations: dramatist, poet, editor, theatre critic, publicist, political activist
- Years active: 1880−1904
- Awards: Griboyedov Prize (1894)

Vasily Lvovich Velichko (Russian: Васи́лий Льво́вич Вели́чко; 14 July 1860, in Priluki, Poltava Governorate, Russian Empire (now Pryluky, Poltava Oblast, Ukraine) – 13 January 1904, in Saint Petersburg) was a Russian Imperial politician, who served in the Ministry of Justice of the Russian Empire. He was also a poet, playwright and publicist, one of the leaders of Russian Assembly, and editor of the semi-official Kavkaz gazette.

Known as a Russian chauvinist, he demonstrated blatant intolerance to the Armenian people and tried to set them on other populations in the Caucasus. He was active during the period when the Imperial Russian authorities carried out a purposeful anti-Armenian policy.

According to the Russian historian Victor Schnirelmann, "it is curious that his works were re-published in Azerbaijan in the early 1990s and received wide popularity there". Velichko's "forgotten racist tract" was reissued by Ziya Bunyadov's academy.
