= Evgeny Goslavsky =

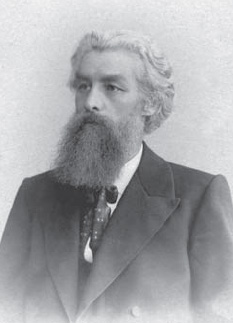
- Born: Evgeny Petrovich Goslavsky; Евгений Петрович Гославский; 30 April 1861; Ostro-Plastikovo, Ryazan Governorate, Imperial Russia
- Died: 15 December 1917 (aged 56); Staraya Mayna, Simbirsk Governorate, Imperial Russia
- Occupations: writer, playwright, poet
- Years active: 1882–1917
- Awards: Griboyedov Prize (1893)

Evgeny Petrovich Goslavsky (Russian: Евгений Петрович Гославский, 30 April 1861 – 15 December 1917) was a Russian writer, playwright and poet.

Born to the family of a landed gentry in the Ryazan Governorate, he started his literary career in the late 1880s, contributing mainly to the magazines of humour and satire, like Shut (Jester), Strekoza and Nablyudatel. Later his stories, poems and plays started to appear in The Artist, Russkaya Mysl and Teatral. In 1890s Goslavsky became known as a dramatist. His play Rasplata (Price to Pay) received the Griboyedov Prize in 1893 and was successfully staged at the Maly Theatre in Moscow. His 1894 comedy V razluke (Apart) was lauded by Anton Chekhov who expressed his delight in a personal letter. They became friends and continued to correspond until 1903.

In early 1900s Goslavsky became a member of the literary group Sreda. His popular work of the early 1900s include Putyom-dorogoiu (Путем-дорогою, On the Road, 1902, short story collection), Svobodny khudozhnik (Свободный художник, Free Artist, 1903, comedy) and Sredi polei (Среди полей, In the Fields, 1905, short stories for children).

Goslavsky died in the village of Staraya Maina, Simbirsk Governorate, on 15 December 1917.
