= Griboyedov Prize =

Literary award

The Griboyedov Prize
- Awarded for: Best Russian-language play
- Country: Imperial Russia
- Presented by: Society of Russian Dramatists and Opera Composers
- First award: 1883

The Griboyedov Prize (Russian: Грибоедовская премия) was a Russian literary award established in 1878 by the Society of Russian Dramatists and Opera Composers to honor Alexander Griboyedov. The opening ceremony was held on 11 February (old style: 30 January), on the anniversary of the great Russian playwright's death. The prize, collected through private donations, was awarded to the best play of the year, produced in Saint Petersburg and Moscow by either Imperial Theatres or their private counterparts. Despite the fact that the Prize was launched in 1878, it was first awarded in 1883.

== Laureates ==
- 1882/1883 — Alexander Ostrovsky, The Handsome Man
- 1883/1884 — Nikolai Chayev, The Tsar and the Grand Prince of Rus Vasily Ivanovich Shuysky
- 1884/1885 — Alexander Ostrovsky, Not of This World
- 1885/1886 — Pyotr Nevezhin, Childhood Friend
- 1886/1887 — Vladimir Tikhonov, The Ace
- 1887/1888 — Pyotr Nevezhin, Second Youth
- 1888/1889 — Dmitry Averkiyev, Teophano
- 1889/1890 — Pyotr Gnedich, The Rolling Stone
- 1890/1891 — Vladimir Nemirovich-Danchenko, The New Business
- 1891/1892 — Leo Tolstoy, The Fruits of Enlightenment
- 1893/1894 — joint winners: Modest Chaykosky, Prejudices; Evgeny Goslavsky, Price to Pay; Vasily Velichko, First Fly
- 1894/1895 — Modest Chaykosky, Fear of Life; Alexander Yuzhin, Old School
- 1896/1897 — Vladimir Nemirovich-Danchenko, Price of Life
- 1897/1898 — Modest Chaykovsky, Wrestlers; Alexander Yuzhin, The Gentlemen
- 1898/1899 — Ippolit Shpazhinsky, Two Fates
- 1900/1901 — Anton Chekhov, The Three Sisters
- 1901/1902 — joint winners: Maxim Gorky, The Philistines; Sergey Naydyonov, Vanyushin's Children and Vladimir Nemirovich-Danchenko, In Dreams
- 1902/1903 — Maxim Gorky, The Lower Depths
- 1903/1904 — Anton Chekhov, The Cherry Orchard
- 1906/1907 — Leonid Andreyev, The Life of Man
- 1909/1910 — Evtikhy Karpov, Brilliant Personality; Evgeny Chirikov, King of Nature
- 1911/1912 — Tatiana Shchepkina-Kupernik, Happy Woman
- 1912/1913 — Pyotr Gnedich, The Assembly; Sergey Naydyonov, Aunt Anya's Love Affair
- 1913/1914 — A. Alpatin, The Last Bet; Vladimir Volkenstein, The Wanderers
- 1914/1915 — N.A. Grigoriev-Istomin, The Kedrov Sisters; Nikolai Shklyar, The Tale of Bonny Prince Albert, Alexey N. Tolstoy, Kasatka
- 1915/1916 – Vladimir Vinnichenko, The Lie; Sergey Naydyonov, The Woman Worker
