= Elizaveta Goreva =

Russian actress and entrepreneur

Elizaveta Nikolayevna Goreva
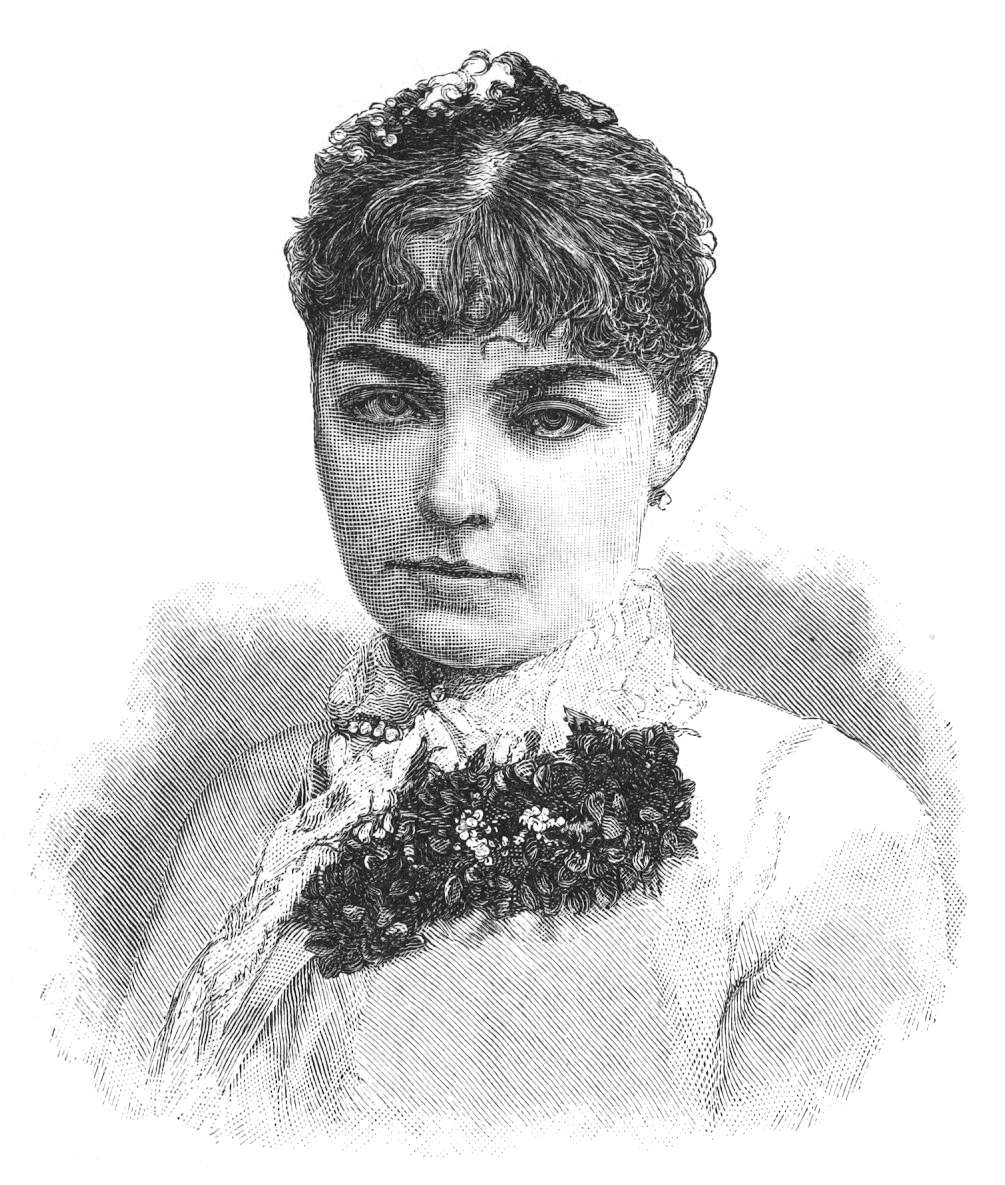
- Born: Elizaveta Nikolayevna Goreva; Елизавета Николаевна Горева; 1859; Poltava, Russian Empire
- Died: 18 July 1917 (aged 57–58)
- Occupations: actress, theatre entrepreneur

Elizaveta Nikolayevna Goreva (Russian: Елизавета Николаевна Горева, née Voronina, 1859—18 July 1917) was a Russian theatre actress and entrepreneur.

== Biography ==
Born in Poltava, Russian Empire, to the head of the city police department. Her parents died when she was young, and she was raised by a relative, Nikolal Miloslavsky, a well known actor of his time who gave her first drama lessons. Under his guidance she debuted on stage the Odessa Theatre, then moved to Kharkiv, and later Saratov and Rostov-on-Don. In the 1878-1879 season she worked in Taganrog, the next year returned to Odessa and in 1880 found herself in Vilno where she succeeded the recently deceased prima A.N. Melnikova-Samoilova as Mary, Queen of Scots in Friedrich Schiller's Mary Stuart, to much public and critical acclaim.

In winter 1881-1882 Goreva worked with the Tiflis theatre, then in the spring found herself in St Petersburg's Alexandrinka and had success as Maryitsa in Dmitry Averkiyev's Kashirskaya Starina (Old Times in Kashira).

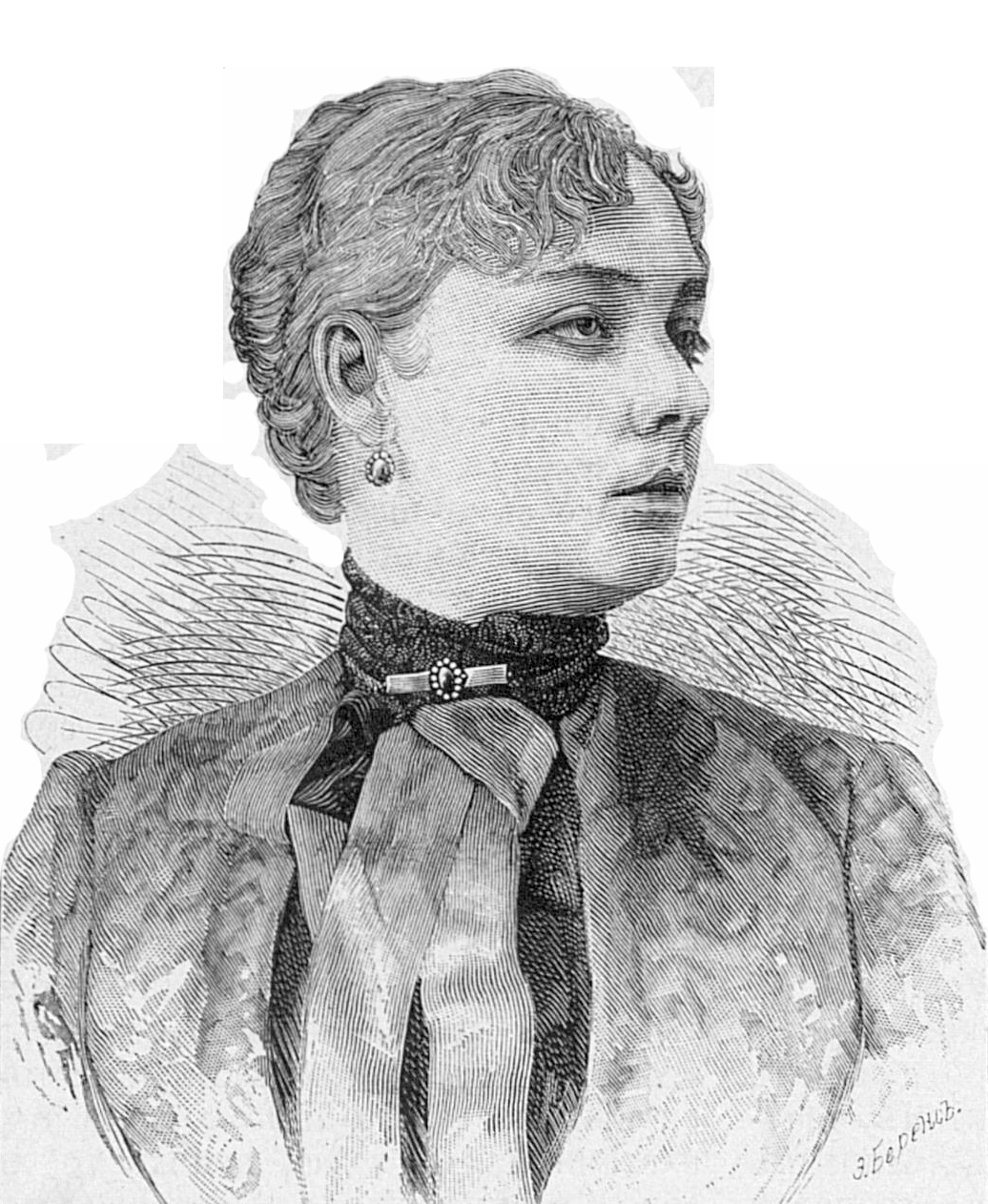
Goreva in 1885

Having failed to secure a long-term engagement, she traveled to Irkutsk. Here, after having divorced the Maly Theatre actor Fyodor Gorev (whom she married in her youth), she spent two years with the city theatre and was celebrated as a star, after the huge success she had as Medea in the eponymous tragedy by Alexey Suvorin and Viktor Burenin.

After two unsuccessful attempts to sign a long-term contract with Alexandrinka, Goreva spent some time in Europe (where she played with numerous troupes, notably in Berlin, Leipzig and Prague). In 1889 she founded her own theatre in Moscow, originally with Pyotr Boborykin as a director. Among the actors engaged in the troupe were Nikolai Sinelnikov, Leonid Sobinov (who made his debut here on 15 January 1891), Mamont Dalsky, Marius Petipa Jr., Nikolai Roshchin-Insarov and, occasionally, her former husband Fyodor Gorev. The Goreva Theatre lasted for just two years, folded for financial reasons but left a strong mark upon the city's cultural life and received good press. She went on to perform in the Russian province, and in 1904 as part of the Paver Orlenev troupe visited several European cities.

According to the Russian Theatre Encyclopedia, "Goreva had classic good looks, beautiful voice and great scenic temperament, slightly marred by the penchant for excessive pathos."
