= Sergey Naydyonov =

- Born: Sergey Alexandrovich Alexeyev; September 26, 1868; Kazan, Russian Empire
- Died: December 5, 1922 (aged 54); Yalta, Soviet Union
- Occupation: playwright
- Awards: Griboyedov Prize (1901/1902)

Sergey Alexandrovich Alexeyev (Russian: Серге́й Алекса́ндрович Алексе́ев, 26 September 1868, Kazan, Imperial Russia, — 5 December 1922, Yalta, Soviet Russia) was a Russian playwright, better known under his pen name Naydyonov (Найдёнов), another one being Rogozhin (Рогожин). His debut play, the semi-autobiographical Vanyushin's Children (Deti Vanyushina, Дети Ванюшина, 1901) proved to be his most famous one and is considered part of the classic Russian drama legacy. It earned him the Griboyedov Prize which he shared that year with Maxim Gorky (The Philistines) and Vladimir Nemirovich-Danchenko (In Dreams). His other notable plays include The Life of Avdotya (Avdotyina zhizn, Авдотьина жизнь, 1904), praised by Maxim Gorky and Walls (Steny, Стены, 1907).
