= Ivanov (play) =

1887 play by Anton Chekhov

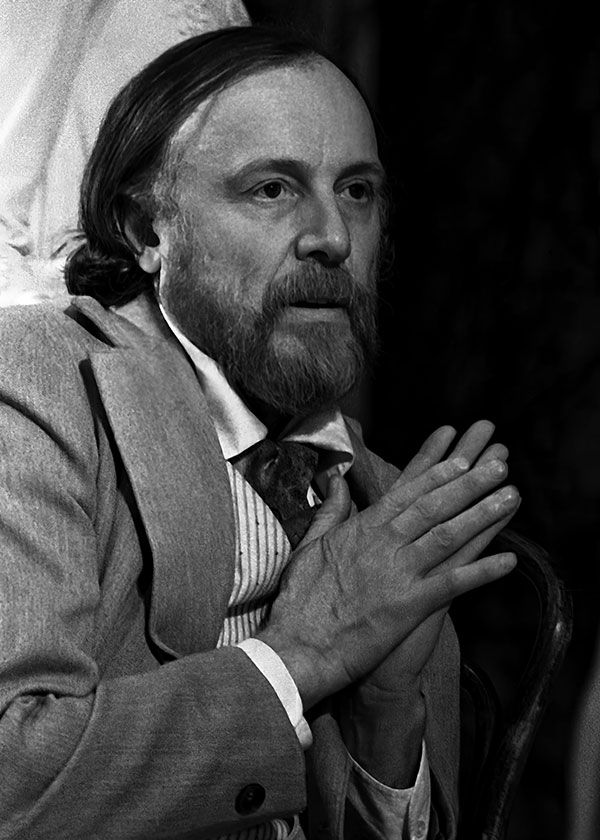
- Innokenty Smoktunovsky in the title role, 1976
- Original language: Russian
- Written by: Anton Chekhov
- Genre: Realistic drama

Premiere
- Date: 19 November 1887
- Place: Korsh Theatre, Moscow

Ivanov (Russian: Иванов; also transliterated as Ivanoff) is a four-act drama by the Russian playwright Anton Chekhov.

Ivanov was first performed in 1887, when Fiodor Korsh, owner of the Korsh Theatre in Moscow, commissioned Chekhov to write a comedy. Chekhov, however, responded with a four-act drama, which he wrote in ten days. The first performance was not a success and the production disgusted Chekhov himself. In a letter to his brother, he wrote that he "did not recognise his first remarks as my own" and that the actors "do not know their parts and talk nonsense". Irritated by this failure, Chekhov made alterations to the play. Consequently, the final version is different from that first performance. After this revision, it was accepted to be performed in St. Petersburg in 1889. Chekhov's revised version was a success and offered a foretaste of the style and themes of his subsequent masterpieces.

== Characters ==
- Nikolai Ivanov – A government official concerned with peasant affairs. Chekhov depicts him as the quintessentially melancholy Russian from the upper social strata. He is severely afflicted by internal conflicts, and his loss of appetite for life, and his problems managing his estate and his debts, collide in a melodramatic climax.
- Anna (born as Sarah Abramson) – Ivanov's wife of five years who unknowingly suffers from tuberculosis. She has renounced Judaism and converted to Russian Orthodoxy in order to marry Ivanov.
- Paul Lebedev – Chairman of the rural district council. Confidant and good friend to Ivanov.
- Zinaida – Lebedev's wife. She is a wealthy lender to whom Ivanov owes a large sum of money.
- Sasha – The Lebedevs' 20-year-old daughter. She is infatuated with Ivanov, an infatuation which ends in her nearly marrying him.
- Eugene Lvov – A pompous young doctor on the council's panel, and a self-consciously "honest man". Throughout the play, he moralizes and attacks Ivanov's character. He later resolves to reveal what he believes are Ivanov's intentions in marrying Sasha.
- Count Matthew Shabelsky – Ivanov's maternal uncle, a geriatric buffoon. He occasionally makes antisemitic jokes, yet his tenderness toward Anna remains undeniable.
- Martha Babakina – A young widow, an estate-owner, and the daughter of a rich businessman. She has a turbulent relationship with the Count.
- Michael Borkin – A distant relative of Ivanov who is steward of his estate. Somewhat of a jester, he comes out with many money-making schemes throughout the play, including his proposal for the Count and Martha Babakina to marry.
- Dmitry Kosykh – An excise officer.

== Synopsis ==
The play tells the story of Nikolai Ivanov, a man struggling to regain his former glory. For the past five years, he has been married to Anna Petrovna, a disinherited Jewess, who has become very ill. Ivanov's estate is run by a distant relative, Mikhail Borkin, who is frequently advising people on how he can help them make money. The doctor, Lvov, an 'honest' man as he frequently reminds the rest of the cast, informs Ivanov that his wife is dying of tuberculosis, and that she needs to recover by going to the Crimea. Unfortunately, Ivanov is unable, and unwilling, to pay for the trip. He is heavily in debt and already owes Zinaida Lebedeva 9000 roubles. Ivanov is criticised for heartlessness and for spending time with the Lebedevs instead of his seriously ill wife. At the end of Act One, Ivanov departs to visit the Lebedevs, and unbeknown to him is followed by Anna and Lvov.

Act Two shows a party at Lebedevs', and features various people discussing Ivanov. They say his only motive for marrying Anna was for the large dowry; however, when she married him, she was forced to convert from Judaism to Russian Orthodoxy and was disowned. Lebedev is married to Zinaida, who manages his money-lending, and they have a daughter, Sasha, who is infatuated with Ivanov. She throws herself at Ivanov and he is unable to resist: the act concludes with the two kissing. Unfortunately, Anna arrives unexpectedly at just this moment and witnesses the betrayal.

Act Three shows a number of conversations between Ivanov and other members of the cast – Lebedev begs Ivanov to repay his debts, and Lvov confronts Ivanov once again about the heartless way he treats Anna. Sasha then appears, concerned by Ivanov's refusal to visit since the incident at the end of Act Two. The act then ends with Anna confronting Ivanov about Sasha's visit, and about how he has lied and cheated on her for the entirety of their marriage. Ivanov's anger is aroused by the false accusation and in a fit of anger he reveals to her that she is dying.

Act Four occurs around a year after the previous acts. Anna has died, and Ivanov and Sasha are preparing to marry. As the wedding is about to begin, Lvov appears, planning to unveil Ivanov's 'evil' intentions – believing Ivanov is simply marrying Sasha for the dowry. He makes the accusation publicly and even though other characters have previously expressed doubts they all leap to Ivanov's defence and challenge Lvov to duels. Ivanov finds the whole situation amusing, returning to his old self, and takes out his gun. Sasha realises what he is about to do, but is unable to stop him: Ivanov runs away from the crowd and shoots himself, abruptly ending the play.

== Adaptations ==
The play is frequently produced in English and several translations are available. The Vivian Beaumont Theater at the Lincoln Center in New York used a colloquial version from David Hare in 1997 – that version was premiered at the Almeida Theatre in London earlier that year and revived with a few changes at the Chichester Festival Theatre in 2015 alongside Hare's versions of Platonov and The Seagull. David Harrower's version was presented at the National Theatre, London, in 2002. Using a translation by actress Helen Rappaport, Tom Stoppard adapted the play for a production at Wyndham's Theatre in London in 2008, starring Kenneth Branagh and Tom Hiddleston. SiNNERMAN Ensemble mounted the work at the Viaduct Theater in Chicago, to great success in 2009 with direction and adaptation by Sheldon Patinkin.

An adaptation by Michael Nathanson, with the setting transported to Winnipeg, Manitoba in the 1950s, was staged by the Winnipeg Jewish Theatre in 2014.

The play was loosely adapted for the 2008 Icelandic film White Night Wedding.

A one-act, 100-minute adaptation by Laura Strausfeld was staged in summer 2026 in New York City by Initiative Productions, starring Sam Underwood in the title role.

== References in other media ==
- The play is discussed in the 2006 film The Treatment.
- The characters of Ivanov and Doctor Lvov are analyzed by existentialist philosopher Lev Shestov in "The Apotheosis of Groundlessness."
