= Evtikhy Karpov =

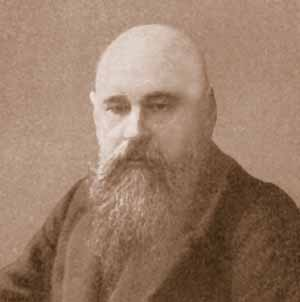
- Born: Evkikhy Pavlovich Karpov; Евтихий Павлович Карпов; 6 November 1857; Karachev, Russian Empire
- Died: 3 January 1926 (aged 68); Leningrad, Soviet Union
- Occupations: dramatist, theatre director

Evtikhy Pavlovich Karpov (Russian: Евтихий Павлович Карпов, 6 November 1857, – 3 January 1926) was a Russian and Soviet playwright and theatre director.

== Biography ==
Born in Karachev into a postmaster's family, Karpov graduated from the Institute of Agriculture and Geodesy in Konstantinovsk. He became a member of Narodnaya Volya first in Bryansk, then in Oryol and Moscow, and was jailed in the early 1880s. It was in prison that he in 1881 wrote his first play Hard Life (Тяжкая доля) which was followed by On the Zemstvo Fields, Ruins of the Past, Free Life, all written in Oryol.

In 1887 Karpov moved to Yaroslavl where he debuted first as a stage actor and then, in 1889, as a theatre director. In 1893 his play Early Autumn (Ранняя осень) was staged by the Alexandrinsky Theatre, featuring Maria Savina. In 1896 Karpov became the head of Alexandrinka where he directed and produced Chekhov's The Seagull (with Vera Komissarzhevskaya as Nina Zarechnaya), which was this play's Russian premiere. In 1900 Karpov left The Alexandrinsky Theatre and joined the Suvorinsky (which was in 1919 reformed into the Bolshoi Drama Theater) where he staged several plays of his own (The Coalmine 'Georgy', The 1812 Moscow Fire, The Victory Man) as well as a host of classics by Alexander Ostrovsky whose legacy he idolised. In 1916 Karpov returned to Alexandrinka to stay with this theatre for the next decade, up until his death in 1926, in Leningrad.

== Legacy ==
In all, Karpov authored more than twenty plays. One of them, Brilliant Personality (Светлая личность) won him the Griboyedov Prize in 1909. He knew personally and corresponded with numerous grand figures of Russian theatre, including Konstantin Stanislavski, Vladimir Nemirovich-Danchenko, Vera Komissarzhevskaya, Maria Savina, Maria Ermolova, Anton Chekhov, many of whom credited him with being one of the most influential men in Russian history of his time. In 1921 Karpov became the first ever recipient of the title the Meritorious Theatre Director of the Republic.
