= Nikolai Sinelnikov =

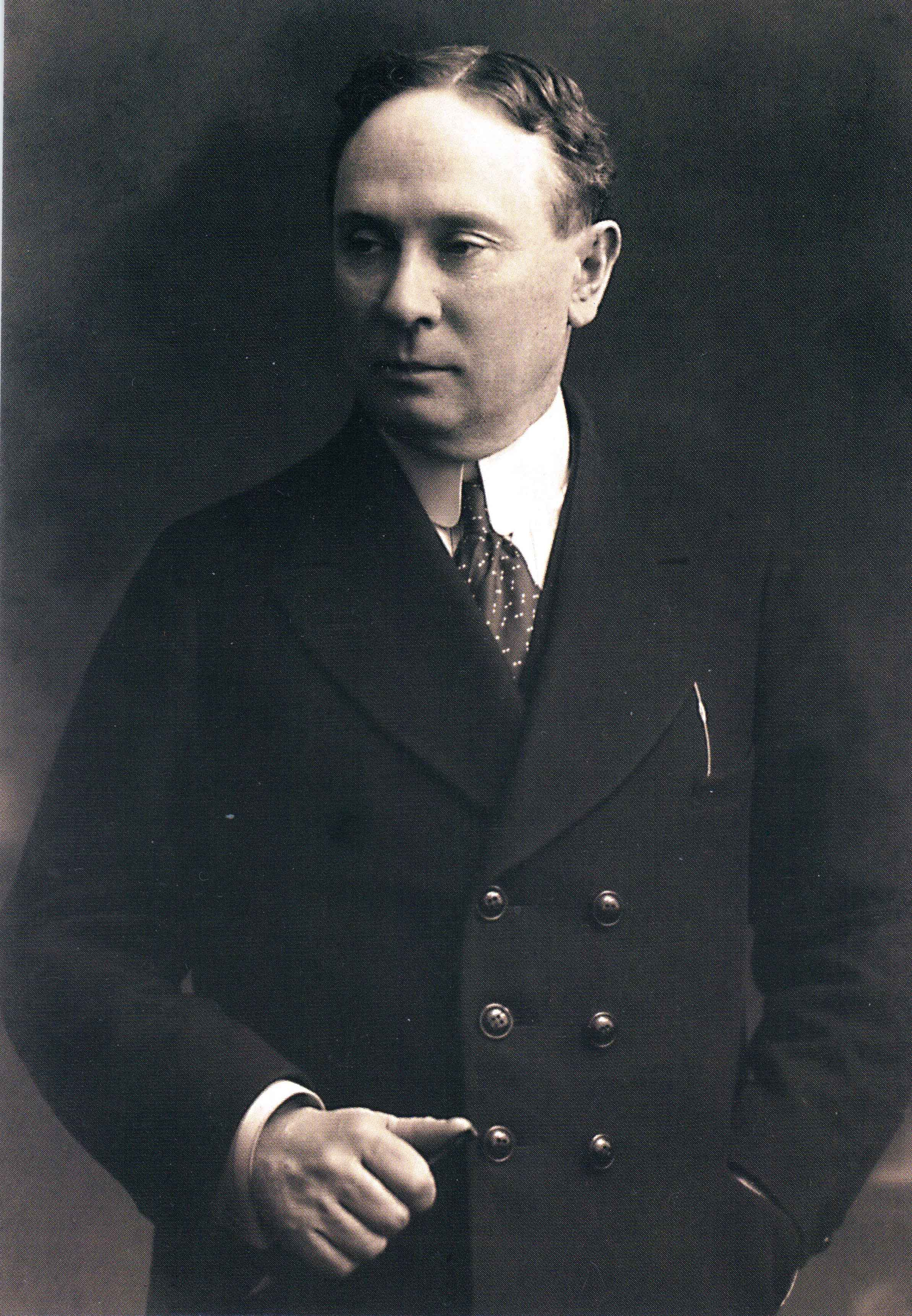
- Born: Николай Николаевич Синельников; February 12, 1855; Kharkov, Ukraine, Russian Empire
- Died: April 19, 1939 (aged 84); Kharkov, USSR
- Occupations: writer, theatre director

Nikolai Nikolayevich Sinelnikov (Russian: Синельников Николай Николаевич; 12 February 1855 – 19 April 1939) was a Russian and Soviet stage actor, theatre director and entrepreneur.

== Biography ==
Born in Kharkov into a teacher's family, Sinelnikov debuted on stage in 1874, as a member of the Kharkov-based Nikolai Dyukov's troupe. He moved on to work in Zhitomir (1875–1877), Nikolayev (1877–1878), Stavropol (1878–1880), Vladikavkaz (1880–1881) and Kazan, where in 1882 he debuted as a stage director with The Wild Girl by Alexander Ostrovsky and Nikolai Solovyov.

In 1889 Sinelnikov moved to Moscow and for two years worked with the private troupes run by Elizaveta Goreva and Maria Abramova. Then he moved to Novorossiysk and launched there another original troupe, the one that in September 1893 gave Vera Komissarzhevskaya her major debut. In 1900 Sinelnikov signed a ten-year contract with the Korsh Theatre in Moscow and successfully staged there the classics by Edmond Rostand, William Shakespeare, and Alexander Ostrovsky, among many others. In 1909 he moved South again to work first in Odessa, then his native Kharkov, to make this city's theatre one of the best in Russia. He stayed with it after the 1917 Revolution up until 1925 when the troupe disbanded. For several years he worked in the province before returning to Kharkov in 1933 where he was appointed the head of the newly formed Russian Drama Theatre.

In 1934 Sinelnikov was awarded the People's Artist of the RSFSR title. In his later years he read drama at the Kharkov theatre college. He also wrote a book of memoirs called Sixty Years on Stage. Nikolai Sinelnikov died in Kharkov on 19 April 1939.
