= Modest Pisarev =

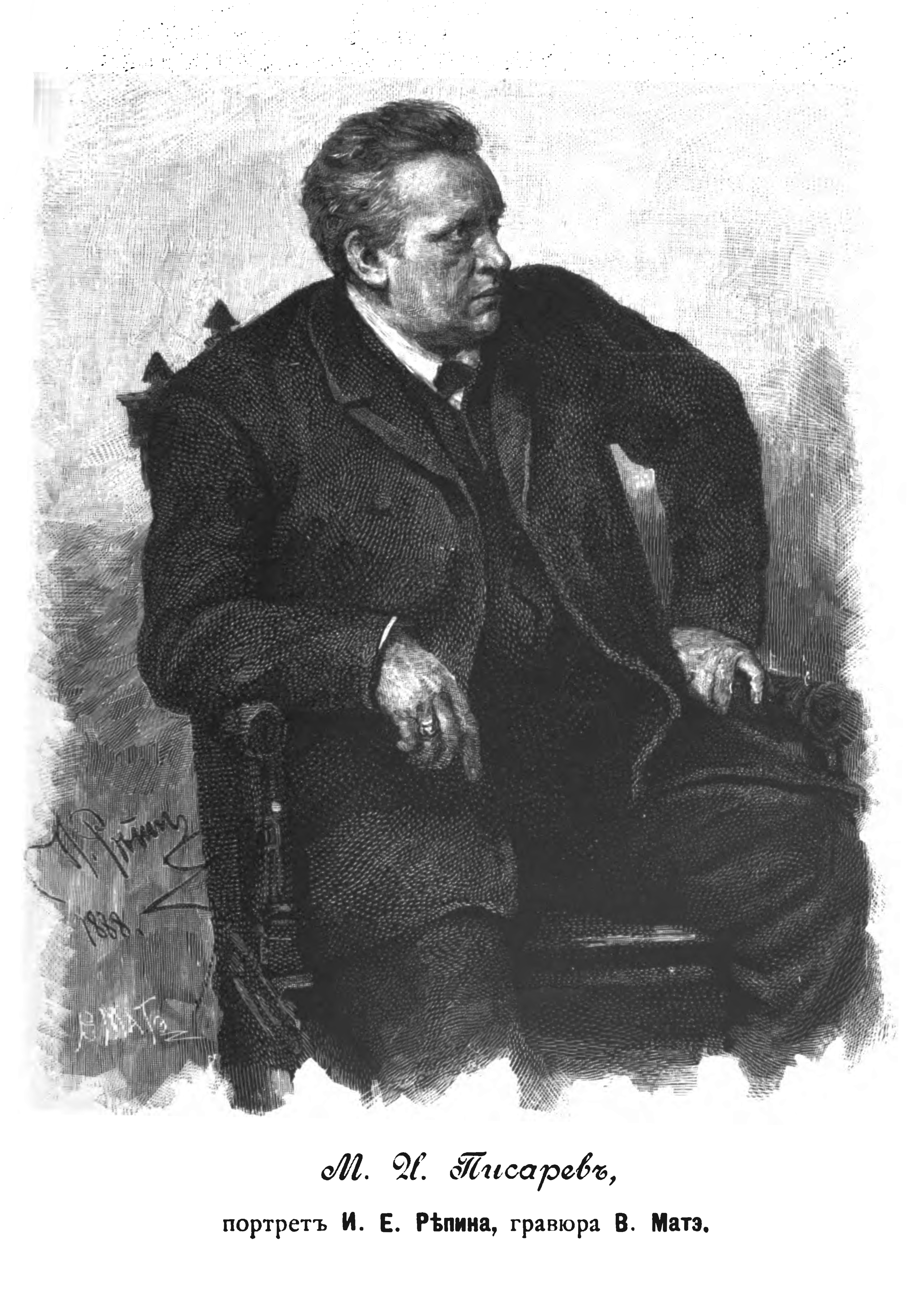
- 1894 portrait by Ilya Repin
- Born: Modest Ivanovich Pisarev; Модест Иванович Писарев; 14 February 1844; Kashira, Russian Empire
- Died: 13 October 1905 (aged 61); Saint Petersburg, Russian Empire
- Occupations: stage actor, theatre critic
- Spouse: Polina Strepetova

Modest Ivanovich Pisarev (Russian: Модест Иванович Писарев, 14 February 1844 — 13 October 1905) was a Kashira-born Russian stage actor, reader in drama and theatre critic.

A Moscow University graduate, Pisarev earned the reputation of a true intellectual of Russian theatre stage, who always "preferred to play thinkers, not lovers." He started to act professionally in 1867 in Simbirsk, later he moved to Orenburg, then worked for some time in Moscow, in Anna Brenko's Pushkin Theatre troupe and Korsh Theatre (which he was a co-founder of), before joining the Saint Petersburg's Alexandrinka in 1885.

Pisarev, who debuted as a 15-year-old as Tishka in Ostrovsky's Family Affair (in which the author himself played the leading role), excelled in the great dramatist's repertoire (Rusakov in Stay in Your Own Sled, Neschastlivtsev in The Forest). Profoundly influenced by both Ostrovsky's work and his artistic mindset, Pisarev authored numerous in-depth critical reviews of his plays, notably of The Storm, in 1860. He also compiled and edited the first edition of the Complete Ostrovsky (Saint Petersburg, 1904-1905) and was instrumental in its publishing.

The actress Polina Strepetova was his wife.
