= Society of Russian Dramatists and Opera Composers =

Russian arts organisation, 1874–1904

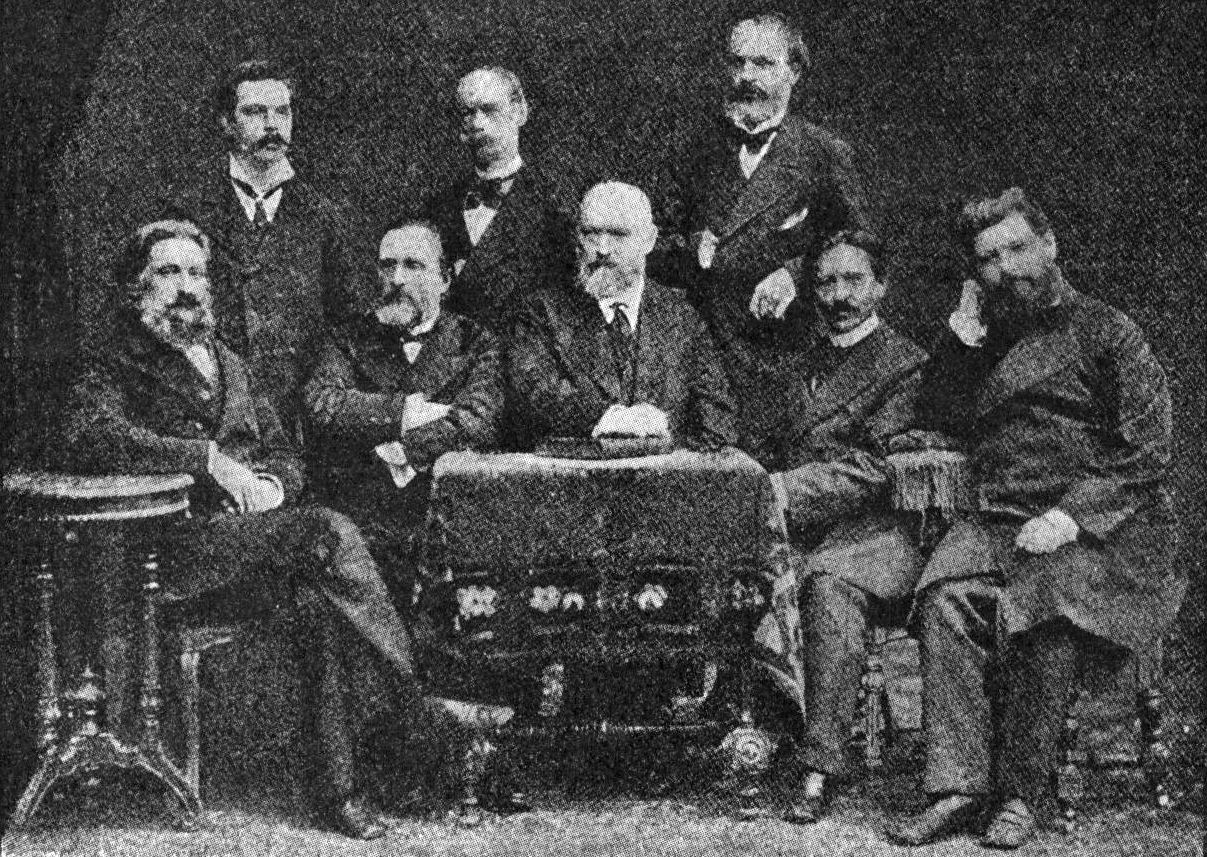
Society of Dramatic Writers In the photo: N. A. Chaev, I. M. Kondratyev, V. I. Rodislavsky, Prince Meshchersky, A. N. Ostrovsky, V. N. Kashperov, A. A. Maikov, M. P. Tsvetkov

The Society of Russian Dramatists and Opera Composers (Russian: Общество русских драматических писателей и оперных композиторов) was an organisation launched in 1874 in Moscow with a view to defending the rights of the authors of music and drama in Russia.

== History ==
The Assembly of Russian Writers, as it was originally called, was founded on 28 November 1870 by a group of authors who gathered at the place of the translator Vladimir Rodislavsky, initially to find the means for preventing works from being produced on theatre stage without their authors' permission.

Ostrovsky was elected its first chairman, Rodislavsky its secretary. After Ostrovsky's death, he was succeeded by first Sergey Yuriev, then Apollon Maykov (the slavist, not to be confused with the renowned poet) and Ippolit Shpazhinsky. In October 1875 a group of composers led by Nikolai Rimsky-Korsakov joined in, and the organization's name was changed to the Society of Russian Dramatists and Opera Composers. In 1887 Anton Chekhov, Vladimir Nemirovich-Danchenko and Dmitry Mamin-Sibiryak became its members.

In 1904 the Society split into the Moscow and Petersburg sections. Both functioned separately up until 1925 when, re-organized, they merged again into the Union of the Drama and Music Writers (Союз драматических и музыкальных писателей).
