= Anna Brenko =

Russian actress (1848–1934)

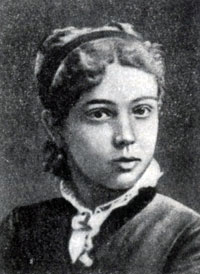
- Anna Brenko in 1870s
- Born: Anna Chelishcheva; 7 April 1848; Vladimir, Russian Empire
- Died: 15 November 1934 (aged 87); Moscow, USSR
- Occupations: Stage actress, theatrical entrepreneur, playwright, memoirist
- Years active: 1873–1920s
- Spouse: Iosif Levenson
- Awards: Meritorious Artist of the RSFSR

Anna Alekseyevna Chelishcheva (Russian: А́нна Алексе́евна Чели́щева, 7 April 1848, Vladimir, Russian Empire – 15 November 1934, Moscow, USSR) – better known by her stage name of Anna Brenko ( А́нна Бренко́)– was a Russian stage actress, theatrical entrepreneur, playwright, and memoirist, honored in 1924 with the title of Meritorious Artist of the RSFSR.

== Life ==
Brenko was born in Vladimir in 1848 and first worked as a teacher. She trained as an actress in St Petersburg and married the music critic Iosif Levenson.

She had made a name for herself at the Maly Theatre in Moscow, where she organized concerts to gather funds for exiles in Siberia. The banker Melkiel backed her plans and she launched the first ever Russian private theatre in 1880 (officially named the A.A. Brenko Drama Theatre, but popularly known as the Pushkin Theatre – for the simple reason that it was situated close to Pushkin Square). Brenko paid much higher salaries, insisted on new scenery and three week rehearsals for productions that included works by William Shakespeare and Aleksandr Ostrovsky.

Brenko shared management decisions with the actors Modest Pisarev and Vasily Andreyev-Burlak, although she had the final say. Brenko was driven by the artistic event and she was exploited by other actors and directors. The theatre folded for financial reasons in 1882 (to be later purchased by the entrepreneur Fyodor Korsh).

Brenko went on to teach drama (in her own theatre college between 1890 and 1905) and in 1915 she opened the free Workers' Theatre where 25 plays were produced in the course of two years.

In 1917, Brenko not only embraced the October Revolution but enlisted, at the age of 69, in the Red Army and performed, together with some of the actors in her troupe, at battle fronts.

== Publications ==
Brenko authored four plays (1883–1916) and six books of memoirs (1924–1933).
