= Opuvani do =

Irregularly funnel shaped sinkhole in Montenegro

- Oпүвaхи до
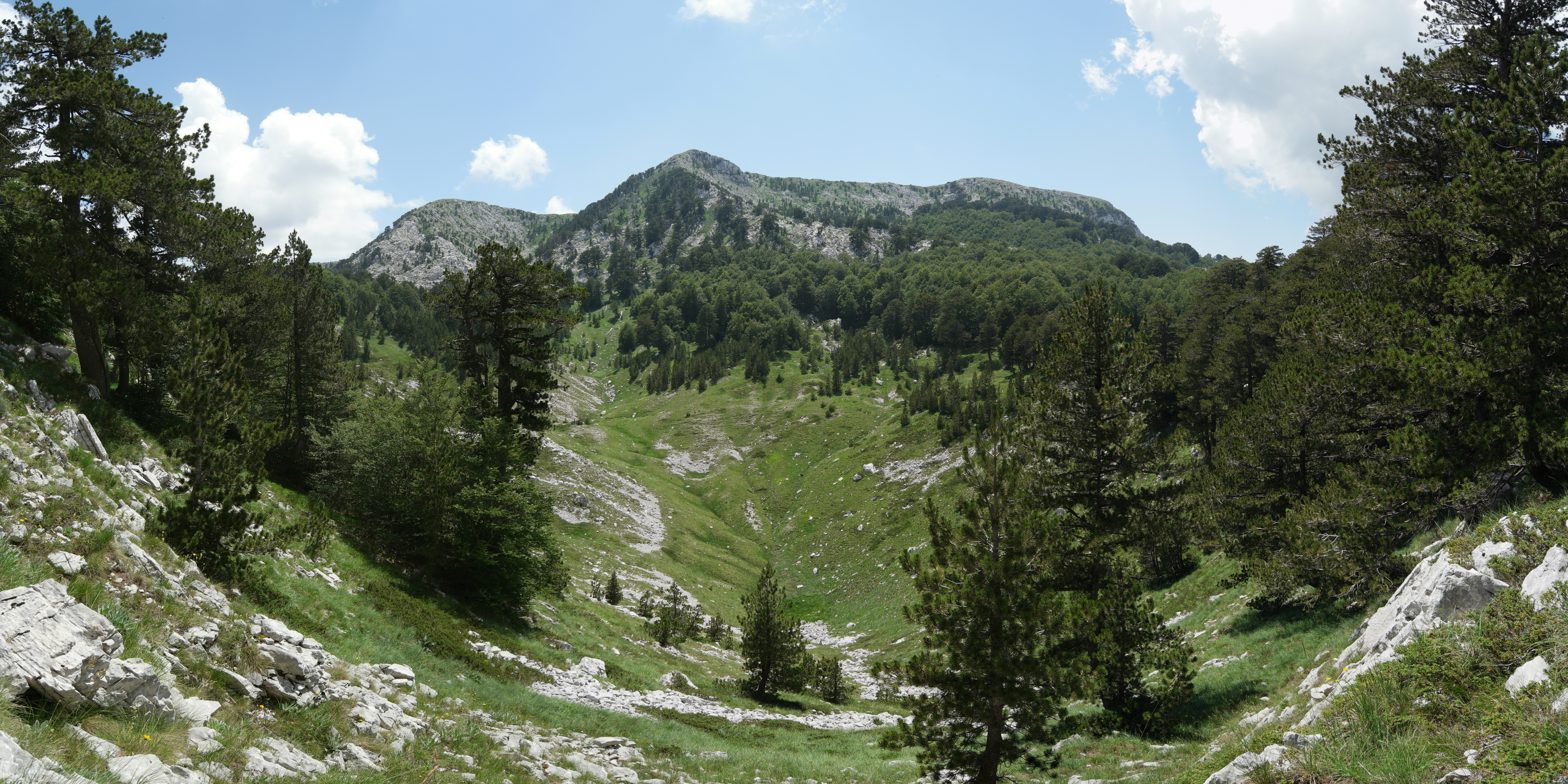

Highest point
- Elevation: 1,584 m (5,197 ft)
- Coordinates: 42°36′10″N 18°32′55″E

Geography
- Location within Montenegro
- Location: Montenegro
- Parent range: Orjen

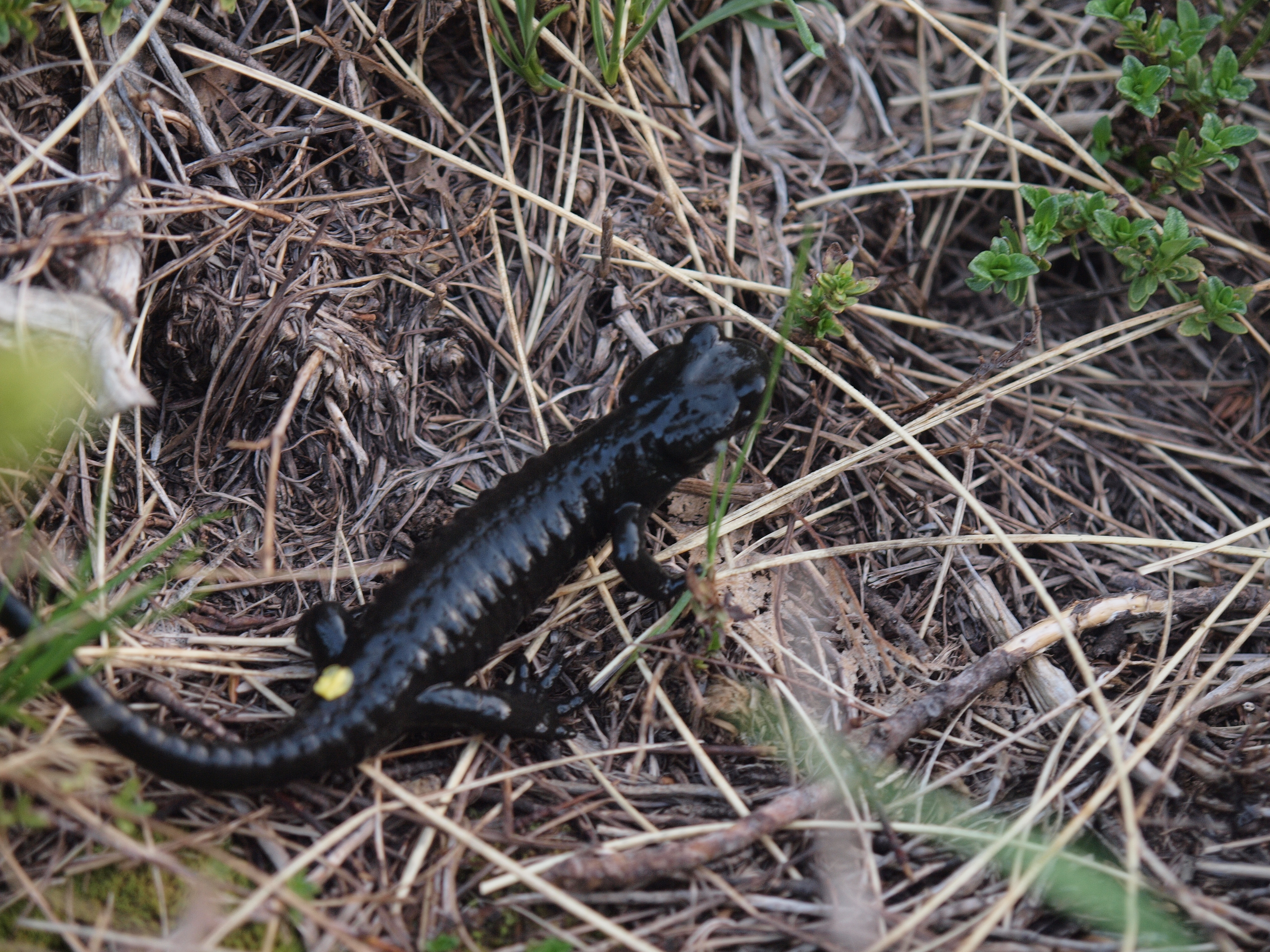
Specimen of the Alpine salamander in the sink

The Opuvani do (Serbian: Windy valley) is a sinkhole at the northern slope of the Velika Jastrebica in the Orjen mountain range located in Montenegro. It creates a major refugium to arcto-alpine and alpine biota in a region with warm winters. As the 60 m deep sinkhole is prone to cold-air pooling, frequent freeze-thaw cycles create favourable conditions for periglacially formed features (i.e. solifluction, periglacially patterned ground). The sinkhole is at 1584 m elevation and consists of 4 interconnected sinks. The major sink is laterally elongated, 440 m long. The outflow of the cold air is at 1647 m and the depth of the basin atmosphere is 63 m.

In 2020, a relict population of the Alpine salamander (Salamandra atra) was reported from the sink, which fills a 200 km wide distribution gap in the species range.

== Topography and Geology ==
The Opuvani do is on Mt Orjen on the Bijela gora, which is part of the High Karst nappe. It is formed of Triassic-Paleogene shallow water calcareous sediments, which were interrupted by a short episode of Middle Triassic deepening and rifting-related volcanism, which is characteristic for the larger Adriatic carbonate platform. It is estimated that the High karst nappe has a recent thrusting of at least 30 km. The Opuvani do is interditated with wide slopes. At its southern part, a fluvioglacial short trench of a paleo-valley (dry valley) leads upslope to the alpine valley that intersects the Jastrebica ridge. The eastern side of the shallow fluvioglacial channel is showing terraces of putative glaviofluvial origin.

The Opuvani do was formed between the axis of the overturned syncline of the Jastrebica ridge and the axis of an oblique anticline in the Opaljika escarpment. Upslope bedrock lithologies of the Jastrebica are composed by upper Cretaceous series of bedded Turonian limestones. Bedded Cenomanian dolomitic limestones appear further downslope. The Opuvani do is embedded in lithologies at the Cenomanian/Turonian border of the High-Karst nappe. It formed in vertical shortened, steep layered, bedded Cenomanian dolomitic limestones. Geological configuration for the paleodoline development is constricted in the folding of the Opaljika (1668 m a.s.l) anticline with bedrocks of lower Cretaceous and upper Jurassic dolomites.

== Refugial vegetation ==
It was previously assumed that glacial relict/refugial flora are absent in the maritime High-Karst physiographic area with warm winters from the Mount Orjen Range in Montenegro. After a recent detection of residual arcto-alpine and boreo-alpine biocoenoses (Salicion retusae, Scabioso silenifoliae-Dryadetum octopetalae, Drepanoclado uncinati-Heliospermetum pusillum and Allietum schoenoprasi), 70 km south of known Dinaric inland localities, this assumption was called into question. The reason for the survival of cold loving species in a climate with warm winters is attributed to frequent cold-air pooling, which creates local areas with continental climates.

== Climate ==
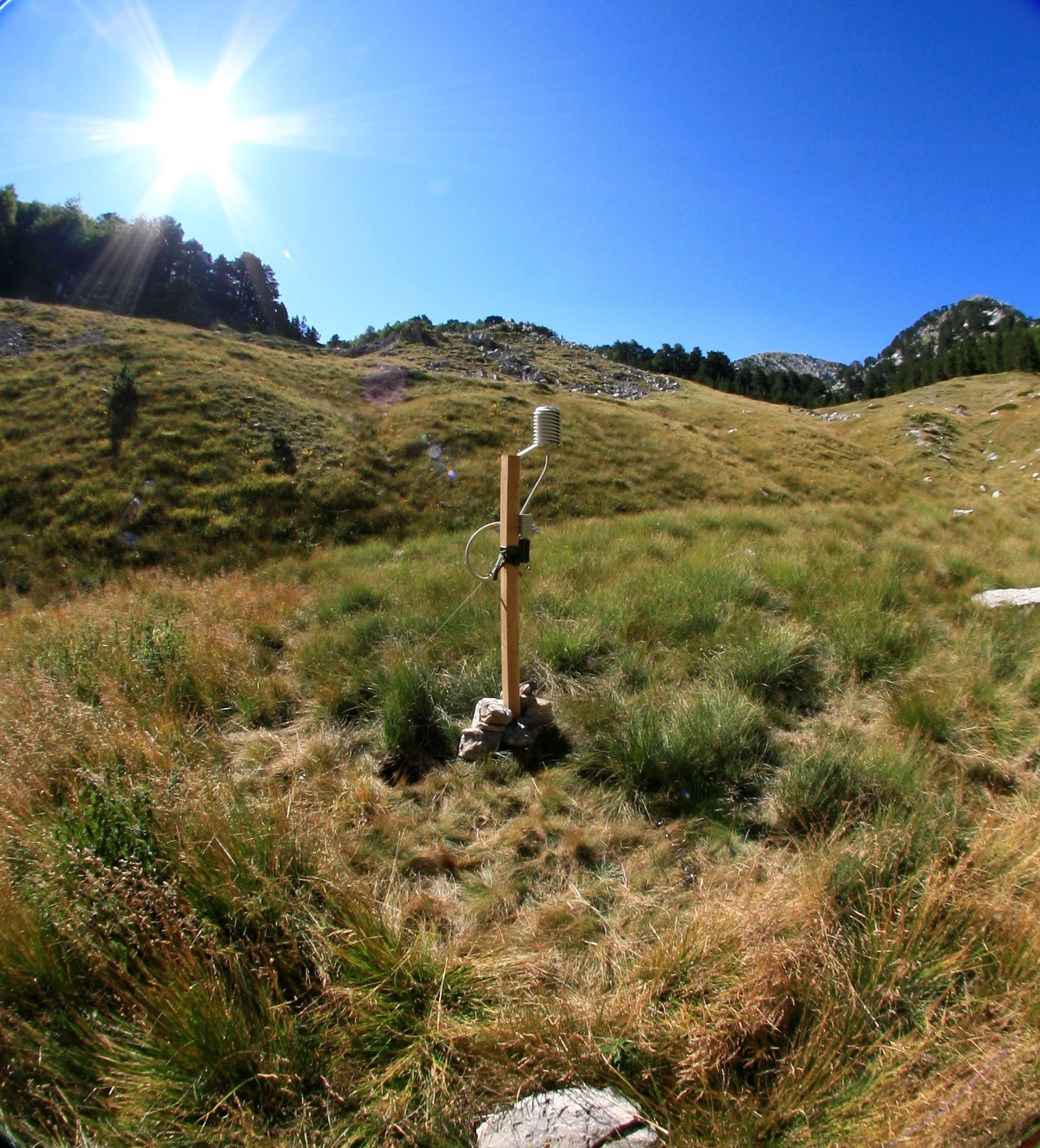
Temperature data loggers at the bottom of the sink were installed in August 2020

The closest weather station which provides official weather service data is located at Crkvice. As it lies at an elevation of 940 m temperature measurements are not representative to the local microclimate of the sinkhole.

In order to get more precise data for the local basin atmosphere, temperature data loggers had been installed through a funded project at the Department of Geography at LMU Munich since August 2020.
