= Orjen =

Mountain range in Bosnia and Herzegovina and Montenegro

- Орјен (Serbo-Croatian)
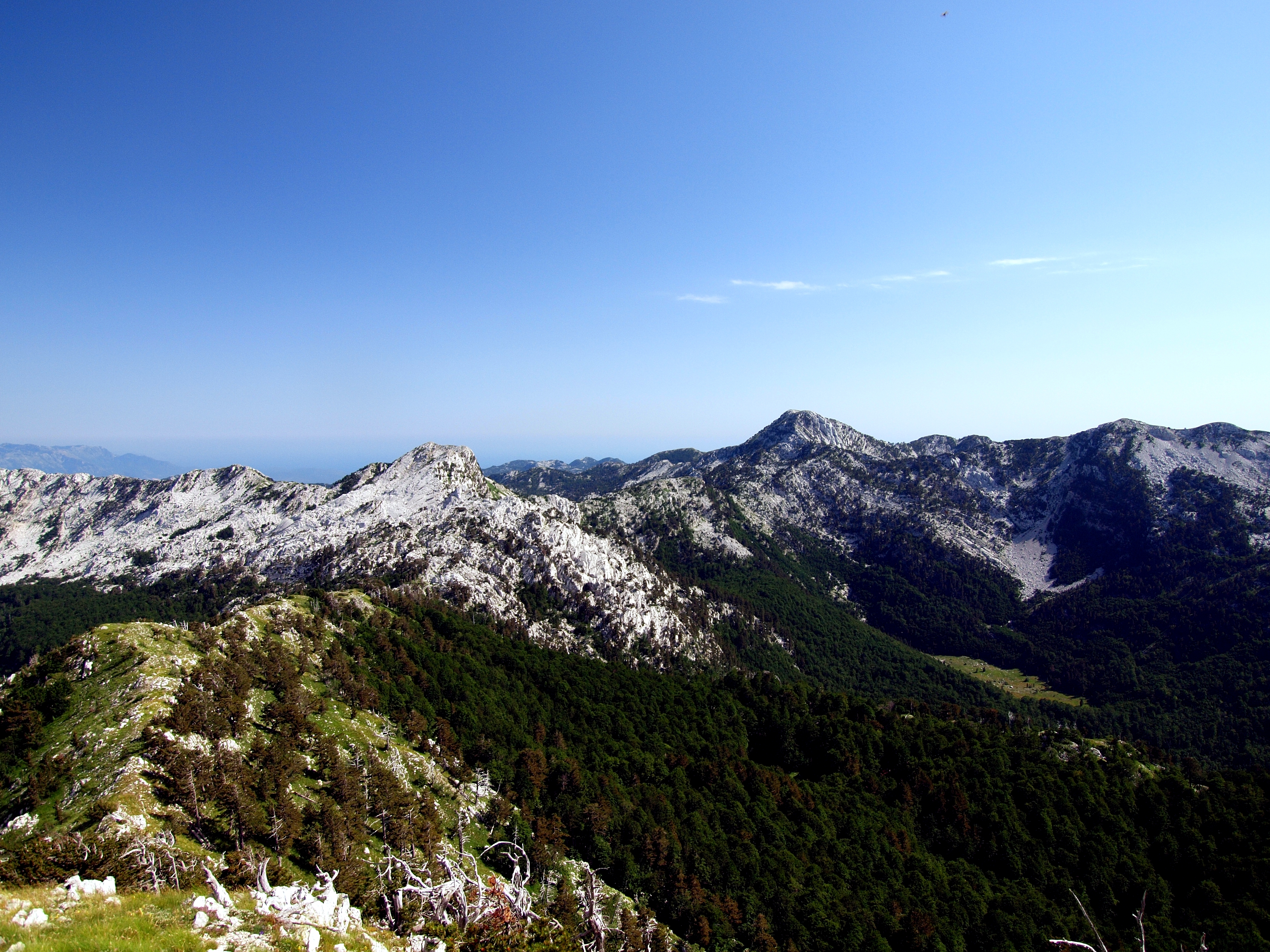
- View of Orjen with peaks Veliki kabao (right) and Vučji zub (left)

Highest point
- Elevation: 1,895 m (6,217 ft)
- Coordinates: 42°34′08″N 18°32′56″E

Geography
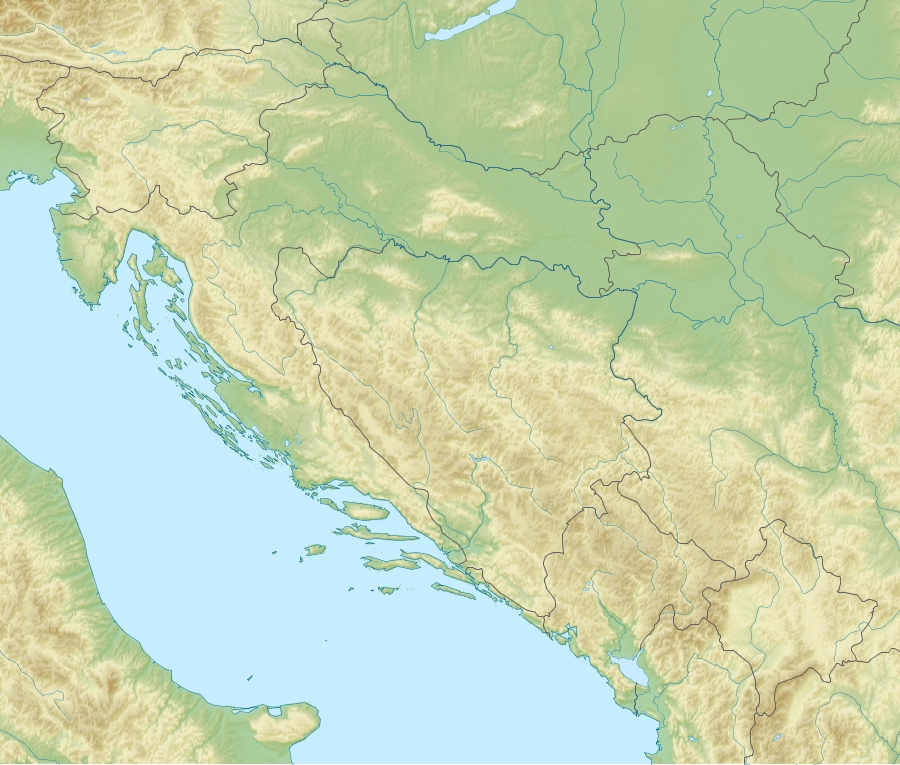
- Location within Dinaric Alps

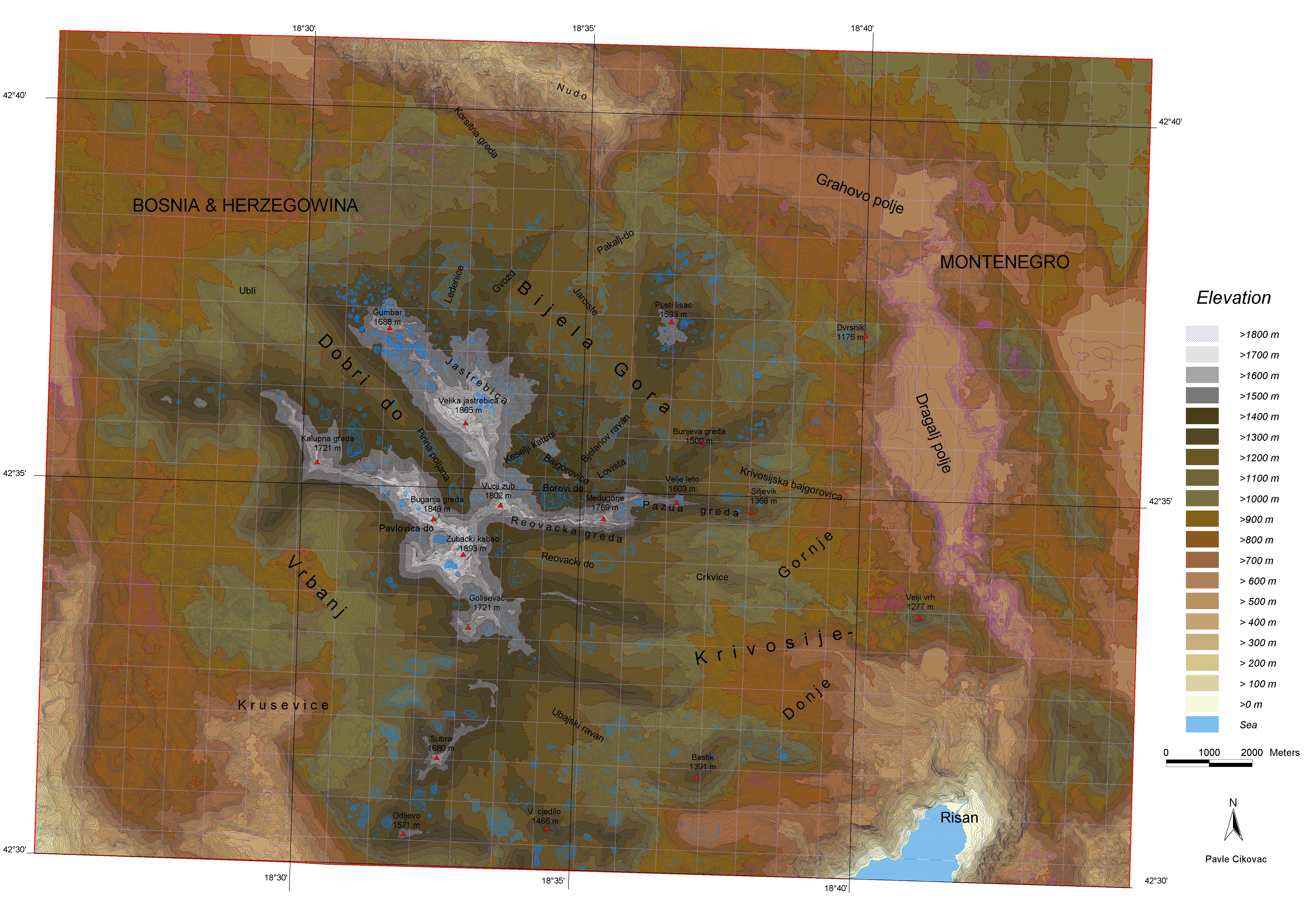
- Location: Montenegro and Bosnia and Herzegovina
- Parent range: Dinaric Alps

Geology
- Rock age: Cretaceous
- Mountain type: Fold mountain
- Rock type: Glaciokarst

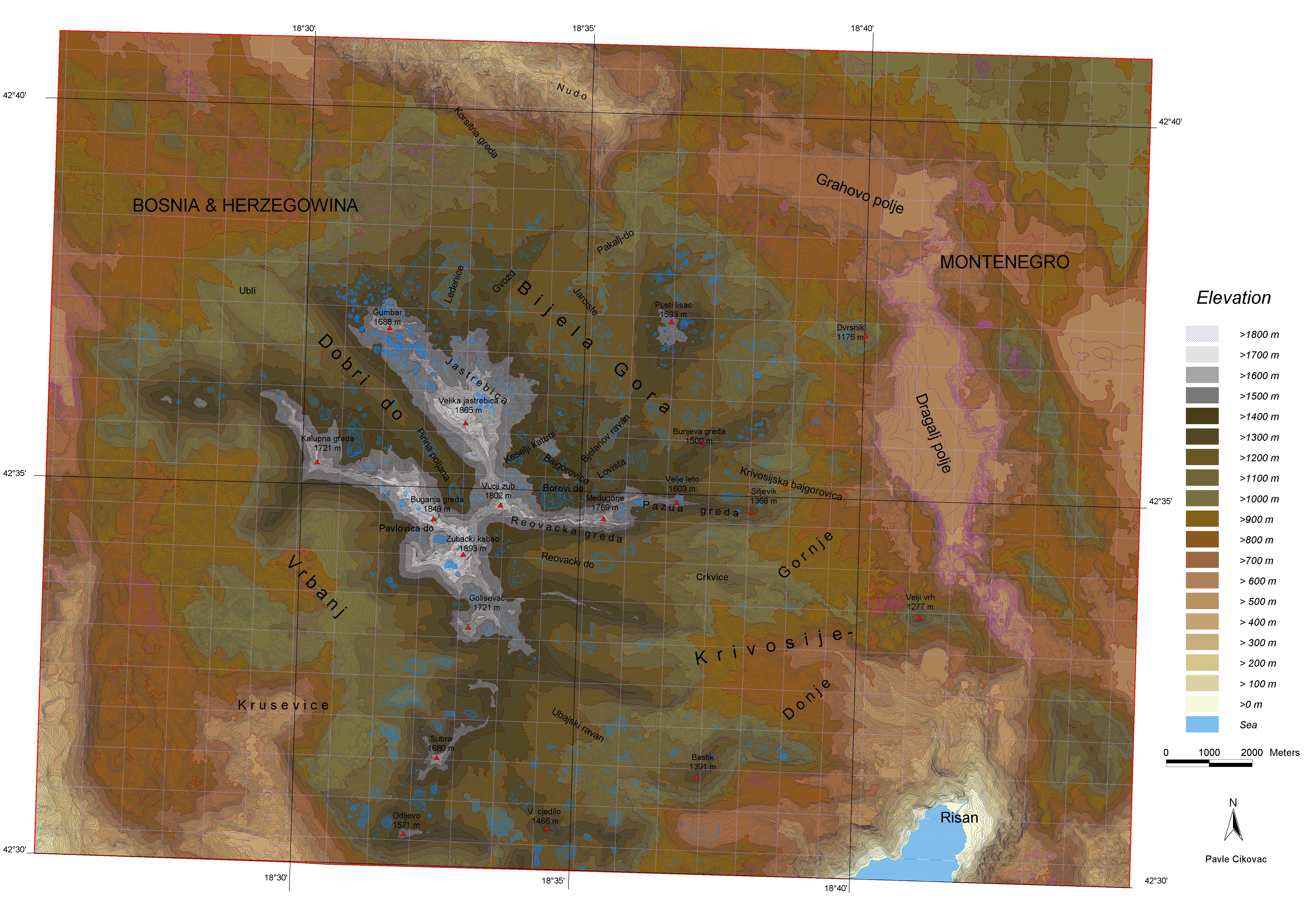
Mount Orjen topographic map

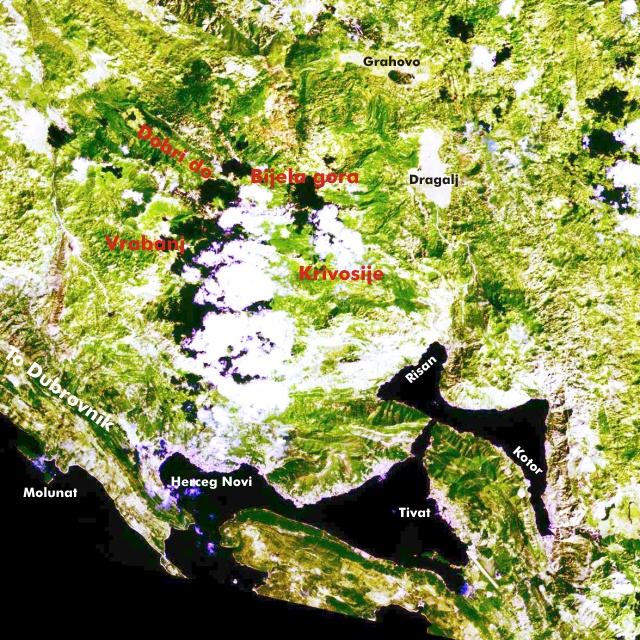
Broader region of Orjen and Bay of Kotor. 7 August 2001.

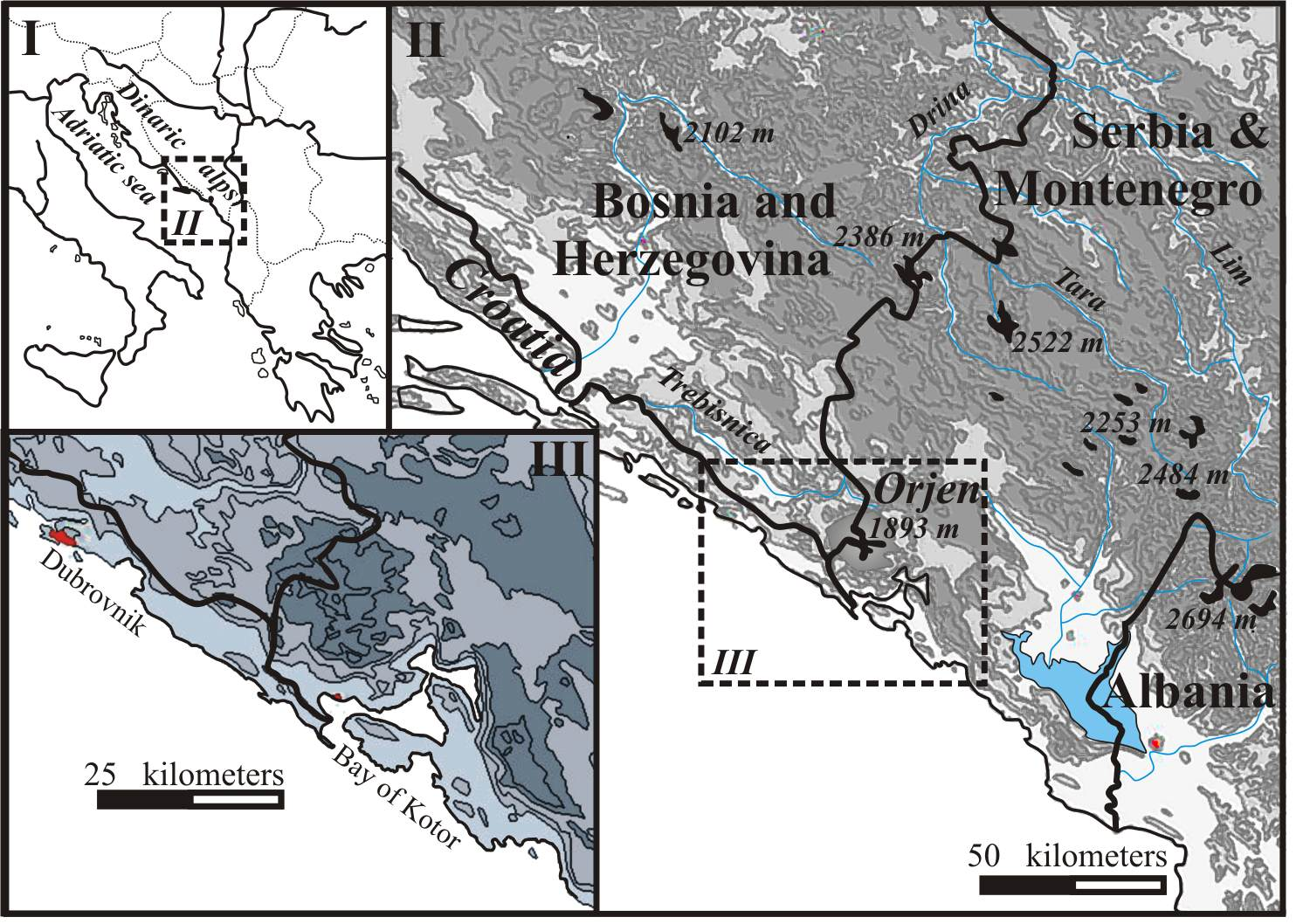
Orjen is located in the South-east Dinaric Alps

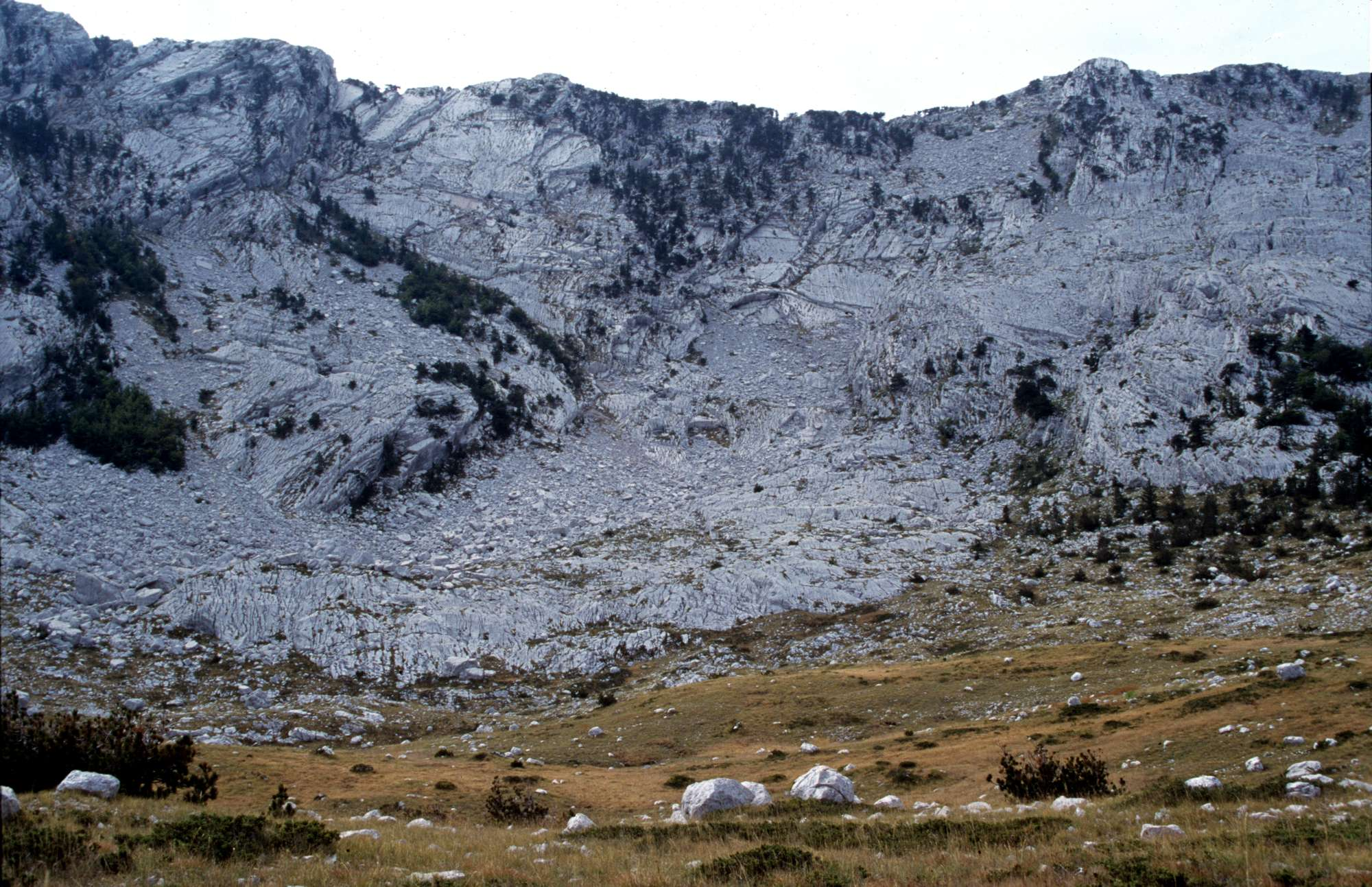
Cirque Borovi do in the north at Bijela gora

Orjen (Montenegrin Cyrillic: Орјен, pronounced [ɔ̂rjɛn]) is a transboundary Dinaric Mediterranean limestone mountain range, located between southernmost Bosnia and Herzegovina and southwestern Montenegro.

Its highest peak is Veliki kabao, which stands at 1,895 m (6,217 ft). The Orjen Peak is the highest peak in the Sub-Adriatic Dinarides. The massif of Orjen lies east to south-east of Trebinje in Bosnia and Herzegovina and north-west of Risan in Bay of Kotor (Montenegrin: Boka Kotorska). From the town of Risan, situated at the innermost protected part of the bay, a well-engineered road, at first metalled, with many hairpin bends climbs to about 1600 m, over to the interior. At the main summit of Orjen and the surrounding ridges and high plateaus the action of quaternary glaciation is evident. During the Ice Age, long valley glaciers receded from Orjen to the Bay of Kotor and surrounding poljes. Hollowing U-shaped valleys and cirques in their course. Glaciers also shaped jagged peaks and ridges. Glacial and karst type relief combine now in a unique coastal scenery. There are few places elsewhere in the Mediterranean which demonstrate similar phenomena.

The Natural and Culturo-Historical Region of Kotor is a UNESCO World Heritage site, comprising the territory between Orjen and Lovćen, including all the small towns in the bays of Risan and Kotor with their natural setting. With this privileged natural harbour the Bay of Kotor has been settled for millennia. Illyrians and Greeks colonised the coast from 400 BC and established today's ports Risan (Rhizon) and Kotor (Cattaro). Due to lack of potable water, the high mountain was never densely populated. Snow patches collected from deep pit holes were used even late in the 20th century to provide the few hamlets with water. Today, wells are used instead.

== Geography ==
Mount Orjen is a block mountain lifted up as a horst and thus towering above the lowered Bay of Kotor and the high karst plateaux surrounding the Mount Orjen horst. With 1895 m difference between the lowest and the highest point, relief energy has a great role in the extremely harsh environment. A hyperkarstic barren landscape of vast karren fields contrasts with very species rich vegetation types, ranging from evergreen deciduous forests at lower altitudes to endemic calcareous Dinaric Fir and Pine forests in higher altitudes. Precipitation reaches 5000 L per m^{2}, amounts typical for tropical rainforests or the eastern Himalayas than the dry Mediterranean. Lying at Europe's wettest coast, snow easily accumulates on karstic plateaux and as late as June small snow patches continue to lie in shaded places under the summits. Skiing is possible but no relevant infrastructures exist today. Orjen is a more important hiking destination. Three mountain huts provide basic accommodation.

Orjen comprises transboundary area of about 400 km^{2} between Bosnia and Herzegovina and Montenegro, and runs for 25 km from region around Trebinje in Bosnia and Herzegovina in the north-west, to Bay of Kotor in Montenegro in the south-east. Mount Orjen is composed of four high karstic plateaux divided by ridges. Three near parallel ridges collide in Veliki kabao, Orjens' culmination point. The ridges are arranged by elevation with the highest to the north screening the Bijela gora plateaux from the Mediterranean coast. The separated plateaux are the Krivošije to the East, Bijela gora to the North, and Dobri do and Vrbanj to the West. Only few settlements are scattered in surrounding poljes. The poljes of Grahovo, Dragalj, Vrbanj, Krusevica and Grabalj are important for agricultural use and provide the only lines of communication in the karst. Migration circled around Mount Orjen as a major obstacle between the coastal, Herceg Novi and Risan and the interior towns of Grahovo, Trebinje and Nikšić.

Several dry river valleys are found on Orjen. Only in decades they react as short-living rivers when heavy rain and snow-melt combine. Flooding can be a problem and several poljes are renowned for their long inundation periods.

=== Glacial traces ===
Mediterranean mountains bear no glaciers any more except small snow fields in some shaded cirques of the Taurus range. Even during the pleistocene snowlines were not much lower as in today's Alps. Glaciers were only of local significance in the Mediterranean enabling frost sensitive vegetation types to survive the climate changes of the Quaternary. Among the once glaciated Mediterranean mountains Orjen was outstanding for one of the biggest ice cap in the region. A 150 km^{2} covered 1/3 of the area. All part above 900 m were buried under a thick sheet of ice from where several glacial tongues descended to 500 m above sea level. Traces of glacial activity are evident in any part of Orjen as in the Bijela gora plateaux. No glacial lakes survive today as they were extinguished due to the porosity of the karstified landscape. Many cirques, U-shaped valleys and moraines and jagged ridges and summits bear the evidence of the glacial erosion.

In Stone Age and Bronze Age humans settled in the Orjen region. This early human activity is depicted by rock paintings of deerhunt and humans in Lipci rock art in Risan bay. A major Bronze Age excavation site is at Popovo polje to the north of Mount Orjen.

Snow lines across the Mediterranean. The upper line shows recent snowlines the bigger signifies those from the last Ice age. Mount Orjen due to heavy precipitation was in Ice age a major center of the Mediterranean local glacier formation

=== Karst ===
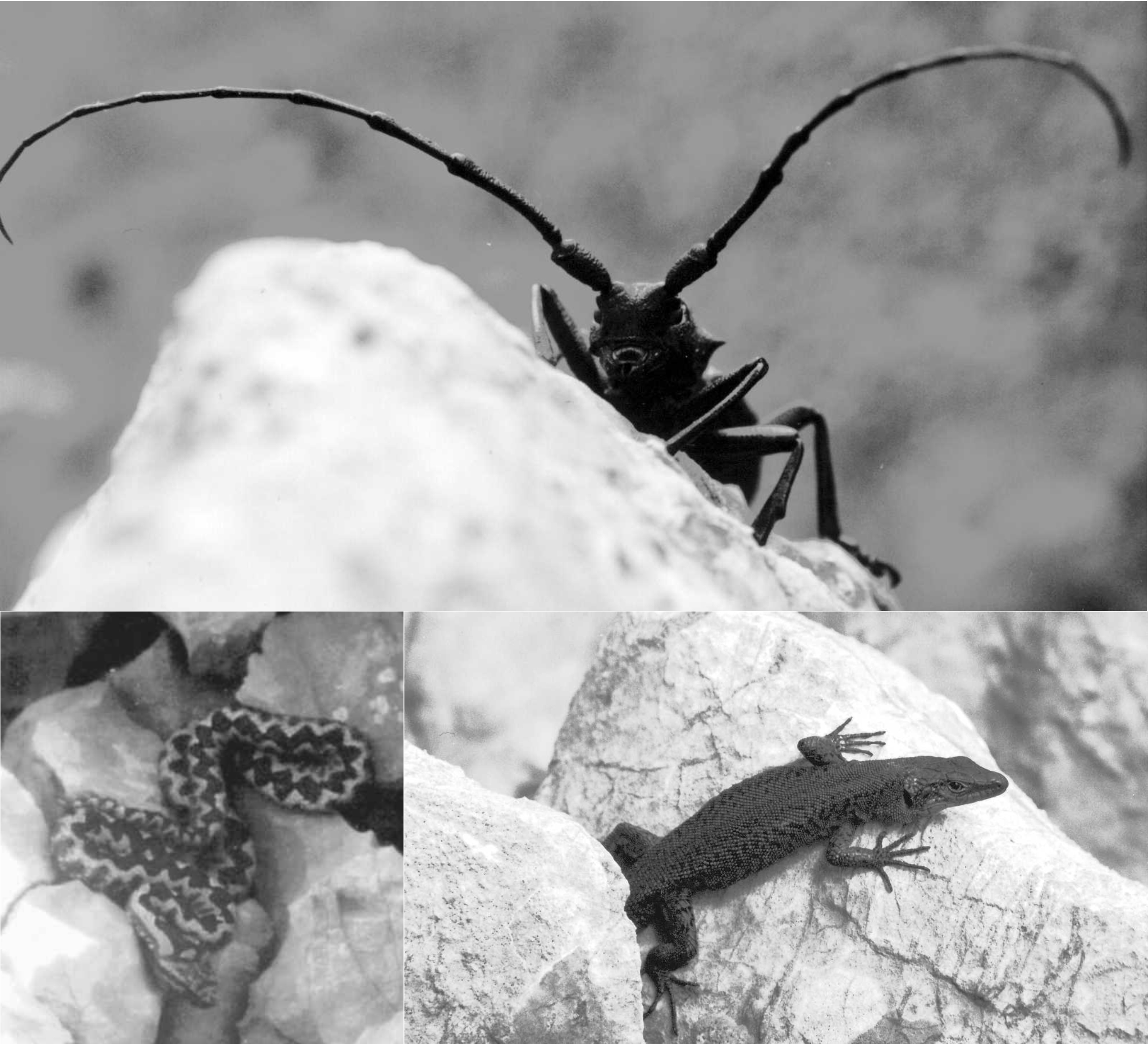
Karst fauna on Orjen

Mount Orjen is built up from pure Cretaceous limestone. As precipitation and temperatures are high and vegetation is abundant karstification processes are evolved. Lapies, sinkholes and caves resolve from the solution of the limestone. The solution process is the faster the more water is available for solution. Vegetation and soilformation play also a role in the process. A major disadvantage is that the water is percolating fast in the porous rocks and does not form brooks and rivers despite the heavy amounts of precipitation. An overall dryness is characteristic that is unsuitable for settling. Thus the region has been depopulated for a long time. Only during times of repression the unfavourable high mountains were mainly populated by Montenegrin tribes. During the time of the Ottoman rule from the 15th to the 19th century the high karst was acting as main shelter for the Christian population. Military campaigns of Ottomans and Austro-Hungarians faced heavy losses while both great powers underestimated the difficulties to undertake successful raids in karst areas. The Battle of Vučji Do between Montenegrins and Turks and the Krivošije uprising in 1869 showed that the Montenegrins used the natural conditions in their favour.

Karst is also a major tourist attraction as caves are frequent and peculiar geomorphological forms can be studied. Karst vegetation on the other hand is species rich and major karst areas are hot spots of biodiversity. The both famous Southeast Asian karst areas like the Guilin tower karst region in Southern China or Phuket island in Thailand and the Mediterranean dinaric karst areas with the Plitvice lakes in Croatia and the Bay of Kotor in Montenegro rival with spectacularity.

=== Geology ===
Tectonically the area of the Southern Adriatic is very active as the frequency of earthquakes indicates. As the Adriatic Plate subduces under the Dinarides, earthquakes can have devastating energy. Sometimes even tsunamis are observed. Mount Orjen is completely built of folded Cretaceous limestones which belongs to the High-Karst Zone geological unit. The High-Karst Zone has the greatest extent in the territory of Montenegro. The terrain of this geotectonic unit is mainly built up of Mesozoic (Triassic, Jurassic and Cretaceous) limestones and dolomites of several kilometres of thickness. This thickness is even larger, due to the reverse faulting and overthrusting and thus repeating of carbonate series. The karst of this region is characterised by all surface occurrences and all processes characteristic for holokarst such as: karst plain, polje, uvala, sinkhole, dry-, hanging-, blind- and karstified valley, lapies, canyon, shaft, cave, resurgence, vrulja, estavelle and so on. The karstification of limestones and dolomites in this area is below the base level of erosion, below the sea level and is deeper than 1,000 m. The High-Karst Zone has all the prominent characteristics of fluvial erosion (deep canyons of Komarnica and Morača rivers with their tributaries), glacial erosion (on Mount Orjen), lacustrine, sea and combined erosion.

Along the internal belt of Bay of Kotor, from Morinj, across Risan to Kotor, the High-Karst Zone is in direct contact with the sea, as the High-Karst Zone overthrusts the Pindus Cukali Zone where Mount Orjen rises from the Bay of Risan. The direct contact of the Adriatic Sea and the High-Karst Zone leads to interesting hydrological phenomena. In these terrains the largest vrulja on the Adriatic coast, called Sopot, is located. The vast differences in water-yielding capacity of the constant and periodic karst springs point out to the strong karstification of High-Karst Zone limestones and dolomites on Mount Orjen. The difference between minimal and maximal water yielding capacity is over 350 m³.

=== Climate ===
Orjen is within the Mediterranean subtropical belt. While summers are hot and sunny, autumn, winter and spring are rainy seasons. It is the climate type of the Mediterranean but modifications exist in the vast region. For example, sinkholes may create local areas with continental microclimates as is the cas with the Borovi do and Opuvani do, where frequent freeze-thaw cycles create favourable conditions for arcto-alpine and alpine biota. A peculiarity of the littoral Dinarides is the precipitation regime as Orjen receives Europe's' most heavy precipitation. Like the monsoon rain is seasonally distributed, thus November thunderstorms sometimes pour 2000 L of water in several days, while August is frequently completely dry leading to forest fires. With a maximum discharge of 200 m³/s water one of the biggest karst springs, the Sopot spring, is a remarkable indicator of this seasonality. Most of the time it is inactive but after heavy rain a remarkable waterfall appears 20 m above the Bay of Kotor.

Station	Height [m]	Type	Character	Precipitation [mm]	Snow
Veliki kabao	1895	Dfsc	perhumid Mediterranean snowclimate	about 6250	ap. 140 days
Crkvice	940	Cfsb	(fs= without summerdryness), perhumid Mediterranean mountain climate	4926	70 days
Risan	0	Csa	(s= double winter rain season), perhumid Mediterranean coast climate	3500	2 days

* classification scheme after Köppen

Two wind systems are noteworthy for their ecological significance: Bora and Sirocco. Strong cold downslope winds of Bora type appear in winter and are most severe in the Bay of Risan. Gusts reach 250 km/h and can lead to a significant fall of temperatures in several hours with freezing events problematic for most of the Mediterranean cultures. Bora weather situations are frequent and sailors keep an eye on the mountains as cap clouds indicate an imminent Bora event. Sirocco is a warm humid rain and is important as it brings heavy rain. It appears throughout the year but is usually centered in autumn and spring.

Station	Period	Height [m]	I	II	III	IV	V	VI	VII	VIII	IX	X	XI	XII	I-XII [mm/m^{2}a]
Herceg Novi	1961–1984	40	230	221	183	135	130	73	28	45	160	181	326	262	1974
Risan	1961–1984	40	405	342	340	235	153	101	66	123	188	295	423	434	3105
Grahovo	1961–1984	710	351	324	305	251	142	94	55	103	202	416	508	473	3224
Podvrsnik	1961–1984	630	407	398	367	305	151	101	77	132	238	465	593	586	3820
Vrbanj	1961–1984	1010	472	390	388	321	181	104	70	122	224	369	565	536	3742
Knežlaz	1961–1984	620	547	472	473	373	207	120	72	136	268	400	629	661	4358
Crkvice	1961–1984	940	610	499	503	398	198	135	82	155	295	502	714	683	4774
Ivanova Korita	1960–1984	1350	434	460	742	472	128	198	74	46	94	300	694	972	4614
Goli vrh	1893–1913	1311	271	286	307	226	188	148	75	70	215	473	415	327	3129
Jankov vrh	1890–1909	1017	424	386	389	346	212	124	55	58	202	484	579	501	3750
Cetinje	1961–1984	655	434	357	367	288	164	92	72	118	209	306	489	498	3394
Grab-Zupci	1934–1960	677	333	325	257	195	183	83	59	86	173	360	447	485	2985
Trebinje	1931–1960	276	193	190	160	102	119	70	43	76	110	239	247	249	1762
Dubrovnik	1931–1960	49	147	113	102	92	79	60	24	38	97	156	213	186	1307

* monthly and yearly precipitation ranges in Dalmatia, Herzegovina and Montenegro

== Biology ==
=== Habitats ===
Mostly limestone rocks but also moraines and screes. Coastal cliffs are present at all parts of the Bay of Kotor. Many forest types can be seen of which Mediterranean deciduous evergreen don't play a significant role. Dinaric calcareous fir forests are found in several grooves on the Bijela gora but are difficult to reach. Bosnian pine forests are quite widespread on all major ridges. Virgin woodlands still exist, mainly Beech forests.

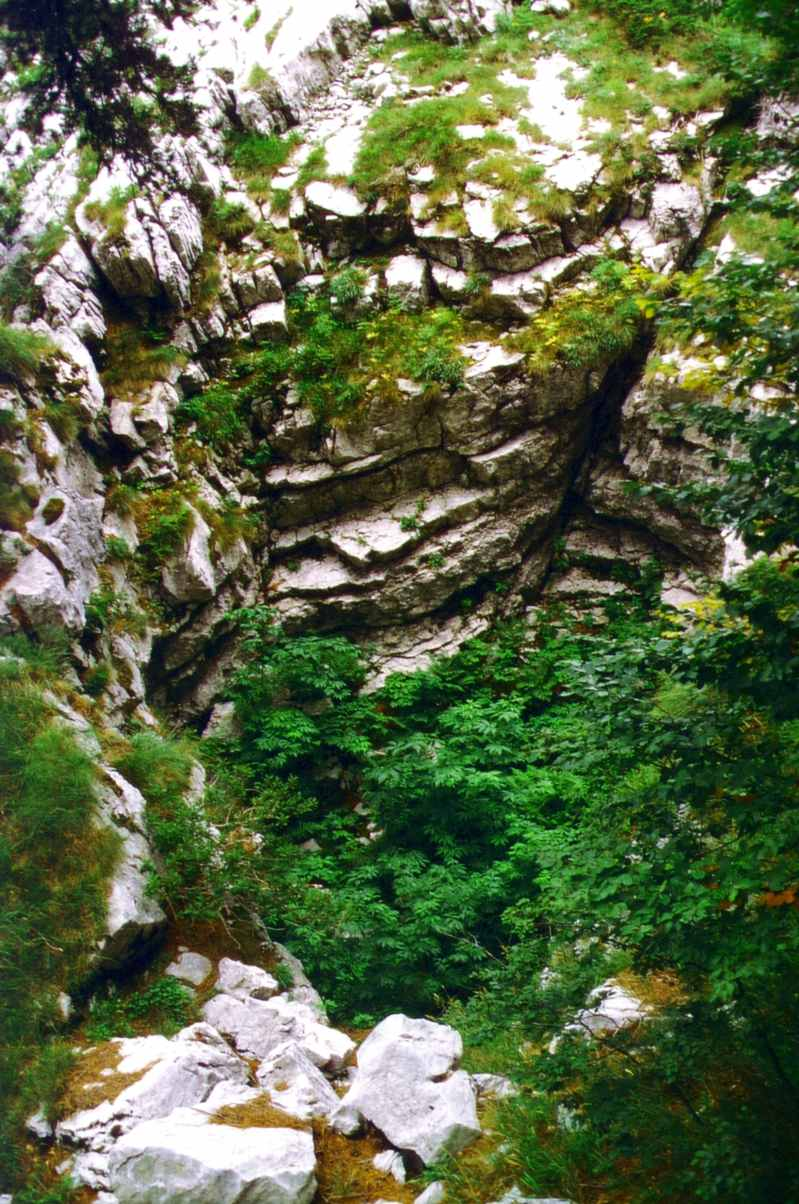
Sinkhole on Mount Orjen

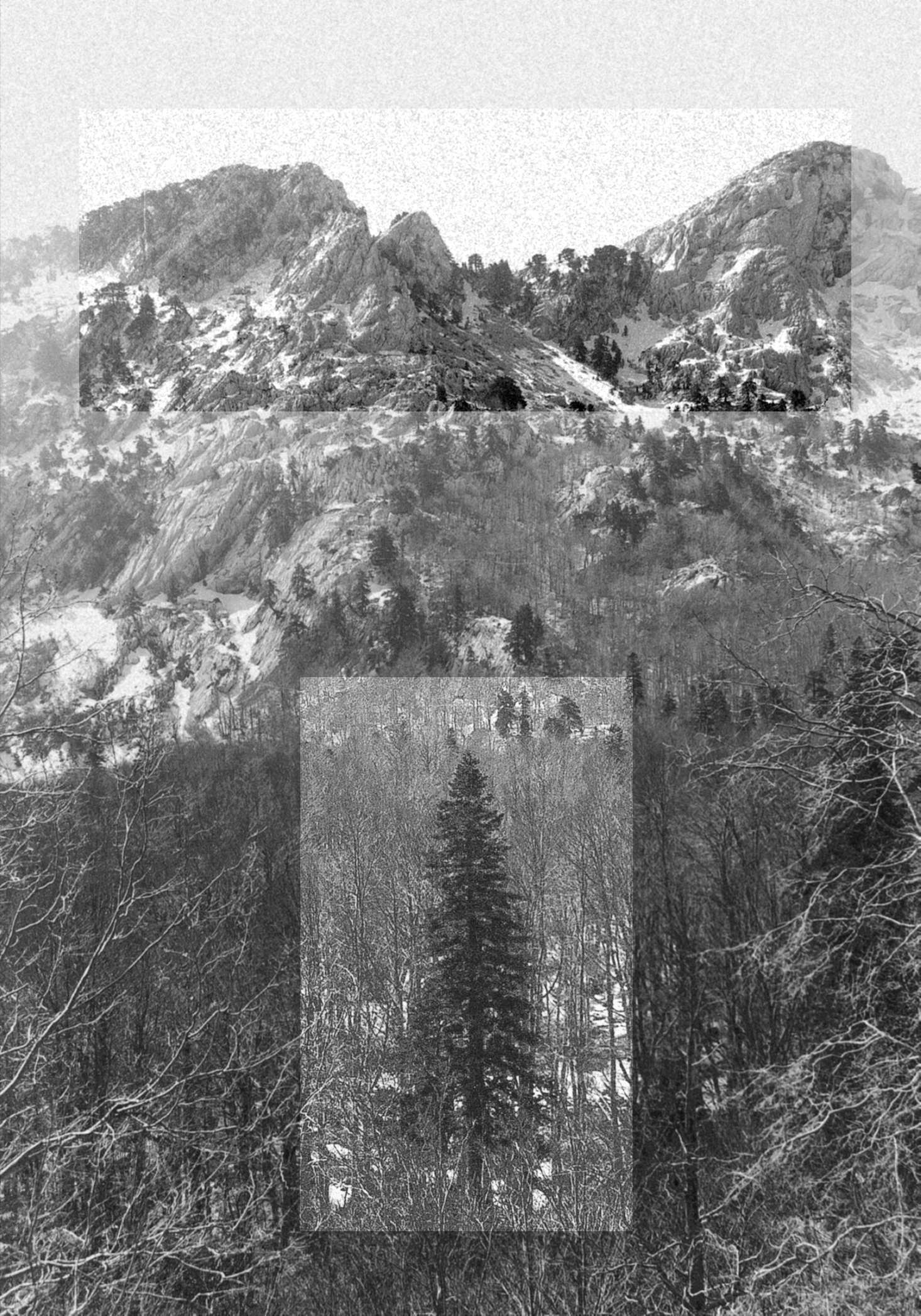
Firs are sung in local songs

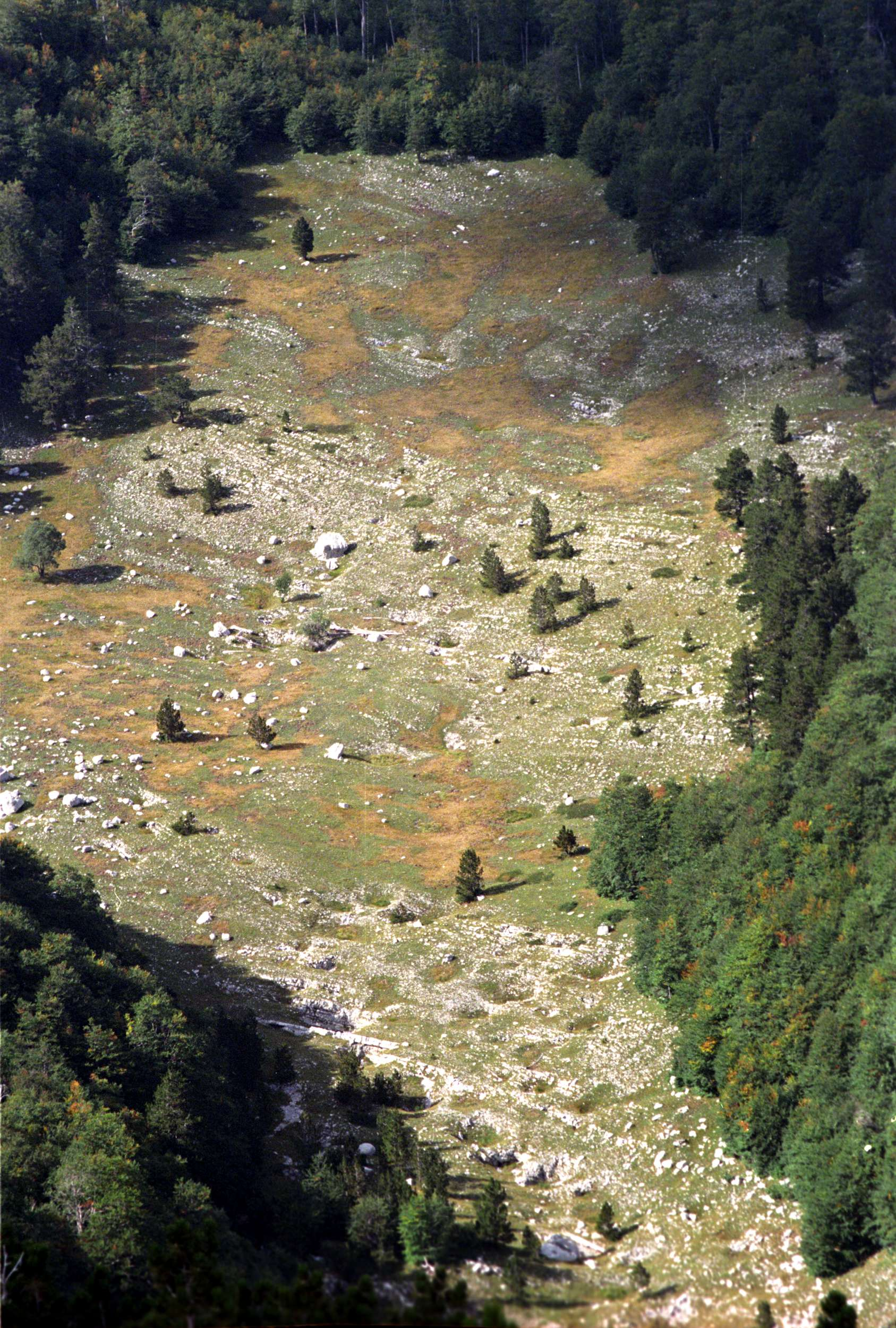
Pasture Pirina poljana

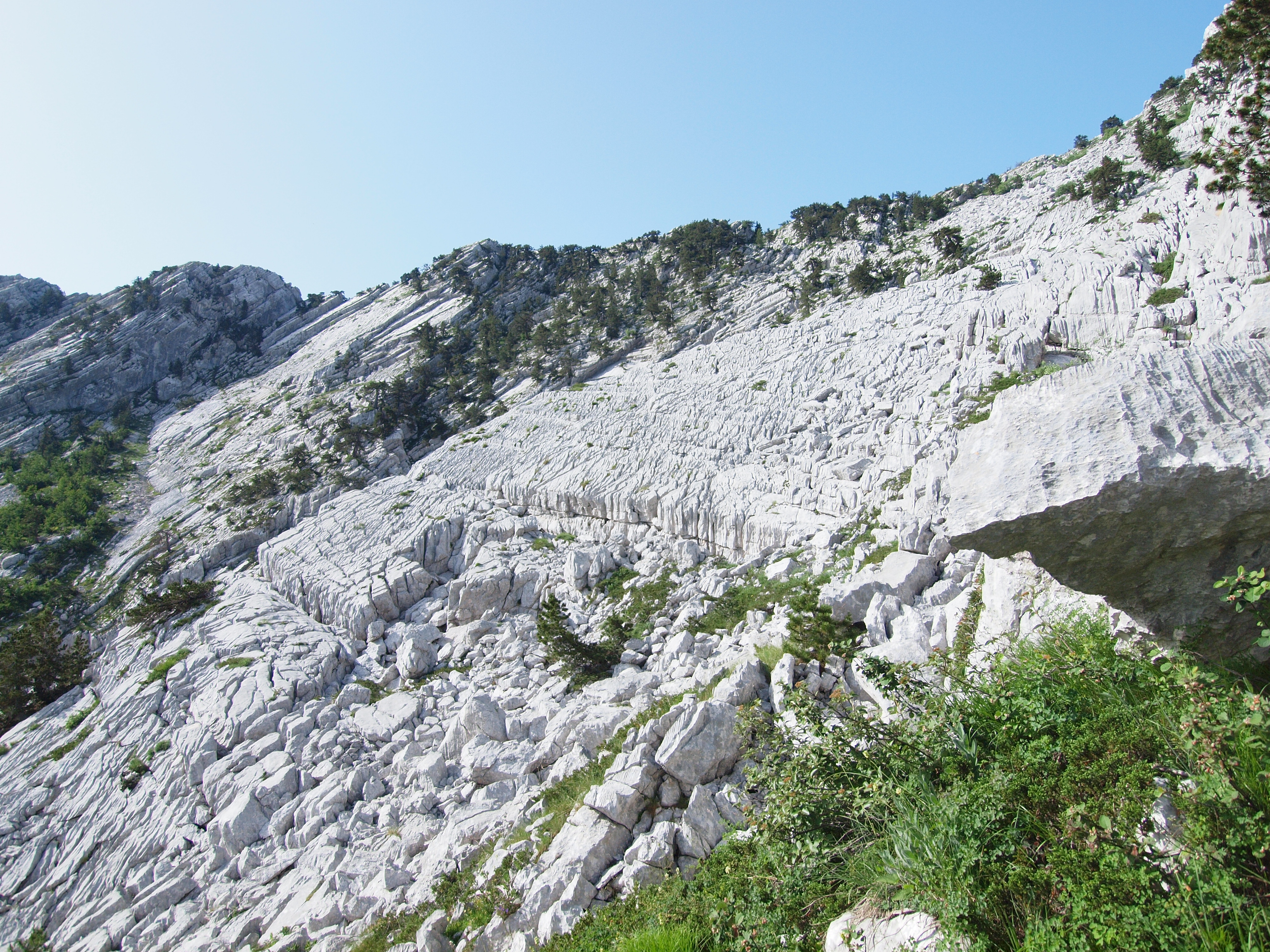
Glaciokarst features at Reovačka greda

=== Vegetation ===
Zone [m]	Type	Vegetation (Biotopes)
0- 400	Mesomediterranean ME= Meridional (subtropic belt)	Rusco-carpinetum (Ruscus aculeatus, Carpinus orientalis), Orno-Quercetum ilicis (Quercus pubescens, Quercus cerris, Juniperus communis, Quercus ilicis), Nerion oleandri (Nerium oleander)
400- 1,100	Supramediterranean SME= Suprameridinal (subtropic belt)	Quercus trojana (Quercus trojana), Carpinus orientalis (Carpinus orientalis), Petterio-Quercetum confertae (Fuk.) Lov. (Petteria, Quercus conferta), Castaneo-Quercetum pubescentis (Anic) Lov. (Castanea sativa, Quercus pubescens), Seslerio-Ostryetum carpinifoliae Horv. (Sesleria sphaerocephala, Sesleria caerulea, Ostrya carpinifolia)
1,100- 1,450	Oromediterranean NE= Nemoral (temperate zone)	Seslerio autumnalis–Fagetum (Horv.) Wrab. (Sesleria autumnalis, Fagus sylvatica), Pinion heldreichii (Pinus heldreichii), Oreoherzogio-Abietetum illyricae Fuk. (basic soil, Abies alba), Seslerio autumnalis–Abietetum illyriacae (Horv.) Fuk.
1,450- 1,700	Altimediterranean BO= Boreal (taiga zone)	Fago-Pinetum heldrecihii Jank. (Fagus sylvatica, Pinus heldreichii), Seslerio robustae-Juniperetum hemisphaericae (Hor.) Kus. (Sesleria robusta, Juniperus communis ssp. Haemispherica), Lonicero-Rhamnion Fuk. (Lonicera nigra, Lonicera alpigena, Rhamnus), Amphoricarpion neumayerii (Horv.) Lak. (Amphoricarpos neumayerii)
1,700- 1,900	Cryomediterranean AL= Alpine (tundra zone)	Trifolio Polganetalia Quéz (Trifolium), Narcisso-Gentianetum nivalis Lov. & Rac (Narcissus, Gentiana nivalis), Drabo-Androsacetalia Quéz (Draba hoppeanae, Androsace alpina), Muscaro-Scillion nivalis Quéz

- Notes:
  - The Vegetation profile on Mount Orjen shows the Mediterranean zones which vary from alpine mountain zones.
  - The few plant names are just examples of the plants belonging to the Biotope communities.
  - An example of a complete biotope plant list (Oreoherzogio-Abietetum illyricae Fuk.): Dinaric calcareous block fir forest#Plant list
  - Genus Sesleria, belongs to subfamily Pooideae, of the true grass family Poaceae.

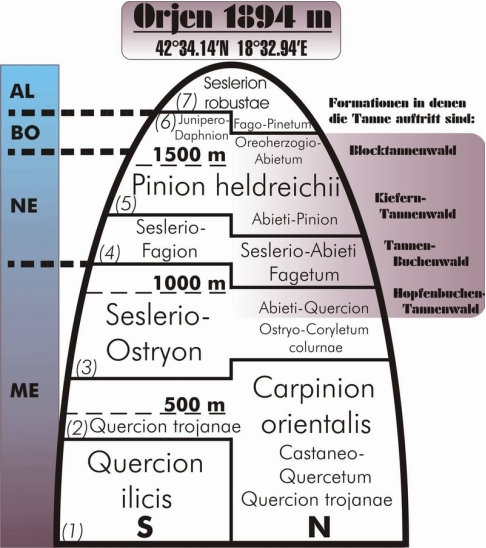
Vegetation profile on Orjen

Across Orjen vegetation varies with climate and altitude. While the sub-adriatic range exhibits evergreen deciduous forests, the vegetation graduates to temperate forests, conifers and tundra in the northern and upper regions. The ridges also have a variety of Mediterranean alpine vegetation – oromediterranean pastures. The typical karst country with bare limestone rochocks interspersed with parches of wood is found on lower altitudes. White Oak, Hop-hornbeam and Montpellier Maple, or the characteristic scrub of the maquis shrubland and garrigue are notable. There are stony meadows in the sunken dolina of the karst that contrast vividly with the stony slopes and rocky scrubland all round. Higher altitudes are characterised by heavy beech forest with occasional open grassy pastures. On northern branches silver fir accompanies beech. Above the beech and fir-beech forests are scattered open stands of pure Dinaric calcareous Silver Fir forests and Bosnian pine with deep-purple young cones set among stiff light-green needles. Open stony screes and rocks are exposed to the jagged ridges and summits. They are very rich in species.

=== Flora ===
Flora is of Balkan type with many Illyrian and Balkan endemics. Notable is local endemism with 10 endemics restricted to Mount Orjen.

=== Gallery ===
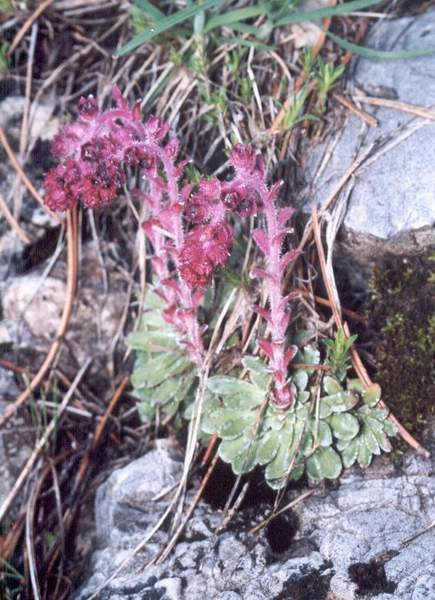
Saxifraga species

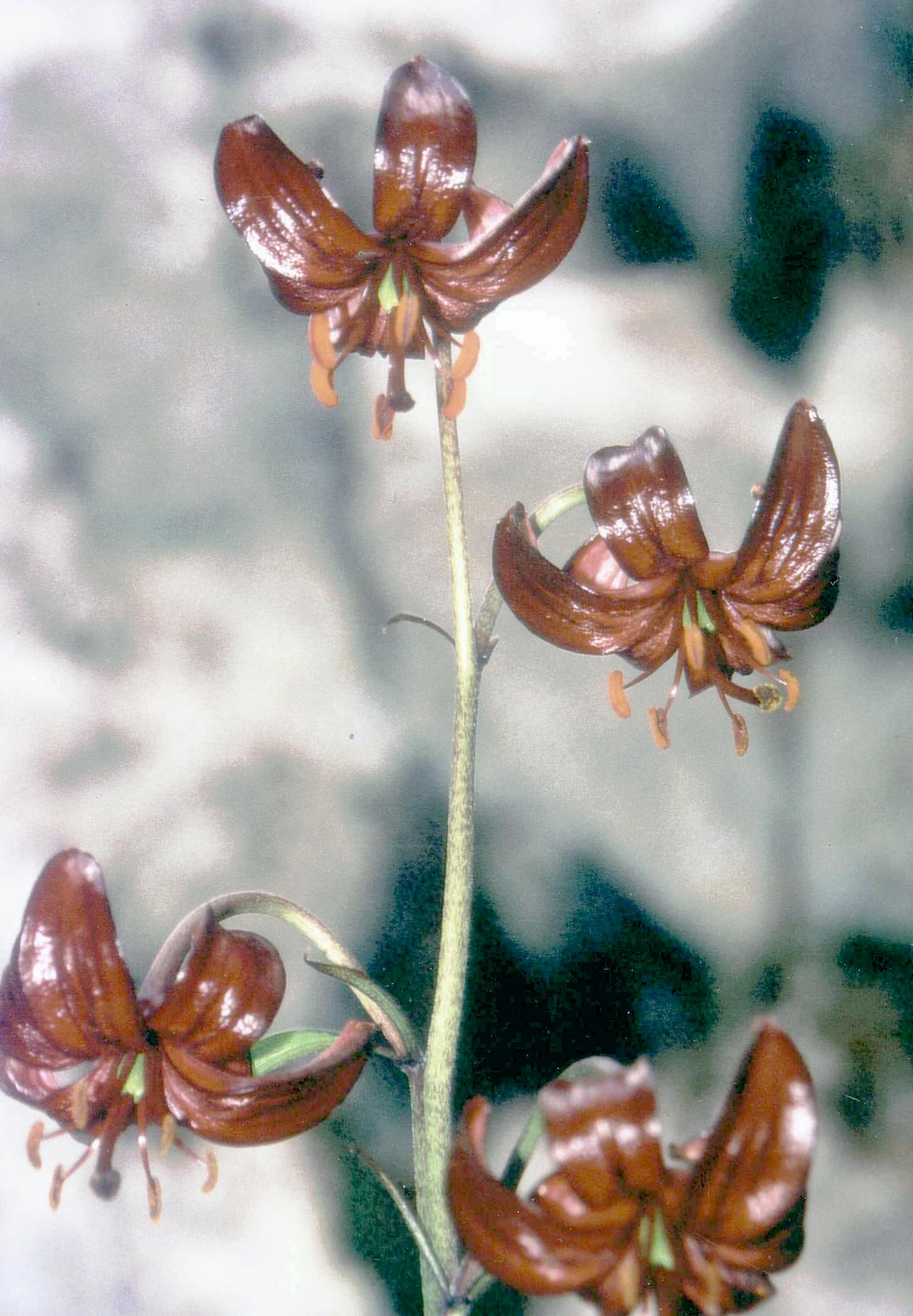
Variety of Martagon lily

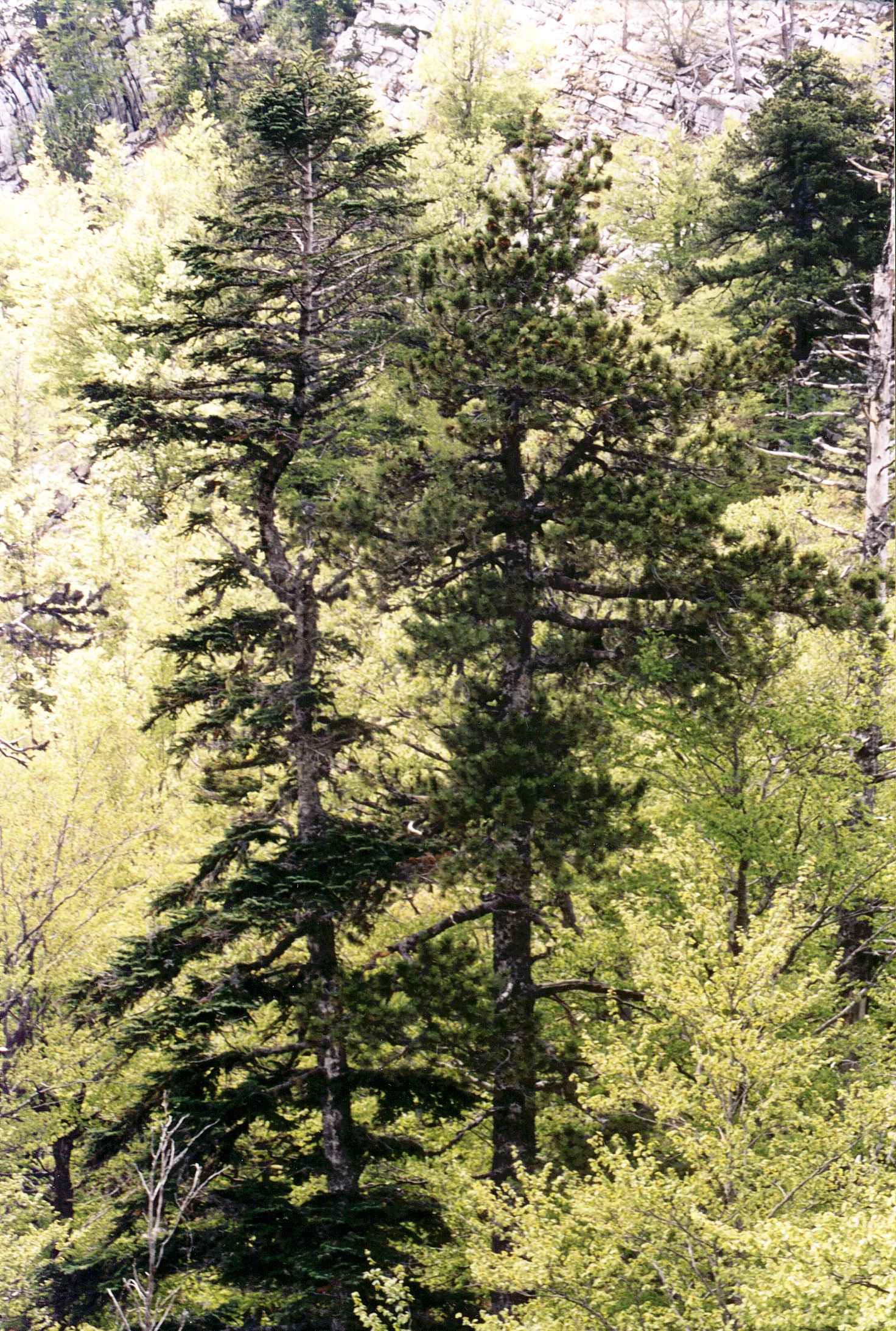
Silver fir and Bosnian pine

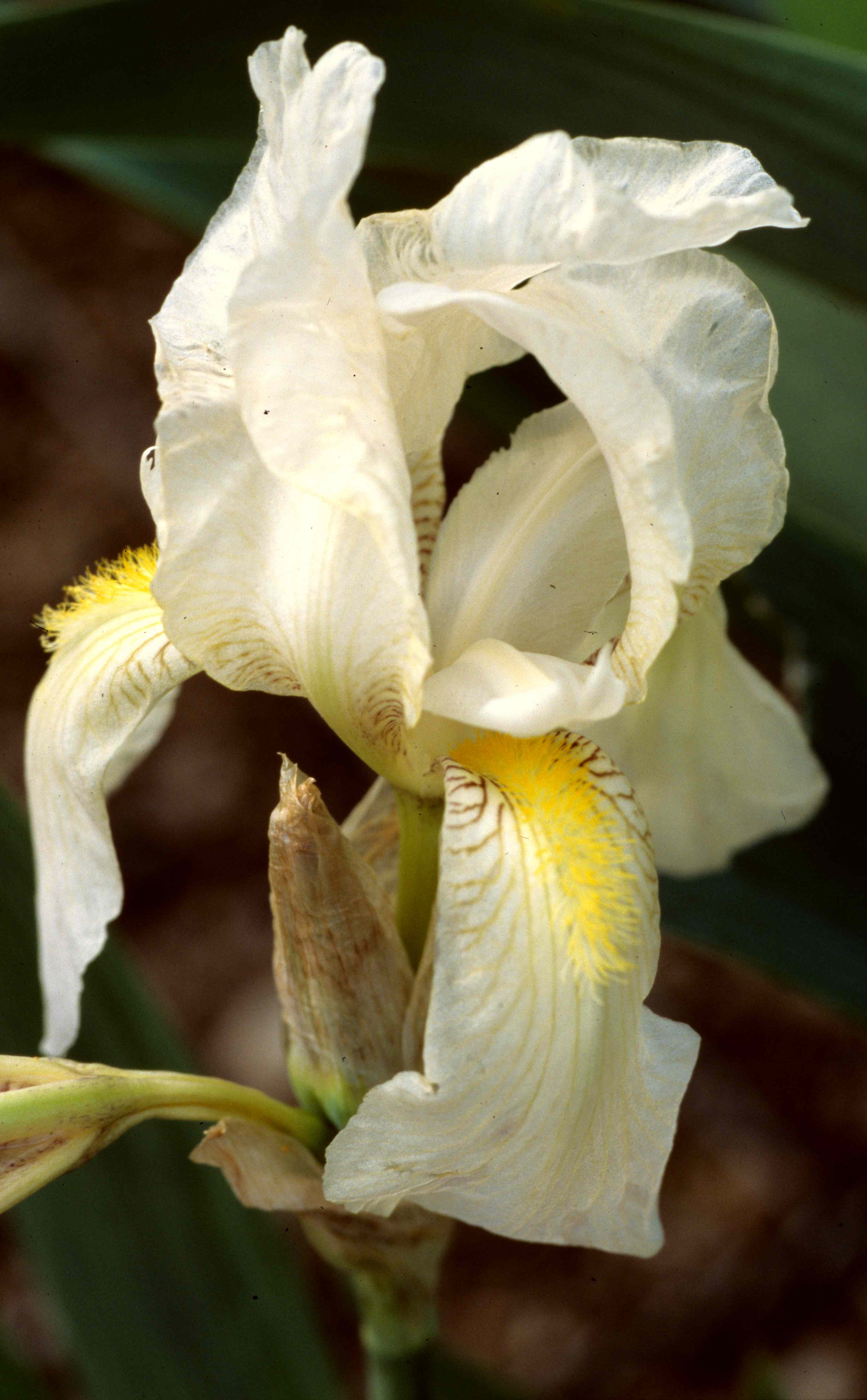
Iris orjenii is endemic to altimediterrranean pastures on Orjen

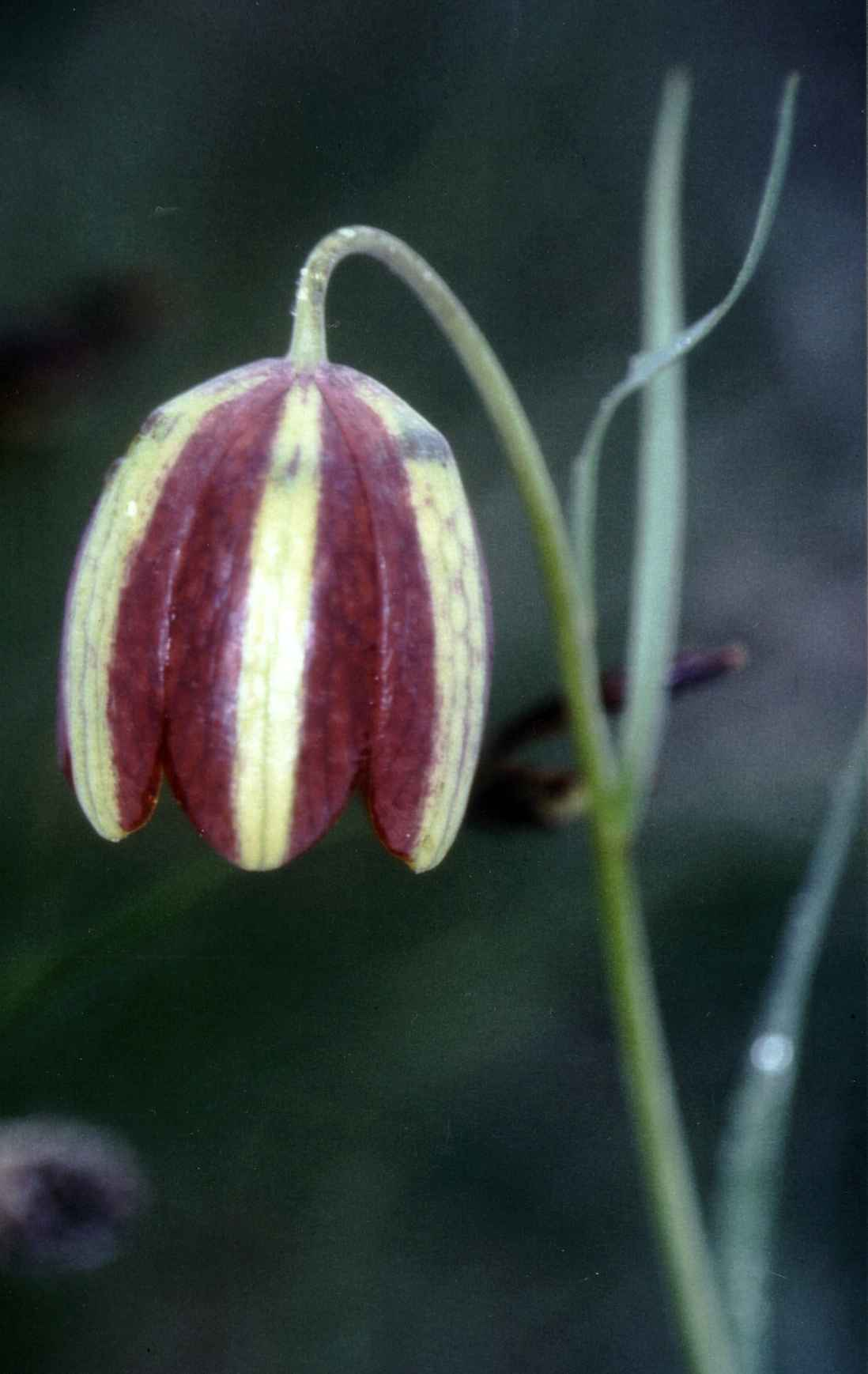
Variety F. gracilis is common in the altimediterranean lifezone

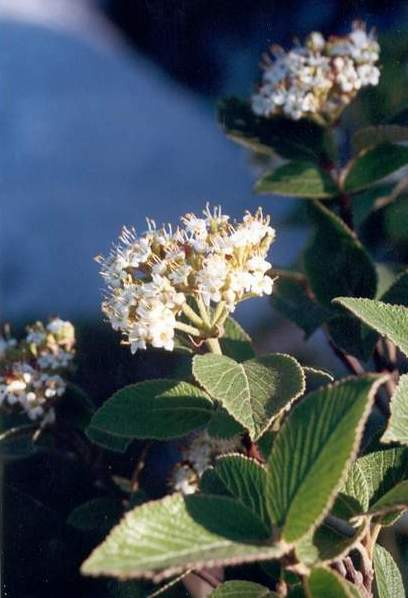
Viburnum maculatum endemic snowball from Orjen

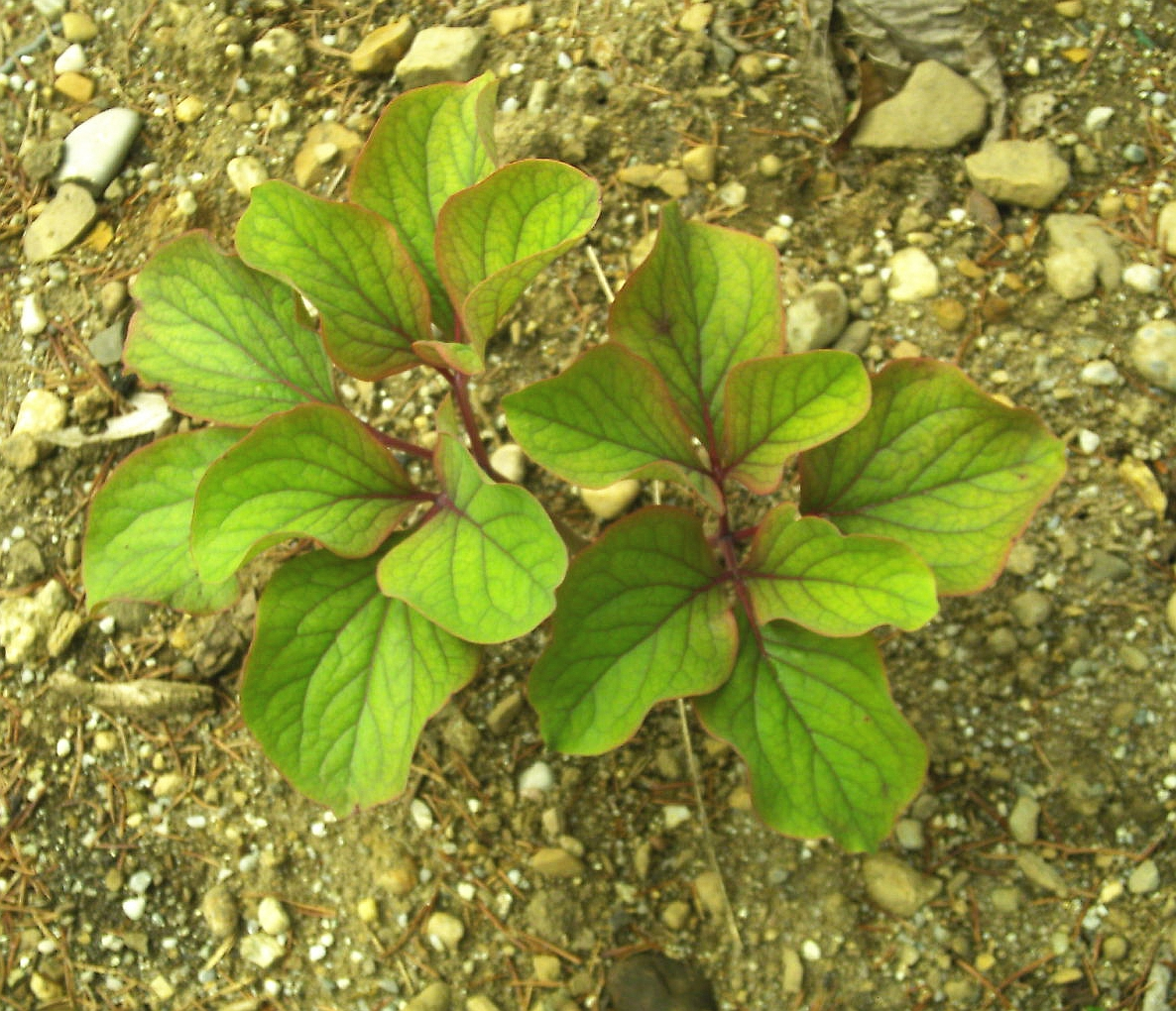
Very rare Paeonia daurica

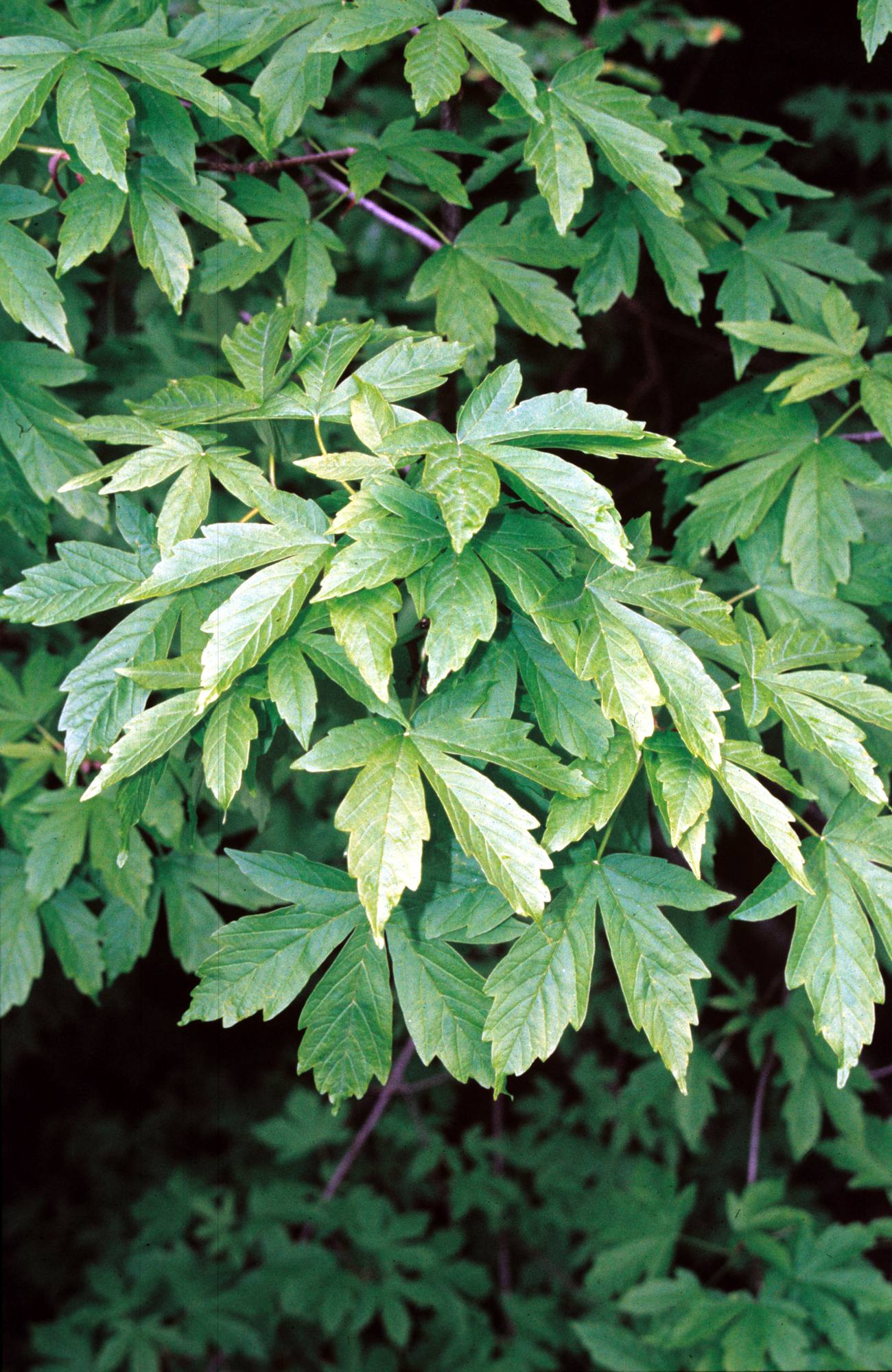
Acer heldreichii subendemic Greek Maple

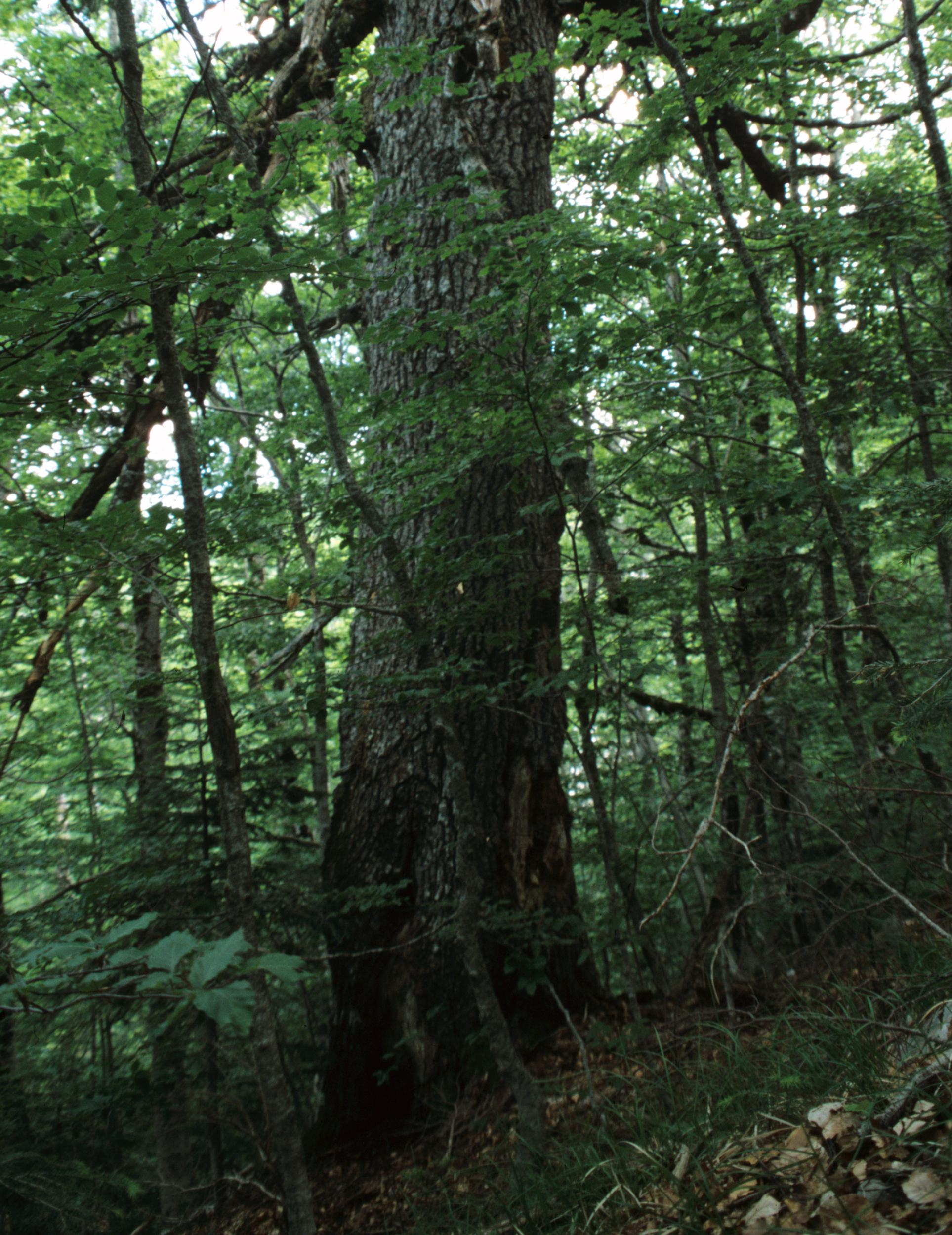
A fir tree in the range

=== Conservation ===
A National Park was planned for a long time on Orjen. The disintegration of Yugoslavia, civil war and standstill of tourism cancelled plans. Today plans have rejuvenated but funding may be a problem. UNESCO declared the Natural and Culturo-Historical Region of Kotor a World Heritage site. The part of Orjen within the boundaries of this site is namely the Krivosije plateaux. A further evaluation of the patrimony and nomination of a greater part of Orjen as a national park is needed. Unique flora, fauna and relief certainly require a protection plan by administrative action.

== History ==
The earliest historic confirmations are the Lipce rock paintings which are dated in the Bronze Age. The first historic significant events are connected with the Illyrians when Queen Teuta, reigned approximately from 231 BC to 228 BC choose Risan as her capital during her war against the Romans. The Greek also colonised the region and eventually the Romans took over. The classical name of the Bay of Kotor is after Rhizon (Risan) Sinus Rhizonicus. Eventually Kotor was becoming more important during the Middle Ages

=== People ===
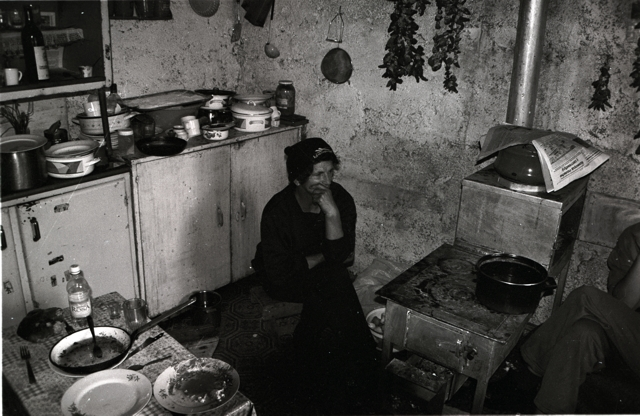
Shepherds on Orjen. Dried mushrooms decorate the walls in this hut

Only few traditional shepherds live today on Orjen. Mostly remain on the northern side of the Bijela gora. They have their local songs describing life on the remote mountain and every year in July a great feast takes place when all the shepherds from Bijela gora come together to sing dance and eat on a pasture at Ledenik.

Livestock is mostly sheep but also horses and few cattle are held. At Orjen saddle oxen graze. In former times nomadic migration took place between the poljes and the higher regions of Orjen. The traditional housing on Orjen is the so-called Koliba. Small limestone huts with roofs build of pine bark. Only few hamlets are inhabited, mostly close to the coast. The higher up the stronger the push factors acted to leave. Tribes on Orjen were once renowned for their wildness and still people from the coast have this notion towards the mountain tribes.

== Activities ==
Glacial and karst features compose a unique landscape for the region. Local groups offer opportunities for hiking, mountaineering, and speleological activities including cave exploration. Three mountain huts are established and enthusiasts routinely engage in winter sports.

=== Hiking ===
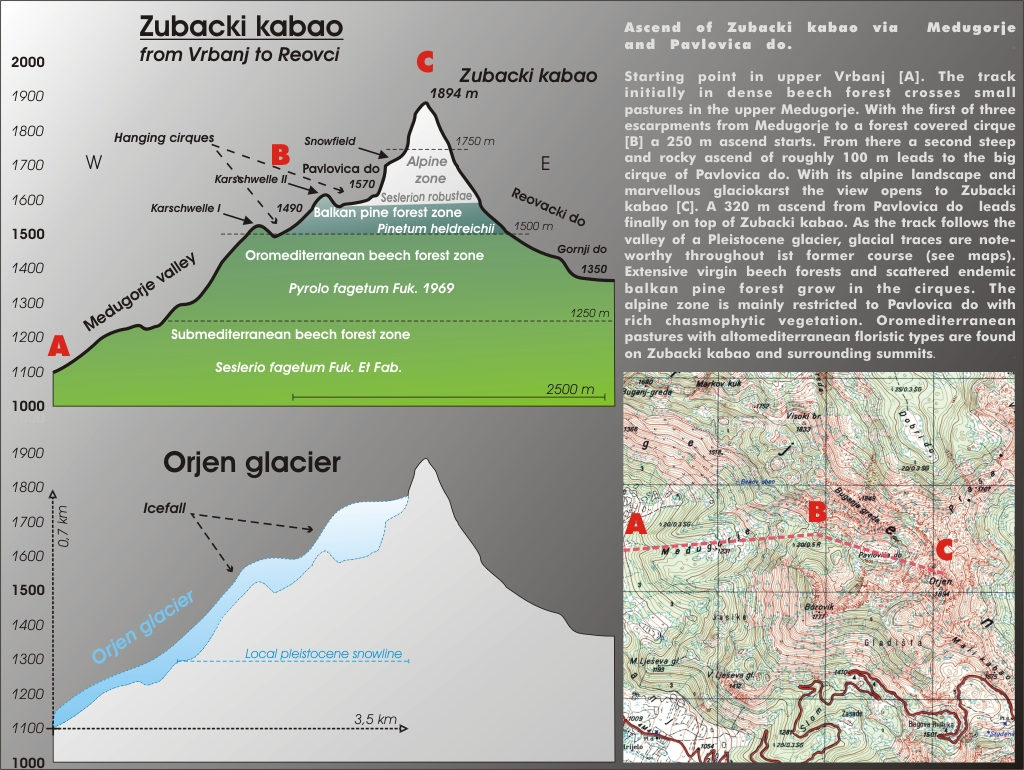
Ascend on Orjen via the Medugorje valley

Trails are maintained by the PSD Subra mountaineering association from Herceg Novi. Most trails are around the huts at Vratlo (1160 m) and Orjen ridge (1594 m). 40 km of marked trails exist in the Mount Orjen region, leading to the most attractive destinations. Marked trails start at the city bus station at Herceg Novi (30 m) and lead to the Vratlo hut (1160 m). Hiking in other more remote parts is also possible but no marcation currently exists. Visitors of Bijela gora or Dobri can use several local forest roads. sometimes shepherds can offer night accommodation.

Water is only available at some places, shepherd villagers usually use rain collectors. Most hikers tend to visit Subra (1680 m) or Veliki kabao (1895 m). Both are well marked.

Brown bears appear in the Bijela gora and should not be disturbed as the population is critically endangered.

Every year around mid May a half marathon called Orjen marathon is organised by the PSD Subra alpine organization. Guests are welcomed to take part in the traditional manifestation

=== Climbing ===
Several alpine-like climbing possibilities like rock climbing exist, notably the 500 m wall of the Subra amphitheatre. In last few years the alpine–speleo section (A.S.O.S.) of PSD Subra started to climb routes on Mount Orjen. Some climbing routes are only 10 minutes walk from the Vratlo mountain hut. Other climbing routes are in Subra's Amphitheatre and Reovacka Greda rocks. Mount Orjen gives many opportunities for climbing unclimbed routes with various difficulties.

Major Peaks
Peak	Height (m)	Character	Difficulty
Veliki kabao	1,894	rock scramble, wall, scree	difficult north approach, alpine character, scree on east
Velika Jastrebica	1,865	trail	easy trail
Buganja greda	1,849	rock scramble, scree	basic rock scramble, difficult slippery scree on north side
Visoki brijeg	1,833	rock scramble, scree, trail	basic rock scramble, scree on north
Vučji zub	1,805	rock scramble scree, wall	scree on east, difficult rock crevices on north
Borovik	1,777	rock scramble, scree	difficult scree on north,
Međugorje	1,769	rock scramble, wall	difficult major wall from north, south and west
Goliševac	1,721	rock scramble, scree	difficult scrre from north
Markov kuk	1,721	rockscramble, trail, scree	basi scramble
Pazua	1,680	rock scramble, wall	difficult rock scramble
Subra	1,679	rock scramble, big wall	500 m wall still unclimbed

=== Summer activities ===
- Backpacking – Between late spring and early fall. All overnight trips into the back country require sufficient water supplies due to limited water sources available.
- Bicycling – Mountain biking is possible throughout Mount Orjen and local roads are well suited for cycling.
- Swimming – Orjen is located near the Bay of Kotor on the Adriatic coast.
- Orjen marathon – Annual sport event with several possible tracks, starting from the Vratlo mountain hut towards Subra (1679m) and Veliki kabao (1895m) peaks.

=== Winter activities ===
Much of Mount Orjen is inaccessible due to heavy snow in winter. However, Orjen saddle 1594 m can be reached in winter from Vrbanj.

- Skiing – the only skiing area is around Orjen saddle opens in winter. No lifts and equipment are provided at the mountain hut.
- Hunting – Hunters are generally welcome official permits are required.

== Mountain huts ==
In the 1935–1936 season, the mountain hut on Orjenska Lokva, at 1,594 metres (5,230 ft) in elevation, saw 445 visitors, including 19 German, 16 Czechoslovak, 14 English, 5 Austrian and 3 Polish citizens. In the 1936–1937 season, it saw 225 visitors, including 20 Czechoslovak, 14 English, 11 Austrian, 9 German and 1 Polish citizens. In the 1937–1938 season it saw 167 visitors, including 4 Austrian and 3 Italian citizens.
