= Borovi do =

Pan shaped sinkhole in Montenegro

- Борови до
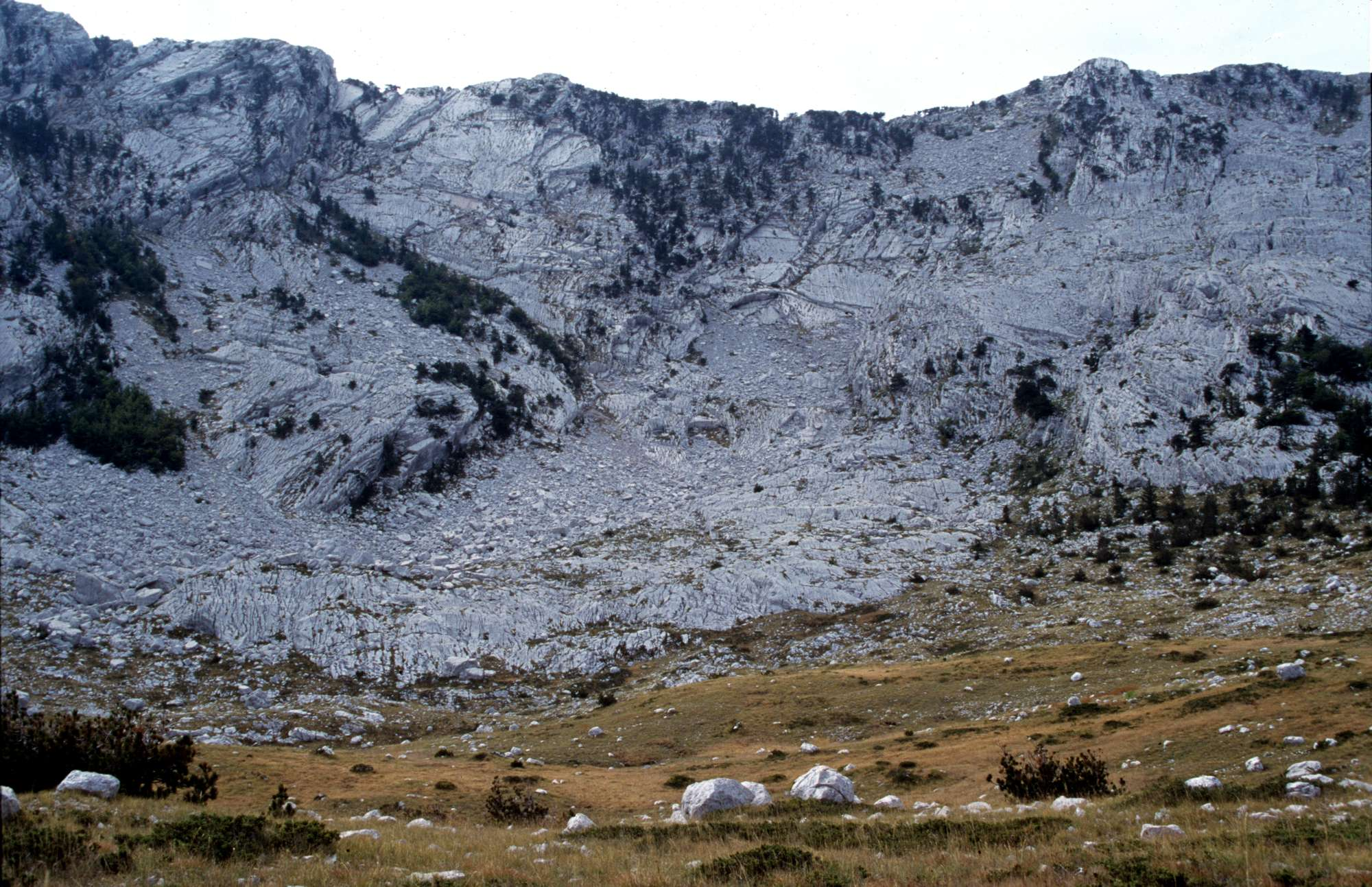

Highest point
- Elevation: 1,470 m (4,820 ft)
- Coordinates: 42°34′58.5″N 18°34′12.1″E

Geography
- Location within Montenegro
- Location: Montenegro
- Parent range: Orjen

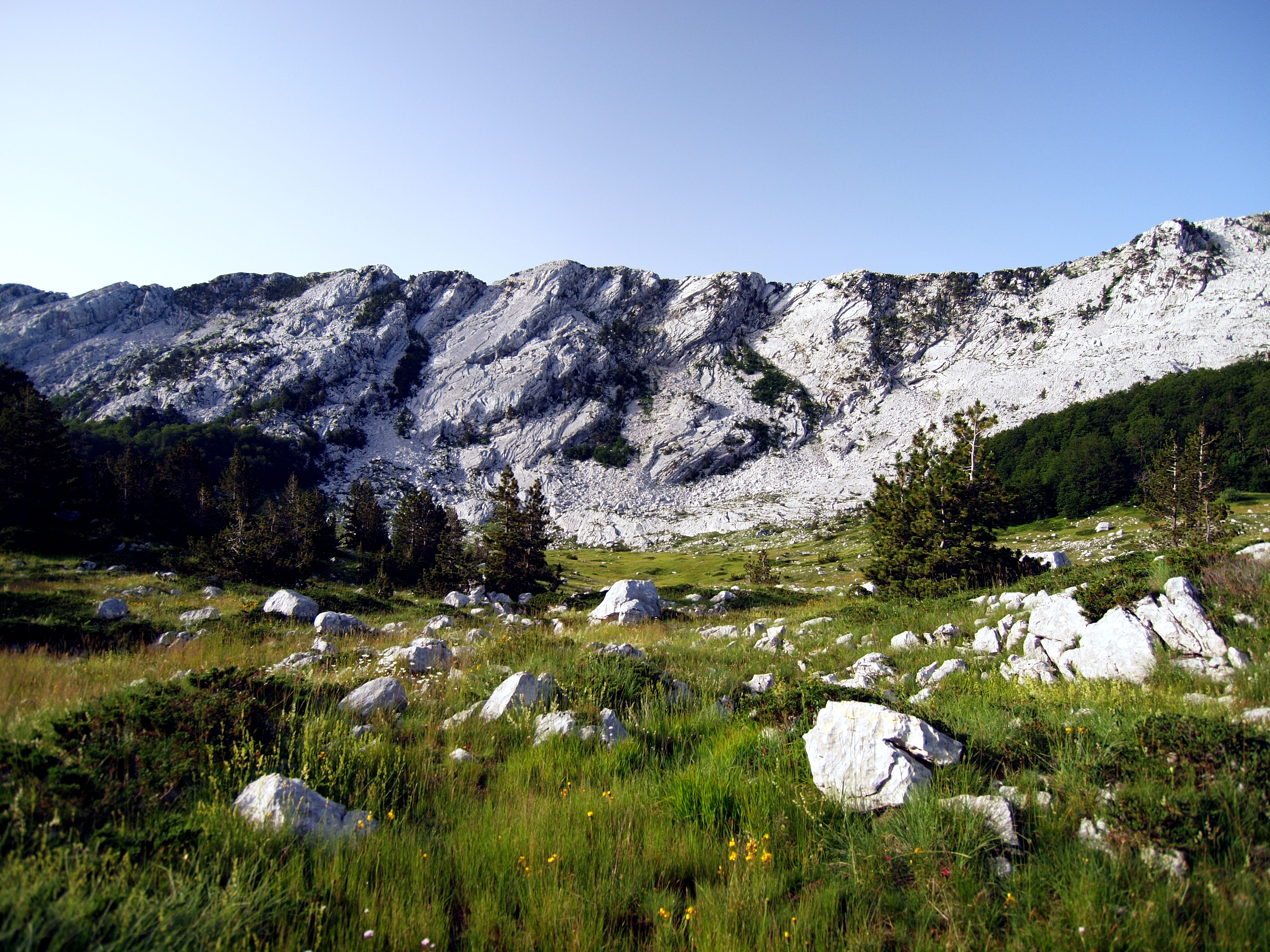
Borovi do

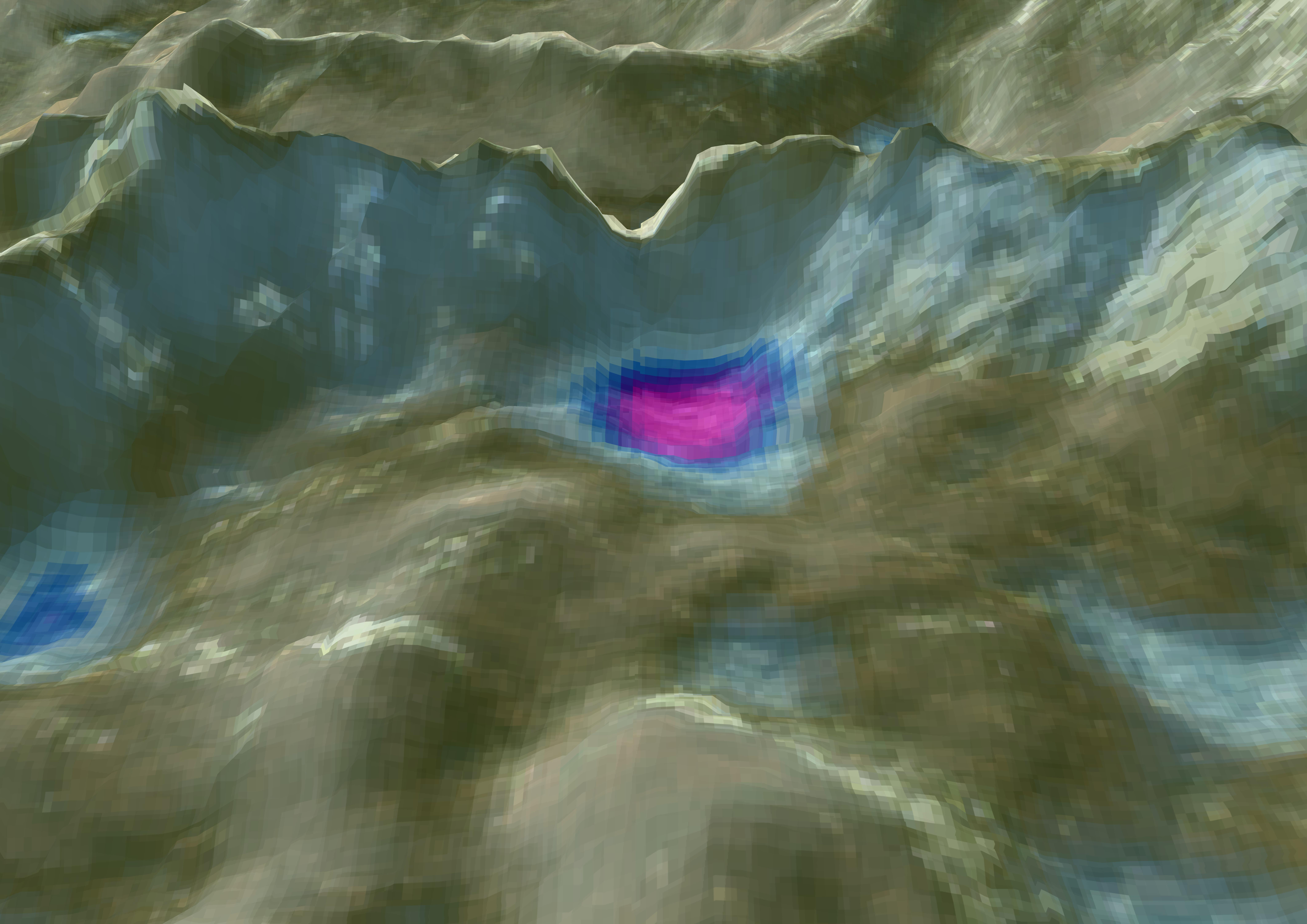
Cold Air Pool as of Dec 7th 1996

The Borovi do is a pan-shaped sinkhole on Orjen at 1470 mm AA. It lies to the north of the Reovačka greda col on the Bijela gora plateau. During the glacial stages of the Pleistocene, the Borovi do was heavily glacierized. It formed the central part of the huge Orjen ice-cap. With ice reaching approximately 430 m thickness, several short valley glaceriers were formed at the margin of the ice-cap. The Borovi do has a remarkable microclimate as it sustains a major cold-air pool for the whole of the Dinaric mountain range. Analysis revealed, that during the January 2017 European cold wave, the cold-air lake that formed in the Borovi do was amongst the coldest spots in Montenegro.

Naturally the vegetation has adapted to the frequent freeze-thaw cycles during the colder seasons. It is the lowest place in the Dinarides, where the arcto-alpine species Oxytropis campestris agg. thrives.
