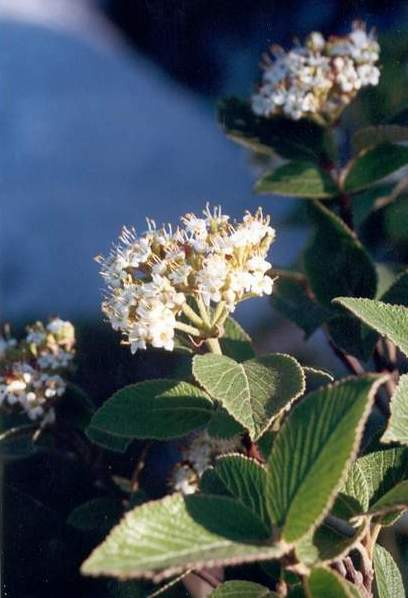

Conservation status
- Data Deficient (IUCN 2.3)

Scientific classification
- Kingdom: Plantae
- Clade: Embryophytes
- Clade: Tracheophytes
- Clade: Spermatophytes
- Clade: Angiosperms
- Clade: Eudicots
- Clade: Asterids
- Order: Dipsacales
- Family: Viburnaceae
- Genus: Viburnum
- Species: V. maculatum

Binomial name
- Viburnum maculatum Pant.

= Viburnum maculatum =

Species of flowering plant

Viburnum maculatum (locally known as Orjenska hudika) is a species of plant in the family Viburnaceae. It is found in Montenegro on Lovćen and Orjen mountains, as well as in parts of Bosnia and Herzegovina. This plant is a xerophyte, and grows on karst mountain terrains.
