= Velika Jastrebica =

Mountain in Montenegro

Coordinates: 42°35′52″N 18°32′38″E

Velika Jastrebica (trans. "great she-hawk") is the highest summit of the Bijela Gora plateaux in the north of the Orjen range, and the second highest peak after Zubački kabao.

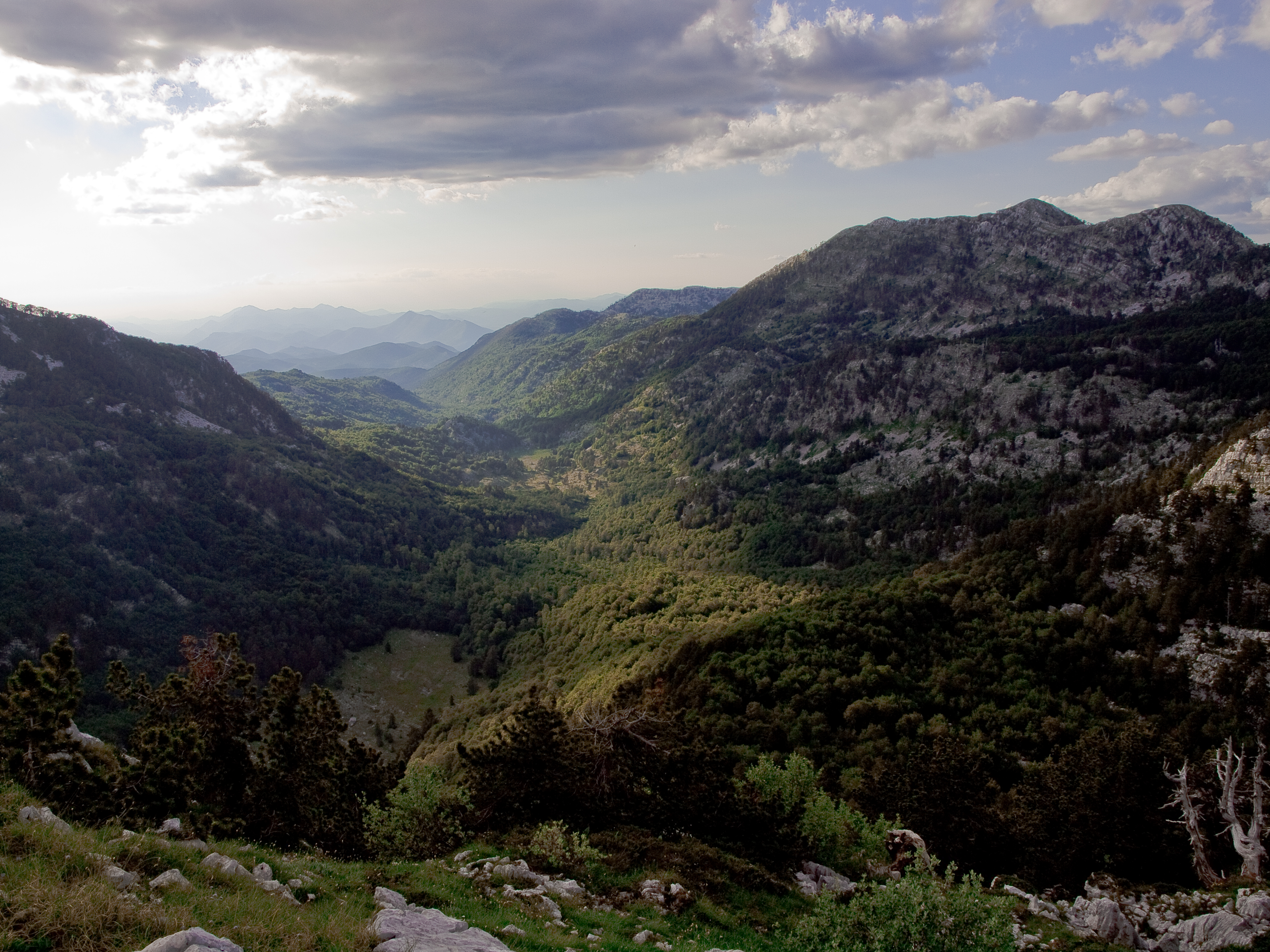
