= Vučji zub =

Mountain in southern Europe

Coordinates: 42°34′52″N 18°33′13″E

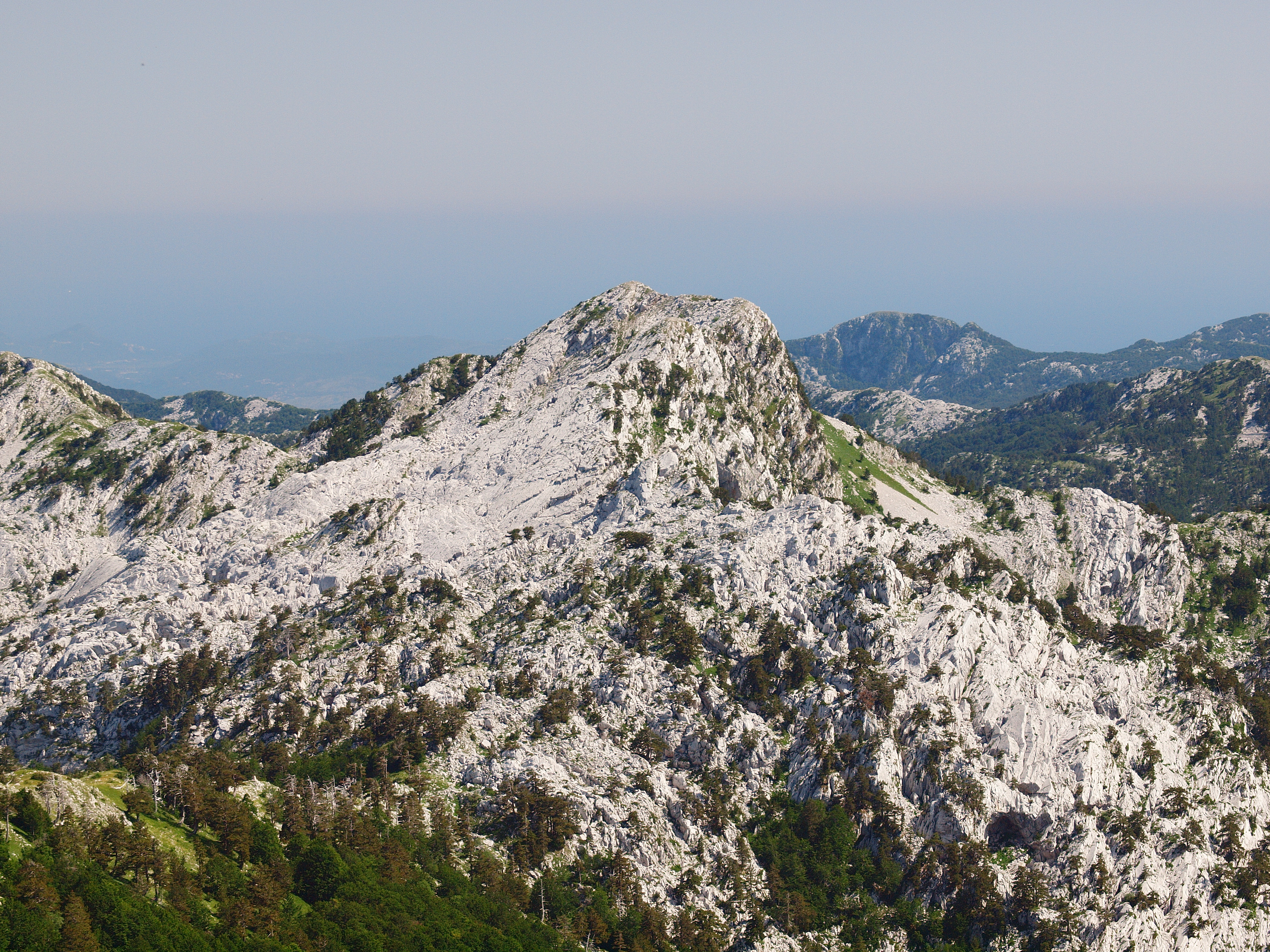
Vučji zub from the Bijela gora (Original text: 24.05.2002 recorded in the Orjen)

Vučji zub (transl. "Wolf's tooth") is at 1,805 metres (5,922 ft) one of the higher peaks in the Orjen massif in the Balkans in southern Europe.

The boundary between the Ottoman Empire, Austro-Hungarian Empire and the principality of Montenegro ran across Vučji zub until 1879. Vučji zub is still today the border stone between Montenegro and Bosnia and Herzegovina.

Vučji zub resembles a horn and is an interesting climbing destination in the Orjen range.

== See also ==
- Orjen
