= Veliki Kabao =

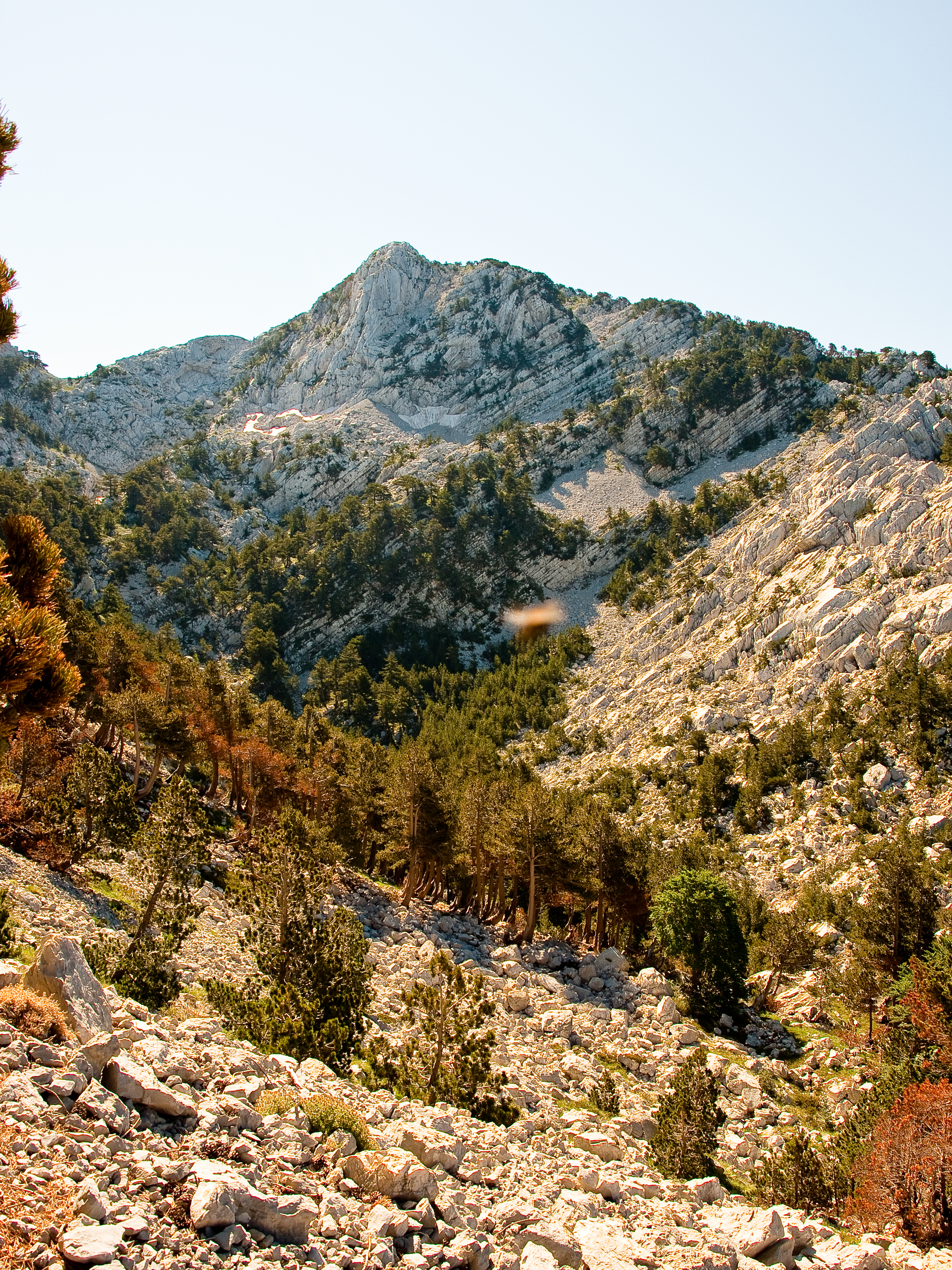
- Veliki Kabao in June

Highest point
- Elevation: 1,894 m (6,214 ft)
- Prominence: 1,035 m (3,396 ft)
- Listing: Ribu
- Coordinates: 42.5743447°N 18.5406733°E

Geography
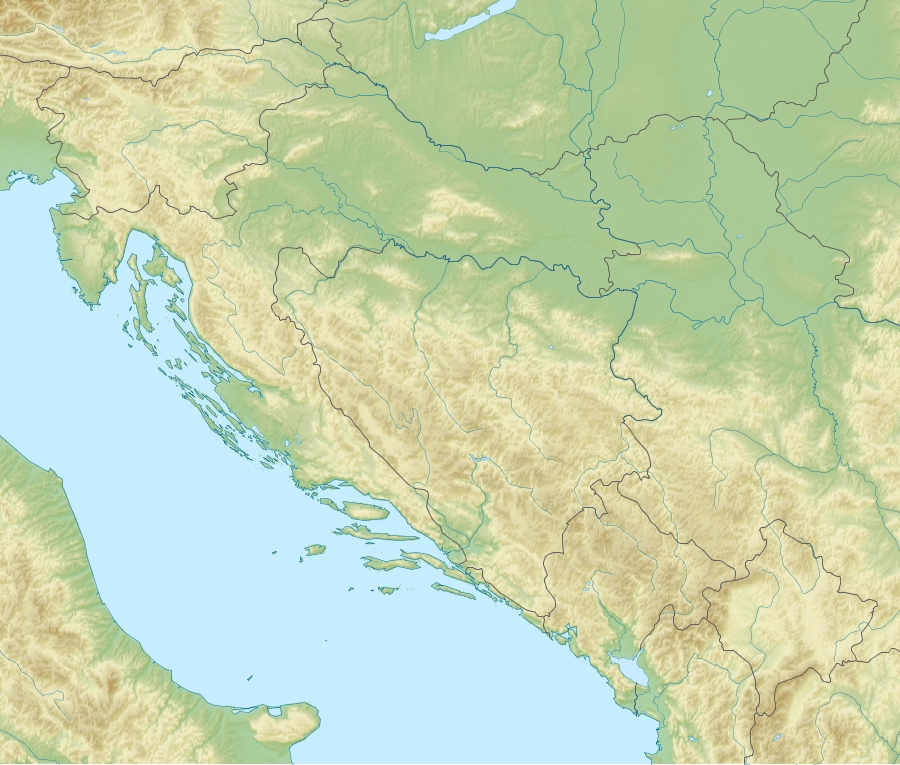
- Location within Dinaric Alps Location within Bosnia and Herzegovina Location within Montenegro
- Location: Bosnia and Herzegovina and Montenegro
- Parent range: Orjen

Veliki Kabao (Serbian Cyrillic: Велики Кабао, pronounced [velikiː kǎbaɔ]), also known as Zubački Kabao (Serbian Cyrillic: Зубачки Кабао), or simply Mount Orjen, is a mountain peak on the border of Bosnia and Herzegovina and Montenegro. At 1,894 m, it is the highest summit of the Orjen Range in the Dinaric Alps. It is also the highest peak of the eastern Adriatic.

Marked trail to Zubački Kabao from the Orjen Saddle is the oldest mountaineering trail in Montenegro. It was constructed during the 1880s by the Austro-Hungarian Army led by general Varešanin, in preparation for the visit of Prince Rudolf who made the ascent to the peak in 1886.

From Veliki Kabao views spread across the surrounding Dinaric range, as far as Trebinje and Popovo field, the Bay of Kotor and the Adriatic coast, and inland as far as Durmitor, while to the south-east lies the Skadar Lake and the mountains of Albania.

== Gallery ==
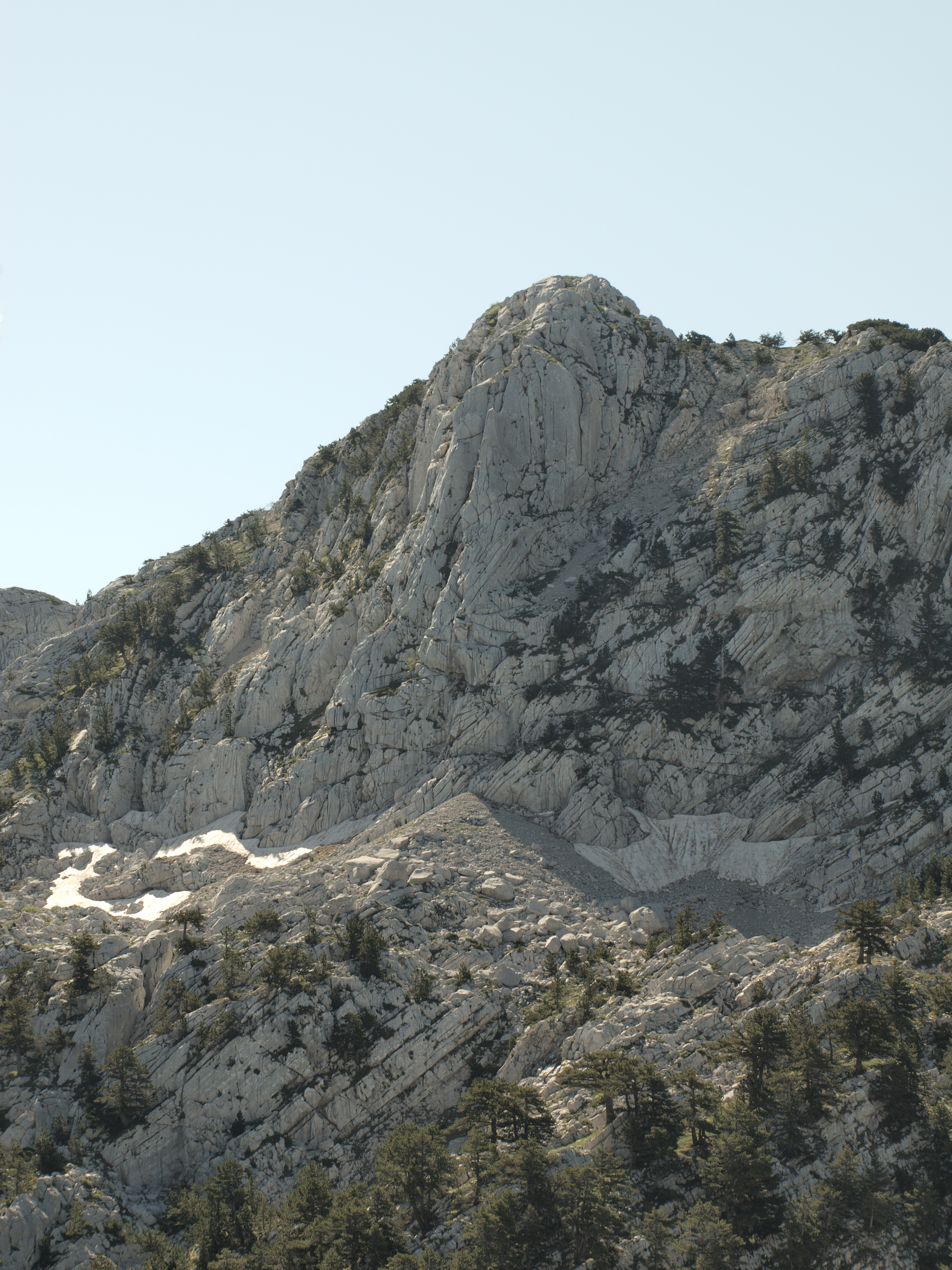
View of the summit

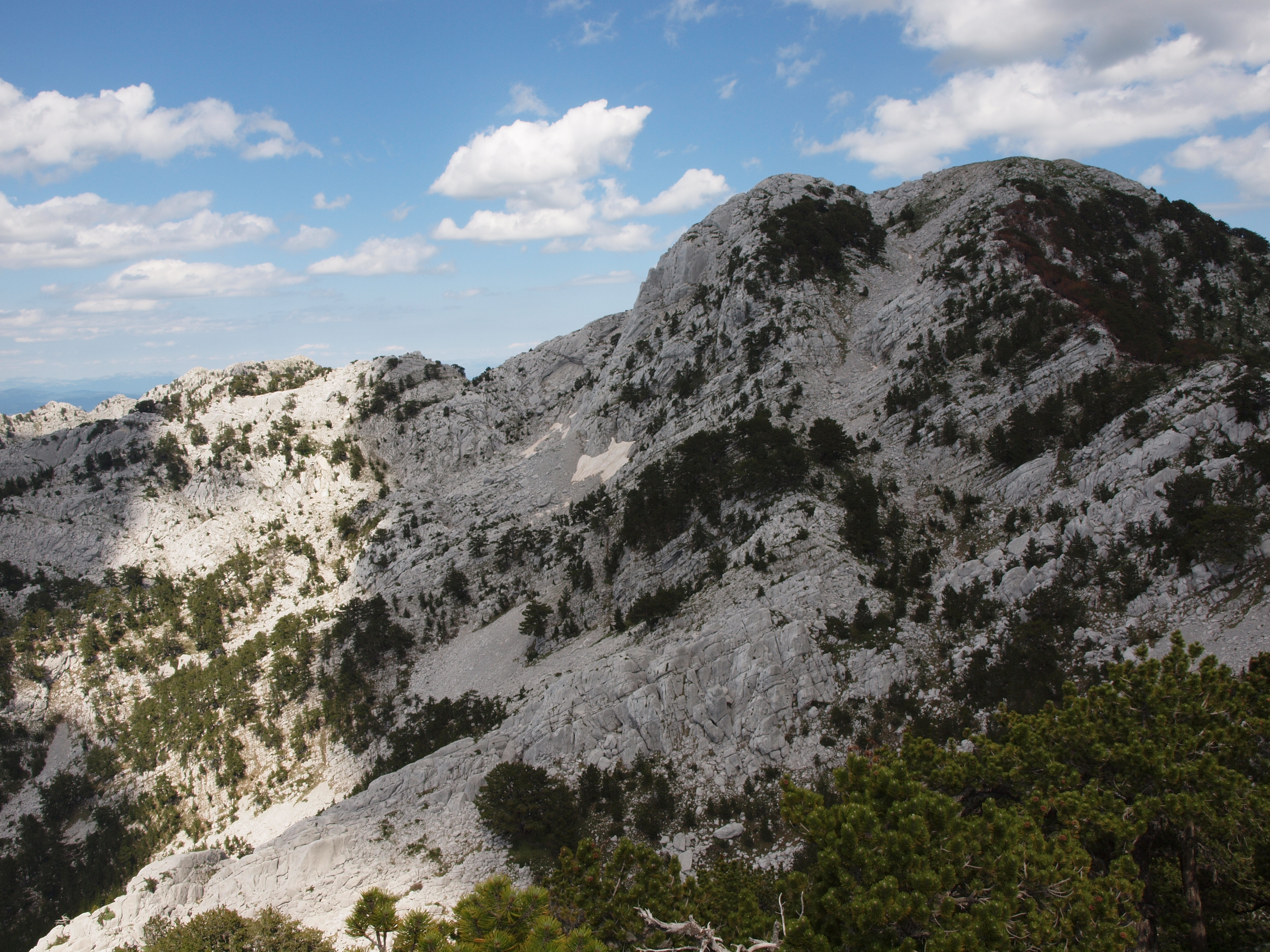
North-west cirque of Veliki kabao

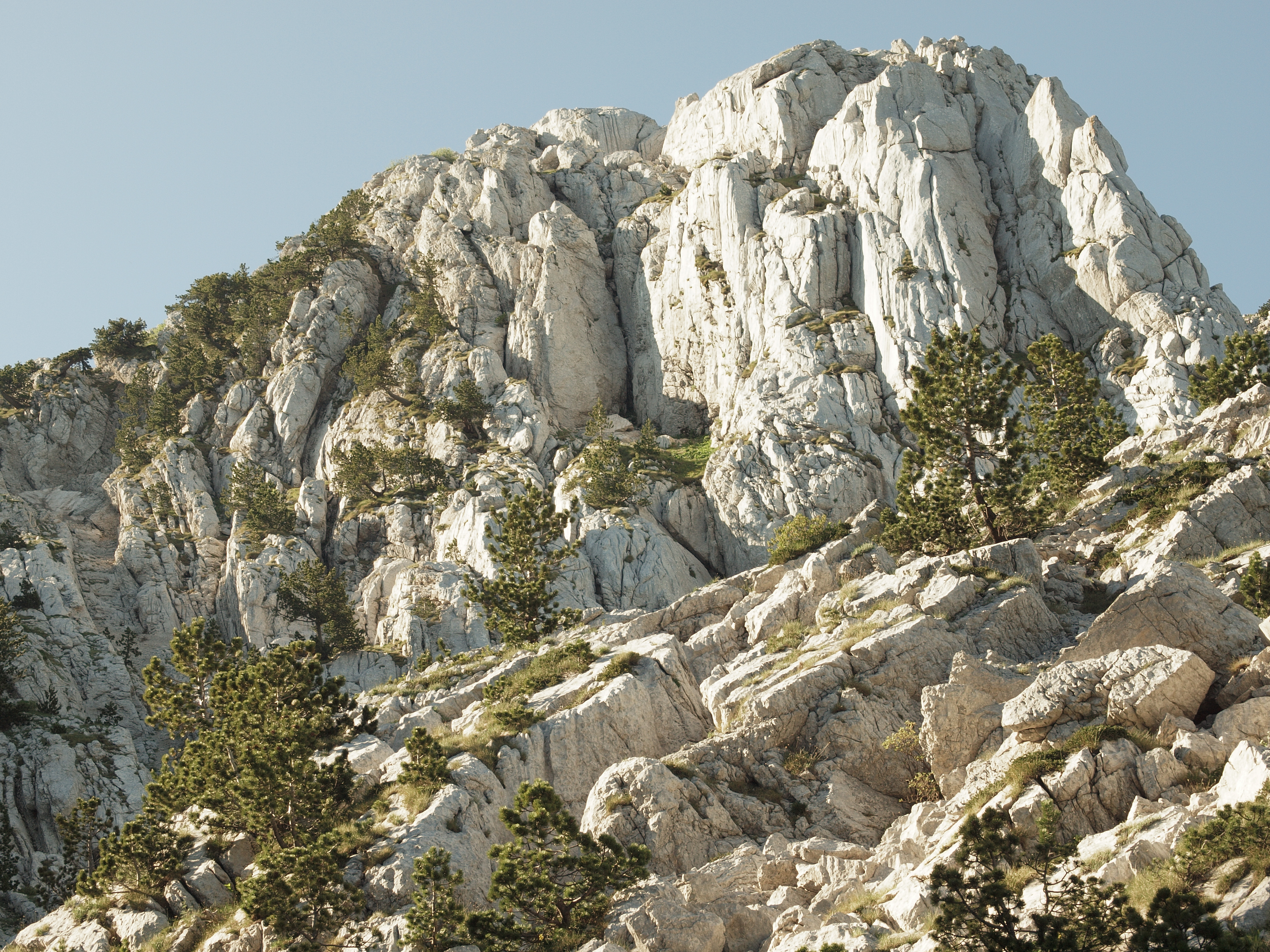
Closeup view of the summit

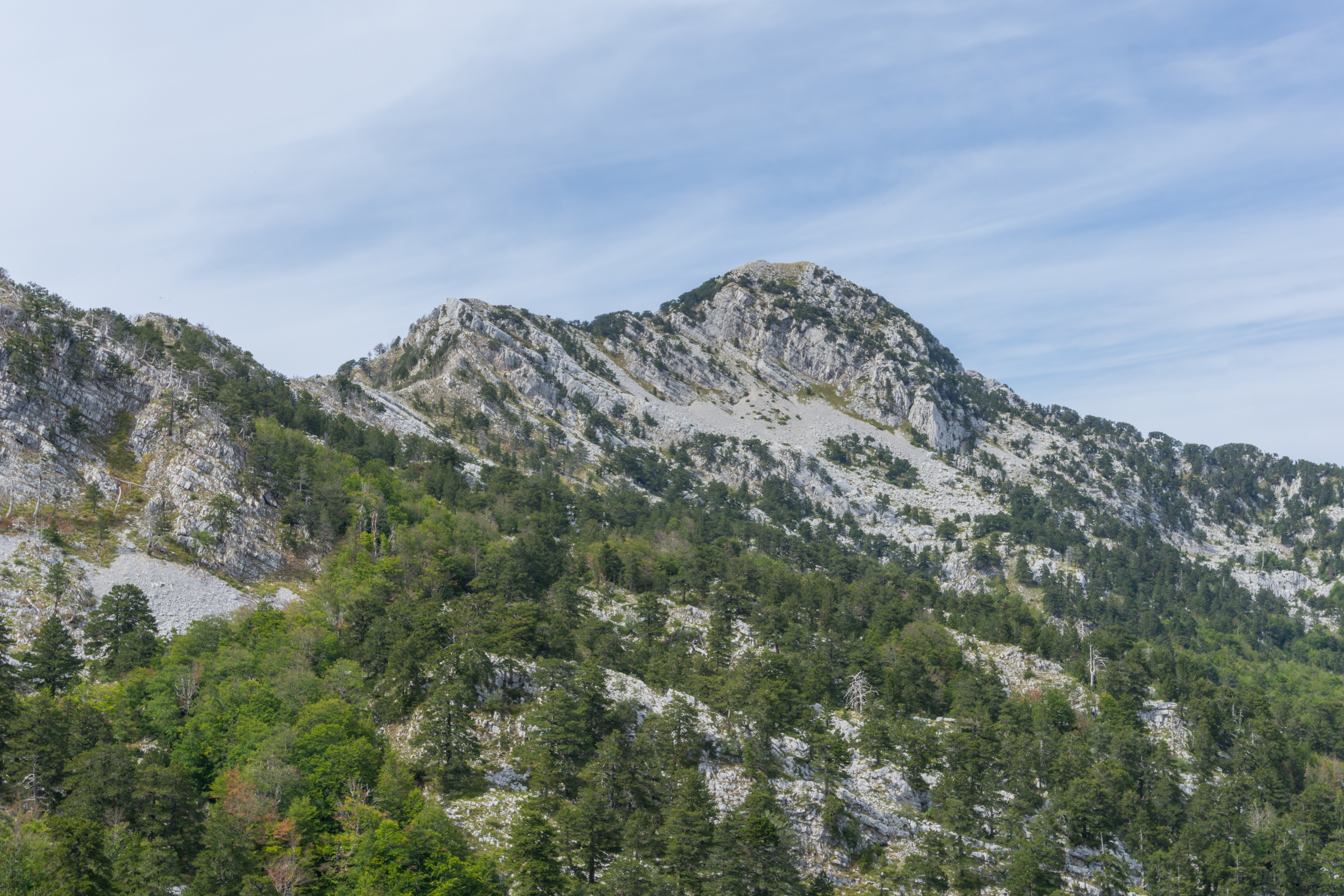
Peak and its surrounding evergreen forest
