= Dinaric calcareous block fir forest =

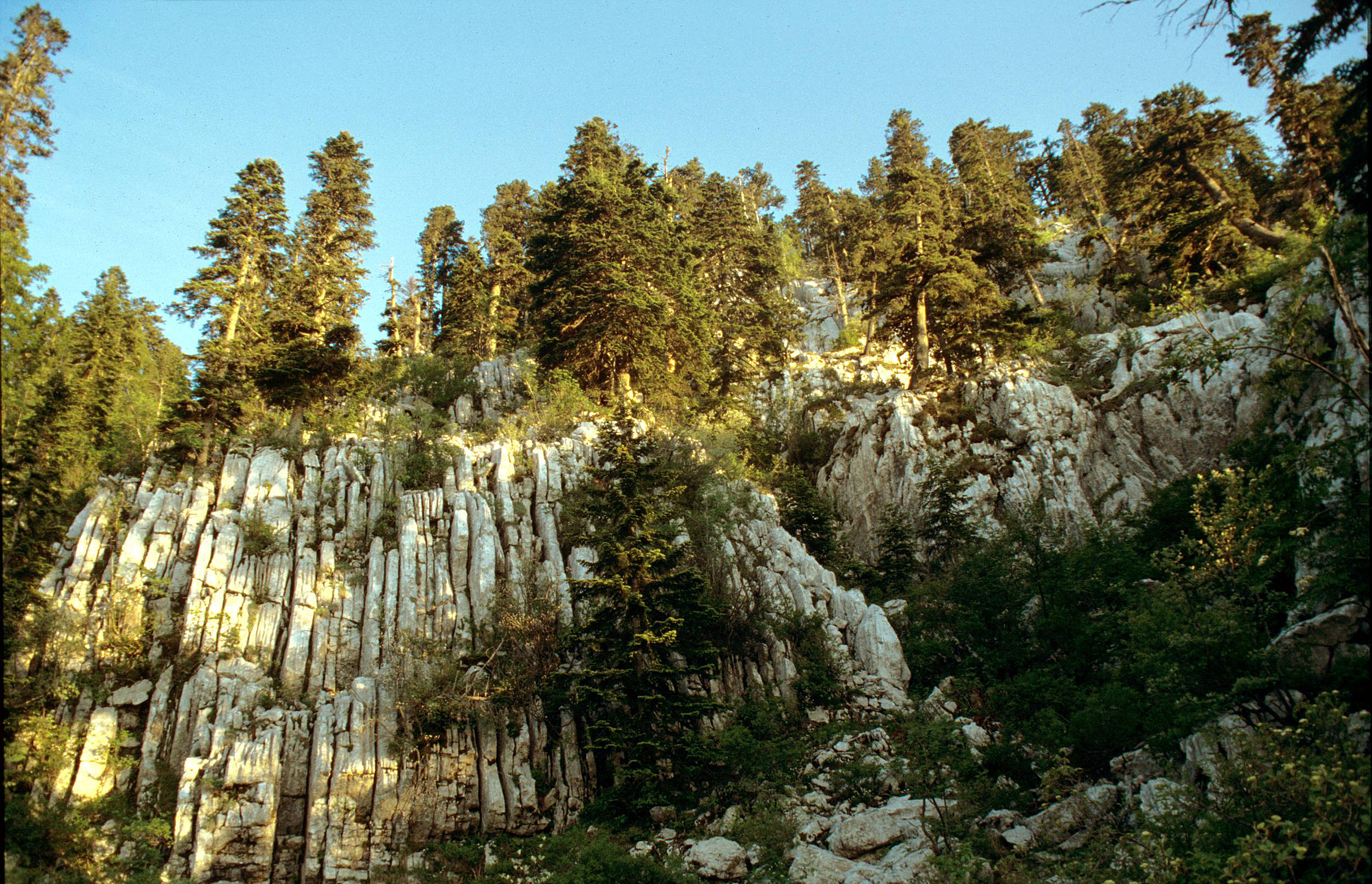
Pure silver fir forests are endemic to the Dinaric alps and especially to Orjen

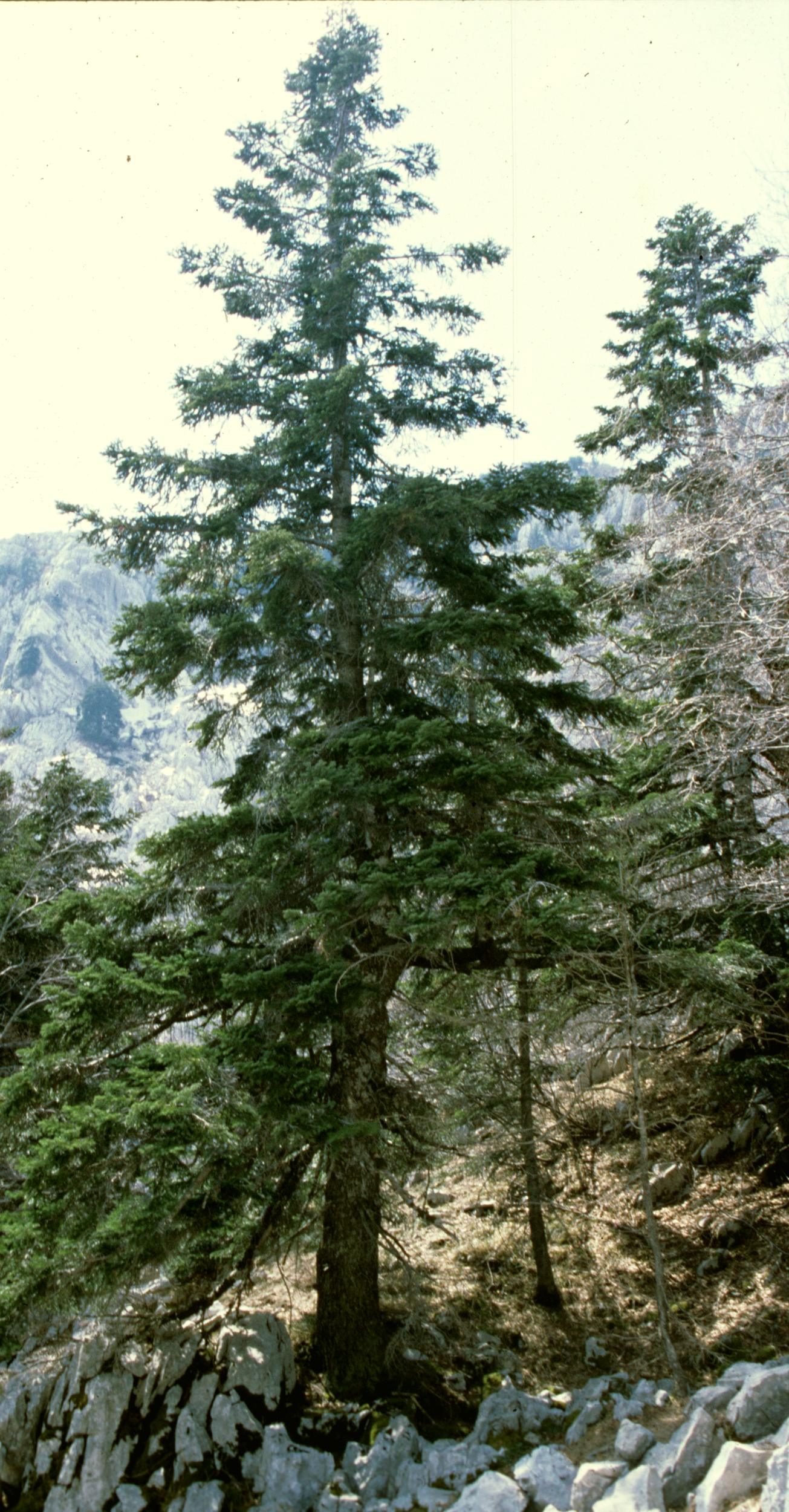
Silver fir on Orjen on bare limestone

Mixed deciduous and silver fir forest with Peonies at Orjen

The dinaric calcareous silver fir forests are an endemic vegetation type of the littoral Dinaric Alps, located in the Dinaric Mountains mixed forests ecoregion in Southeastern Europe. Pure stands of dinaric calcareous silver fir (Abies alba) forests appear on limestone escarpments in the montane zones of Orjen, Velebit, Biokovo and Prenj. As an endemic and rare vegetation type of the Dinarides, they need protection.

== Structure ==
Dinaric calcareous silver fir forests have an open structure which is environmentally sensible. As storms of bora and scirocco type are common in the coastal dinaric mountains, wind plays a great role in the formation of the highly labile structure in the pure silver fir communities. Silver firs can reach up to 35 metres (115 ft) on limestone and trunk diameters of 1 metre (3.3 ft) have been observed.

== Distribution ==
Dinaric calcareous silver fir forests are dispersed in smaller patches on the hyperkarstic littoral karst mountain environments of the Dinarides. Prominent are those on Velebit and Orjen, appearing on bare limestone escarpments in the montane lifezone between 1,200–1,550 metres (3,940–5,090 ft). The abundance of precipitation on these coastal mountains of up to 5000 mm/m^{2}a with the dry soil conditions restricts these pure silver fir forests to the most rainy and humid spots of the Dinarides.

== Ecology ==
Silver fir is a constituent of montane central European forests. As a rare species in dry climates of the Mediterranean, the silver firs presence on Mt. Orjen are restricted to humid northern slopes. A marked difference in the fir's vegetation patterns is seen here. It has a common cause in soil formation. High soil-water content in terrae fuscae on glacial superstratum leads to beech-fir forests, whereas dry initial rendzinas on glacio-karstic substrate support xeric dinaric calcareous silver fir forests. The latter endemic community rich in submediterranean species has evolutionary parallels with Bosnian Pine communities.

== Floristic composition ==
Dinaric calcareous silver fir forests are among the most species-rich montane ecosystems in the Dinaric Alps.

Mixed deciduous-silver fir peony (Paeonia daurica Andrews)-forests with Paeonia daurica' have the most species rich composition found so far on Orjen (Abies alba, Corylus colurna, Fraxinus excelsior, Fagus sylvatica, Acer intermedium, Tilia cordata, Acer pseudoplatanus, Pinus heldreichii).

Mixed deciduous-silver fir-peony forest at Orjen
Art	Plot 1	Plot 2
Paeonia daurica - Peony	4	3
Abies alba - Silver fir	4	3
Fagus sylvatica - Beech	4	5
Corylus colurna	3	0
Ostrya carpinifolia	0	4
Acer pseudoplatanus - Sycamore maple	3	3
Acer intermedium	0	2
Fraxinus excelsior - Ash	3	2
Sorbus aria	2	0
Euonymus europaea	0	2
Crataegus montanus	2	0
Prunus prostrata	0	2
Lonicera glutinosa	3	0
Rosa pendulina	0	2
Sesleria autumnalis	5	4
Aremonia agremonoides	2	2
Heracleum sphondylium	3	0
Asphodelus albus	2	2
Lilium martagon ssp. cattaniae - Lily	2	2
Iris orjenii	0	2
Bryonia dioica	2	2
Dentaria enneaphyllos	2	0
Hedera helix - Ivy	3	0
Tamus communis	3	0
Sedum maximum	2	2
Dryopteris filix-mas	2	0
Hieracium murrorum	0	2
Pteridium aquilinum	2	0
Lamium spec.	0	2
Anemone nemoralis	2	0
Frangula rupestris	0	2
Viola riviniana	2	2
Prenanthes purpurea	2	0
Polygonatum odoratum	0	2
Dentaria bulbifera	2	2
Melica nutans	2	2
Thalcitrum minus	0	2
Crocus dalmaticus	0	2
Cirsium erisithales	2	0
Sesleria robusta	3	0
Sedum ochroleucum	2	2
Rubus idaeus	2	0
Cicerbita alpina	2	0
Rosa spec.	0	2
Vicia cracca	0	2
Convallaria majalis	2	0
Festuca ovina	0	3
Fragaria vesca	2	0
Myrrhis odorata	5	0
Asyneuma pichlerii	2	0
Geranium robertianum	2	0
Galium lucidum	0	5
Thalictrum aquilegiifolium	0	2

* Syntaxonomic chart of mixed deciduous-silver fir-peony forest at Orjen

=== Plant list ===
Typical plants of the many times dry basic Kalkomelasol soil plant Biotope:
C. OREOHERZOGIO-ABIETALIA Fuk. 1969
a) Oreoherzogio-Abietion Ht. emend. Fuk.
1. Oreoherzogio-Abietetum Fuk.

· 1. Trees

Abies alba
Pinus heldreichii
Fagus sylvatica
Corylus colurna
Ostrya carpinifolia
Pinus nigra
Fraxinus excelsior
· 2. Shrubs
Berberis illyrica
Lonicera glutinosa
Viburnum maculatum
Rhamnus fallax
Sorbus aria
Euonymus europaeus
Rosa pendulina
Juniperus nana
Sambucus nigra
Cotoneaster integerrimus
Daphne mezereum
Lonicera xylosteum
Frangula rupestris
· 3. Ground level
Calamagrostis varia
Lilium martagon subsp. cattaniae
Fritillaria gracilis
Cirsium erisithales
Valeriana montana
Scrophularia nodosa
Scrophularia bosniaca
Polygonatum viviparum
Cystopteris fragilis
Arabis turrita
Actaea spicata
Astrantia major
Viola riviniana
Vicia cracca
Arabis hirsuta
Cardamine glauca
Urtica dioica
Paeonia daurica
Muscari botryoides
Satureja montana
Seseli globuliferum
Iberis sempervirens
Myosotis sylvestris
Taraxacum officinalis
Aposeris foetida
Hypericum alpinum
Doronicum columnae

Epilobium montanum
Ononis natrix
Melica nutans
Corydalis ochroleuca
Ceterach officinarum
Sedum boloniense
Cicerbita alpina
Erysimum humile
Stellaria graminea
Verbascum spec.
Lotus alpinus
Saxifraga marginata
Symphytum tuberosum
Asplenium trichomanes
Hieracium murorum
Convallaria majalis
Actaea spicata
Rubus idaeus
Thalictrum aquilegiifolium
Thalictrum minima
Potentilla speciosa
Potentilla argentea
Myrrhis odorata
Scilla litardieri
Sesleria robusta
Peucedanum longifolium
Gentiana lutea
Lamium spec.
Agrimonia agrimonoides
Polystichum lonchitis
Achillea spec.
Origanum vulgare
Lotus corniculatus
Heracleum sphondylium
Gentiana verna
Luzula luzuloides
Silene spec.
Sedum maximum
Aquilegia dinarica
Moltkia petraea
Asphodelus albus
Asplenium ruta-muraria
Asplenium adiantum-nigrum
Amphoricarpos neumayerii
Ornithogalum umbellatum
Epilobium angustifolium
Biscutella cichorifolia

(around 50 Samples in Orjen)
