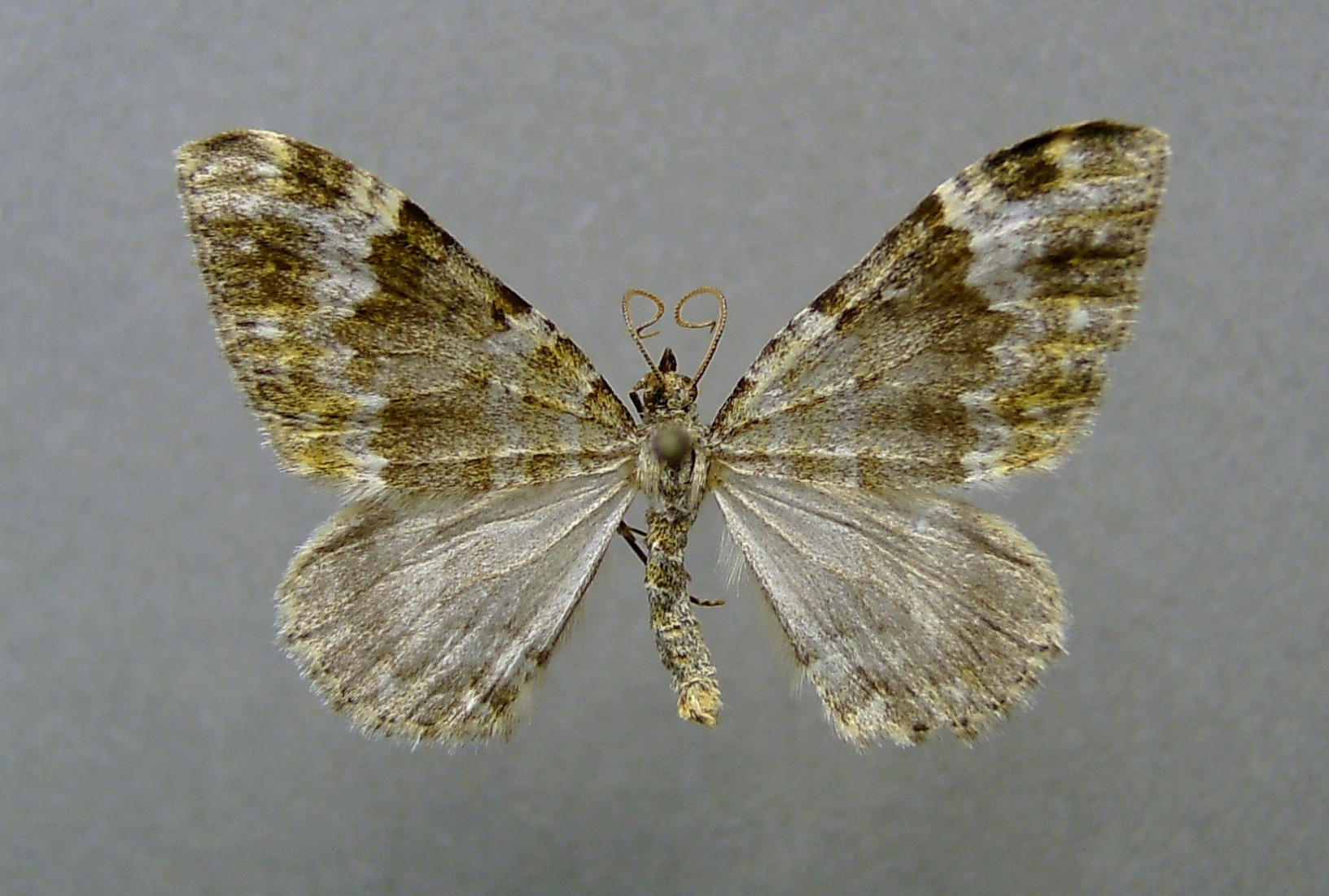

Scientific classification
- Domain: Eukaryota
- Kingdom: Animalia
- Phylum: Arthropoda
- Class: Insecta
- Order: Lepidoptera
- Family: Geometridae
- Genus: Coenotephria
- Species: C. tophaceata

Binomial name
- Coenotephria tophaceata (Denis & Schiffermüller, 1775)

Synonyms
- Geometra tophaceata Denis & Schiffermüller, 1775; Larentia jurassica Vorbrodt & Muller-Rutz, 1914

= Coenotephria tophaceata =

Species of moth

Coenotephria tophaceata is a species of moth of the family Geometridae. It is found in mountains of central and southern Europe.

The wingspan is 32–36 mm. There are two generations per year with adults on wing from May to July and again from August to September.

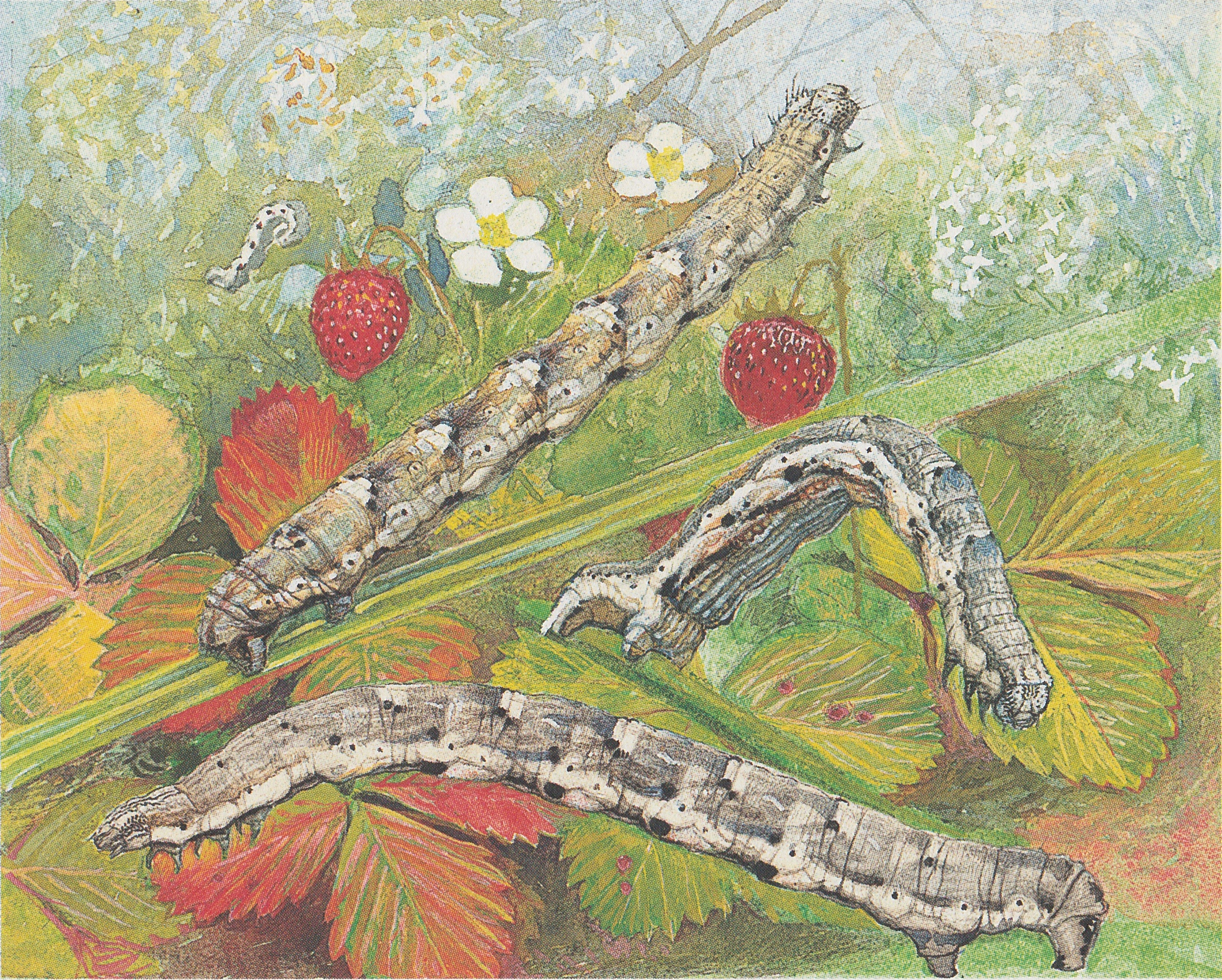
Caterpillars

The larvae feed on Galium species, including Galium album, Galium sylvaticum, Galium lucidum and Galium verum. There are also records for Asperula species.

== Subspecies ==
- Coenotephria tophaceata tophaceata
- Coenotephria tophaceata jurassica Vorbrodt & Muller-Rutz, 1914
