= Sow thistle =

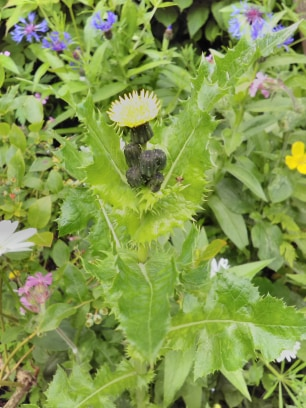
Sow thistle

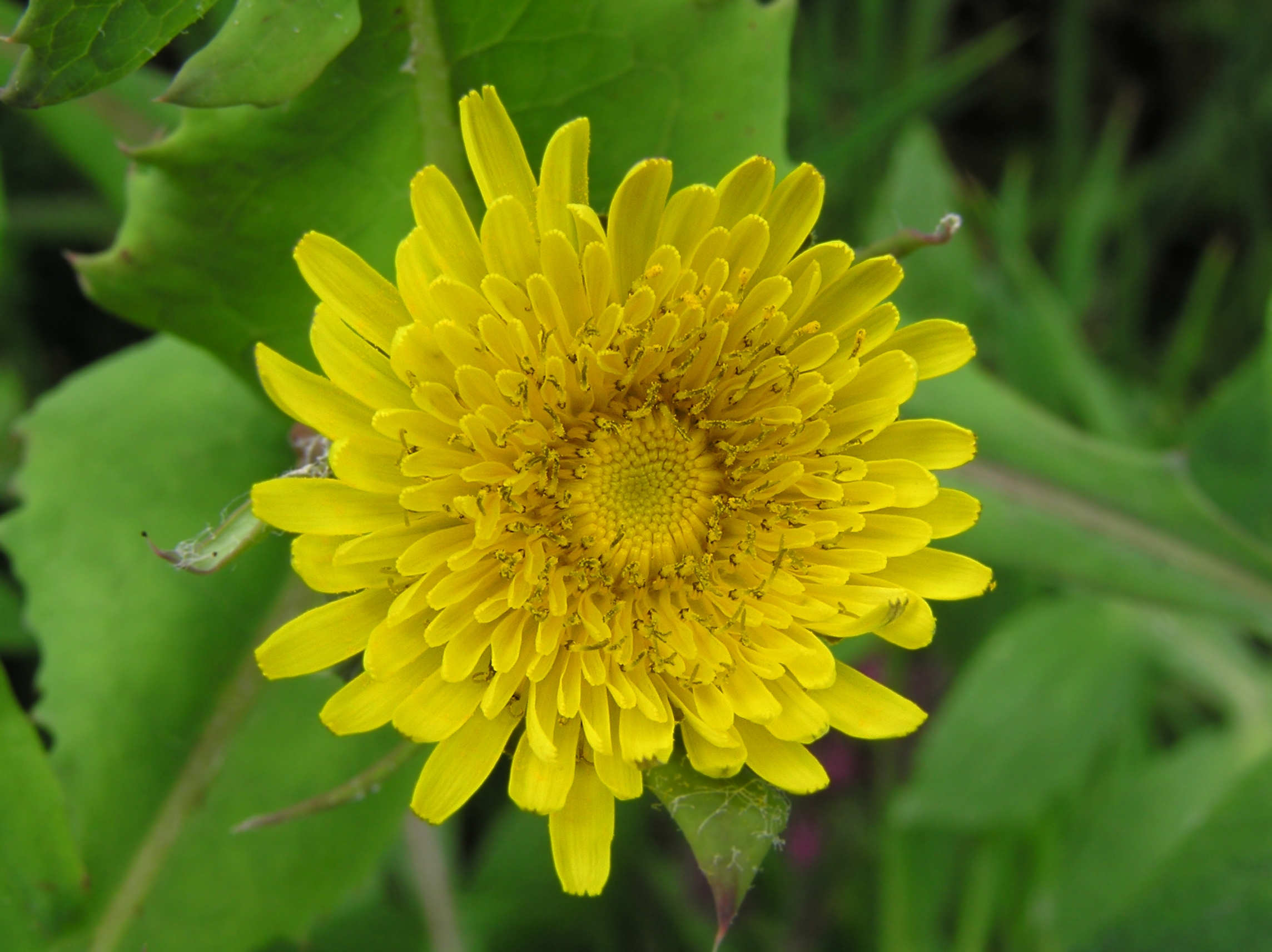
Sonchus flower, Wellington, New Zealand

Sow thistle most often refers to yellow flowered, thistle-like plants in the genus Sonchus.

Sow thistle may also refer to:

- Cicerbita, a genus of plants related to Sonchus, with blue, white, or yellow flowers.

== See also ==
- Reichardia tingitana, false sow thistle
- Sonchus asper, the prickly sow-thistle
- Sonchus oleraceus, common sowthistle
