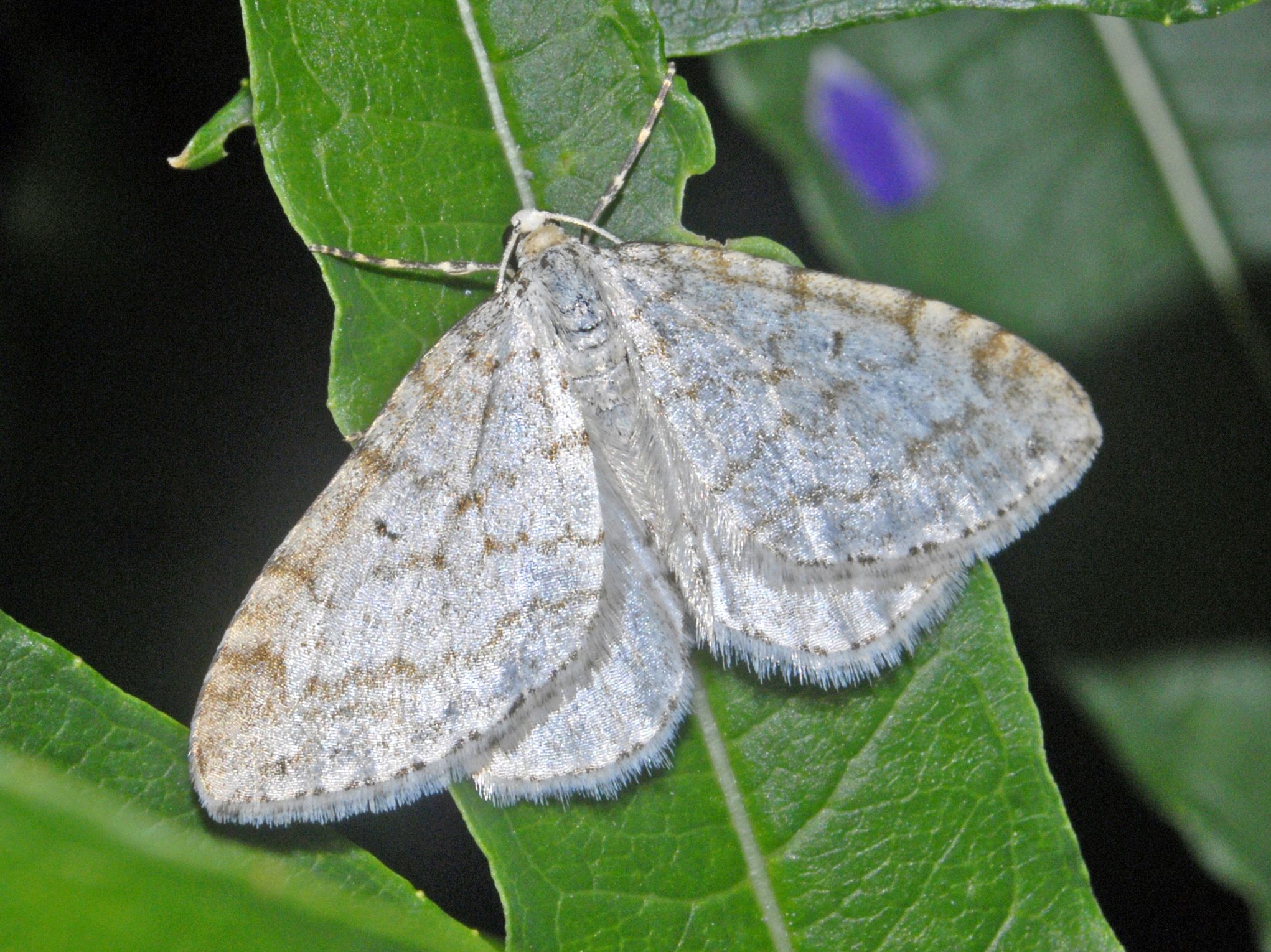
- Mesotype verberata. Dorsal view
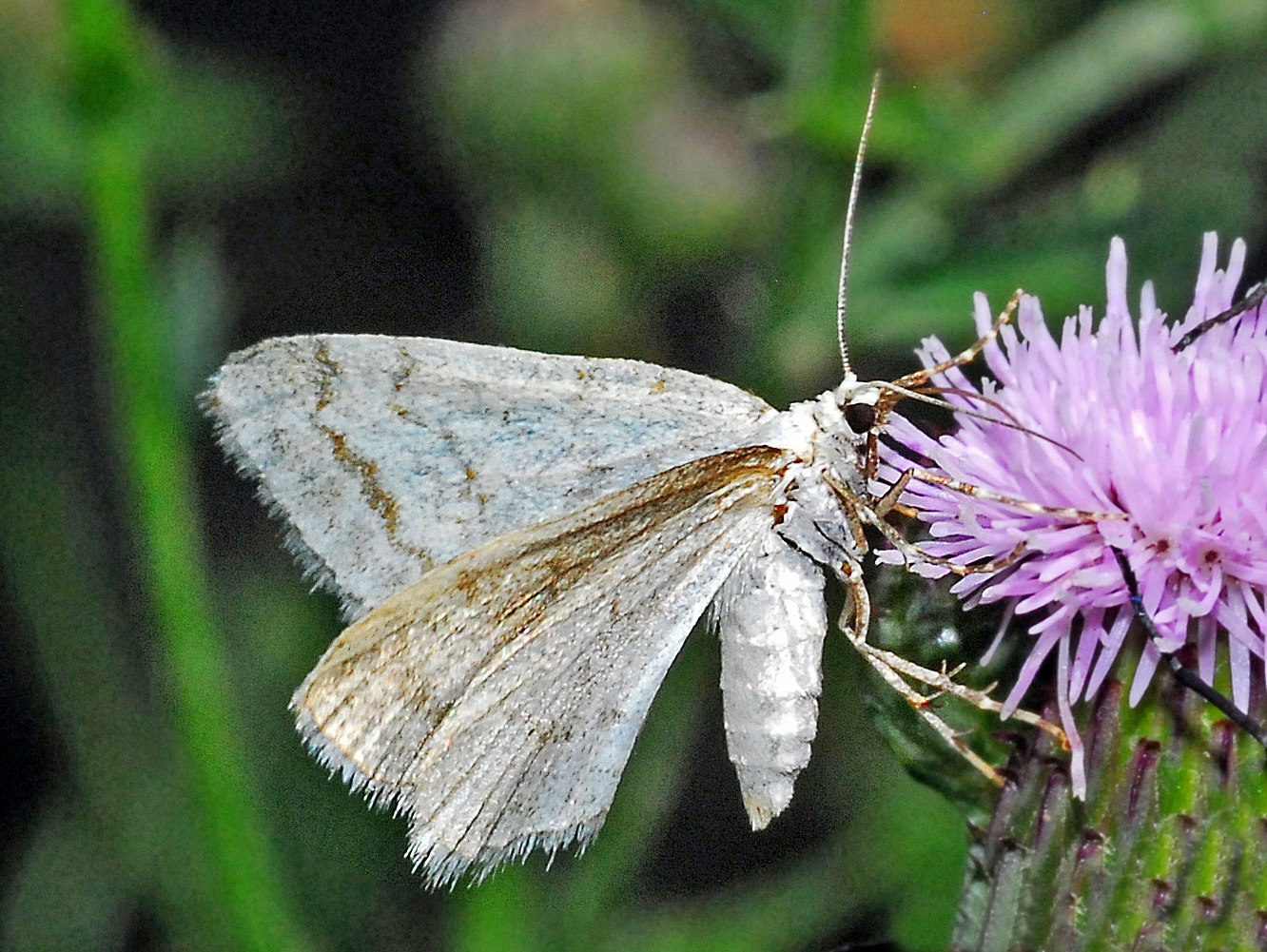
- Side view

Scientific classification
- Domain: Eukaryota
- Kingdom: Animalia
- Phylum: Arthropoda
- Class: Insecta
- Order: Lepidoptera
- Family: Geometridae
- Genus: Mesotype
- Species: M. verberata

Binomial name
- Mesotype verberata (Scopoli, 1763)

Synonyms
- Phalaena verberata Scopoli, 1763; Perizoma verberata

= Mesotype verberata =

Species of moth

Mesotype verberata is a moth in the family Geometridae first described by Giovanni Antonio Scopoli in his 1763 Entomologia Carniolica.

== Description ==
The wingspan is 24–32 mm. Background color of the wings is whitish. Upperside of the forewings shows three to five, thin, gray-brown, wavy lines. The hindwings are whitish and show one or two indistinct transverse lines. At the base of all wings there are small black dots.

== Biology ==
Adults are on wing mainly in June, July and August. They feed on the nectar of a number of flowers, including those of Solidago virgaurea, Aconitum napellus and Campanula rotundifolia.

The larvae feed on various plants, including Meum athamanticum and Prenanthes purpurea. They can be found from April to June. The species overwinters as an egg.

== Distribution ==
This species can be found mainly in the mountainous regions of Central Europe, from Spain through the Alps and the Balkan Peninsula to Western Asia.
