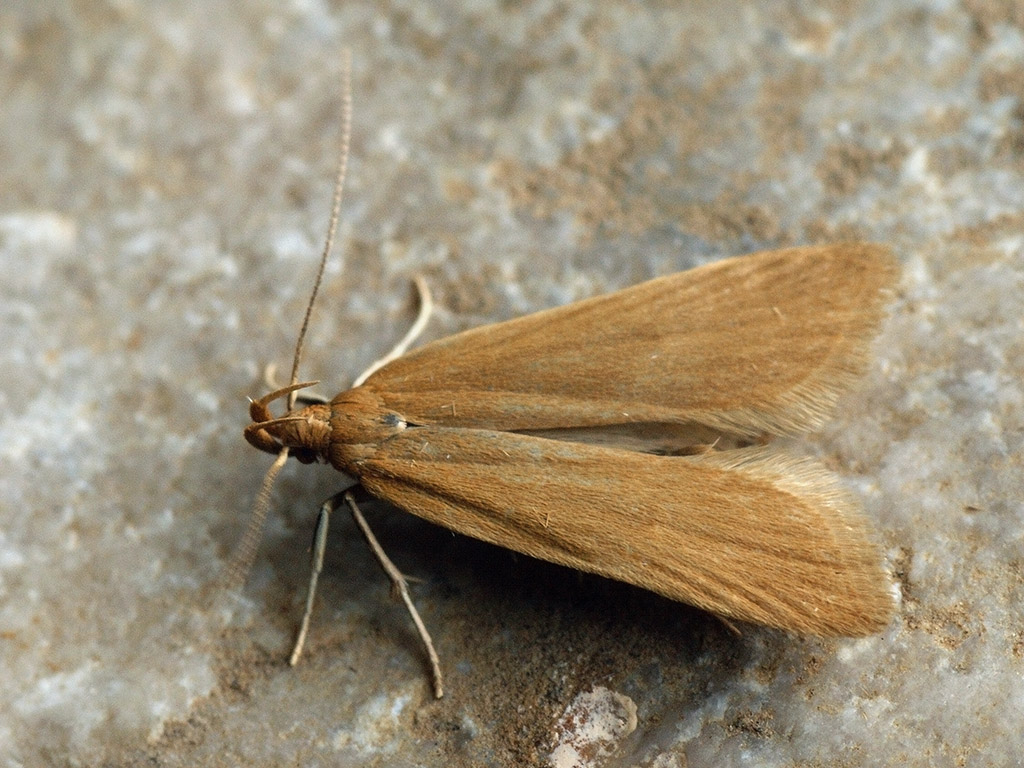

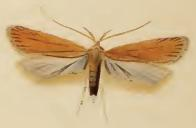

Scientific classification
- Kingdom: Animalia
- Phylum: Arthropoda
- Clade: Pancrustacea
- Class: Insecta
- Order: Lepidoptera
- Family: Gelechiidae
- Genus: Helcystogramma
- Species: H. rufescens

Binomial name
- Helcystogramma rufescens (Haworth, 1828)

Synonyms
- Recurvaria rufescens Haworth, 1828; Brachmia terrella Fischer von Röslerstamm, 1843; Gelechia diaphanella Zeller, 1846; Gelechia isabella Zeller, 1850

= Helcystogramma rufescens =

Species of moth

Helcystogramma rufescens is a moth of the family Gelechiidae. It is found in most of Europe.

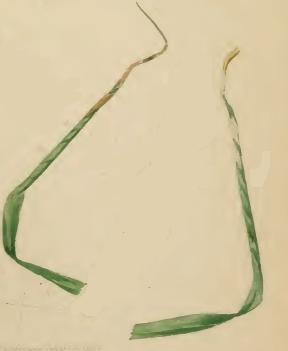
Grass leaf blades rolled up and discoloured by larva

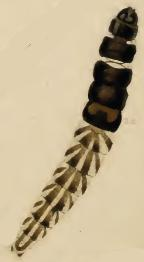
Larva

The wingspan is 14–17 mm. Forewings with termen straight; light reddish-ochreous, sometimes darker between veins posteriorly; second, discal stigma sometimes fuscous. Hindwings are whitish-grey, tinged with reddish-ochreous. The larva is white; subdorsal line and lateral series of oblique marks dark grey; dots black; 3-6 black, 3 and 4 white-edged anteriorly, 6 with brown dorsal blotch; head and plate of 2 black .

Adults are on wing from June to August.

The larvae feed on various grasses, including Brachypodium sylvaticum, Arrhenatherum elatius, Poa trivialis, Dactylis glomerata, Phalaris arundinacea, Melica nutans, Calamagrostis arundinacea and Calamagrostis epigejos. Larvae can be found from April to July.
