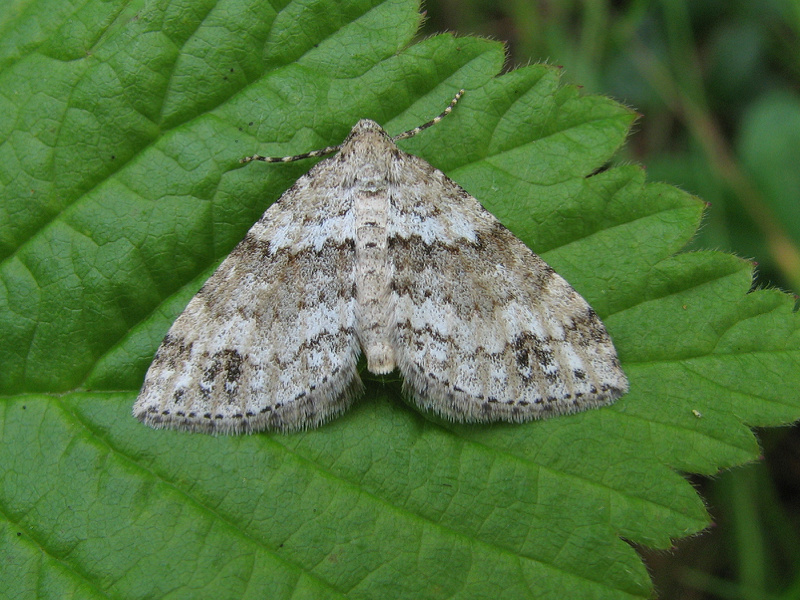

Scientific classification
- Kingdom: Animalia
- Phylum: Arthropoda
- Class: Insecta
- Order: Lepidoptera
- Family: Geometridae
- Genus: Mesotype
- Species: M. didymata

Binomial name
- Mesotype didymata (Linnaeus, 1758)

Synonyms
- Phalaena didymata Linnaeus, 1758; Perizoma didymata (Linnaeus, 1758)

= Mesotype didymata =

Species of moth

Mesotype didymata, the twin-spot carpet, is a moth of the family Geometridae. The species was first described by Carl Linnaeus in his 1758 10th edition of Systema Naturae. Its genus is sometimes included in Perizoma.

== Distribution ==
It is found in northern and central Europe; further south and east it seems to be confined to the mountains Pyrenees, Alps, Urals.

== Description ==
The wingspan is 24–29 mm. The ground colour of the forewings is generally pale or dark grey. There are two dark stains near the apex and the costa of the forewing. The wavy crosslines delimit a darker mid field and a darker marginal field.

It is very variable in colour, with the male considerably darker than the female; in some districts the sexual dimorphism is quite striking. This sex is also appreciably smaller and narrower-winged than the male and has a much stouter abdomen. - ab. ochroleucata Auriv. is unicolorous grey yellow or yellow brown without markings except the light subterminal line. - In ab. nigrofasciata Rbl. The ground colour is darkened and the median band narrow, almost black. - ab. nigra Prout has uniform blackish brown wings. In hethlandica Rbl. the male is more or less bright orange brown, the female lighter ochreous brown or fawn colour.

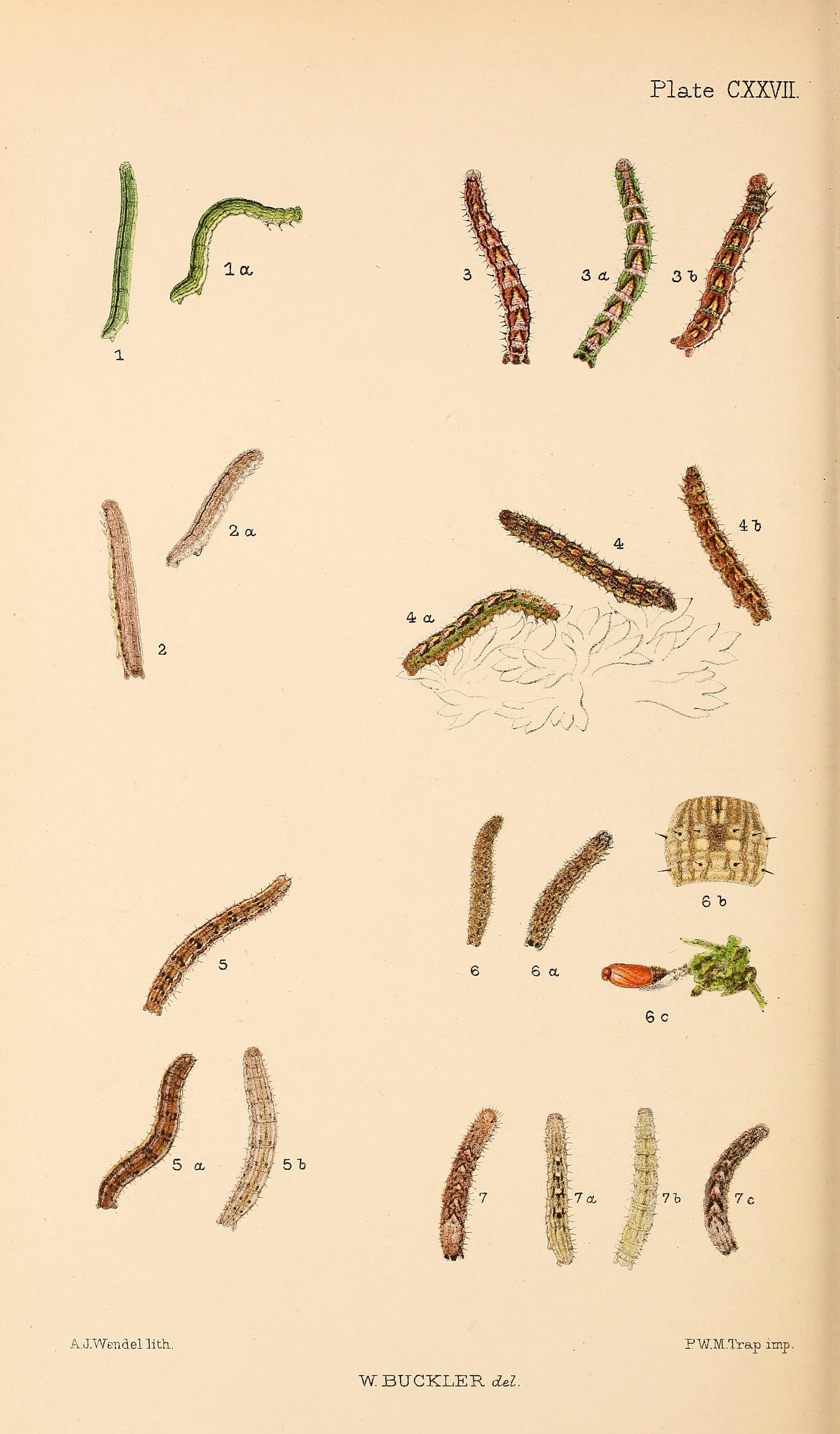
Figs.1,1a larvae after final moult

The larva is long and slender and differs so from most species of the genus Perizoma. It is grey-green in colour with short, dark brushes.

== Biology ==
Adults are on wing from June to August. There is one generation per year.

The larvae feed on various plants, including Vaccinium myrtillus, Salix and Calluna.Unlike most Perizoma the species lives openly on the nutrient plant, not inside the seed capsules, and it can use a variety of different nutrient plants. This may provide the basis for assigning this species (and some others) to the genus Mesotype.

== Subspecies ==
- Mesotype didymata didymata
- Mesotype didymata hethlandica (Shetland Isles)
