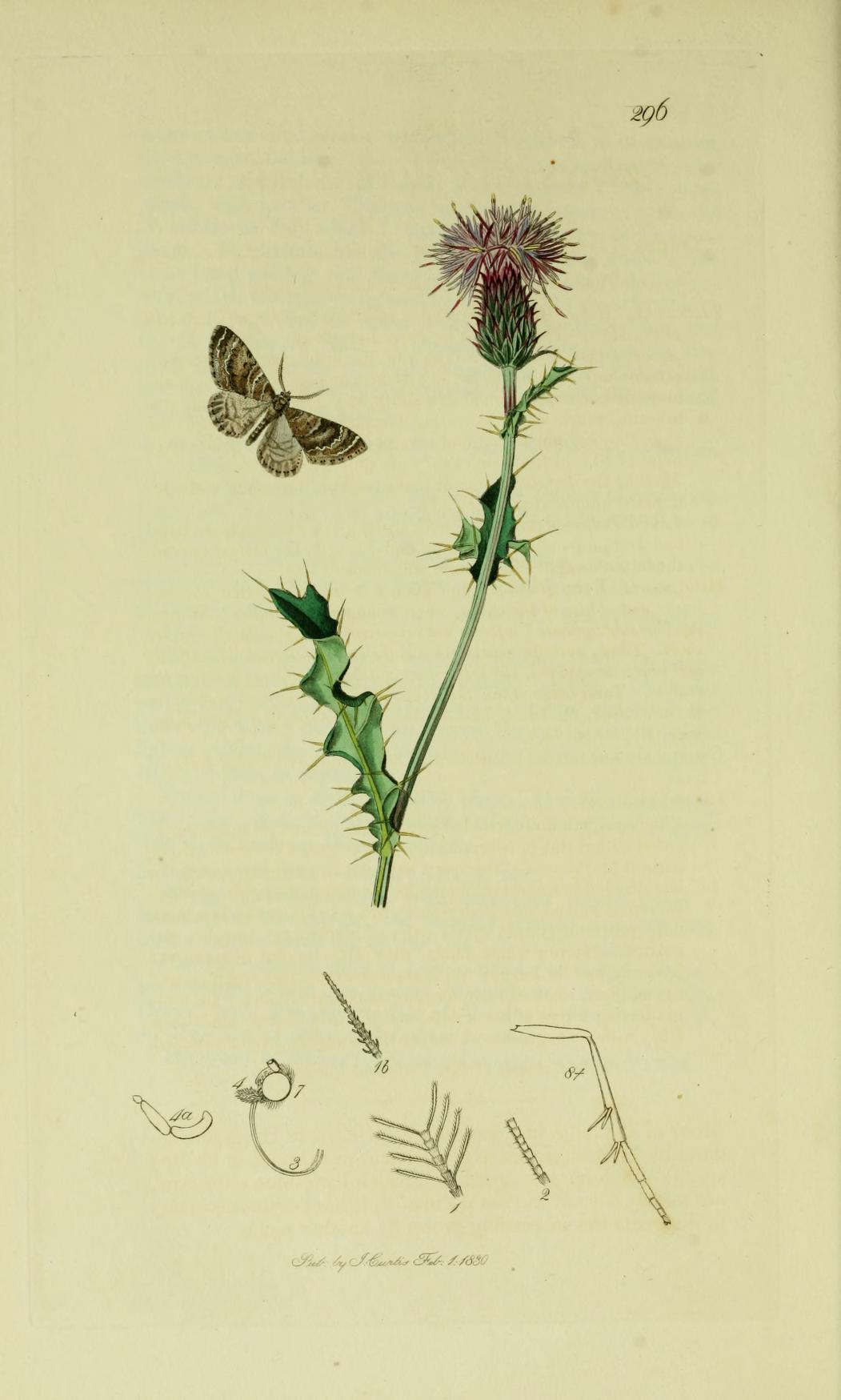
- Illustration from John Curtis's British Entomology Volume 6

Scientific classification
- Domain: Eukaryota
- Kingdom: Animalia
- Phylum: Arthropoda
- Class: Insecta
- Order: Lepidoptera
- Family: Geometridae
- Genus: Coenotephria
- Species: C. salicata

Binomial name
- Coenotephria salicata (Denis & Schiffermüller, 1775)

Synonyms
- Geometra salicata Denis & Schiffermuller, 1775; Nebula salicata (Denis & Schiffermüller, 1775); Zerynthia latentaria Curtis, 1830; Larentia probaria Herrich-Schaffer, 1856

= Coenotephria salicata =

Species of moth

Coenotephria salicata, the striped twin-spot carpet, is a moth of the family Geometridae. It was first described by Michael Denis and Ignaz Schiffermüller in 1775 and is found in most of Europe.

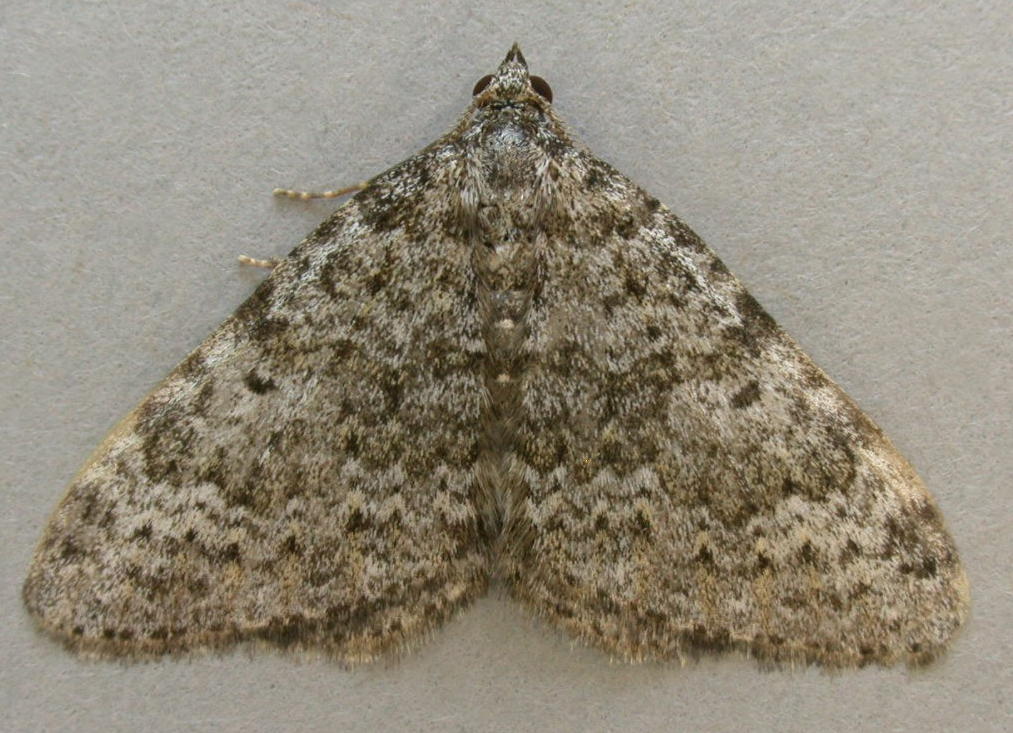
Coenotephra salicata Trawscoed, North Wales

The wingspan is 29–31 mm. Adults have a grey ground colour with darker cross lines which are difficult to distinguish if the forewings are heavily mottled. There are white broken lines along the outer margin of forewings. The larva is moderately stout, pale reddish brown, the dark dorsal line finely pale-edged, the subdorsal line fine and yellowish, the lateral stripe broadly yellow. The spiracles are black; tubercles small, black, the setae short.

Adults are on wing from May to July, and occasionally again in autumn in a partial second generation.

The larvae feed on the Galium species.

== Subspecies ==
- Coenotephria salicata latentaria (Curtis, 1830)
- Coenotephria salicata probaria (Herrich-Schaffer, 1856) Capri, the Balkans, Greece- a much paler, ash-grey form, sometimes quite whitish
- Coenotephria salicata salicata
