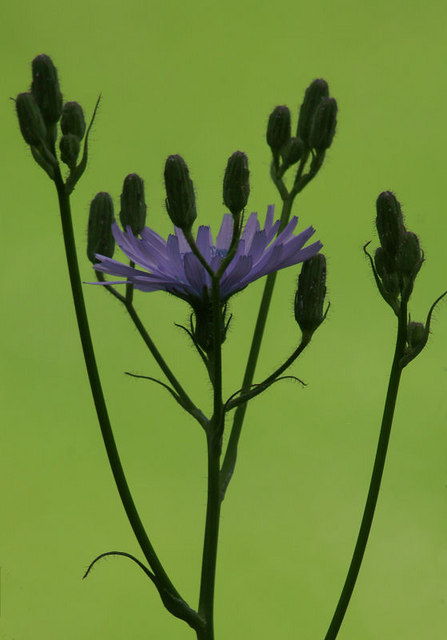

Scientific classification
- Kingdom: Plantae
- Clade: Tracheophytes
- Clade: Angiosperms
- Clade: Eudicots
- Clade: Asterids
- Order: Asterales
- Family: Asteraceae
- Genus: Cicerbita
- Species: C. macrophylla

Binomial name
- Cicerbita macrophylla (Willd.) Wallr.

Synonyms
- List: Agathyrsus macrophyllus (Willd.) Beck; Galathenium macrophyllum (Willd.) Nutt.; Hieracium cicerbita E.H.L.Krause; Lactuca macrophylla (Willd.) A.Gray; Mulgedium macrophyllum (Willd.) DC.; Sonchus macrophyllus Willd.

= Cicerbita macrophylla =

Species of lettuce

Cicerbita macrophylla (synonym Lactuca macrophylla), commonly known as common blue-sow-thistle, is a species of flowering plant in the family Asteraceae, native to central and east European Russia, Iran, North Caucasus, Transcaucasus and Turkey.

== Gallery ==
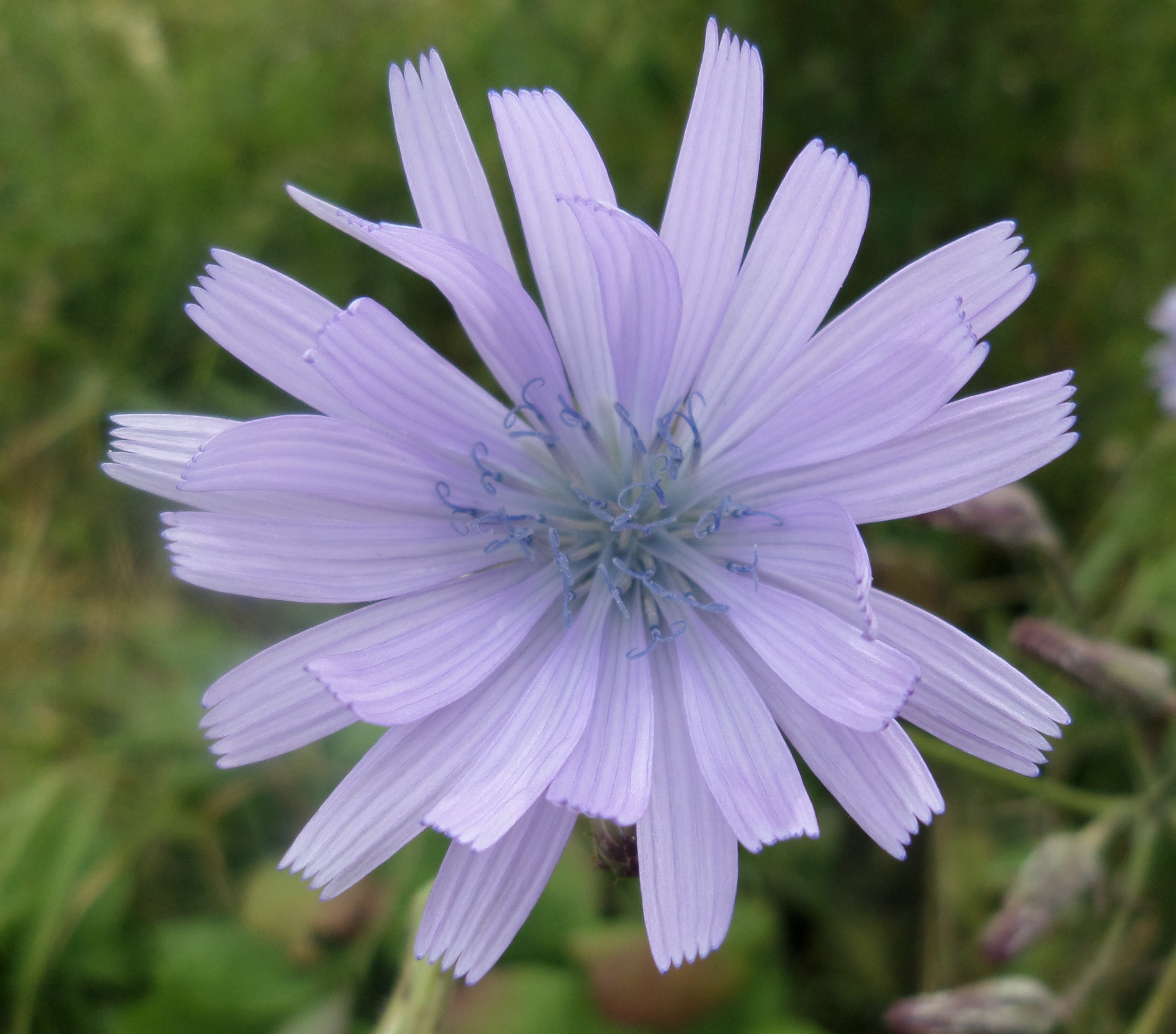
Flower

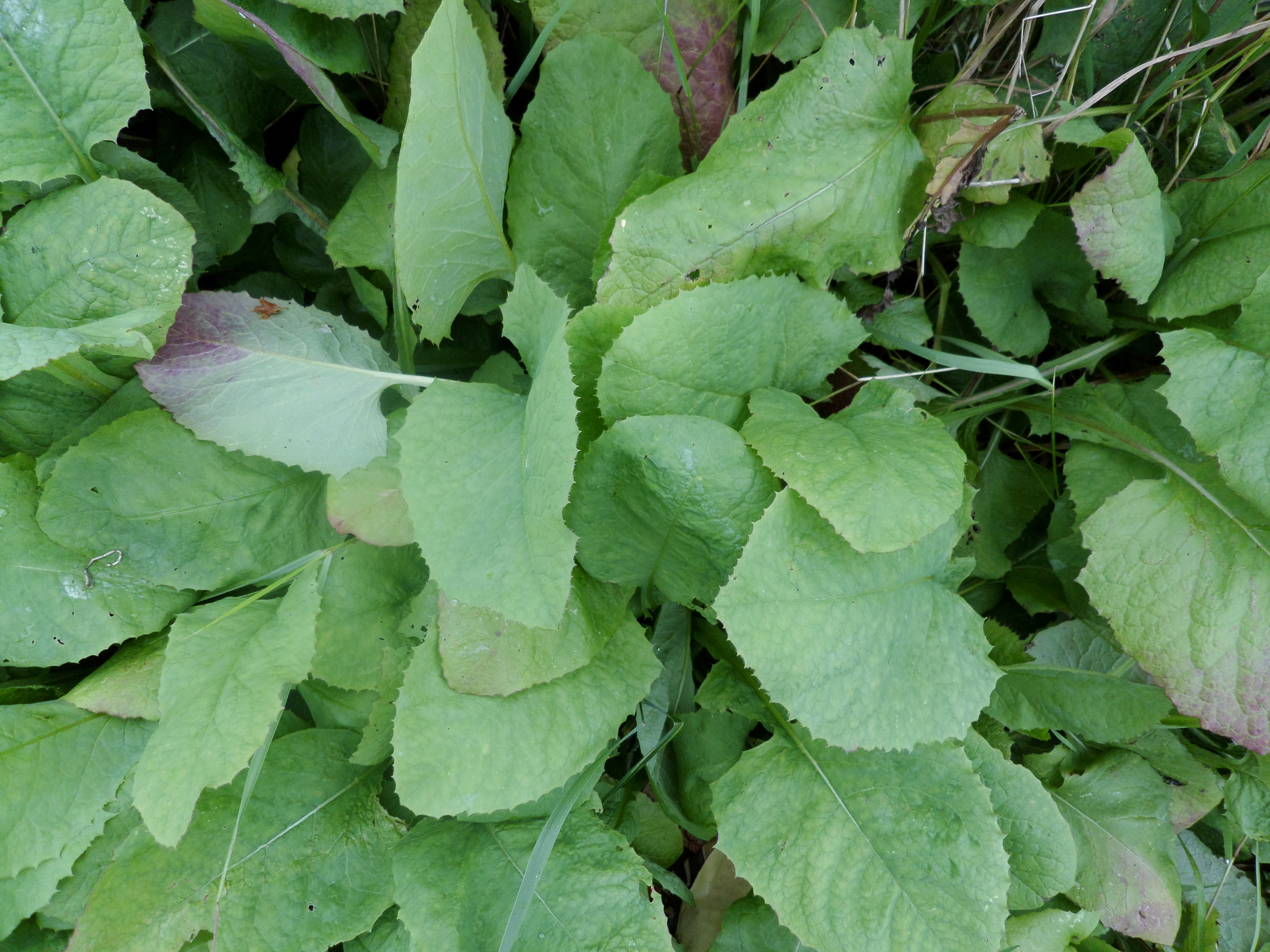
Foliage
