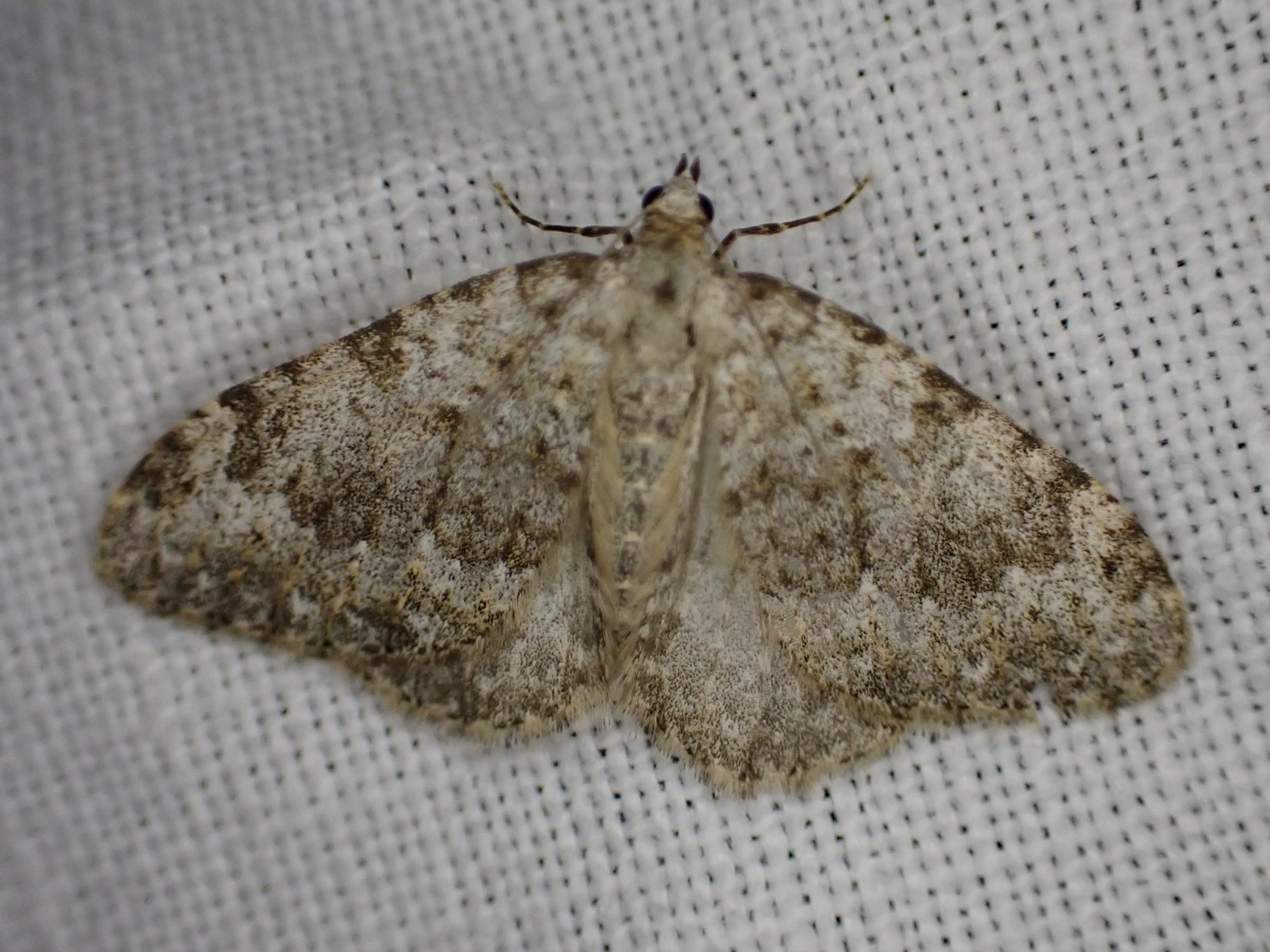

Scientific classification
- Domain: Eukaryota
- Kingdom: Animalia
- Phylum: Arthropoda
- Class: Insecta
- Order: Lepidoptera
- Family: Geometridae
- Genus: Coenotephria
- Species: C. ablutaria

Binomial name
- Coenotephria ablutaria (Boisduval, [1840])

Synonyms
- Eubolia ablutaria Boisduval, 1840; Nebula ablutaria; Coenotephria salicata ablutaria

= Coenotephria ablutaria =

Species of moth

Coenotephria ablutaria is a species of moth in the family Geometridae. It was described by Jean Baptiste Boisduval in 1840. It is found in Spain, France, Italy, Austria, Switzerland, Slovenia, Bulgaria, Romania, Serbia, Croatia, Albania, North Macedonia, Greece, Ukraine, as well as on Sardinia, Corsica, Sicily, Malta, Crete and Cyprus. Outside of Europe, it is found in Asia Minor and the Near East.

The wingspan is 19–27 mm.

The larvae probably feed on Galium species.
