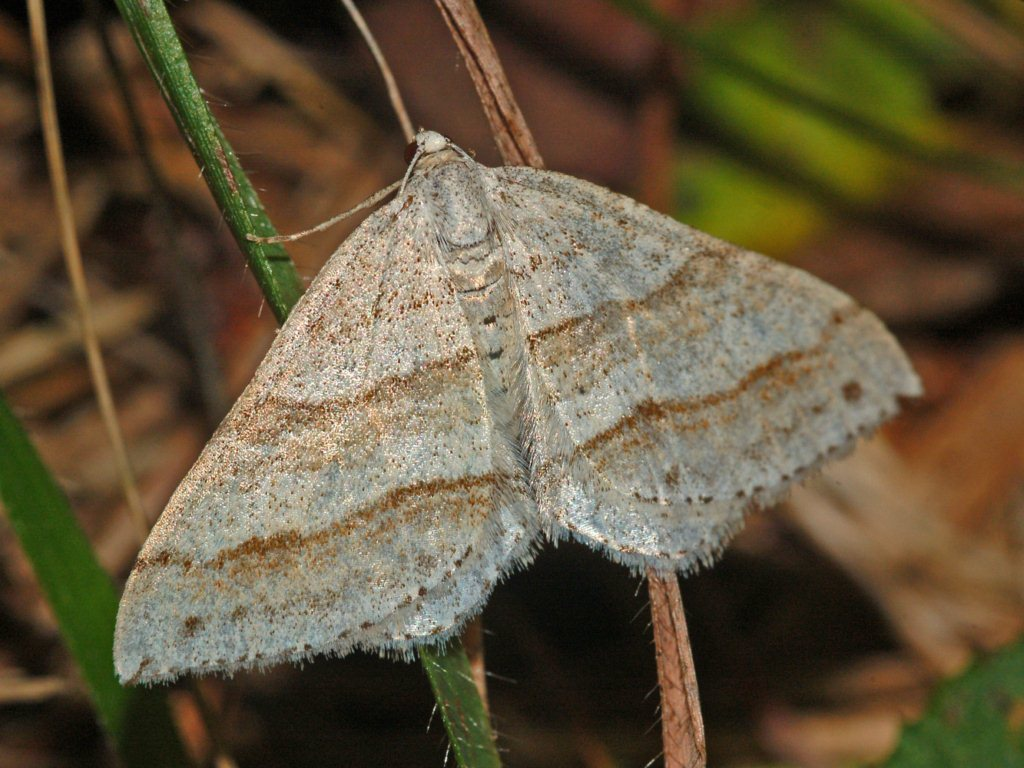

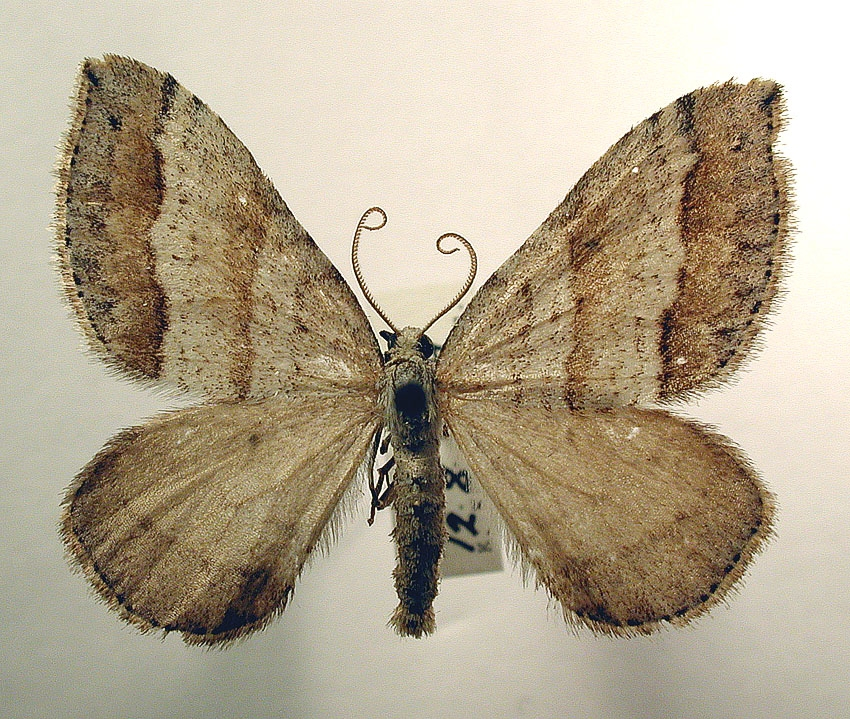

Scientific classification
- Kingdom: Animalia
- Phylum: Arthropoda
- Clade: Pancrustacea
- Class: Insecta
- Order: Lepidoptera
- Family: Geometridae
- Genus: Mesotype
- Species: M. parallelolineata

Binomial name
- Mesotype parallelolineata (Retzius, 1783)

Synonyms
- Perizoma parallelolineata (Retzius, 1783); Mesotype parallelolineatum (Retzius, 1783); Mesotype vespertaria (Denis & Schiffermüller, 1775)

= Mesotype parallelolineata =

Species of moth

Mesotype parallelolineata is a moth of the family Geometridae, subfamily Larentiinae. The species was first described by Anders Jahan Retzius in 1783. It is found in most of Europe, from central Europe through Russia to the Ural and Altai Mountains. Its genus Mesotype is sometimes included in Perizoma.

The wingspan is about 25 mm. Adults are on wing in August and September.

The larvae feed on various plants, including Galium, Rumex, Plantago and Taraxacum species.
