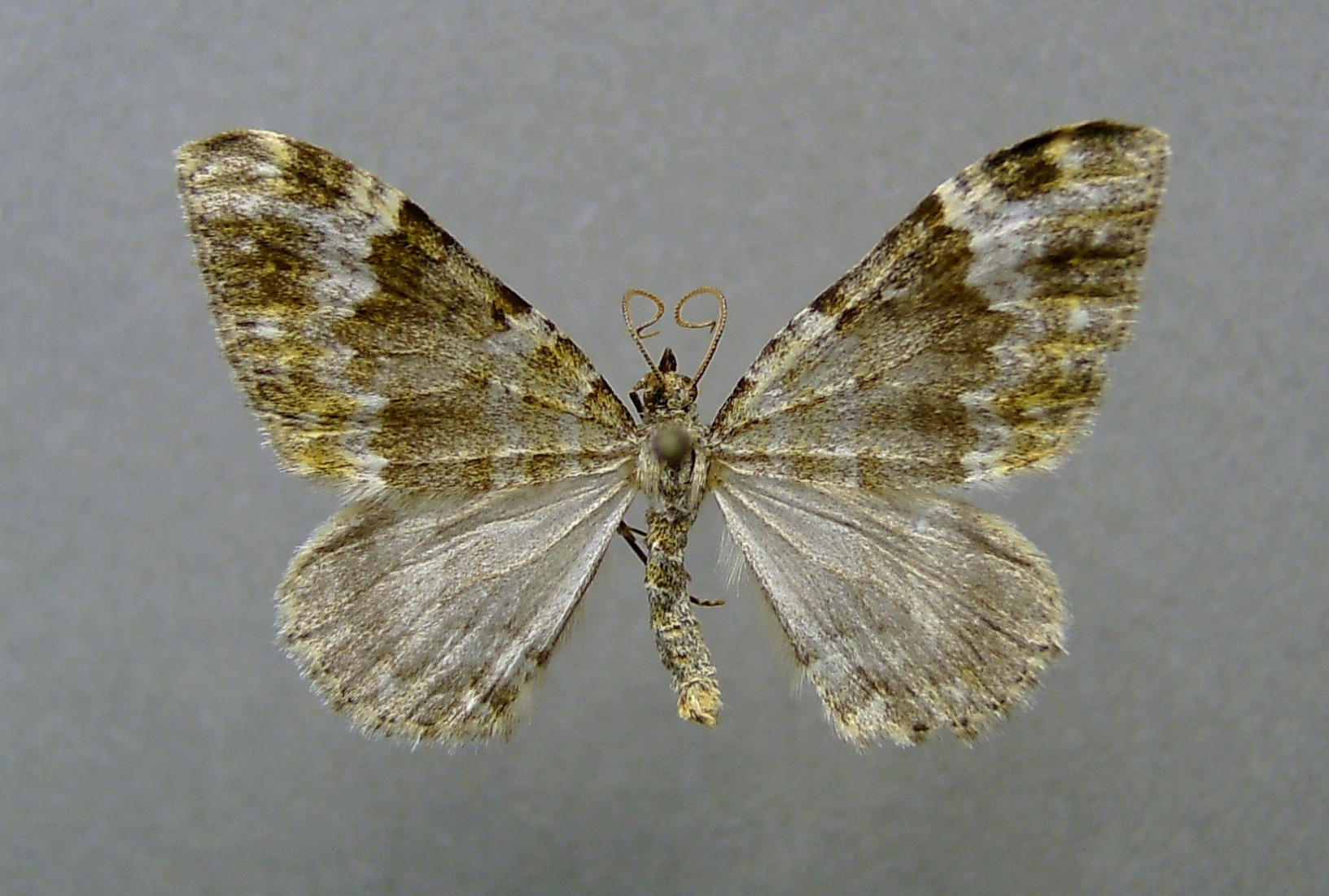
- Coenotephria tophaceata

Scientific classification
- Kingdom: Animalia
- Phylum: Arthropoda
- Clade: Pancrustacea
- Class: Insecta
- Order: Lepidoptera
- Family: Geometridae
- Subfamily: Larentiinae
- Genus: Coenotephria; Prout, 1914

Synonyms
- Phaesyle

= Coenotephria =

Genus of moths

Coenotephria is a genus of moths in the family Geometridae (Geometer moths) described by Prout in 1914. Its species are primarily found in Europe and Asia.

== Selected species ==
- Coenotephria ablutaria (Boisduval, 1840)
- Coenotephria achromaria (De la Harpe, 1853)
- Coenotephria adela (Butler, 1893)
- Coenotephria albicoma (Inoue, 1954)
- Coenotephria aleucidia (Butler, 1882)
- Coenotephria ambustaria (Leech, 1897)
- Coenotephria anomala (Inoue, 1954)
- Coenotephria apotoma (Turner, 1907)
- Coenotephria approximata (Staudinger, 1892)
- Coenotephria assimilata (Walker, 1862)
- Coenotephria avilaria (Reisser, 1936)
- Coenotephria bellissima (Butler, 1893)
- Coenotephria brevifasciata (Warren, 1888) (from India)
- Coenotephria caesaria (Constant, 1893)
- Coenotephria ceres (Butler, 1882)
- Coenotephria championi (Prout, 1926) (from India)
- Coenotephria corticalis (Butler, 1882)
- Coenotephria cylon (Druce, 1893)
- Coenotephria cynthia (Butler, 1882)
- Coenotephria decipiens (Butler, 1882)
- Coenotephria detritata (Staudinger, 1898
- Coenotephria diana (Butler, 1882)
- Coenotephria dubia (Butler, 1882)
- Coenotephria flavistrigata (Warren, 1888) (from India)
- Coenotephria homophana (Hampson, 1895) (from India)
- Coenotephria homophoeta Prout, 1926 (from India)
- Coenotephria salicata (Denis & Schiffermuller, 1775) - striped twin-spot carpet
- Coenotephria tophaceata (Denis & Schiffermuller, 1775)
