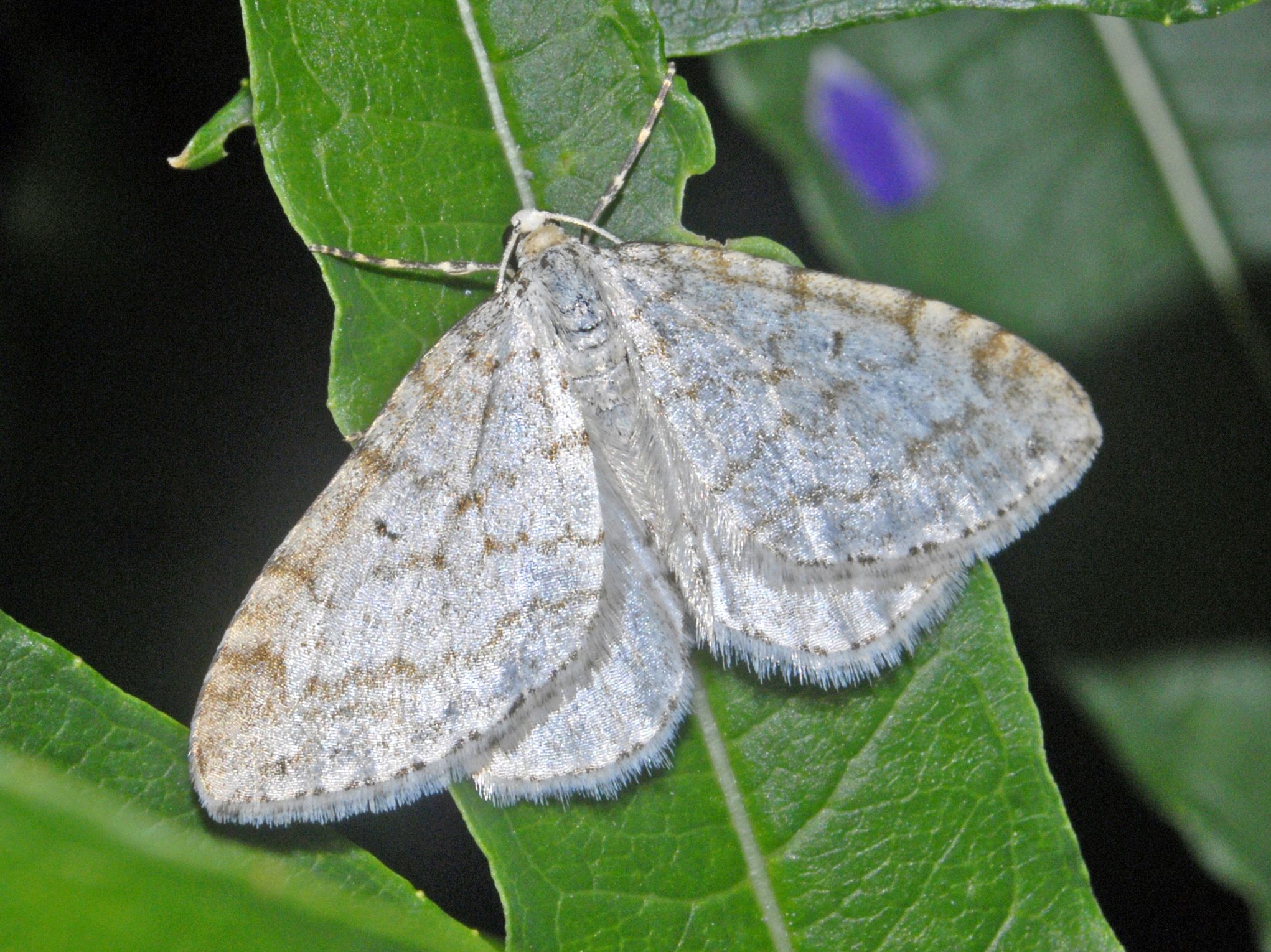
- Mesotype verberata

Scientific classification
- Kingdom: Animalia
- Phylum: Arthropoda
- Clade: Pancrustacea
- Class: Insecta
- Order: Lepidoptera
- Family: Geometridae
- Subfamily: Larentiinae
- Tribe: Perizomini
- Genus: Mesotype; Hübner, 1825

= Mesotype =

Genus of moths

Mesotype is a genus of moths in the family Geometridae erected by Jacob Hübner in 1825. It is sometimes included in Perizoma.

== Selected species ==
- Mesotype didymata (Linnaeus, 1758) – twin-spot carpet
- Mesotype parallelolineata (Retzius, 1783)
- Mesotype verberata (Scopoli, 1763)
