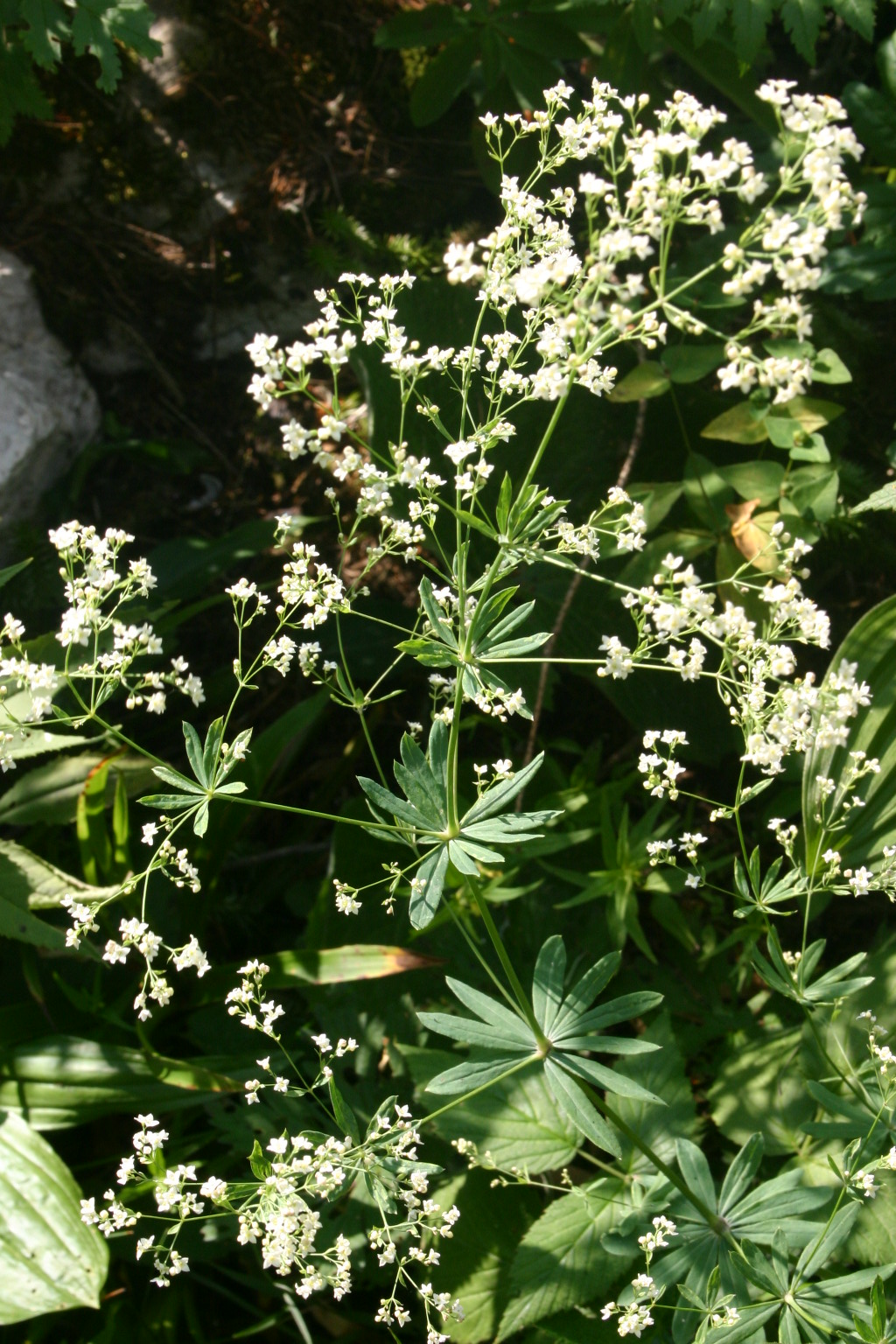

Scientific classification
- Kingdom: Plantae
- Clade: Embryophytes
- Clade: Tracheophytes
- Clade: Angiosperms
- Clade: Eudicots
- Clade: Asterids
- Order: Gentianales
- Family: Rubiaceae
- Genus: Galium
- Species: G. sylvaticum

Binomial name
- Galium sylvaticum L.

= Galium sylvaticum =

Species of plant

Galium sylvaticum, commonly known as wood bedstraw or Scotch mist, is a plant species of the genus Rubiaceae. Its genus name, Galium, is derived from the Greek word for "milk," apparently because some species have been used to curdle milk.

It is native to central Europe: France, Italy, Germany, Poland, Hungary, the former Yugoslavia and smaller countries in between. It is also naturalized in scattered locations in North America (Maine, Vermont, Massachusetts, Connecticut, New York, Ontario, Michigan, Illinois, Wisconsin, Washington and Oregon). It is often found in anthropogenic (man-made or disturbed) habitats, forest edges, meadows and fields.

It is a perennial, branching herb with thin stems. Its leaves are in whorls of six, each narrowly linear. Flowers are in open terminal panicles, white and four-petaled.
