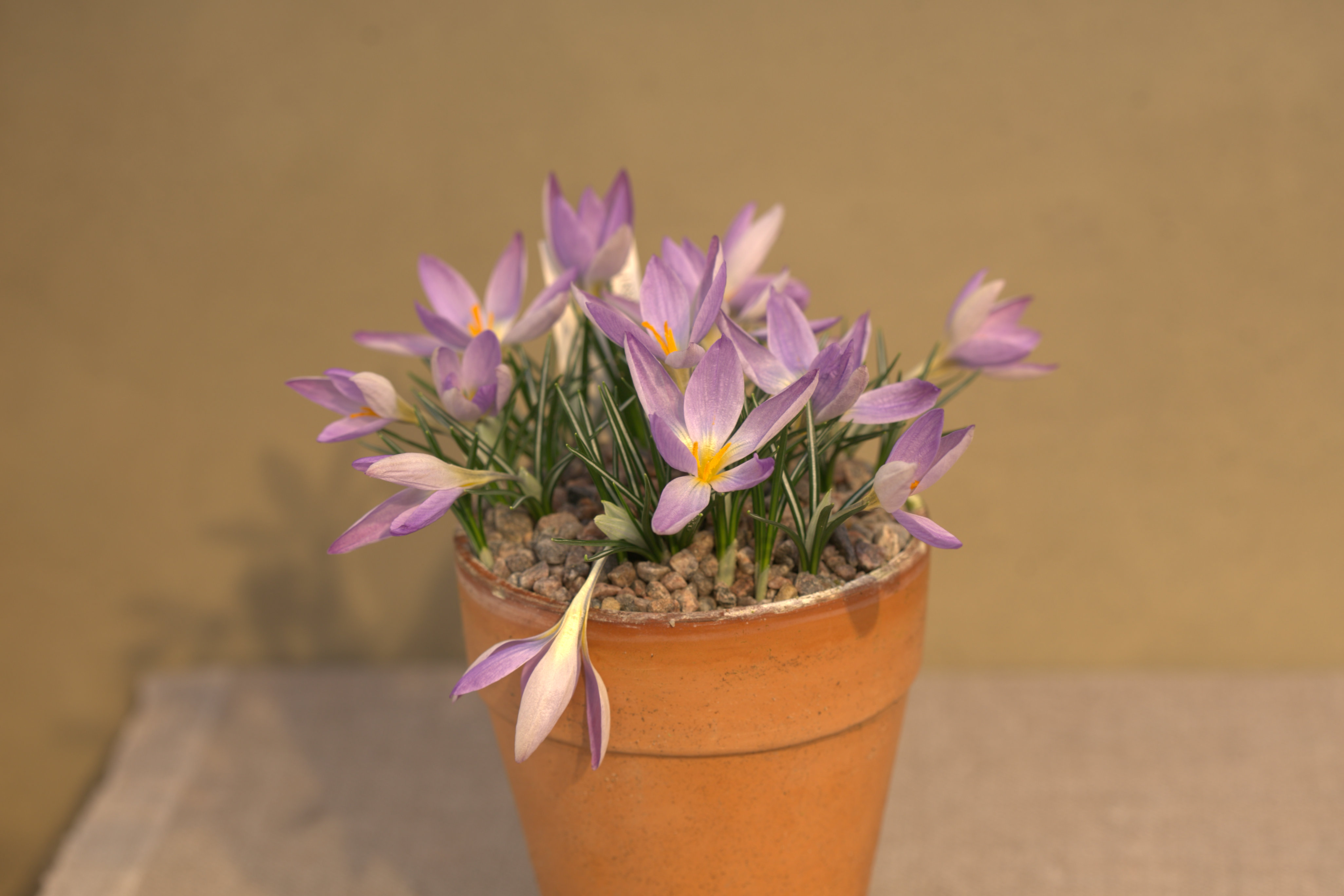
- Crocus dalmaticus

Scientific classification
- Kingdom: Plantae
- Clade: Tracheophytes
- Clade: Angiosperms
- Clade: Monocots
- Order: Asparagales
- Family: Iridaceae
- Genus: Crocus
- Species: C. dalmaticus

Binomial name
- Crocus dalmaticus Vis.

= Crocus dalmaticus =

Species of flowering plant

Crocus dalmaticus is a species of flowering plant in the genus Crocus of the family Iridaceae. It is a cormous perennial native range is from the north western Balkan Peninsula to northwestern Albania.

Crocus dalmaticus is a herbaceous perennial geophyte growing from a corm. It has dark green narrow leaves, the flower is slender and the tepals have pointed ends. Flower colors range from pink-lilac to buff to dark violet, the throat is yellow. The orange stigma is three parted. Flowering occurs in February. Hardy to USDA zone 7.
