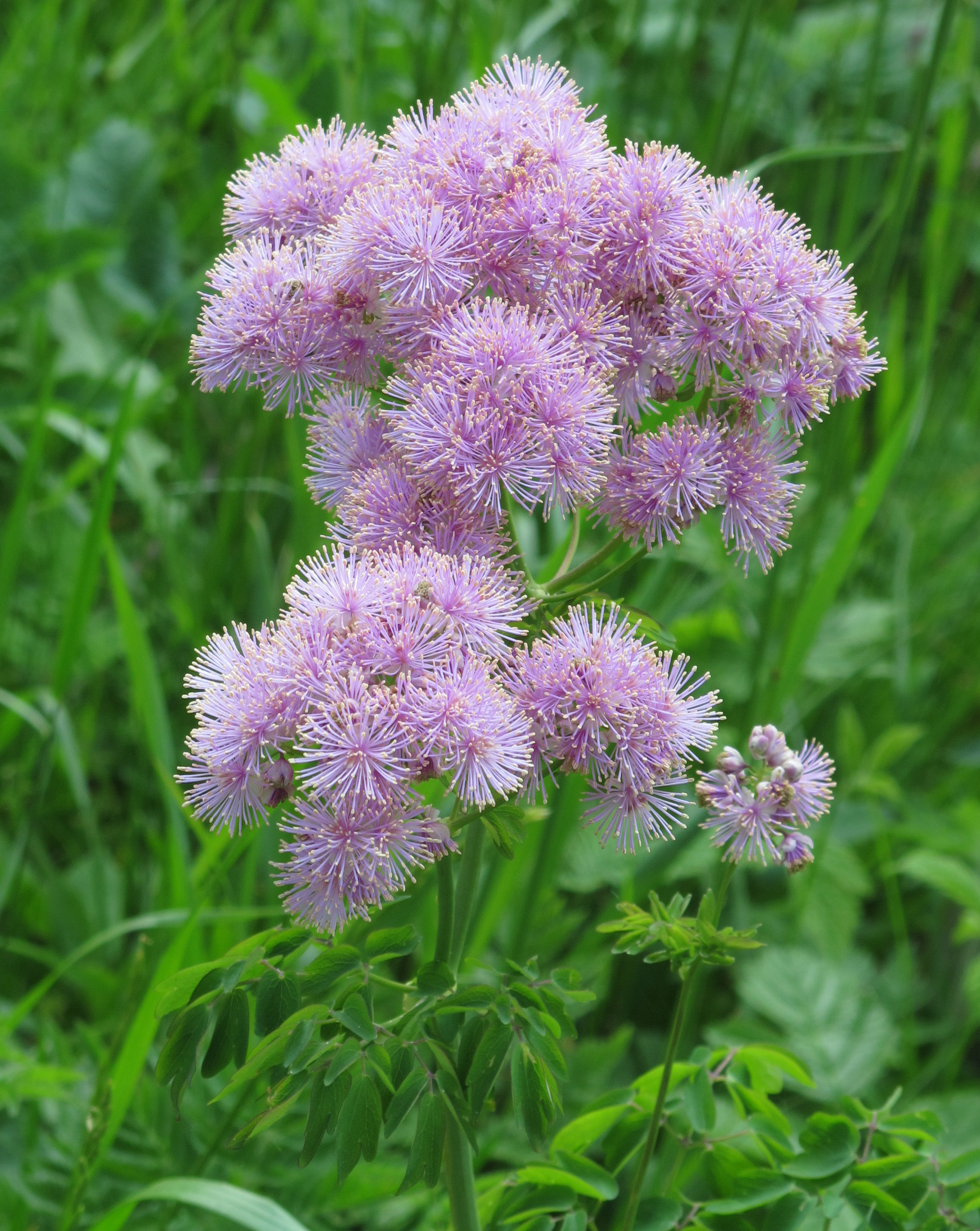

Scientific classification
- Kingdom: Plantae
- Clade: Tracheophytes
- Clade: Angiosperms
- Clade: Eudicots
- Order: Ranunculales
- Family: Ranunculaceae
- Genus: Thalictrum
- Species: T. aquilegiifolium

Binomial name
- Thalictrum aquilegiifolium L. 1753

= Thalictrum aquilegiifolium =

Species of flowering plant

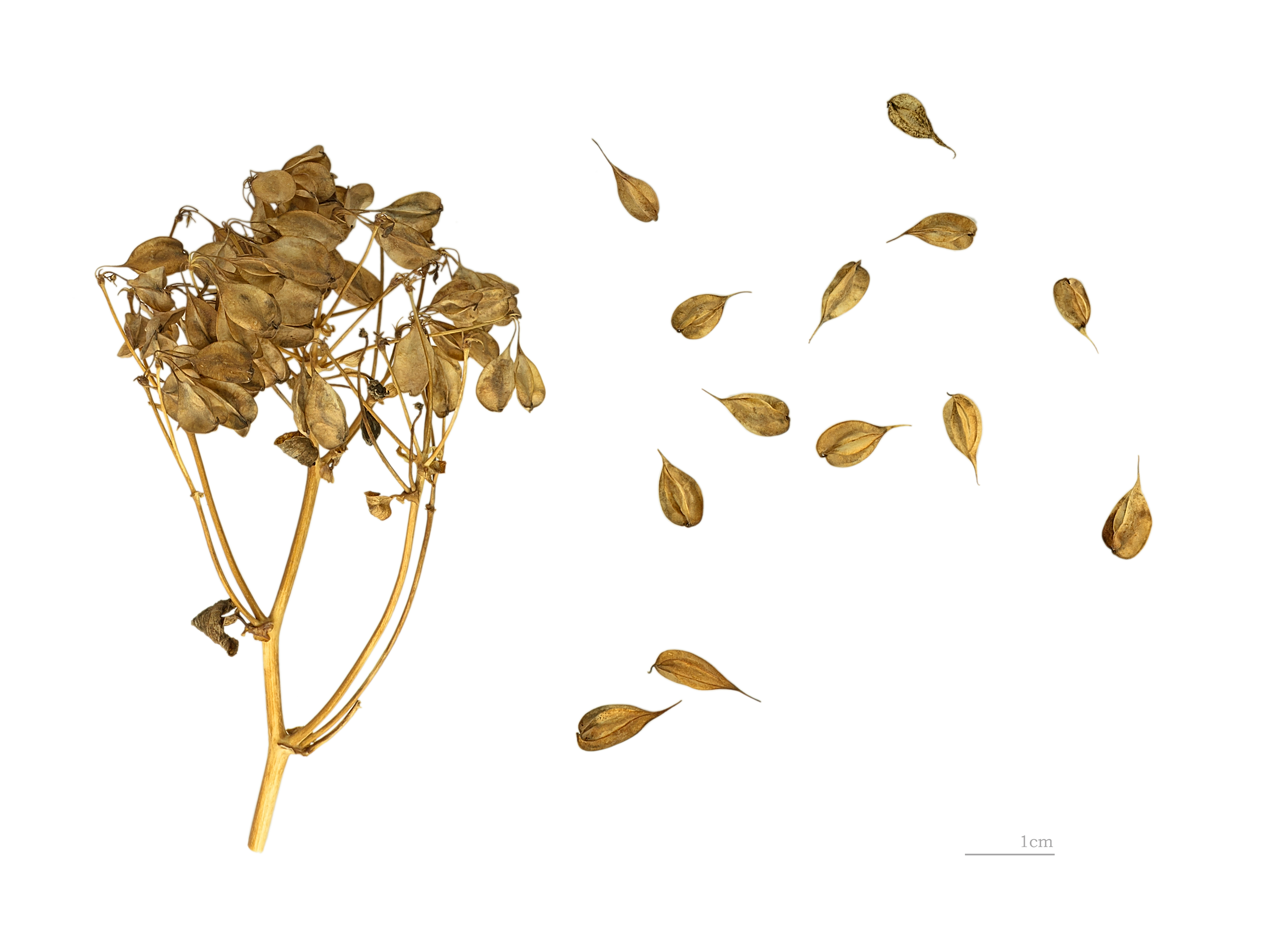
Thalictrum aquilegiifolium

Thalictrum aquilegiifolium is a species of flowering plant in the buttercup family Ranunculaceae. It is known by the common names Siberian columbine meadow-rue, columbine meadow-rue, French meadow-rue, and greater meadow-rue. Its native range extends through Europe and temperate Asia, with a naturalized distribution in North America limited to New York and Ontario.

Growing to 100 cm (39 in) tall by 45 cm (18 in) wide, it is an herbaceous perennial, with leaves composed of frilled leaflets resembling those of aquilegia. In early summer it bears clusters of fluffy pink flowers in flat-topped panicles.

The plant contains an alkaloid thalidisine, which is also present in other Thalictrum species.
