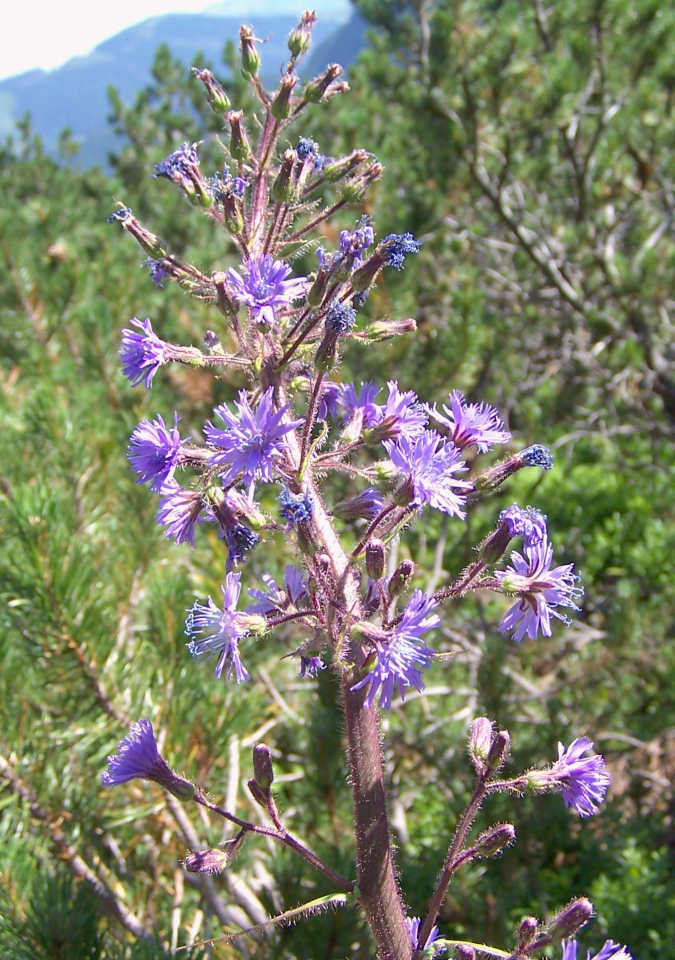
- Cicerbita alpina

Scientific classification
- Kingdom: Plantae
- Clade: Tracheophytes
- Clade: Angiosperms
- Clade: Eudicots
- Clade: Asterids
- Order: Asterales
- Family: Asteraceae
- Subfamily: Cichorioideae
- Tribe: Cichorieae
- Subtribe: Lactucinae
- Genus: Cicerbita; Wallr.

Synonyms
- Agathyrsus D.Don, (1829); Eunoxis Raf., (1838), nom. superfl.; Galathenium Nutt., (1841); Garacium Gren. & Godr., (1850); Kovalevskiella Kamelin, (1993); Steptorhamphus Bunge, (1851)

= Cicerbita =

Genus of flowering plants

Cicerbita is a genus of flowering plants in the family Asteraceae, native to Asia and Europe. They are known commonly as blue sow thistles. The word Cicerbita is from the Italian, meaning "chickory-like", a comparison to Cichorium, the chicory genus.

== Description ==
Cicerbita are usually perennial plants, often with rhizomes. Annual species are also known. The leaves are undivided or pinnate. The flower head has 5 to 30 florets in shades of blue or purple, or occasionally white or yellow. The achene is ribbed and has a pappus of bristles and hairs.

== Systematics ==
The plants of this genus were included in genus Lactuca, the lettuces, until 1822, when the first of them were separated based on the morphology of the fruits. The definition of the genus is still in debate and very unclear.

== Species ==
The following species are recognised in the genus Cicerbita:

- Cicerbita acuminata Grossh.
- Cicerbita adenophora (Boiss. & Kotschy) Beauverd
- Cicerbita alii Roohi Bano & Qaiser
- Cicerbita alpina (L.) Wallr.
- Cicerbita auriculiformis (C.Shih) N.Kilian
- Cicerbita azurea (Ledeb.) Beauverd
- Cicerbita benthamii (C.B.Clarke) Roohi Bano & Qaiser
- Cicerbita boissieri (Rouy) C.Jeffrey
- Cicerbita bourgaei (Boiss.) Beauverd
- Cicerbita brassicifolia (Boiss.) Beauverd
- Cicerbita chiangdaoensis H.Koyama – Thailand
- Cicerbita crambifolia (Bunge) Beauverd
- Cicerbita crassicaulis (Trautv.) Beauverd
- Cicerbita cyprica (Rech.f.) M.Güzel, Coșkunç. & N.Kilian
- Cicerbita deltoidea (M.Bieb.) Beauverd
- Cicerbita × favratii Wilczek
- Cicerbita garrettii (Kerr) H.Koyama
- Cicerbita kovalevskiana Kirp.
- Cicerbita ladyginii (Tzvelev) N.Kilian
- Cicerbita macrophylla (Willd.) Wallr.
- Cicerbita madatapensis Gagnidze
- Cicerbita microcephala (DC.) M.Güzel, Coșkunç. & N.Kilian
- Cicerbita mulgedioides Beauverd
- Cicerbita neglecta (Tzvelev) N.Kilian
- Cicerbita nepalensis Kitam. – Nepal
- Cicerbita nuristanica Kitam. – Afghanistan
- Cicerbita olgae Leskov
- Cicerbita pancicii Beauverd
- Cicerbita persica Beauverd
- Cicerbita picridiformis (Boiss.) Roohi Bano & Qaiser
- Cicerbita plumieri (L.) Kirschl.
- Cicerbita prenanthoides (M.Bieb.) Beauverd
- Cicerbita putii (Kerr) H.Koyama
- Cicerbita racemosa (Willd.) Beauverd
- Cicerbita rechingeriana (Tuisl) Coșkunç., M.Güzel & N.Kilian
- Cicerbita roborowskii (Maxim.) Beauverd
- Cicerbita rosea (Popov & Vved.) Krasch. ex Kovalevsk.
- Cicerbita sonchifolia (Vis. & Pančić) Beauverd
- Cicerbita songarica (Regel) Krasch.
- Cicerbita subplumosa (Kovalevsk.) M.Güzel, Coșkunç. & N.Kilian
- Cicerbita thianschanica Beauverd – Altay Republic, Kazakhstan, Kyrgyzstan, Tajikistan, Uzbekistan, Xinjiang
- Cicerbita variabilis (Bornm.) Bornm.
- Cicerbita zeravschanica Popov – Kyrgyzstan, Tajikistan, Uzbekistan
- Cicerbita zhenduoi (S.W.Liu & T.N.Ho) N.Kilian

== Uses ==
Cicerbita alpina is eaten as a vegetable in Italy, part of its native range. The young shoots are boiled and served in olive oil or tomato sauce. They are considered a delicacy and can be had in restaurants. The shoots in oil can be purchased in markets under the local name insalata dell'orso ("bear salad"). The plant is collected from the wild and there is some concern that it may be threatened with overexploitation, so local ordinances now limit wild collection in some areas. Field trials are underway to examine the possibility of cultivating the plant in agriculture.
