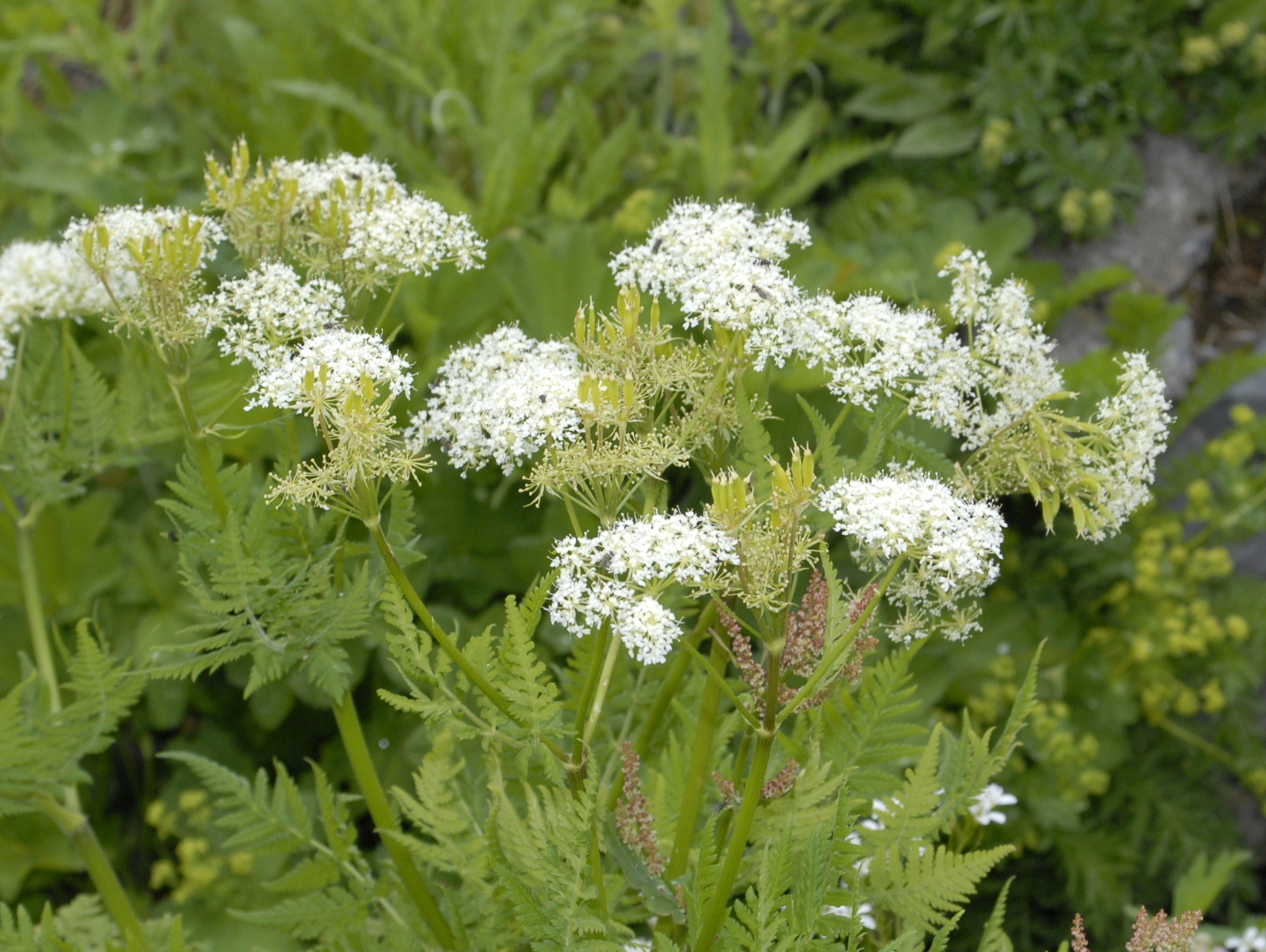
- Flowers of Myrrhis odorata at the Giardino Botanico Alpino Chanousia

Scientific classification
- Kingdom: Plantae
- Clade: Embryophytes
- Clade: Tracheophytes
- Clade: Spermatophytes
- Clade: Angiosperms
- Clade: Eudicots
- Clade: Asterids
- Order: Apiales
- Family: Apiaceae
- Subfamily: Apioideae
- Tribe: Scandiceae
- Subtribe: Scandicinae
- Genus: Myrrhis; Mill.
- Species: M. odorata

Binomial name
- Myrrhis odorata (L.) Scop.

Synonyms
- Chaerophyllum odoratum (L.) Crantz; Lindera odorata (L.) Asch.; Myrrhis brevipedunculata Hoffm.; Myrrhis iberica Hoffm.; Myrrhis sulcata Lag.; Scandix odorata L.; Selinum myrrhis E.H.L.Krause

= Cicely =

Genus of flowering plants in the celery family

Myrrhis odorata, with common names cicely (/ˈsɪsəli/ SISS-ə-lee), sweet cicely, myrrh, garden myrrh, and sweet chervil, is a herbaceous perennial plant belonging to the celery family Apiaceae. It is the only species in the genus Myrrhis.

== Etymology ==
The genus name Myrrhis derives from the Greek word myrrhis (μυρρίς), an aromatic oil from Asia. The Latin specific epithet odorata means 'scented'.

== Description ==
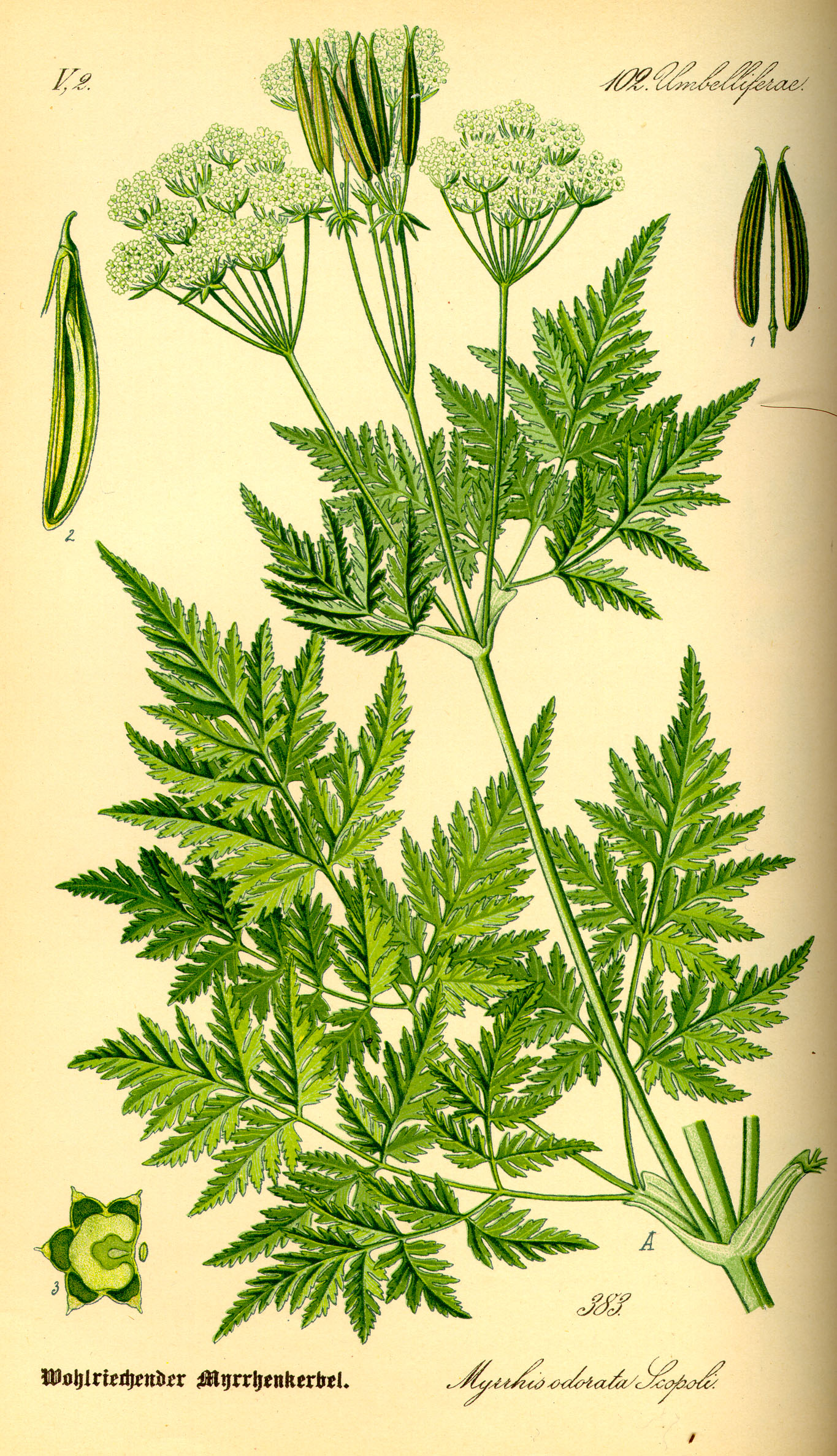
Illustration of Myrrhis odorata

Myrrhis odorata is a tall herbaceous perennial plant growing to 2 metres (6 1/2 ft) tall and 1 m (3 1/2 ft) wide. The leaves are fernlike, 2–4-pinnate, finely divided, feathery, up to 50 centimetres (20 in) long, with whitish patches near the rachis. The plant is softly hairy and smells strongly of aniseed when crushed. The flowers are creamy-white, about 2–4 mm across, produced in large umbels. The flowering period extends from May to June. The fruits are slender, dark brown, 15–25 mm long and 3–4 mm broad.

== Distribution and habitat ==
Myrrhis odorata is native to mountains of southern and central Europe, from the Pyrenees to the Caucasus. It has been introduced and naturalized elsewhere in cultivated areas, woodland margins, roadside verges, river banks and grassland. In the British Isles it is most abundant in northern England and eastern Scotland.

== Cultivation and uses ==
In fertile soils it grows readily from seed, and may be increased by division in spring or autumn.

Its leaves are sometimes used as a herb, either raw or cooked, with a rather strong or sweet taste similar to anise. Also edible are the roots (cooked like parsnips) and seeds (chewed raw). It has a history of use as a medicinal herb.

Like its relatives anise, fennel, and caraway, it can be used to flavour akvavit. Its essential oils are dominated by anethole.
