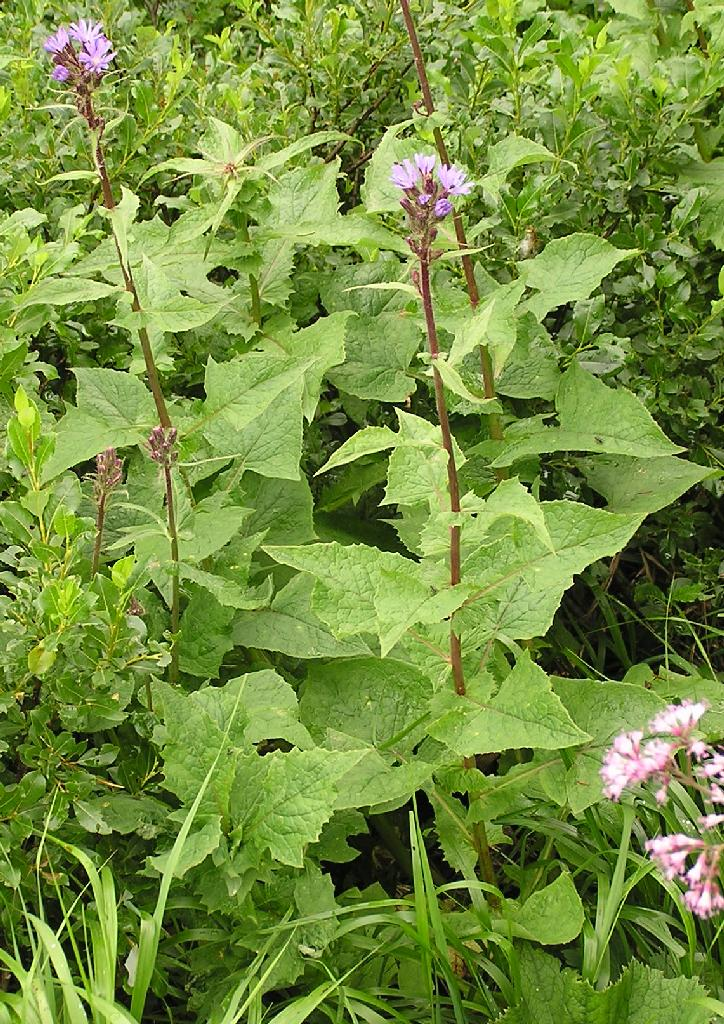

Conservation status
- Least Concern (IUCN 3.1)

Scientific classification
- Kingdom: Plantae
- Clade: Tracheophytes
- Clade: Angiosperms
- Clade: Eudicots
- Clade: Asterids
- Order: Asterales
- Family: Asteraceae
- Genus: Cicerbita
- Species: C. alpina

Binomial name
- Cicerbita alpina (L.) Wallr. 1822

Synonyms
- Synonymy: Lactuca alpina (L.) A. Gray; Mulgedium alpinum (L.) Less.; Sonchus alpinus L. 1753; Aracium alpinum (L.) Monnier; Geracium alpinum (L.) Gren. & Godr.; Hieracium coeruleum Scop.; Mulgedium multiflorum DC.; Picridium alpinum (L.) Philippe; Sonchus alpestris Clairv.; Sonchus canadensis L.; Sonchus coeruleus Sm.; Sonchus montanus Lam.; Sonchus multiflorus Desf.; Sonchus pallidus Torr. 1826 not Willd. 1803; Sonchus racemosus Lam.

= Cicerbita alpina =

Species of flowering plant

Cicerbita alpina, commonly known as the alpine sow-thistle or alpine blue-sow-thistle is a perennial herbaceous species of plant formerly placed in the genus Lactuca as Lactuca alpina. It is native to upland and mountainous parts of Europe.

It was once used as an herb in Sami cooking, and known as jierja.

== Description ==
Cicerbita alpina on average reaches 80 centimetres (31 in) in height, with a minimum height of 50 cm (20 in) and a maximum height of 150 cm (59 in). The stem is erect and usually unbranched. It has glandular hairs and contains a white milky juice, a kind of latex. The alternate leaves are broad, triangular and clasping the stem, bluish-grey beneath, hairy along the veins and with toothed margins. The inflorescence is a panicle. Each composite flower is about 2.5 cm (1 in) wide and is set within a whorl of bracts. The individual blue-violet florets are tongue-like with a toothed, truncated tip, each having five stamens and a fused carpel. All the florets are ray florets; there are no disc florets. The seeds are clothed in unbranched hairs. The flowering period extends from June to September in the temperate northern hemisphere.

== Distribution and habitat ==
Cicerbita alpina grows on many mountains of Europe (the Alps, the Pyrenees, the northern Apennines, the Scandinavian Peninsula, Scotland (where it is endangered and found in only four known locations), the Carpathians and the Urals. These plants can be found in alpine woods, besides streams, in rich-soil in hollows and in tall meadows, usually between 1,000 and 1,800 metres (3,280 and 5,910 ft) above sea level.

=== Conservation ===
It became a protected species in the UK in 1975 under the Conservation of Wild Creatures and Wild Plants Act.

== Ecology ==
In Finland, this plant is known as "bear-hay" because the Eurasian brown bear feeds on it, as do elk and reindeer. People also sometimes make use of it and eat it raw or cooked in reindeer milk.

== Secondary metabolites ==
The edible shoots of Cicerbita alpina contain 8-O-Acetyl-15-beta-D-glucopyranosyllactucin, which causes the bitter taste of the vegetable, and caffeic acid derivatives chlorogenic acid, 3,5-dicaffeoylquinic acid, caffeoyltartaric acid, and cichoric acid.

== Gallery ==
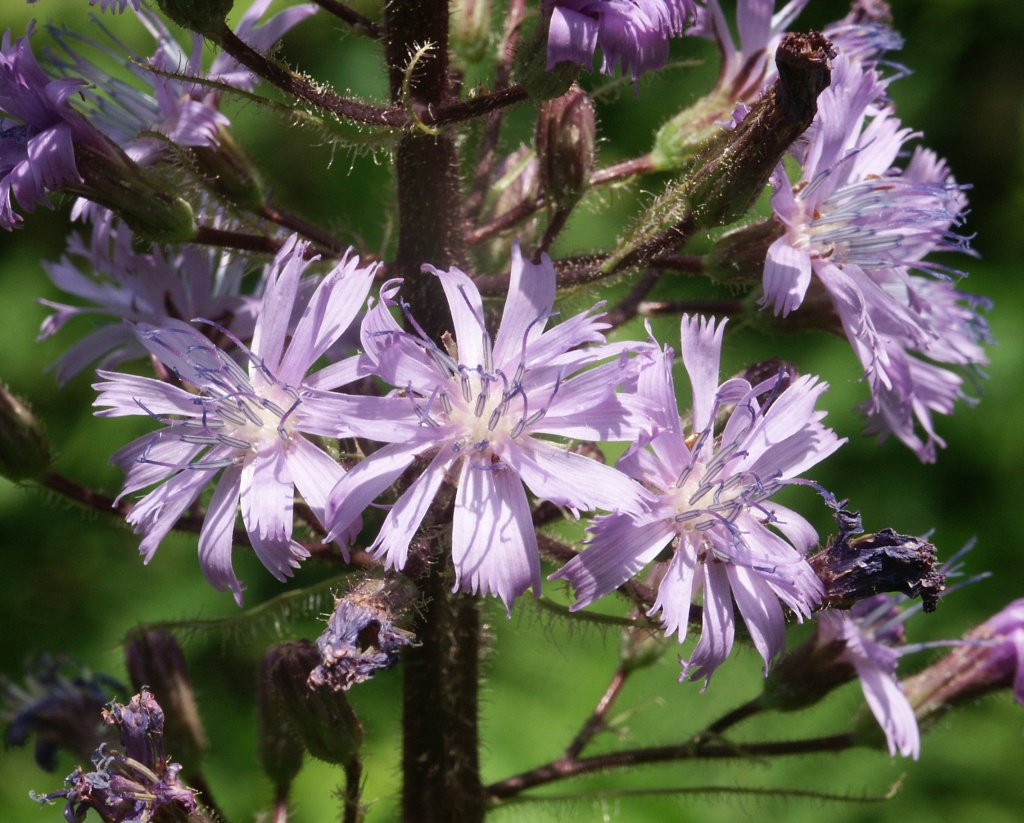
Flowers of Cicerbita alpina

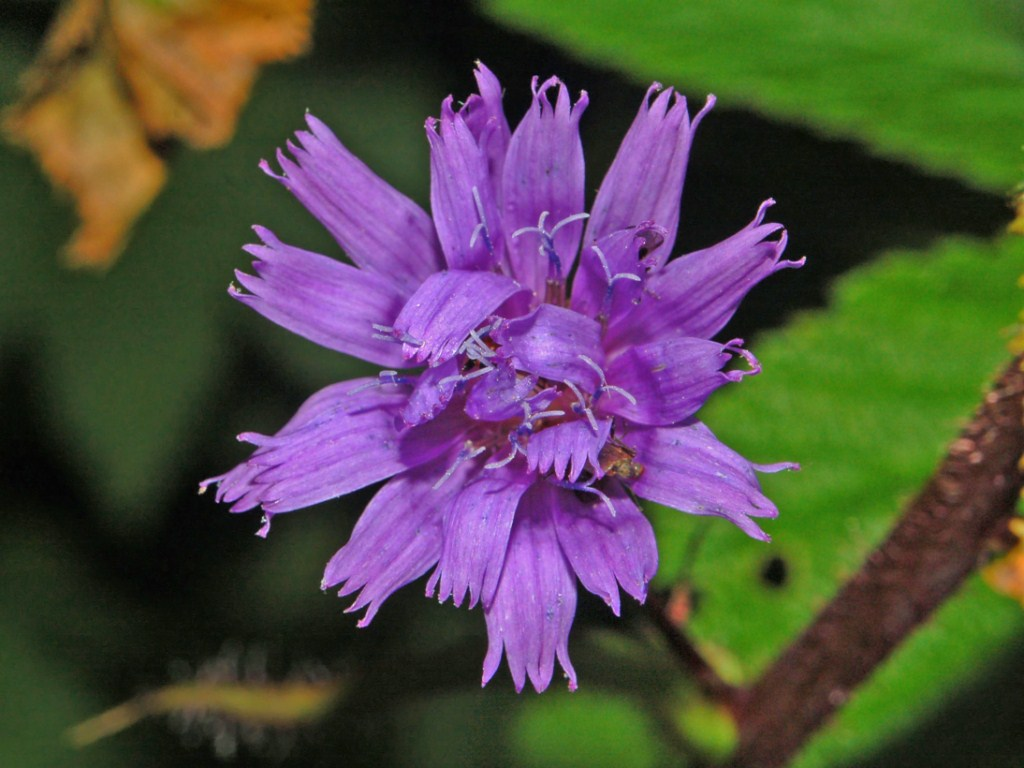
Flower of Cicerbita alpina''

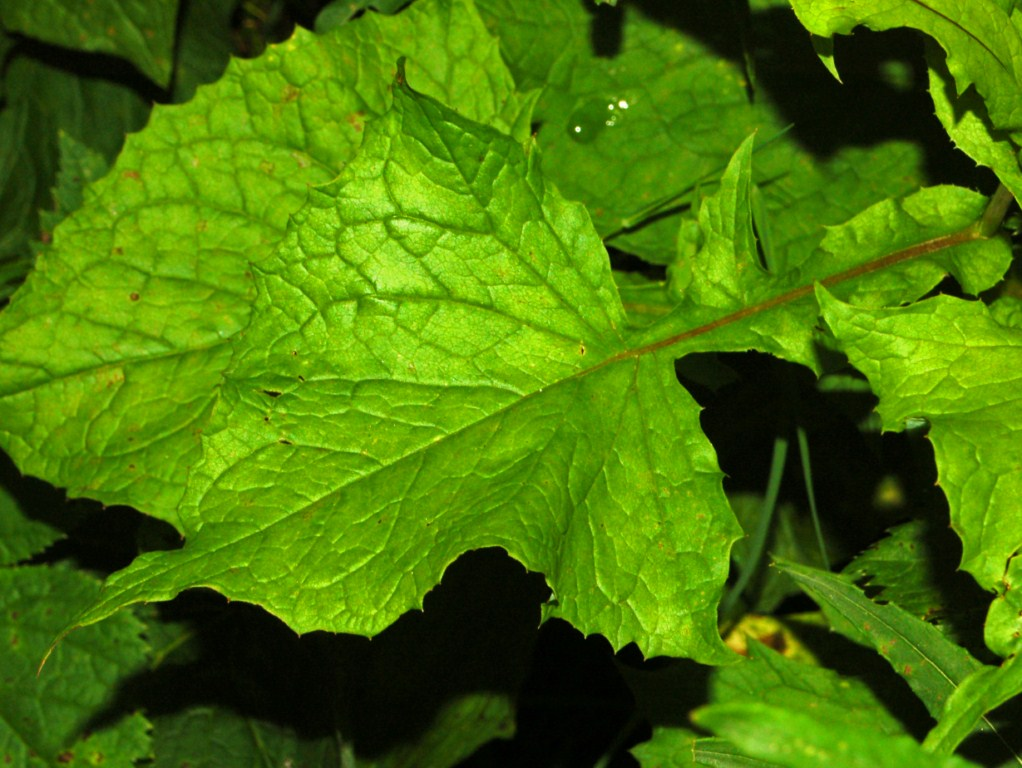
Leaf of Cicerbita alpina''
