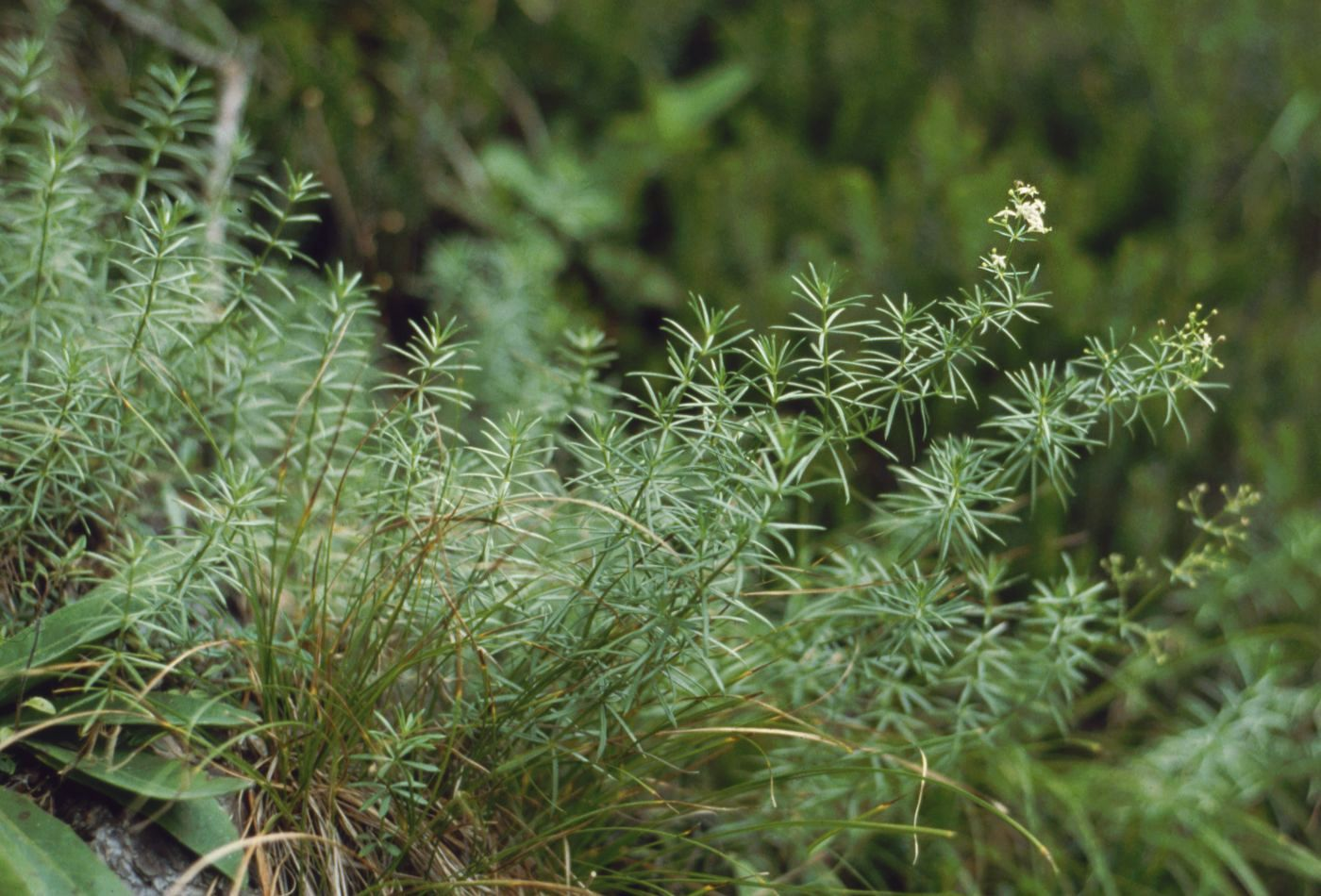

Scientific classification
- Kingdom: Plantae
- Clade: Tracheophytes
- Clade: Angiosperms
- Clade: Eudicots
- Clade: Asterids
- Order: Gentianales
- Family: Rubiaceae
- Genus: Galium
- Species: G. lucidum

Binomial name
- Galium lucidum All.

= Galium lucidum =

Lucid bedstraw

Species of plant

Galium lucidum is a species of plants in the Rubiaceae. It is native to the Mediterranean region, from Portugal and Morocco to Greece, the range extending northwards into Germany.

Galium lucidum is an erect, perennial, glabrous plant up to 70 cm tall. Leaves are narrow and linear, up to 3 cm long, whorled with as many as 10 per node. Inflorescence is a large terminal panicle of many small, white to cream-colored flowers.

== Subspecies ==
Five subspecies are currently recognized (February 2025):

- Galium lucidum subsp. corrudifolium (Vill.) Bonnier – Albania, Balearic Islands, Corsica, France, Italy, Spain, and former Yugoslavia
- Galium lucidum subsp. fruticescens (Cav.) O.Bolòs & Vigo – central-northern and eastern Spain
- Galium lucidum subsp. krendlii Natali - Corsica
- Galium lucidum subsp. lucidum - most of species range
- Galium lucidum subsp. venustum (Jord.) Arcang – Corsica, Sicily, Sardinia, central Italy
