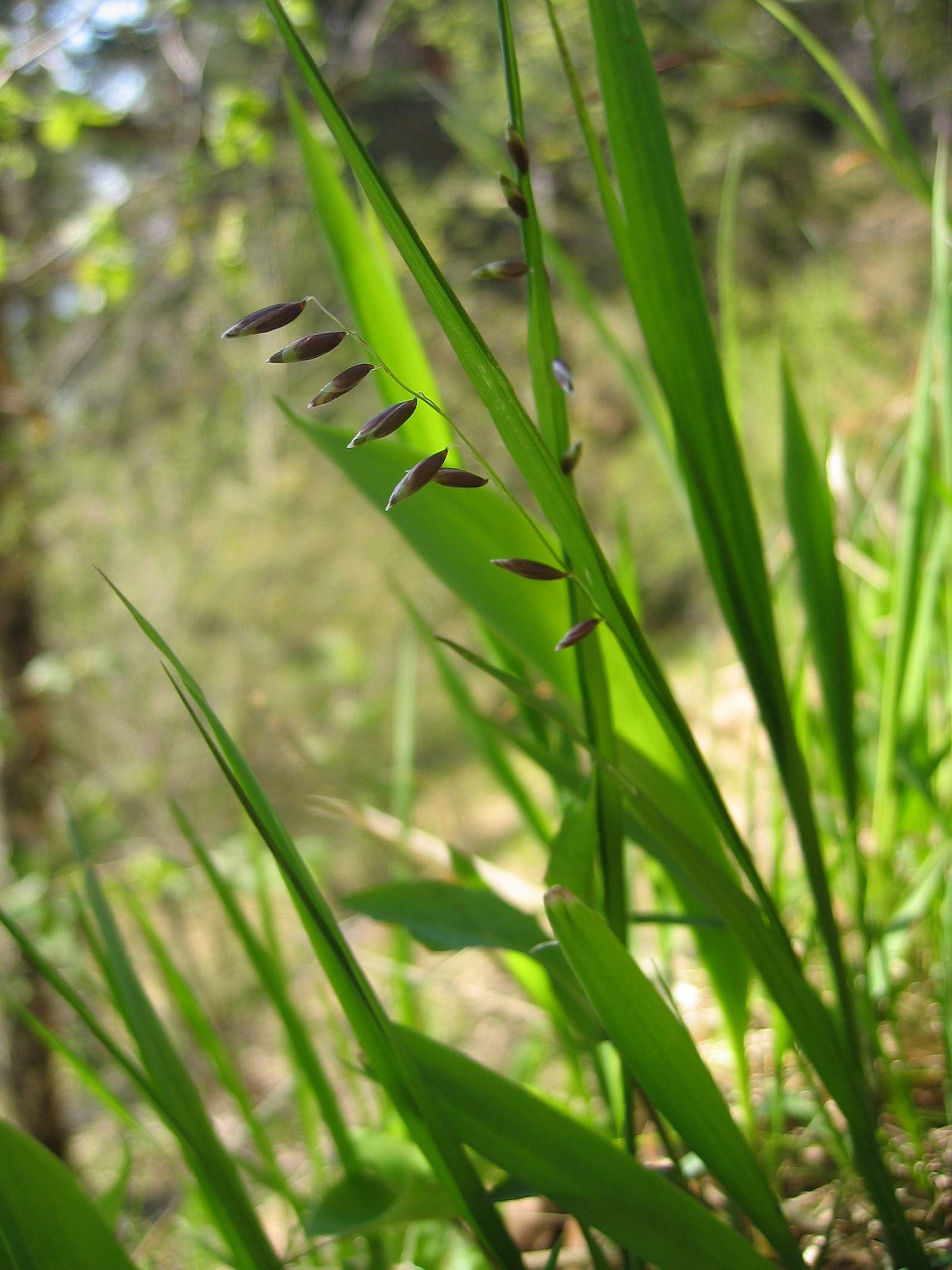

Scientific classification
- Kingdom: Plantae
- Clade: Tracheophytes
- Clade: Angiosperms
- Clade: Monocots
- Clade: Commelinids
- Order: Poales
- Family: Poaceae
- Subfamily: Pooideae
- Genus: Melica
- Species: M. nutans

Binomial name
- Melica nutans L.

= Melica nutans =

Species of grass

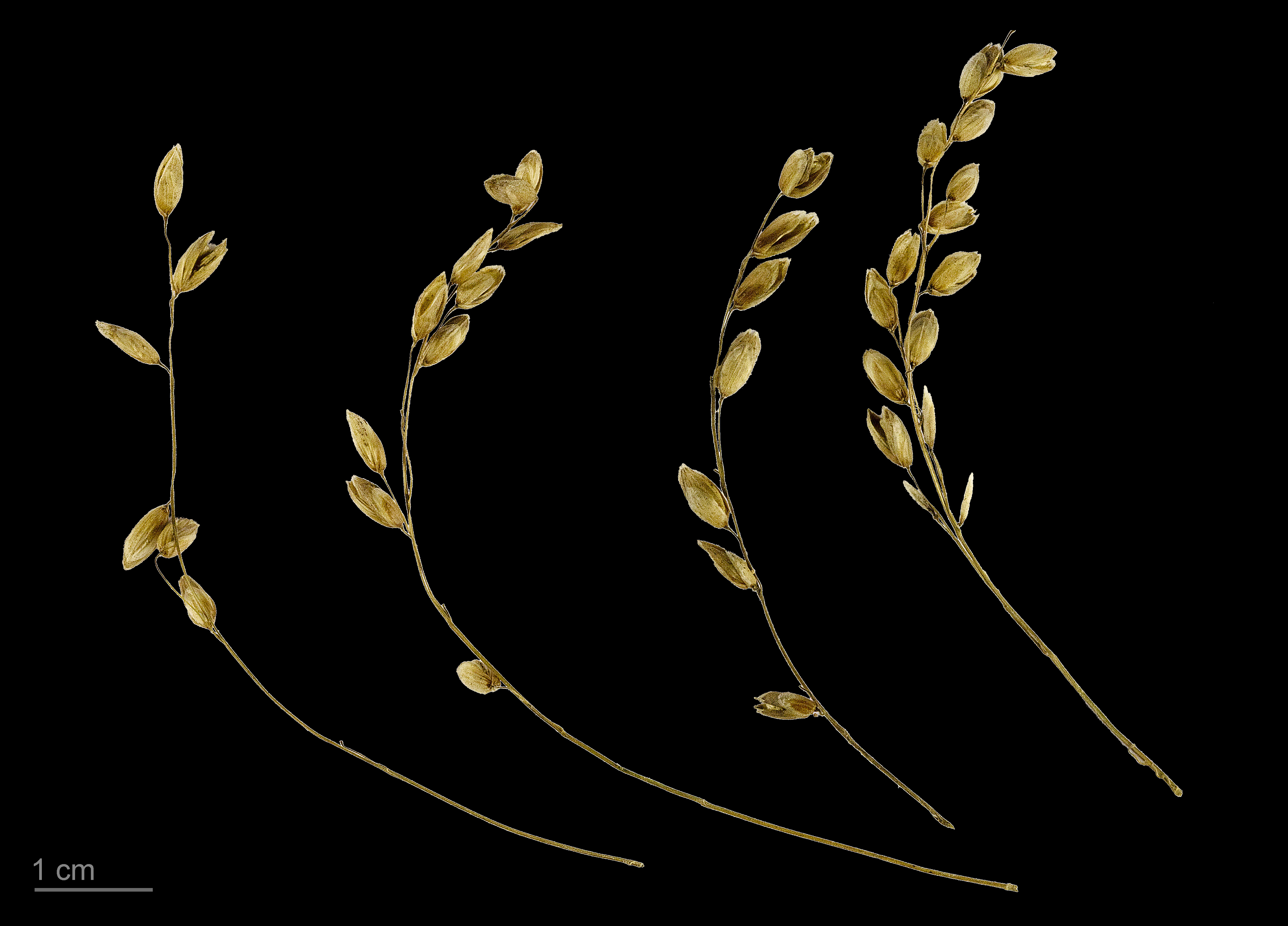
Seed heads

Melica nutans, known as mountain melick, is a grass species in the family Poaceae, native to European and Asian forests.

== Description ==
The grass has slender creeping rhizomes. The culms are 25–970 centimetres (9.8–381.9 in) tall. It inflorescence is comprised out of 5–15 fertile spikelets, which are both oblong and compressed, with the length of 6–8 millimetres (0.24–0.31 in). They are comprise out of 2-3 fertile florets that are diminished at the apex. The florets are 5–7 millimetres (0.20–0.28 in) long and are elliptic. Flowers have 3 anthers which are 1.5–2 millimetres (0.059–0.079 in) in length. Glumes are thinner than fertile lemma with the lower one being of 4–6 millimetres (0.16–0.24 in) which is one length of upper one.

== Habitat ==
It is found at 100–2,300 metres (330–7,550 ft) of elevation, in shady and hillside habitats.
