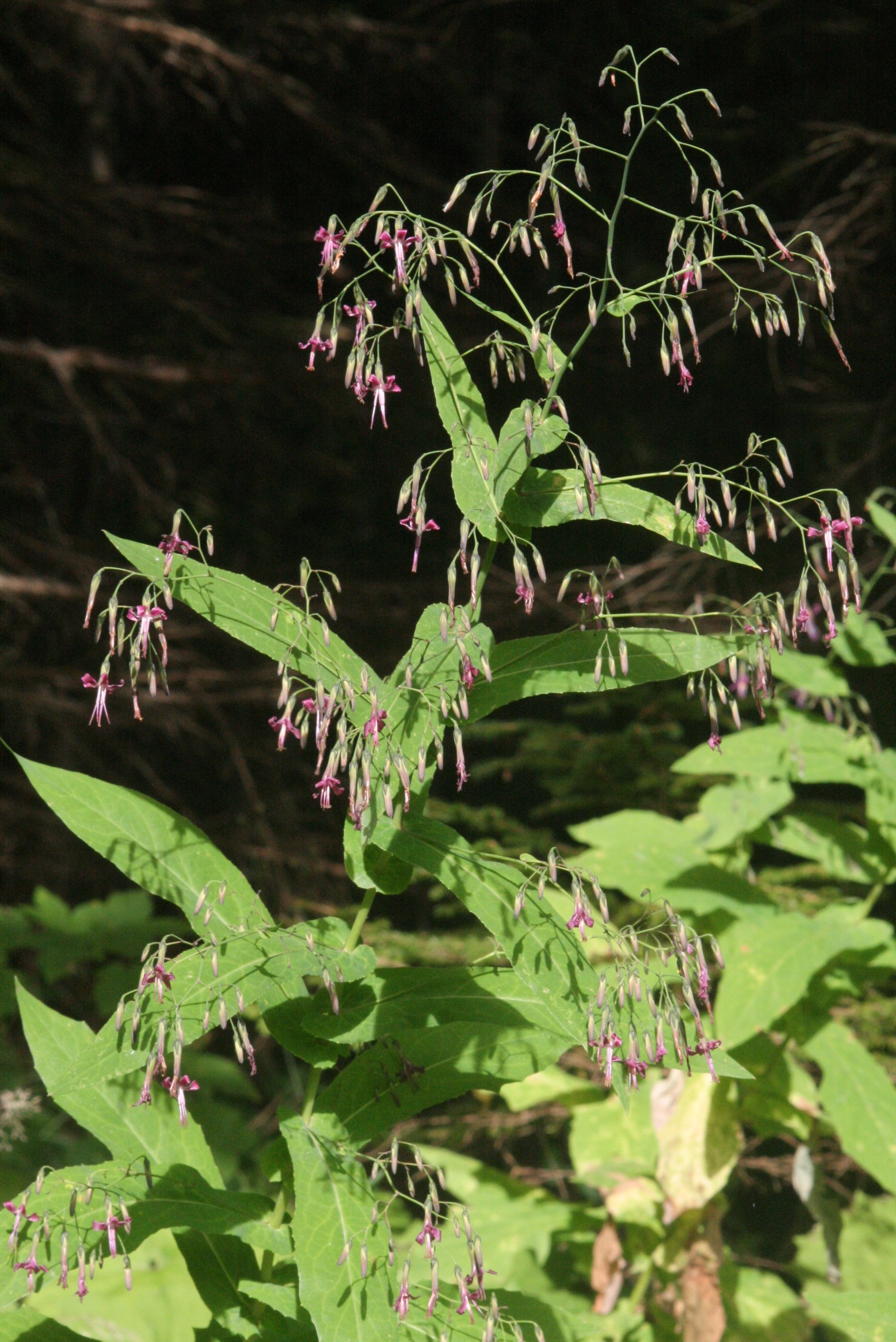

Scientific classification
- Kingdom: Plantae
- Clade: Tracheophytes
- Clade: Angiosperms
- Clade: Eudicots
- Clade: Asterids
- Order: Asterales
- Family: Asteraceae
- Genus: Prenanthes
- Species: P. purpurea

Binomial name
- Prenanthes purpurea L.

Synonyms
- List: Chondrilla purpurea Lam.; Chondrilla tenuifolia Lam.; Hieracium prenanthes E.H.L.Krause; Hylethale purpurea Link; Prenanthes amplexicaulis Mill.; Prenanthes purpurea var. angustifolia W.D.J.Koch; Prenanthes purpurea var. intermedia Rouy; Prenanthes purpurea var. querciformis Murr; Prenanthes purpurea subsp. tenuifolia (L.) Arcang.; Prenanthes purpurea var. tenuifolia (L.) St.-Lag.; Prenanthes tenuifolia L.; Prenanthes wolfiana Schur

= Prenanthes purpurea =

Species of plant

Prenanthes purpurea is a species of flowering plant in the family Asteraceae, native from Europe to northeastern Turkey and the Caucasus. It was first described by Carl Linnaeus in 1753. The species is sometimes called purple lettuce.
