= Mikhail Vielgorsky =

Russian composer

Mikhail Yuryevich Vielgorsky
- Михаил Юрьевич Виельгорский
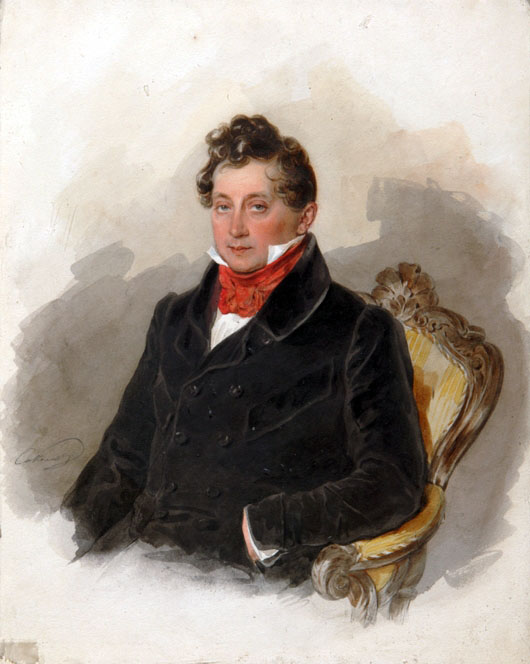
- Born: 22 November 1788; Saint Petersburg, Russia
- Died: 21 September 1856 (aged 67); Moscow
- Occupations: Chamberlain and Musician
- Spouses: 1. с 1812 Princess Katharina Biron of Courland (1793-1813); 2. с 1816 Princess Louise Biron of Courland (1791-1853)
- Children: 2 sons and 4 daughters
- Parents: Yuri Mikhailovich Vielgorsky (1753-1807) (father); Sophia Dmitryevna Matyushkina (1755-1796) (mother)

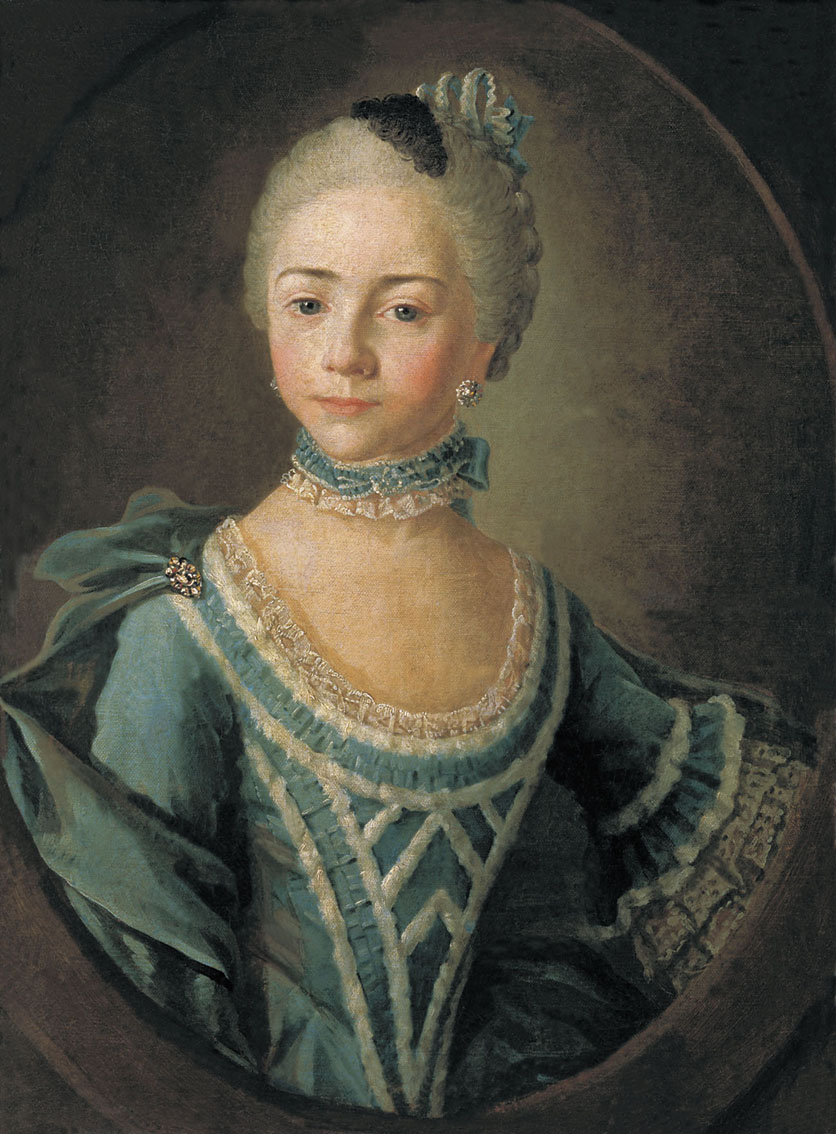
Mikhail's mother, Countess Sophia Dmitrievna Matyushkina (1755–1796), later lady in waiting to Catherine the Great

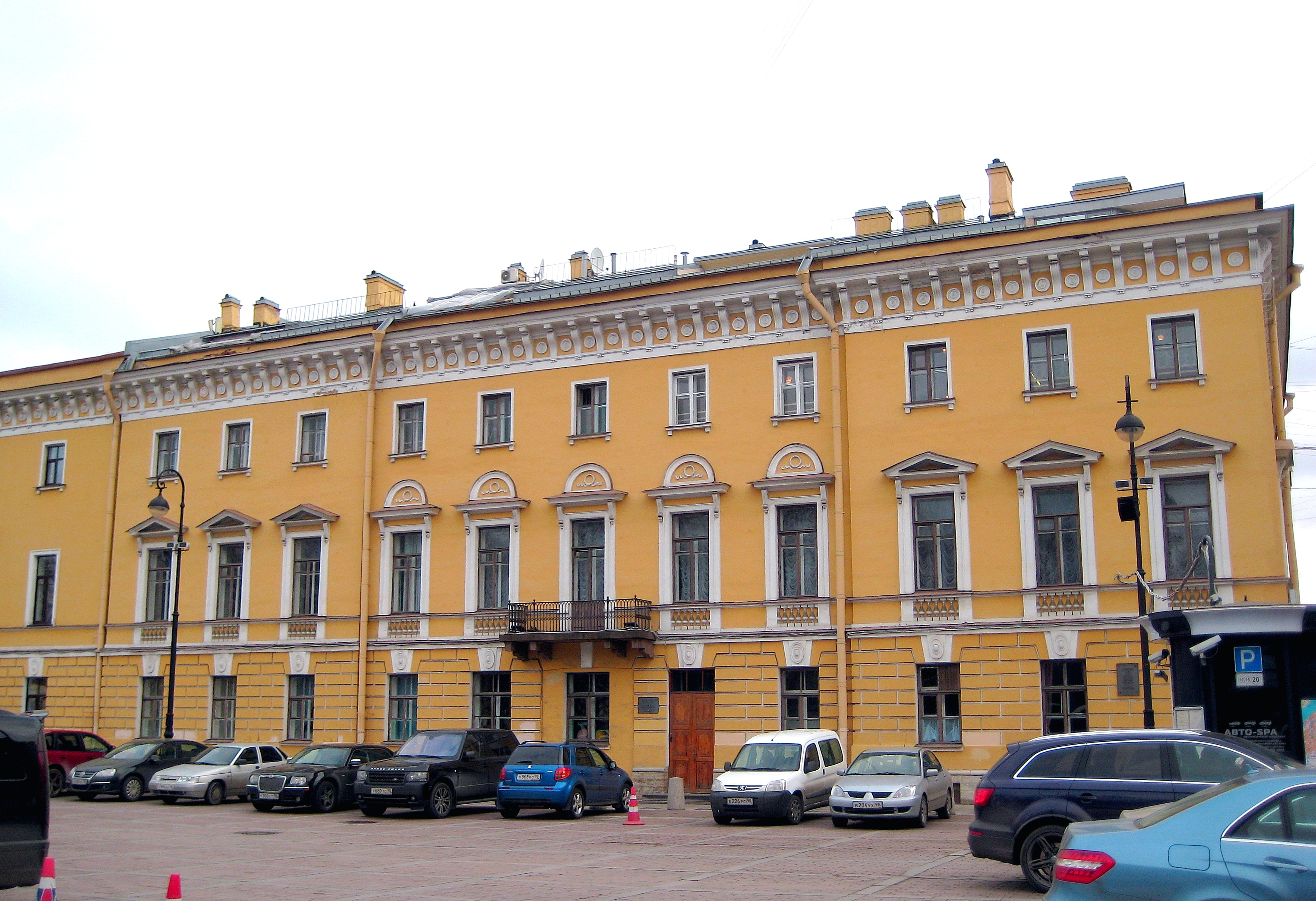
Vielgorsky palace, Saint Petersburg

Count Mikhail Vielgorsky (Polish: Michał Wielhorski, Russian: Михаил Юрьевич Виельгорский); (22 November 1788 – 21 September 1856) was a Russian official and composer of Polish descent. He composed romances, symphonies, an opera and was an amateur singer, violinist, and patron of the arts.

He is considered to be one of the major influences on the musical arts in Russia during the 19th-century because of his salons, responsible with bringing the string quartet to Russia. Along with his brother Matvey Vielgorsky, they were considered the "brothers of harmony" for their intrepid and comprehensive patronage of the musical arts.

Vielgorsky was a friend of Ludwig van Beethoven and an admirer of his music; the Russian premiere of Beethoven's Ninth Symphony took place at Vielgorsky's home in Saint Petersburg in 1836. The same year, Mikhail Glinka rehearsed parts of his new opera A Life for the Tsar at Vielgorsky's home, accompanied by the enserfed orchestra of Prince Yusupov. In the 1830s and 1840s, as Richard Stites notes, Vielgorsky's salon "played host to the most celebrated musical visitors to mid-century Russia: Liszt, Berlioz, the Schumanns, and Pauline Viardot among others ... Because of the attendance of Gogol, Zhukovsky, Vyazemsky, Lermontov, Odoevsky, Glinka, Dargomyzhsky, and Bryullov, a contemporary dubbed Vielgorsky's home "a lively and original multifaceted academy of the arts.' Berlioz called it 'a little ministry of fine arts.'"

Vielgorsky presided over his salons donning simple garments and entertaining various different classes of guests, informality considered remarkable for the time.

== Childhood ==
Vielgorsky was the son of Polish szlachcic [envoy] Jerzy Wielhorski, and the brother of Maciej Wielhorski (Matvey Valigorsky, 1794–1866), an amateur cellist who founded the Society of Lovers of Music with Prince Nikolai Borisovich Galitzin (also a friend of Beethoven) in 1828. His mother was Countess Sophia Dmitrievna Matyushkina (1755–1796), lady in waiting to Catherine the Great.

== Education ==
Mikhail Vielgorsky had a special passion for music and was known to be an excellent performer and composer. And although an amateur, according to Schumann, was "a genius amateur." He also had said that Vielgorsky was "the most ingenious dilettante I have ever known." Already in childhood, he showed outstanding musical abilities: he played the violin well and tried to compose. Vielgorski received a comprehensive musical education and studied music theory and harmony with the Spanish composer Vincente Martin-y-Soler, as well as composition with the German conductor and pianist Wilhelm Taubert. Back in 1804, when living Riga with his family, Vielgorsky took part in music-making in the evenings: the part of the first violin was performed by his father, the viola - by himself, and the cello part - by his brother Matvey, another musician-performer. Vielgorsky continued his studies of composition in Paris with Luigi Cherubini.

== Profession ==
Mikhail Vielgorsky, alongside his compositional work and musicianship, acted as an Actual Privy Councilor to Catherine II or Catherine The Great.

== Musician ==
Vielgorsky continued his musical career, meeting Ludwig van Beethoven in Vienna and was among the first eight listeners to perform his Symphony No.6 called the "Pastoral" symphony. Throughout his life, Vielgorsky remained an ardent admirer of the German composer.

He was one of the first in Russia to master large sonata-symphonic forms, writing two symphonies (the first was performed in 1825 in Moscow), a string quartet, and two overtures. He also created variations for Cello and Orchestra, pieces for piano, romances, vocal ensembles, as well as a number of choral works. Vielgorsky's romances became very popular in Russia and one of his romances ("I Loved") was readily performed by Mikhail Glinka. Vielgorsky noted that his opera "Gypsies" was based on a plot related to the events of the Patriotic War of 1812 (libretto by V. Zhukovsky and V. Sollogub).

Vielgorsky's palace became a kind of musical center. Known to host many connoisseurs and composers, many compositions were performed there for the first time. Vielgorsky's palace saw Franz Liszt play for the first time from the sheet (from the score) Ruslana and Lyudmila by Glinka. Poet Dmitry Venevitinov called Vielgorsky's house "the academy of musical taste", while famous French composer Hector Berlioz, who came to Russia only twice, called his home "a small temple of fine arts". Vielgorsky managed to attract many musicians to his Luizino estate in the Kursk province. In the 1820s, all nine of Beethoven's symphonies were performed on his estate during his evening salons. Vielgorsky showed appreciation for Glinka's music and considered his opera Ivan Susanin, later more commonly named A Life for the Tsar, a masterpiece.

Vielgorsky provided support to many progressive figures in Russia. In 1838, together with the poet Vladimir Zhukovsky, he organized a lottery, the proceeds from which went to the ransom from the serfdom of the Ukrainian poet and outspoken political figure Taras Grigorovich Shevchenko.

Mikhail Vielgorsky died on 9 September 1856, in Moscow. His son-in-law Count Vladinmir Sollogub eulogised his mild and unassuming personality:

"Count Vielgorsky passed unnoticed in Russian life; even in the society in which he lived, he was appreciated by only a few. He did not seek fame, shied away from the struggle and, despite the fact - or, perhaps, precisely because, - he was an extraordinary person: a philosopher, critic, linguist, physician, theologian, hermeticist, honorary member of all Masonic lodges, the soul of all societies, a family man, epicurean, courtier, dignitary, artist, musician, comrade, judge, he was a living encyclopedia of the deepest knowledge, an example of the most tender feelings and the most playful mind. "

He is buried in the Lazarevskoye Cemetery of the Alexander Nevsky Lavra in St. Petersburg.

== Friendship with Maria Sergeyevna Durnovo ==
Mikhail Vielgorsky knew Maria Sergeyevna Durnovo (Griboyedova), a skilled piano performer and sister of famous Russian writer Alexander Griboyedov. According to the memoirs of Maria Durnovo: "Very often, the writer came to the sister's room. In the spring of 1823, whereas famed comedy remained a secret to public and majority of friends, Mikhail Vielgorsky, stumbled on several sheets of poem, written by the hand of Alexander Griboyedov, while assembling pages of sheet music on the piano of Maria Sergeyevna. Maria wanted to hide the accidentally discovered pages, but it was too late. The news of the new comedy rapidly spread around Moscow from the mouth of the well-known at the time musician". That poem was Woe from Wit, still considered to be "golden classic" in Russia and other Russian-speaking countries.

== Family ==
The first wife of Mikhail Vielgorsky was Princess Catherine Biron von Courland (1792–1813), maid of honor the Empress of Russia, and the niece of the last Duke of Courland. This marriage was facilitated by Empress Maria Feodorovna, with the wedding taking place February 1812 in the Great Church of the Winter Palace. This marriage strengthened Vielgorsky's position at court.

In the memoirs of a contemporary, Ekaterina Biron is described as a sweet, naive child who loved lace and outfits. After the wedding, the Vielgorskys moved to Moscow, shortly before the Patriotic War began. Fleeing from the city during the french invasion, they left for one of their country estates. In January 1813, the Vielgorskys decided to return to Moscow whilst Catherine was heavily pregnant. Having hardly reached Moscow, the Vielgorskys settled in the house of Prince Golitsyn, where Catherine died as a result of complications arising during childbirth, most likely puerperal fever. Their relative wrote about this tragedy:

The fate of poor Katisha can serve as a lesson for those who want to take advantage of it. Fearing to give birth far from Petersburg, that is, without the help of weak medicine, she embarked on a journey that cost her her life. The Vielgorskys drove out into the very muddy road, so Katisha arrived in Ryazan completely broken. During the ride, she felt the greatest suffering ... Even healthy men, arriving from Moscow, complain that they were all shaken. The unfortunate Vielgorsky had a very bad time. They somehow made it to Moscow, where the unfortunate woman suffered for forty hours and finally gave birth to a daughter. The day after the birth, she became delirious ... For six days she suffered and died without communion ... It is a pity for Michel, especially since he ascribes his misfortune to himself.

— A letter from M. A. Volkova to V. I. Lanskoy (1812-1818)

=== Second Marriage ===
In 1816, Mikhail Vielgorsky secretly married the elder sister of his first wife Princess Louise Biron von Courland (1791–1853), the maid of honor of the Empress Maria Feodorovna. Such a marriage according to church rules was considered illegal. By this, he incurred disgrace and was forced to leave for his estate Luizino in the Kursk province. The Vielgorskys lived in this estate for several years. Their children were born there:

- Joseph Mikhailovich (1817–1839), a friend of Gogol, died of consumption in Rome, his short life is devoted to the book and an excerpt of Gogol "Nights at the Villa."
- Apollinaria Mikhailovna (5 November 1818 – 1884), baptized on November 8, 1818, in the Church of the Ascension, goddaughter of Count G I Chernyshev and V I Lanskoy; since 1843 she was married to A. V. Venevitinov, brother of the poet D. V. Venevitinov.
- Sofya Mikhailovna (1820–1878), since 1840 the wife of the writer V. A. Sollogub.
- Mikhail Mikhailovich (1822– 21 November 1855), state councilor, full member of the Red Cross Society, from 1853 by the Imperial decree was called Count Vielgorsky-Matyushkin. Died of brain inflammation in Simferopol.
- Anna Mikhailovna (1823–1861), since 1858 the wife of Prince Alexander Ivanovich Shakhovsky (1822–1891). According to some memoirists, N. V. Gogol was in love with her. Gogol allegedly wanted to marry her, but knowing that Louise Vielgorskaya would not agree to an unequal marriage for her daughter, he did not make an offer.
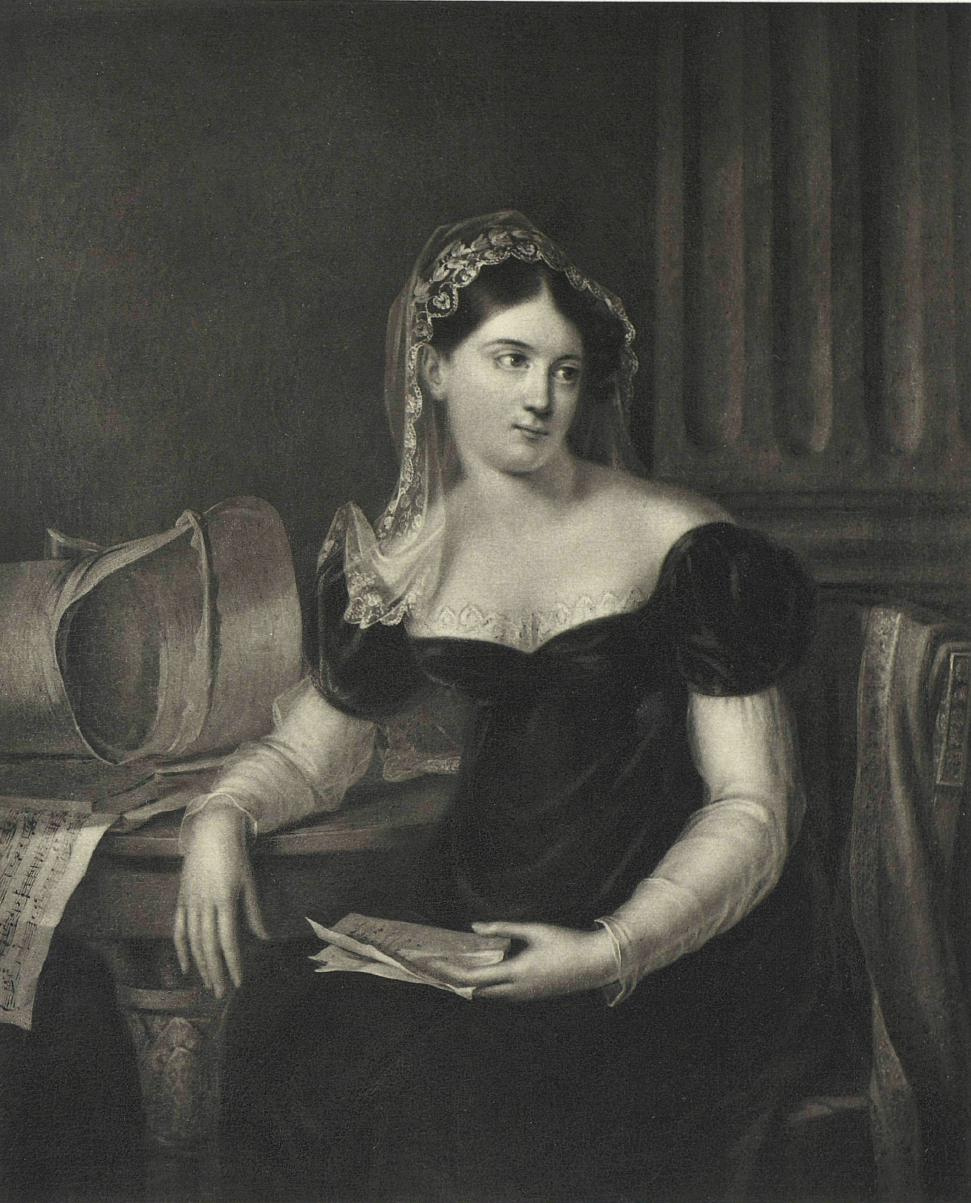
Louise Karlovna Biron Vielgorskaya, second spouse

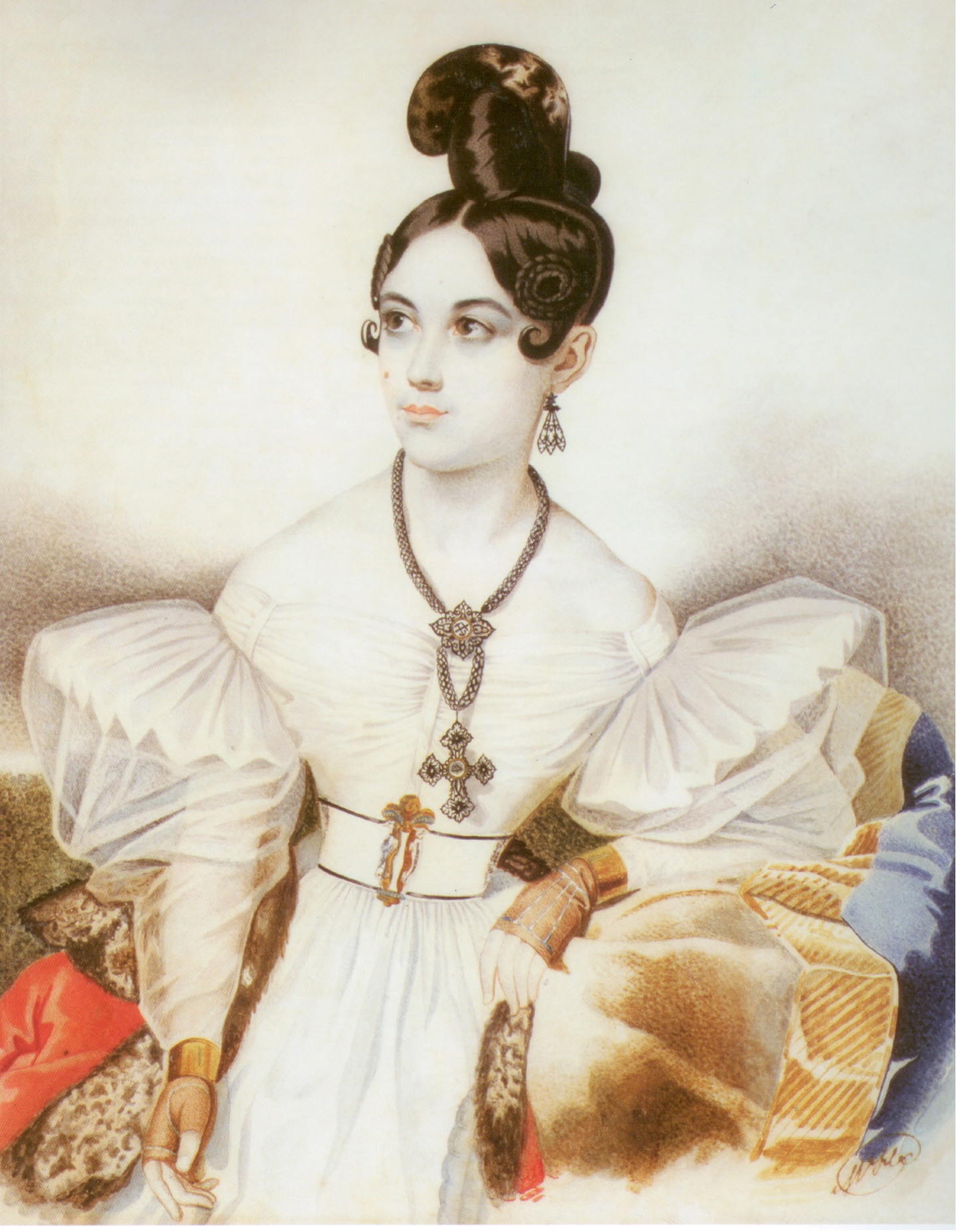
Apollinaria Mikhailovna Vielgorskaya, daughter

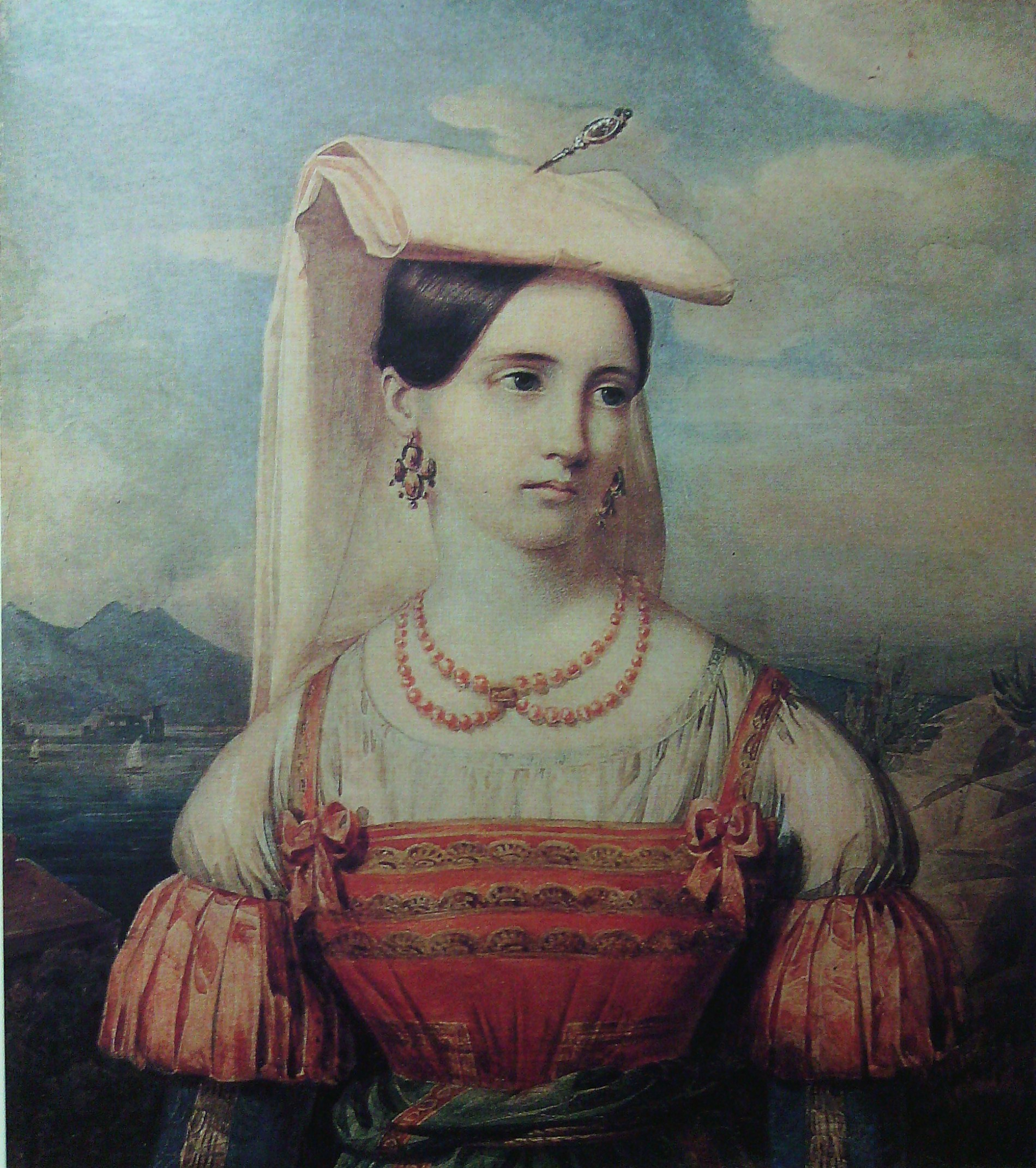
Sofia Mikhailovna Vielgorskaya, daughter

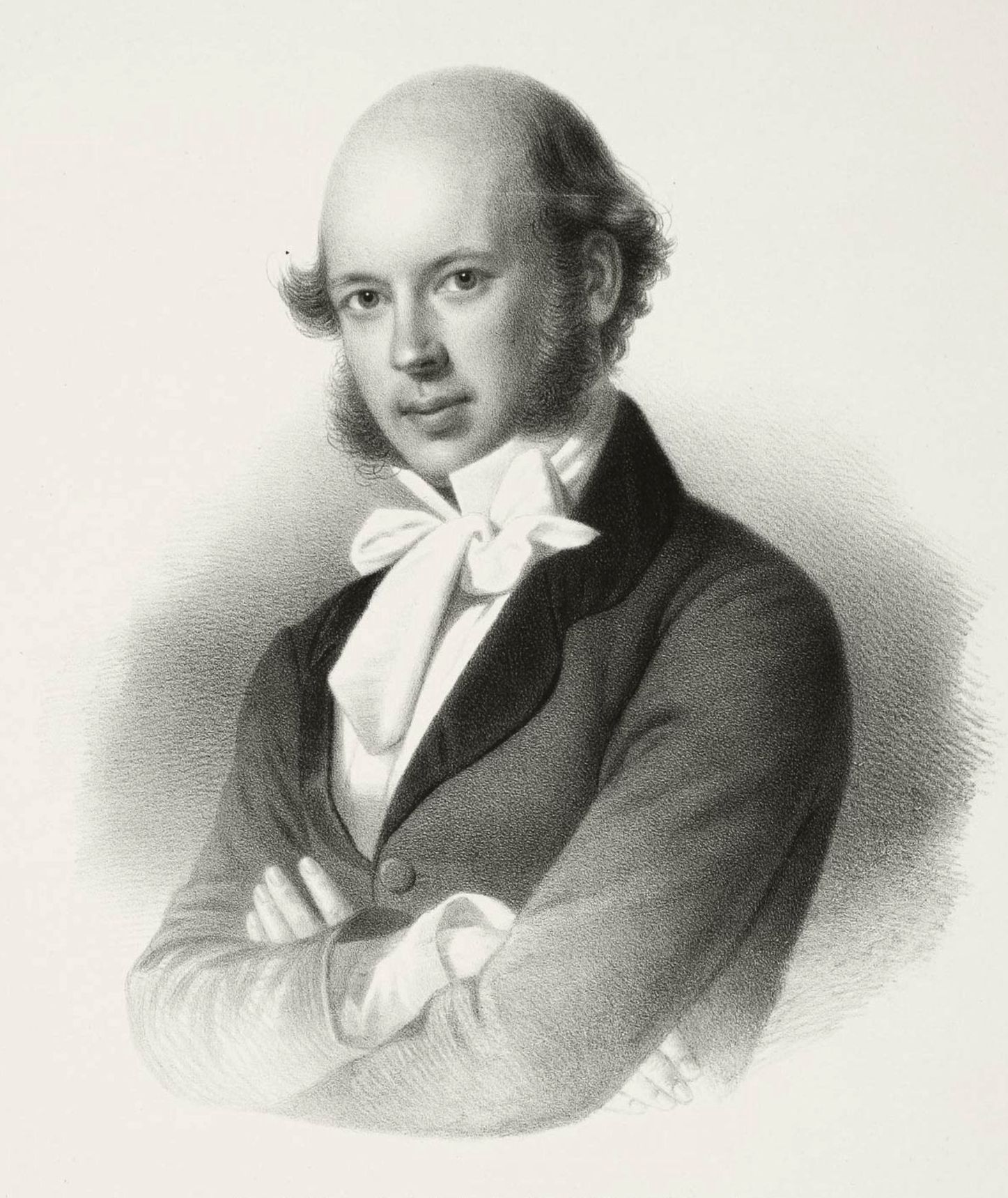
Mikhail Mikhailovich Vielgorsky, son

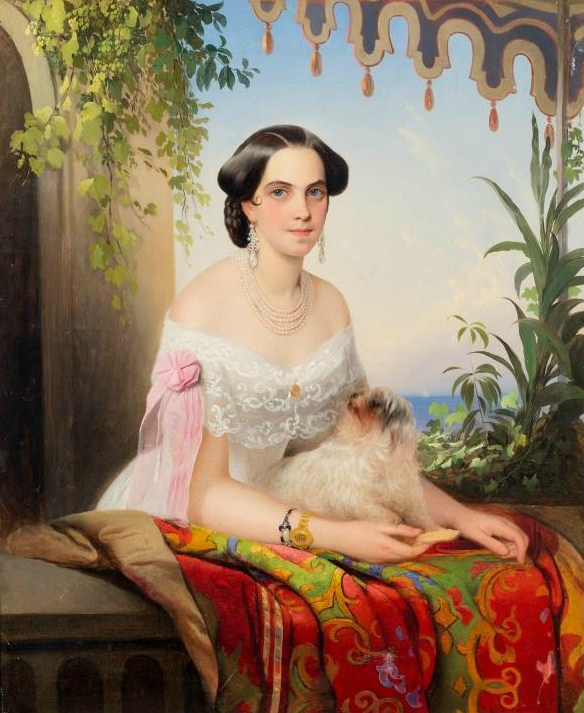
Anna Mikhailovna Vielgorskaya, daughter

Ancestry of Mikhail Yurievich Vielgorsky

16.
8. Vielgorsky, Igants
17.
4. Vielgorsky, Mikhail (1730-1794)
18.
9. Liudvika Zamoiskaya
19.
2. Vielgorsky, Yuri Mikhailovich (1753-1807)
20. Oginski, Kasimir Dominik (1660-1773)
10. Oginski, Yuzyer Yan Tadyeyush (1700-1736)
21. Voina, Eleanour(?-1738)
5. Oginskaya, Elzhbeta (1731-1771)
22. Vishnevetsky, Mikhail Servatsi (1680-1744)
11. Vishnevetskaya, Anna (1700-1732)
23. Dolskaya, Yekaterina (?-1725)
1. Vielgorsky, Mikhail Yurievich (1787/1788 - 1856)
24. Matushkin, Afanasy Ivanovich (?-1676)
12. Matushkin, Mikhail Afanasevich (1725-1800)
25.
6. Matushkin, Dmitri Mikhailovich (1725-1800)
26.
13.
27.
3. Matushkina, Sofia Dmitrievna (1755-196)
28. Gagarin, Matvei Petrovich (1696-1721)
14. Gagarin, Alexi Matyevich
29.
7. Matushkina, Anna Alekseevna (1722-1804)
30. Shafirov, Piotr Pavlovich (1669-1739)
15. Shafirova, Anna Petrovna

== Compositions ==
=== Vocal works ===
- 1885-1887: Collection of Russian Romances, for voice and piano
- Бывало, for voice and piano
- Люблю я, for voice and piano
- Два романса, for voice and piano
- «Старый муж, грозный муж, for voice and piano
- Ворон к ворону летит, for voice and piano
- Чёрная шаль, for voice and piano
- Кто три звёздах и три луне, for voice and piano

=== Opera ===
- The Gypsy

=== Symphonies ===
- Symphony No. 1 [?]
- Symphony No.2 [?]

=== Instrumental ===
- String Quartet [?]

=== Choral ===
- Canon in honor of Mikhail Glinka "Sing in ecstasy, Russian choir"

=== Orchestral works ===
- Theme and Variations, for cello and orchestra

== See also ==
- List of Russian composers
- 19th century in Russia
- Russian classical music
