= House of Durnovo =

Russian noble family

Durnovo
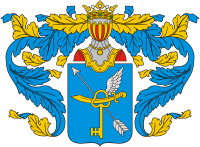
- Country: Russia
- Founded: Mid 15th century
- Founder: Vasily Yuryevich Tolstoy (Durnoy)

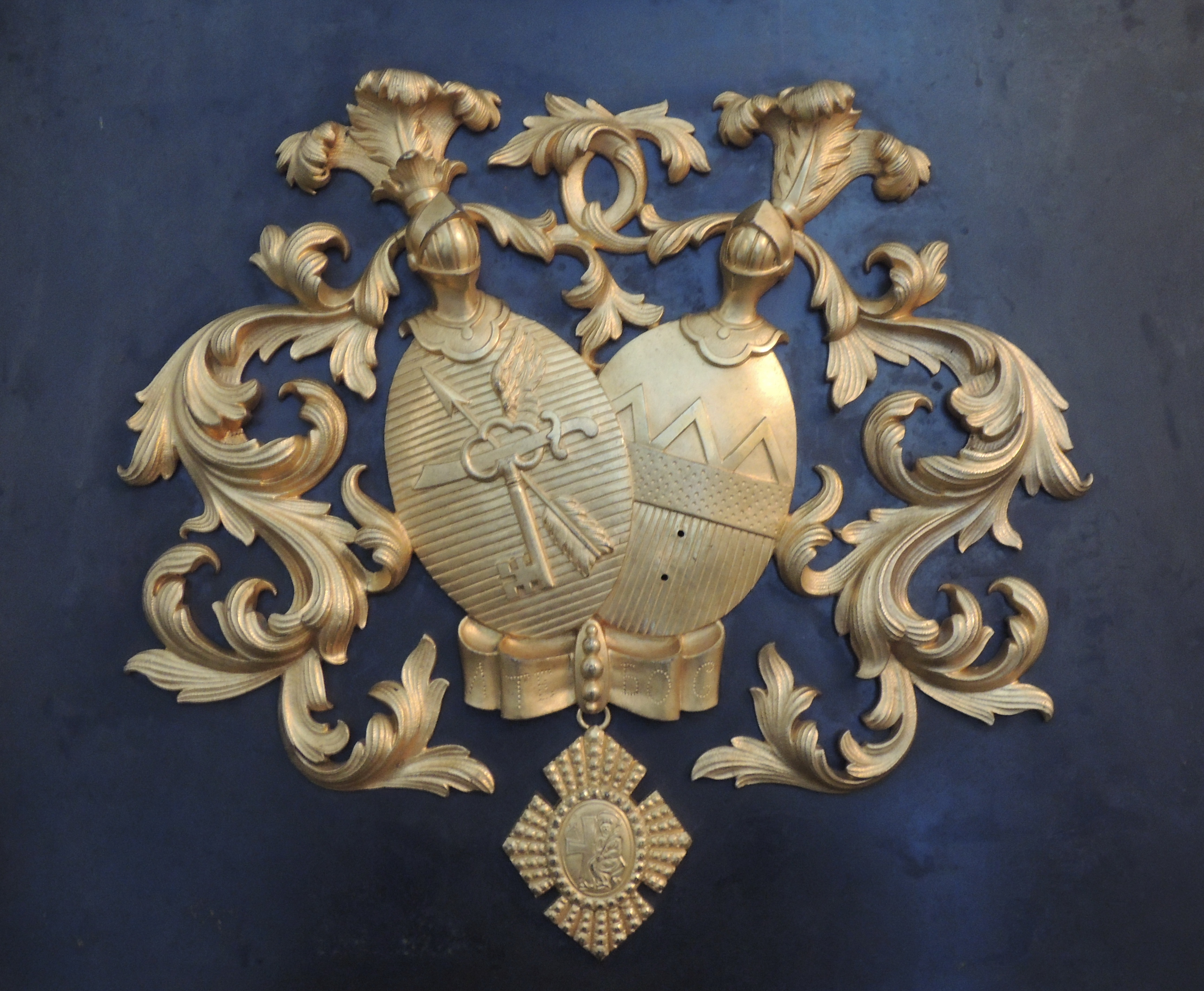
Arms of alliance of the Durnovo and Demidov families on the tomb of Maria Nikitichna Durnovo (1776–1847), Annunciation Church, Alexander Nevsky Lavra

The Durnovo (Russian: Дурново) (known variant 'Durnovy' [plural], 'Durnov'[m] ,'Durnova' [f] (Russian: 'Дурновы'; 'Дурнов', 'Дурнова')) is a prominent family of Russian nobility. Durnovo is one of two Russian noble families, of which the most famous is the branch of the Tolstoy family (Russian: Толстой).

== History ==
In the mid 15th century The Velvet Book lists founder Mikula F. Durnovo (Russian: Микула Фёдорович Дурново) grandson of Vasily Yurevich Tolstoy (Russian: Василий Юрьевич Толстой), nicknamed as Durnoy (Russian: Дурной) [Could be translated as: A Fool, Spoiled, Bad, Joker]) as a founder of the family. His brothers Daniel (Russian: Данила) and Basil (Russian: Василий) founded families of Danilov (Russian: Даниловы) and Vasilchikov (Russian: Васильчиковы). Durnovo listed in the sixth part of the Sovereign's Pedigree Book of Vologda, Kaluga, Kostroma, Moscow, Orёl, and St. Petersburg, Tambov, Tula and Tver provinces.

The family is registered in the sixth part of the Sovereign's Pedigree Book (the nobility of the Russian Empire) for several provinces, including Moscow, Saint Petersburg, Tula, and Vologda.

== Coat of arms ==
Durnovo's coat of arms is practically identical to the "parent" coat of arms of Tolstoy family.

== Notable Family Members ==
- Nikolay Dmitriyevich Durnovo (1725–1816) – General of Infantry
- Dmitry Nikolayevich Durnovo (1769–1834) – Russian politician
- Maria Nikitichna Durnovo (Demidova) (1776–1847) – wife of Dmitry Nikolaevich Durnovo
- Alexey Mikhailovich Durnovo (1792–1849) – Count, Tula Oblast
- Pavel Dmitrievich Durnovo (1804–1864) – Politician and courtier
- Ivan Nikolayevich Durnovo (1834–1903) – Politician, Prime minister of Russia (1895–1903)
- Pyotr Pavlovich Durnovo (1835–1919) – General Governor of Moscow Military District
- Pyotr Nikolayevich Durnovo (1845–1915) – Minister of Interior of Russia
- Yelizaveta Petrovna Durnovo(1855–1910) – Member of Narodniki movement
- Nikolay Nikolayevich Durnovo (1876–1937) – Linguist

== Partial Family Tree ==
Known family members in Chart Template format

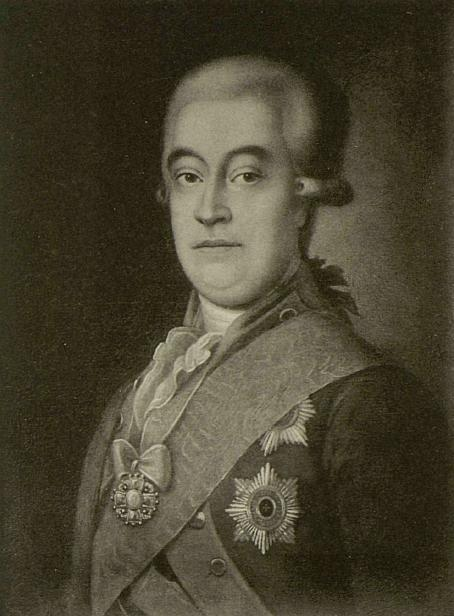
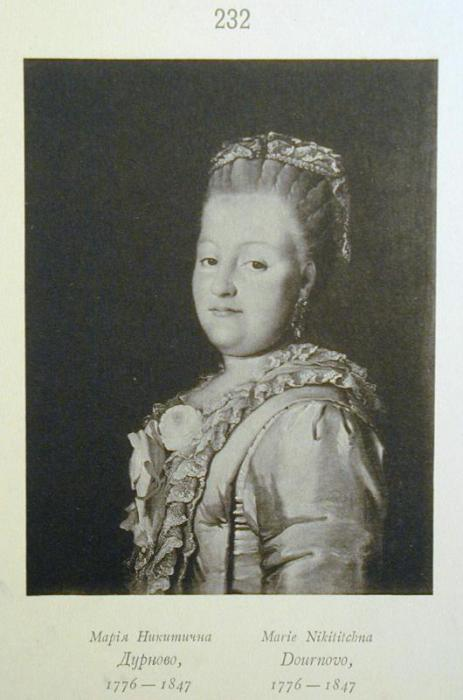
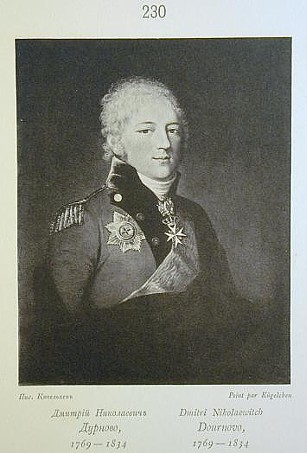
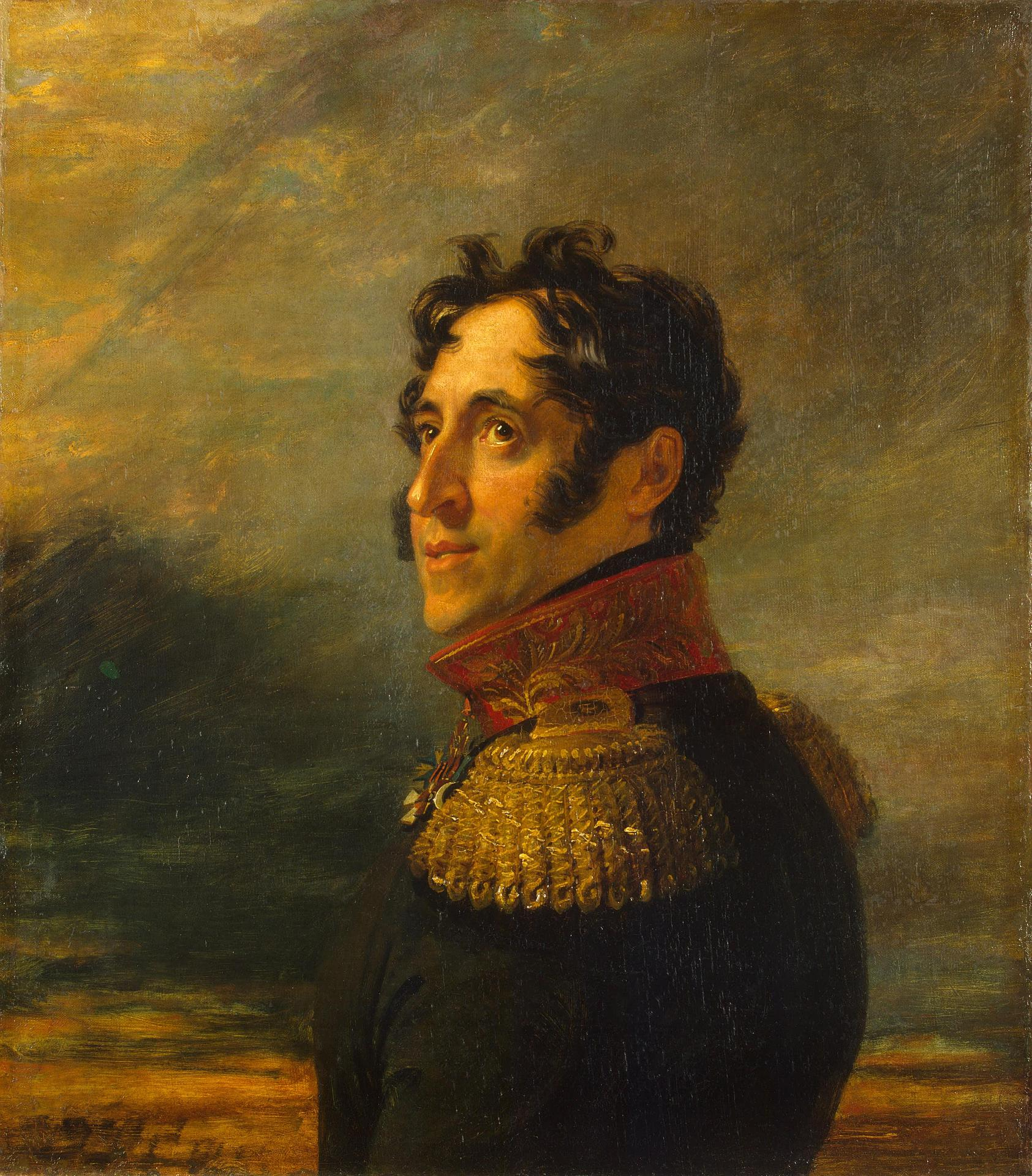
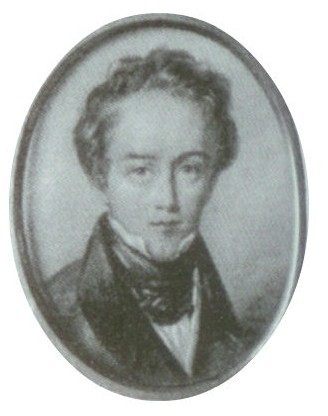
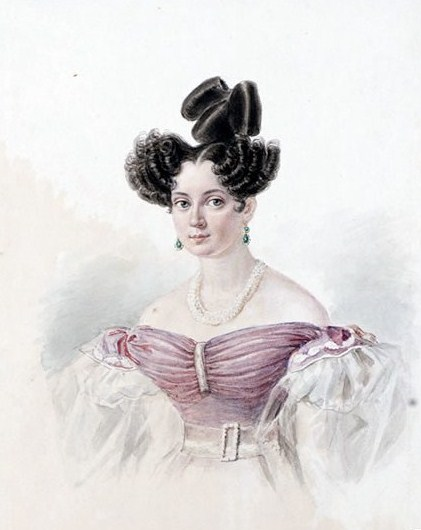
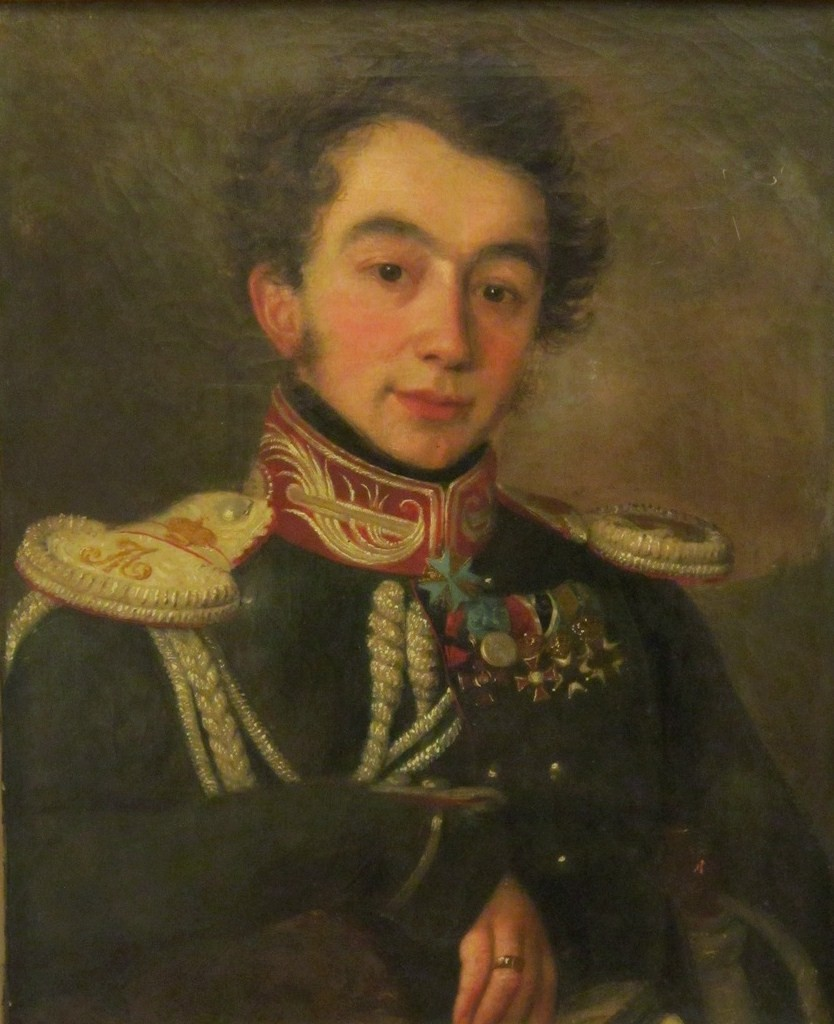
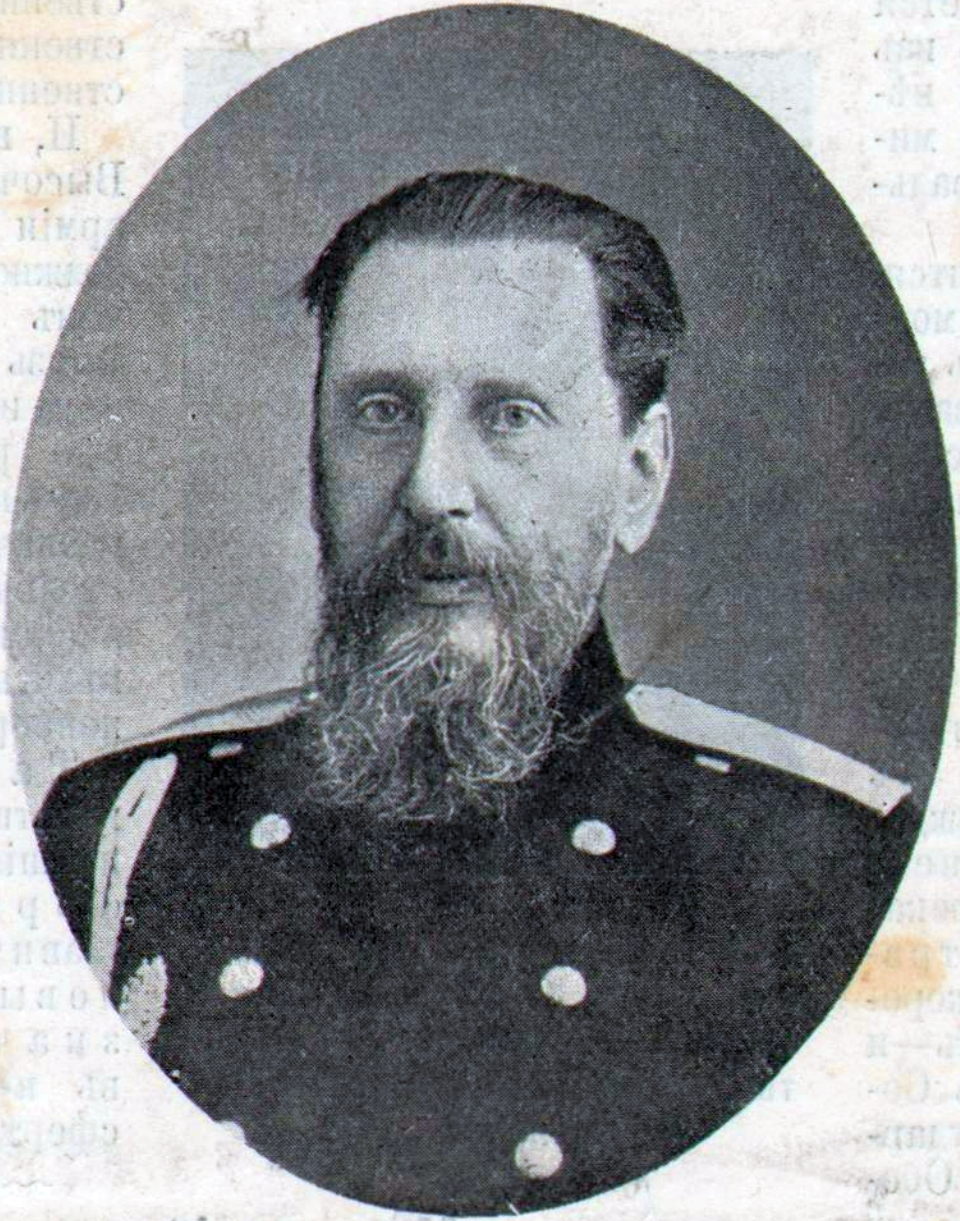
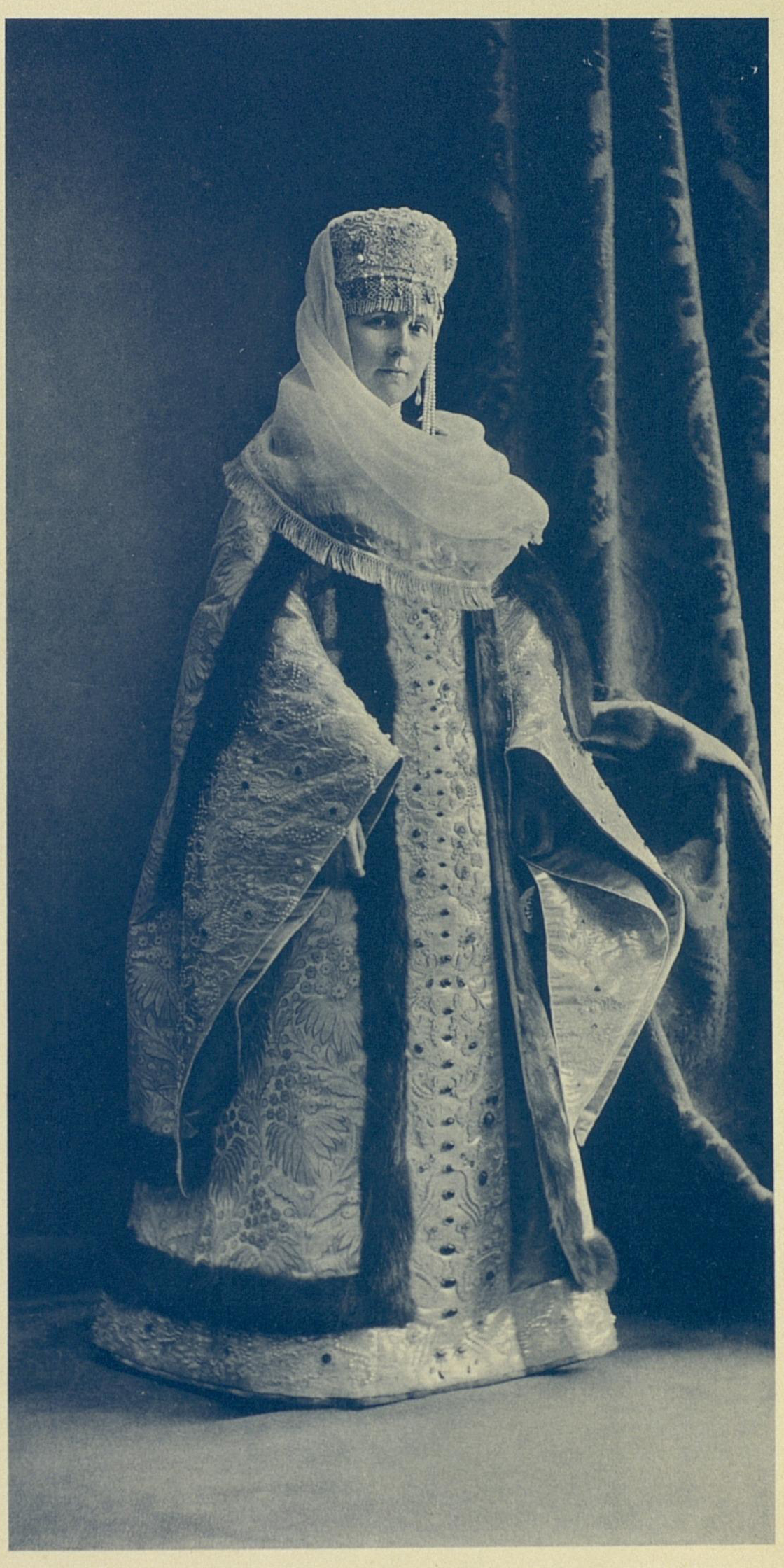
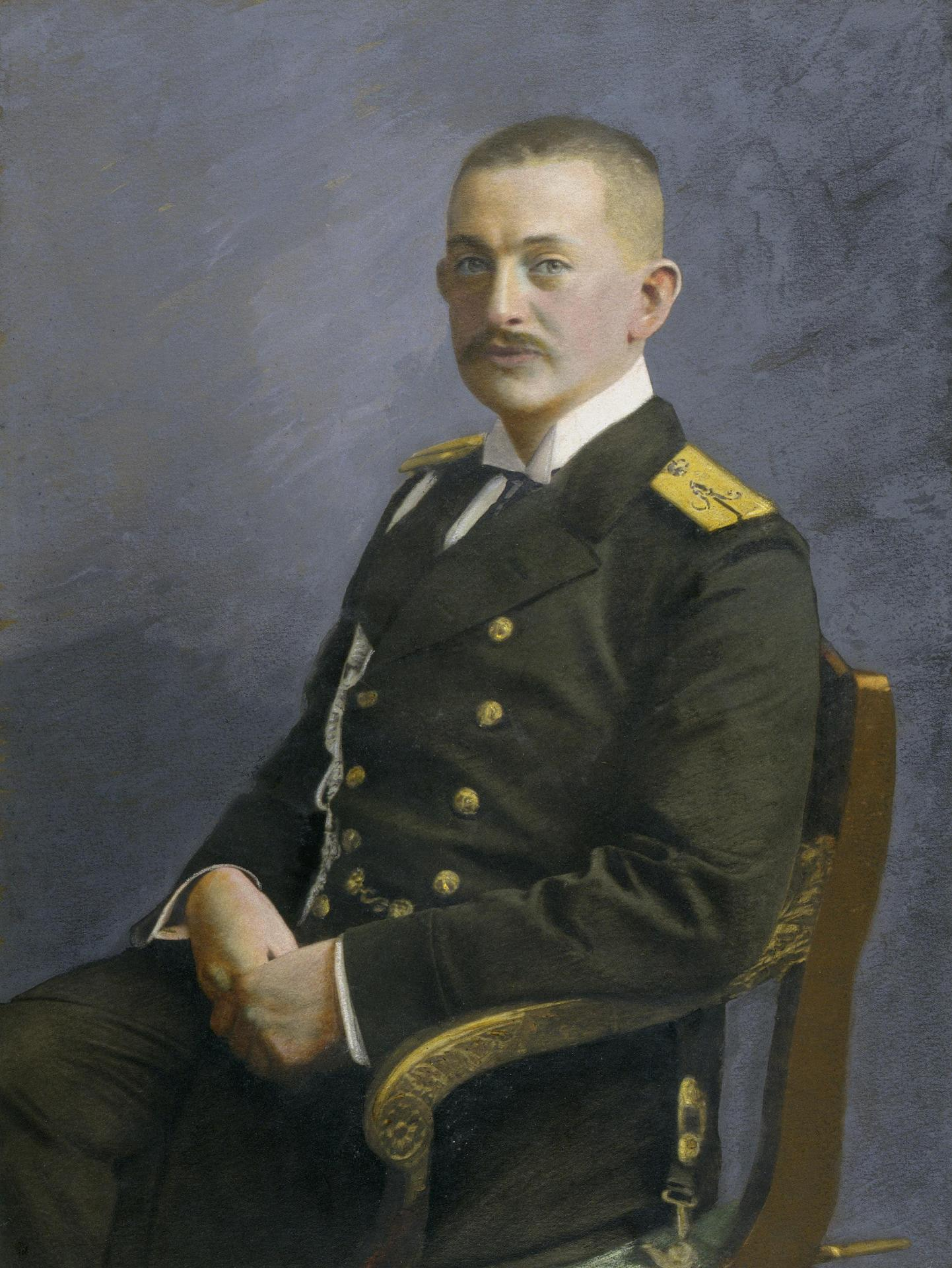
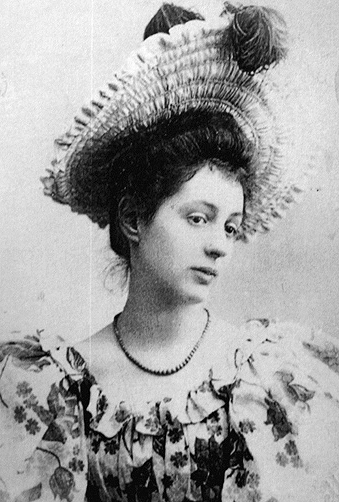
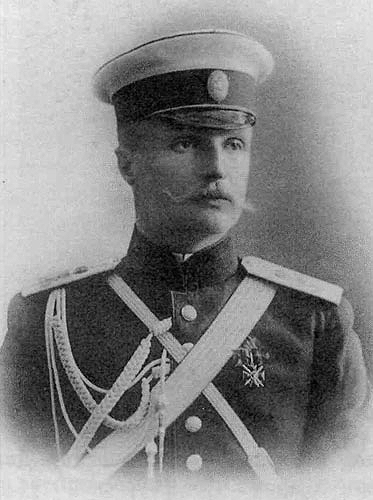
Vasiliy
Astafiy	Pavel
Danil	Stepanida Velyaminova	Jakov	Ignatiy	Ivan	Dmitry
Aleksey	Sergey	Tatiana Demidova	Nikolay
Natalia Voeykova	Mikhail	Pyotr	Ivan	Daniil	Maria Demidova	Dmitry	Ivan
Maria Griboyedova (b.1792; d.1856)	Aleksey (b.1792; d.1841)	Mikhail	Pavel	Alexandra Volkonskaya	Nikita	Sergey	Nikolay	Alexandra
Alexander	Maria Kobuchey	Pyotr	Nikolay
Alexander	Sofia	Pavel	Olexandra	Pavel Skoropadskiy

== Known Architectural Legacy and Geographical Location ==
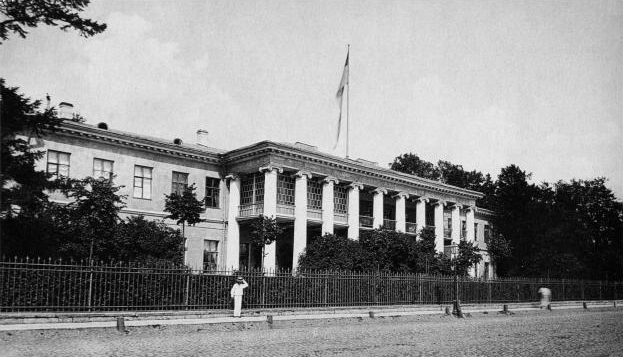
Dacha Durnovo (St. Petersburg)

- Dacha Durnovo
- Church of The Transfiguration (Village of Spasskaya-Durnovo)
- See File:Moscow, Podkolokolny 16-5, medical school.jpg (Moscow Medical College #2)
- Abashevo, Penza Oblast

== Other Family Connections ==
- Alexander Griboyedov – Maria Sergeyevna Durnovo (Griboyedova) sister of A.S. Griboyedov married to Alexey Mikhailovich Durnovo

== Sources ==
- "Дурново, дворянский род" . Brockhaus and Efron Encyclopedic Dictionary (in Russian). 1906.
