= Aleksey Durnovo =

Russian squire (1792–1841)

Aleksey Mikhailovich Durnovo (Russian: Алексей Михайлович Дурново; 1792 – after 1841) was a Russian squire and landlord in Chernsky District of Tula Oblast, Russia. The son of a landowner in the village of Spasskoe Durnovo, he attended a boarding school at Moscow University at the same time as Russian diplomat, playwright, poet, and composer Alexander Griboyedov (who enrolled as a student on December 22, 1803). He served in the military engineering corps, in the 2nd Pioneer Regiment, and retired in 1811 with the rank of lieutenant. He was a member of the militia during the war. He was well known as an amateur musician. In 1827 he married Maria Sergeyevna Durnovo (Griboyedova), the sister of Alexander Griboyedov. Later Aleksey Durnovo became an honorary trustee of the Tula Oblast Gymnasium.

Aleksey's wife, Maria Durnovo, was a sister of Russian classical writer Alexander Griboyedov. Aleksey Durnovo was good friends with him as mentioned in several correspondences, such as a letter from Durnovo's wife to her brother A. Griboyedov on May 25, 1828.

== Family ==
- Father – Mikhail Alekseevich Durnovo
- Mother – Natalia Fedorovna Voeykova
- Wife – Maria Sergeyevna Durnovo (Griboyedova) (Sister of Alexander Griboyedov)
- Son – Alexander Alekseevich Durnovo (godson of Alexander Griboyedov)

=== Family tree ===
Natalia Voeykova mother	Mikhail Durnovo father
Maria Griboyedova wife	Aleksey Durnovo self	Mikhail Durnovo brother
Alexander Durnovo son

== See also ==
- Church of the Transfiguration (Spassky)
