= Maria Sergeyevna Durnovo =

Russian musician (1792–1856)

Maria Sergeyevna Durnovo (Griboedova)
- Born: Russian: Мария Сергеевна Грибоедова; 1792; Moscow, Russia
- Died: 1856 (aged 63–64); Moscow, Russia
- Occupation: Famous amateur musician
- Years active: 1820s
- Known for: Piano and harp player; sister of Alexander Sergeyevich Griboyedov

Maria Sergeyevna Durnovo (née Griboedova) (Russian: Мария Сергеевна Дурново (Грибоедова); 1792–1856) was an amateur Russian piano and harp player. She was a younger sister of Russian writer and poet Alexander Sergeyevich Griboyedov. In 1827 she married squire and military officer Aleksey Mikhailovich Durnovo.

== Musical talent ==
Maria Sergeyevna Durnovo was a gifted pianist and harpist. According to writer Vladimir Odoyevsky, the "Griboyedovs often entertained at their house by holding music parties". On occasion, Griboyedov's house at Novinsky Square was visited by Moscow music elites such as composers Alexey Verstovsky and Alexander Alyabyev, and Alexander Vsevolozhskiy.

Alexander Griboyedov wrote about musical popularity of Durnovo in the letter from Simferopol to Stepan Begichev, dated September 9, 1825: "When I come here, I see no one; I do not know anybody and do not want to know anybody. Yet, it lasts no more than a day, thanks to my sister's reputation as a famed piano player."

== Relation to Woe from Wit ==
Maria Sergeyevna Durnovo was the first to know about the literary intentions of her brother Alexander, about his writing of the first acts of the comedy Woe from Wit (Russian: Горе от Ума). "He worked anywhere he could", recalled Durnovo. In the spring of 1823, while his comedy remained a secret to the public and to the majority of his friends, Mikhail Vielgorsky came across several sheets of a poem written by Alexander. Durnovo wanted to hide the accidentally discovered pages, but it was too late. The news of the new comedy spread around Moscow via Vielgorsky.

After the death of her brother, Durnovo and the playwright's widow Nina Alexandrovna Griboedova became the executors of Alexander Griboyedov's estate. A year later on August 31, 1832, Chernsky County Court issued a decree:

...after the death of State Councilor Alexander Sergeyevich son of Griboyedov, the remaining cash capital deposited in St. Petersburg Guardian Council, assigned to the legal heirs of the deceased: wife, Mrs. Nina Alexandrovna Griboyedova and his sister Maria Sergeyevna daughter of Griboyedov, after marriage Durnovo. Shall any book remained after the death of Mr. Griboyedov, comedy Woe from Wit, it shall belong to Mrs. Durnovo and Ms. Griboedova.
