= Dacha Durnovo =

Coordinates: 59.9602°N 30.3879°E

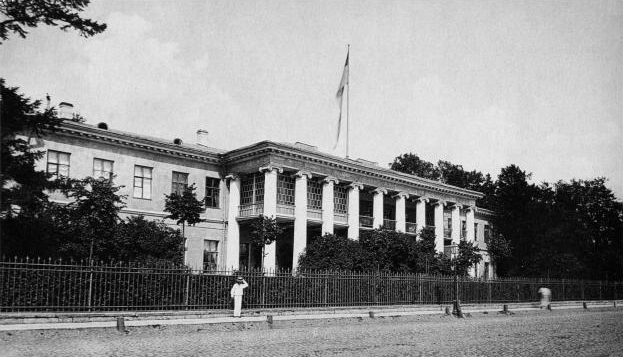
- Dacha Durnovo

General information
- Architectural style: Classicism
- Location: 22 Svedlovskaya Embarkment; St. Petersburg, Russia
- Construction started: 1780; 246 years ago

Design and construction
- Architect: Nikolay Lvov

Dacha Durnovo (Russian: Дача Дурново) is the countryside manor of Bakunin family (XVIII c.) and Durnovo family (XIX c.). It is an architectural monument of classicism, located on 22 Sverdlovsk Embankment (previously Polyustrovsky Embankment), St. Petersburg, Russia. (Russian: Свердловская Набережная, 22)

== History ==
Original country villa was built for Piotor Valilievich Bakunin in the 1780s, presumably by architect Nikolay Lvov. In 1786 the estate was passed to the Pavel Petrovich Bakunin. It was resold several more times thereafter. One of the owners was a Pavel Ivanovich Kutaisov. In 1813 it was acquired by Dmitry Nikolaevich Durnovo, who ordered its major reconstruction, presumably executed by architect Andrey Aleksevich Mikhailov. The reconstruction project lasted from 1813 to 1826. Post-reconstruction mention acquired a park/garden that became famous for its nightingales.

== Anarchist expropriation ==
In the turmoil and confusion which followed the February Revolution, groups of militant Anarchist-Communists expropriated a number of private residences in Petrograd, Moscow, and other cities. The most important case involved the villa of P. P. Durnovo, which the anarchists considered a particularly suitable target, since Durnovo had been the Governor-General of Moscow during the Revolution of 1905. Durnovo's dacha was located in the radical Vyborg (Russian: Выборг) district, Petrograd's "Faubourg St. Antoine," as John Reed dubbed it, lying on the north side of the Neva, just beyond the Finland Station. It was here that the anarchists had their staunchest following among the workers of the capital. Anarchists and other left-wing workmen seized the Durnovo villa and converted it into a "house of rest," with rooms for reading, discussion, and recreation; the garden served as a playground for their children. The new occupants included a bakers' union and a unit of people's militia.

The expropriators were left undisturbed until 5 June 1917, when a band of anarchists quartered in the dacha attempted to "requisition" the printing plant of a "bourgeois" newspaper, Russkaia Volia (Russian Liberty) (Russian: Русская Воля). After occupying the premises for a few hours, the attackers were dislodged by troops sent by the Provisional Government. The First Congress of Soviets, then in session, denounced the raiders as criminals "who call themselves anarchists." On 7 June 1917, P. N. Pereverzev, the Minister of Justice, gave the anarchists 24 hours to evacuate Durnovo's house. The following day, 50 sailors came from Kronstadt to defend the dacha, and workers in the Vyborg district left their factories and staged demonstrations against the eviction order. The Congress of Soviets responded with a proclamation calling on the workers to return to their jobs. Condemning the seizure of private dwellings "without the agreement of their owners," the proclamation demanded the liberation of Durnovo's dacha and suggested that the workers content themselves with the free use of the garden.

During the crisis, the dacha was draped in red and black flags, and armed workers came and went. Numerous meetings were held in the garden. Anarchist speakers urged that all orders and decrees, whether from the Provisional Government or the Soviet, be ignored. The anarchists remained entrenched in the dacha, in defiance of both the Provisional Government and the Petrograd Soviet. After July 1917 the anarchists left Dacha Durnovo, while some other organizations remained for some time.

== Soviet Era ownership ==
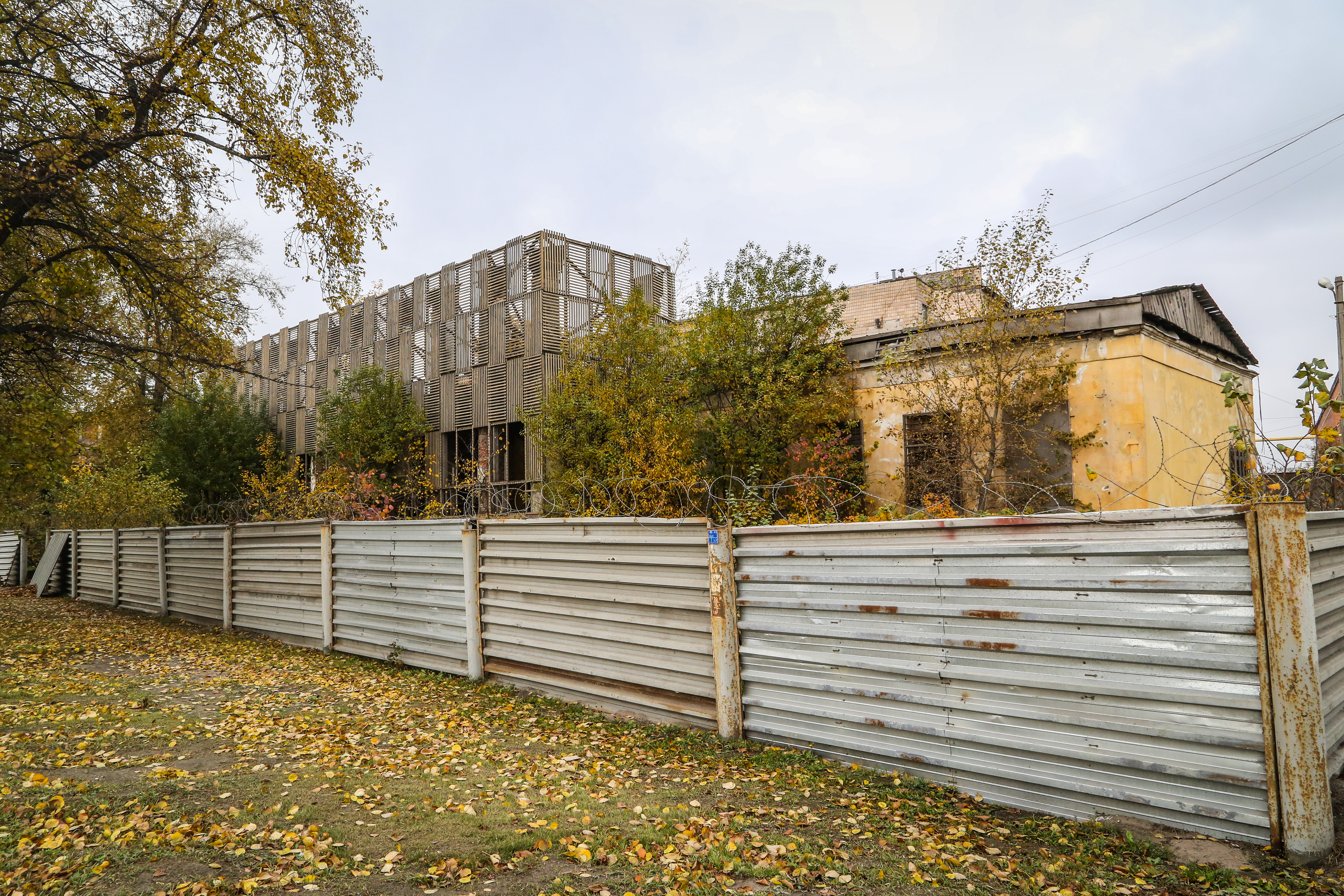
Dacha Durnovo post-Soviet condition, 12 October 2014

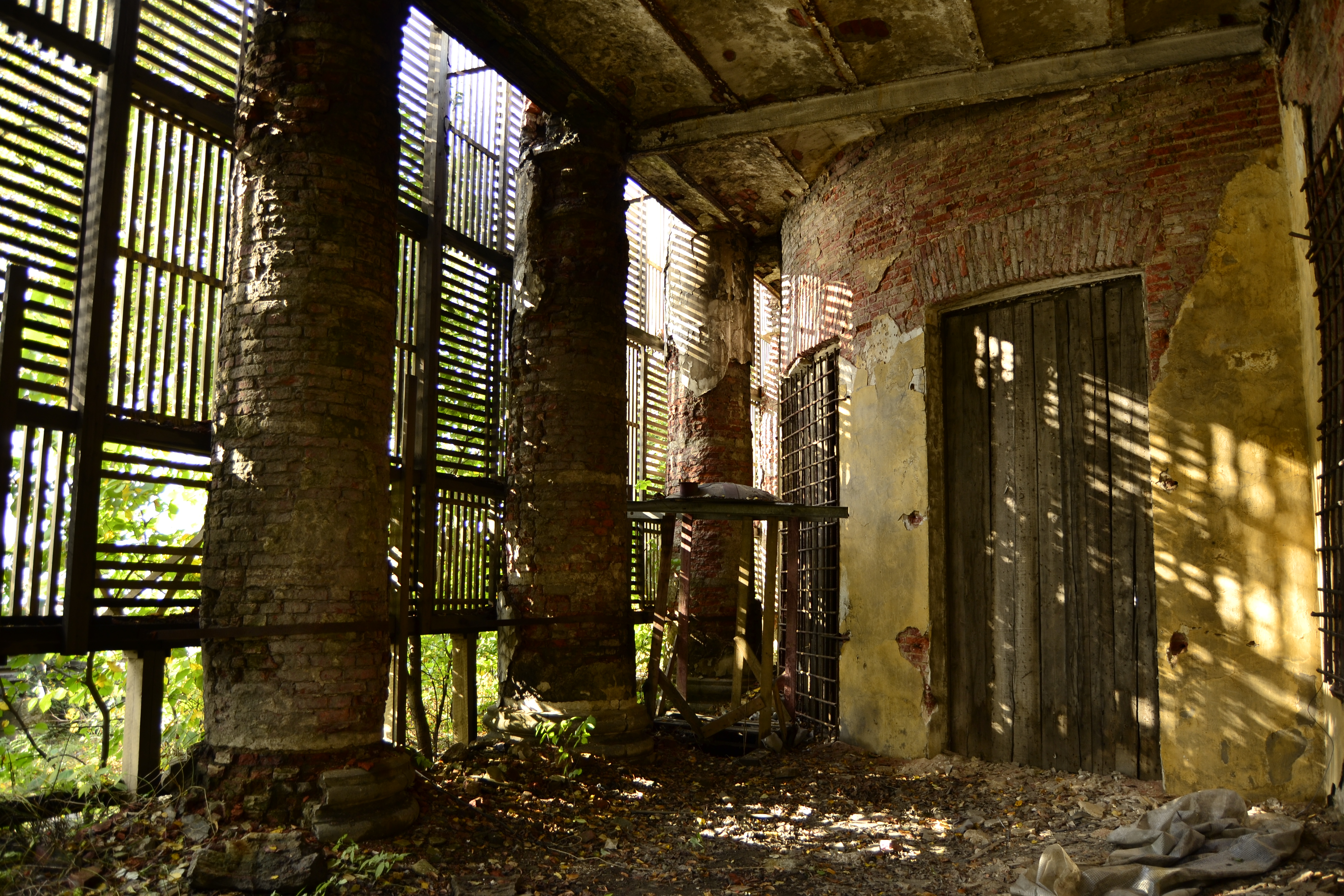
Dacha Durnovo post-Soviet condition, 12 October 2014

Leningradsky Metallichesky Zavod assumed ownership of the Dacha Durnovo and used it as worker's club.
