= Church of the Transfiguration (Spassky) =

Coordinates: 53°21′37″N 37°25′56″E

- Spassky
- Церковь Спаса Преображения (Спасское)
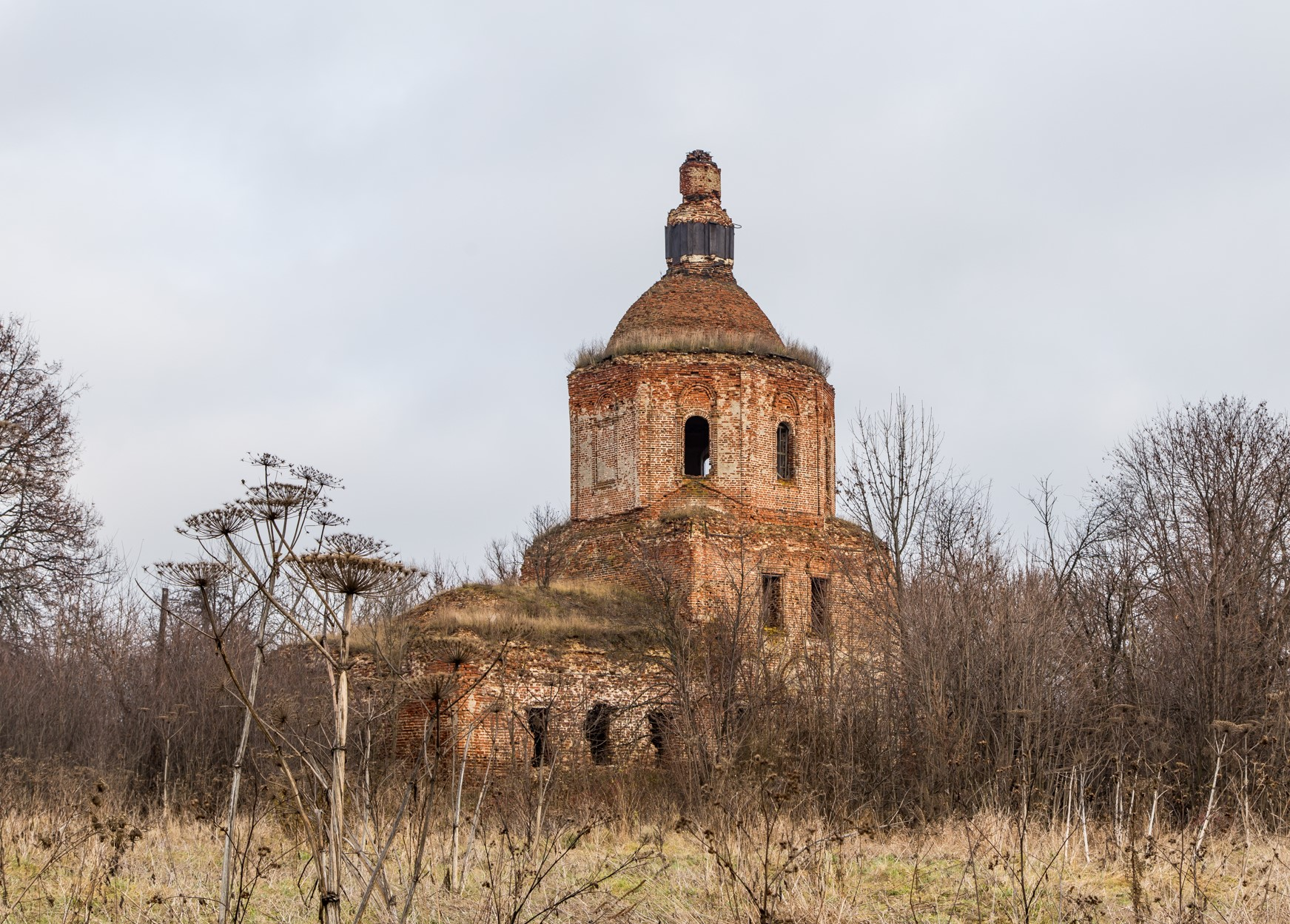
- November 18, 2017
- Church of the Transfiguration
- Location: village of Spasskoe-Durnovo, Russia

History
- Status: Invalid

Architecture
- Years built: 1972

The Church of the Transfiguration (Russian: Церковь Спаса Преображения) is a defunct/inactive Russian Orthodox church located in the village of Spasskoe-Durnovo (Russian: Спасское-Дурново) on Zusha River, Chernsky District of Tula Oblast.

== History ==
Stone temple was built in 1792 at the expense of local landowner Colonel Alexei Danilovich Durnovo. In addition to the main altar of the Transfiguration, the church has two side altars: right altar of St. Sergius of Radonezh and the left altar of the Assumption of the Blessed Virgin Mary. In 1820 old iconostasis were replaced by new ones at the expense of Lieutenant Alexander Afanasevich Krivtsov, and the landowner Alexey Mikhailovich Durnovo. The temple was not exposed to any other changes or significant alterations thereafter. After the establishment of Soviet regime, the church was closed and remains closed to this day.

== Address/location ==
Village Spasskoe, Tulskaya Oblast, Chernskiy Rayon, 301087 (Russian: 301087 Тульская обл., Чернский р-н, с. Спасское)
