= Dmitry Begichev =

Russian imperial governor (1786–1855)

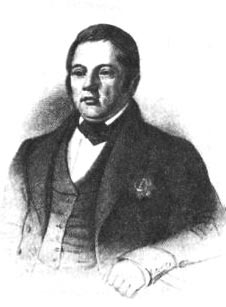
- Born: 28 September 1786; Tula Province, Russian Empire
- Died: 24 November 1855 (aged 69); Moscow, Russian Empire

Dmitry Nikitich Begichev (Russian: Дми́трий Ники́тич Бе́гичев; 28 September 1786 – 24 November 1855) was a Russian writer, governor of Voronezh Province, and senator.

== Biography ==
Begichev was born into a family of the ancient nobility. He had a successful military and civil service career. He was governor of Voronezh Province from 1830 to 1836, and in 1840 he was appointed as a senator.

He published his literary works anonymously. His five-volume novel The Kholmsky Family was published in Moscow in 1832. The language of The Kholmsky Family is fluent and often colloquial. The novel contains numerous quotes from Russian and French literature, and even quotes of "worldly wisdom" from Benjamin Franklin. The Kholmsky Family is an important antecedent of Leo Tolstoy's War and Peace. Like War and Peace it reflects the world-view of the Russian gentry.

== Family ==
- Father - Captain Nikita S. Begichev
- Mother - Alexandra Kologrivova
- Brother - Stepan Nikitich Begichev (22 July 1785 – 3 September 1859), career military
- Sister - Elizaveta Nikitichna Begicheva (Yablochkova) (1771–1843), writer, grandmother of Pavel Yablochkov inventor of Yablochkov candle electric carbon arc lamp
