= Stepan Nikitich Begichev =

Russian colonel (1785–1859)

- Степан Никитич Бегичев
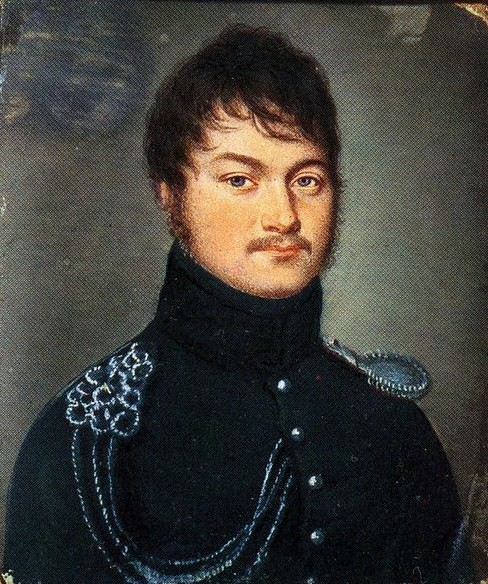
- Born: 22 July 1785; Yepifansky Uyezd, Tula Governorate, Russian Empire
- Died: 3 September 1859 (aged 74)
- Military career
- Allegiance: Russia
- Branch: Imperial Russian Army
- Service years: 1795–1825
- Rank: Colonel

Stepan Nikitich Begichev (Russian: Бегичев, Степан Никитич; 22 July 1785 – 3 September 1859) was a Russian colonel and memoirist.

== Family ==
His father was Captain Nikita S. Begichev and his mother was Alexandra Kologrivova. He had one brother, writer Dmitry Nikitich Begichev (b. 09/17/1786 - d. 11/12/1855) and one sister, Elizaveta Yablochkova (b. 1771 - d.1843). She was a writer, and grandmother of Pavel Yablochkov, inventor of the Yablochkov candle electric carbon arc lamp

He married Anna Baryshnikova on 29 April 1823. They had 6 children: Nikita (b. 1827), Nadezhda (b. 28 July 1828 – d. 1848) (Goddaughter of Alexander Griboyedov), Yekaterina (b. 1829 - d.) in a marriage Tilicheeva, Ivan (b. 1831), Dmitry (b. 1832), and Maria (b. 1833 - d. 1918).

He married Maria Lelu in 1844.

== Military career ==
- 18 November 1795—Enrolled into Page Corps
- 8 February 1802 -- Cornet of Alexandria Hussars
- 21 August 1802—Transferred into Olonetsky Musketeer Regiment as an ensign
- 21 September 1803 -- Dismissed
- 1807—Joined the Tula Police Force
- 13 January 1813—Re-enrolled as a Cornet & was appointed as an adjutant to his relative, General Alexey S Kologrivov
- 21 May 1813—Transferred to the Cavalry Regiment in the same rank of Cornet
- 1814—Promoted to the rank of Lieutenant
- 26 January 1817—Deployed to the front
- 13 March 1818—Staff-Captain
- 13 March 1819—Captain
- 9 July 1819—Colonel of Tiraspol Horse-Jaeger Regiment
- 15 September 1825—Retired as Colonel

== Friends/connections ==
While living in Moscow, his house was visited by close friends, including Prince Vladimir Odoyevsky (philosopher, writer, music critic), Denis Davydov (soldier-poet), Wilhelm Küchelbecker (Romantic poet), Alexey Verstovsky (composer) and Alexander Griboyedov (writer). In 1819 he had 175 'souls' assigned to his properties. He was a member of the Military Society (possibly saving the Union) and the Union of Welfare. He was buried in village Yekaterininskaya of Epifanskie County of Tula Oblast.
