= Sologub =

Sologub may refer to:

- Fyodor Sologub (1863–1927), Russian Symbolist poet
- Grzegorz Sołogub (1918–1986), Polish aviator
- Natalya Sologub (born 1975), Belarusian sprinter
