= Woe from Wit =

Alexander Griboyedov's comedy in verse

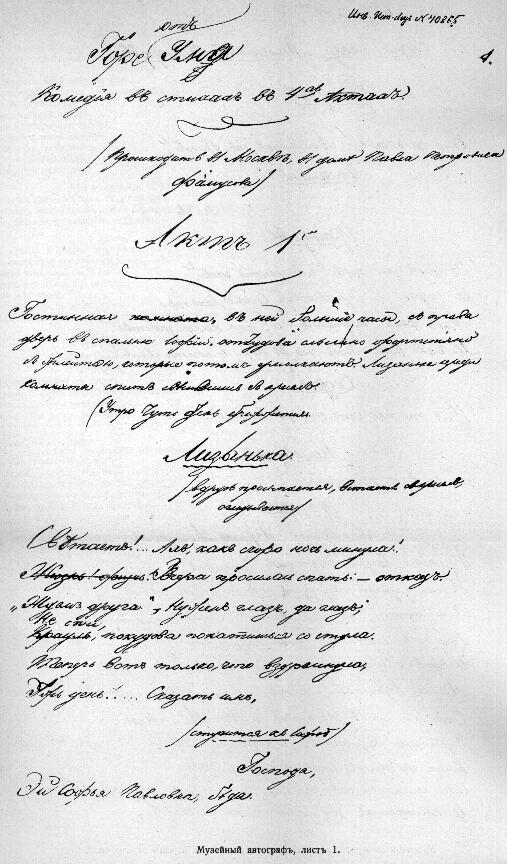
Title page of Griboyedov's manuscript

Woe from Wit (Russian: Го́ре от ума́, romanized: Gore ot uma, also translated as "The Woes of Wit", "Wit Works Woe", Wit's End, and so forth) is Alexander Griboyedov's comedy in verse, satirizing the society of post-Napoleonic Moscow, or, as a high official in the play styled it, "a pasquinade on Moscow."

The play, written in 1823 in the countryside and in Tiflis, was not passed by the censors for the stage, and only portions of it were allowed to appear in an almanac for 1825. But it was read out by the author to "all Moscow" and to "all Petersburg" and circulated in innumerable copies, so it was as good as published in 1825; it was not, however, actually published until 1833, after the author's death, with significant cuts, and was not published in full until 1861. The play was a compulsory work in Russian literature lessons in Soviet schools, and is still considered a golden classic in modern Russia and other minority Russian-speaking countries.

The play gave rise to numerous catchphrases in the Russian language, including the title itself.

== Creation ==
According to some sources, the comedy was first drafted in 1820, however to other sources, it was in 1816

During the creation of Woe from Wit Griboyedov intended it as satirical comedy of manners. As his main inspiration, Griboyedov used Molière's classical play The Misanthrope.

== Criticism ==
Throughout its nearly 200-year existence, the scholarship surrounding the play has largely been influenced by ideological interpretations. In the early years following Woe from Wit's release, it ignited discussions between conservative critics and Decembrist-Romantic authors regarding its portrayal of Moscow society. Progressive critics from the mid to late 19th century, including Vissarion Belinsky and Nikolai Dobroliubov, lauded the play as one of the initial realistic portrayals of Russian life, a tradition they believed was carried on by Pushkin and Gogol.

== Language ==
The play belongs to the classical school of comedy, with principal antecedents in Molière. Like Denis Fonvizin before him and like the founders of the Russian realistic tradition after him, Griboyedov lays far greater stress on the characters and their dialogue than on his plot. The comedy is loosely constructed but in the dialogue and in the character drawing Griboyedov is supreme and unique.

The dialogue is in rhymed verse, in iambic lines of variable length, a meter that was introduced into Russia by the fabulists as the equivalent of La Fontaine's vers libre and that had reached a high degree of perfection in the hands of Ivan Krylov. Griboyedov's dialogue is a continuous tour de force. It always attempts and achieves the impossible: the squeezing of everyday conversation into a rebellious metrical form.

Griboyedov seemed to multiply his difficulties on purpose. He was, for instance, alone of his time to use unexpected, sonorous, punning rhymes. There is just enough toughness and angularity in his verse to constantly remind the reader of the pains undergone and the difficulties triumphantly overcome by the poet. Despite the fetters of the metrical form, Griboyedov's dialogue has the natural rhythm of conversation and is more easily colloquial than any prose. It is full of wit, variety, and character, and is a veritable encyclopedia of the best spoken Russian of the period. Almost every other line of the comedy has become part of the language and proverbs from Griboyedov are as numerous as proverbs from Krylov. For epigram, repartee, terse and concise wit, Griboyedov has no rivals in Russian.

== Characters ==
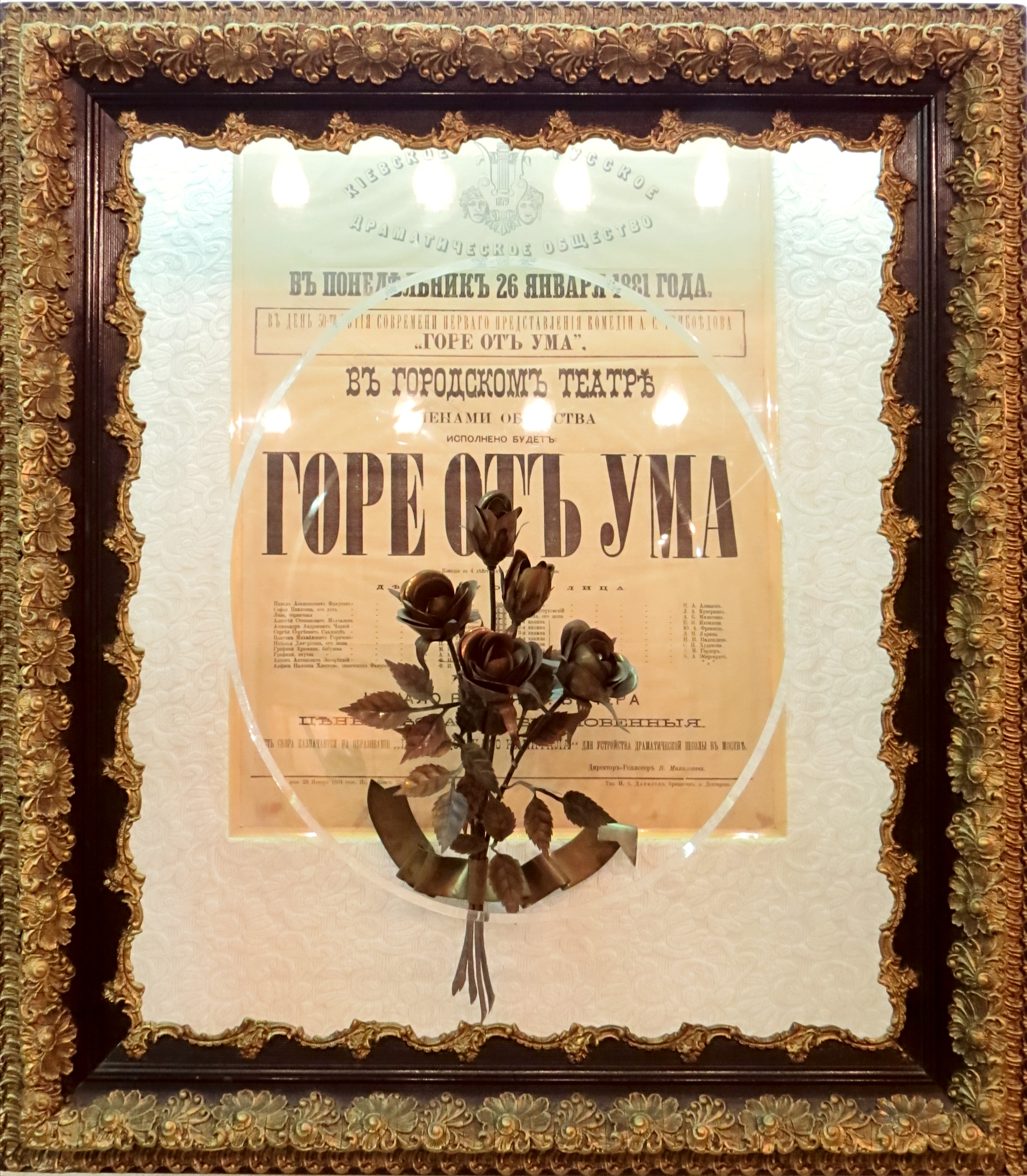
Poster from a Kiev production, 1881

Griboyedov's characters, while typical of the period, are moulded from the really common clay of humanity. They all, down to the most episodic characters, have the same perfection of finish and clearness of outline.

- Pavel Afanasyevich Famusov, the father of Sofya, the head of an important department in government, the natural conservative who puts the title and status above everything else; Therefore, Famusov is afraid of education and new waves. He is cynical and placid philosopher of good digestion, the pillar of stable society;
- Sofia Pavlovna Famusova, 17-year-old daughter of Famusov; mother died when she was little; therefore, the girl was taken care of by French tutors. Chatsky's object of love. The heroine neither idealized nor caricatured, with a strange, drily romantic flavour. She believes in love and wants to experience romance, just like in the novels she reads. With her fixity of purpose, her ready wit, and her deep, but reticent, passionateness, she is the principal active force in the play and the plot is advanced mainly by her actions.
- Lizonka, Sofia's maid, the headstrong and powerless maid. She boldly speaks her mind as she is unable to take action given her gender and station. She is a vehicle through which multiple characters expose their baser desires and reveal truths fiercely protected in public.
- Alexey Stepanovich Molchalin, Famusov's secretary living in his house, the sneak who plays whist with old ladies, pets their dogs, and acts the lover to his patron's daughter. He is a short-spoken and phony person. Looks very obedient and shy. However, Molchanin is a very calculating and coy person who knows how to get on the good side of people by flattery despite not being very intelligent. Molchanin was born into a poor family. Therefore, his goal is to climb the social ladder by marrying Sofia.
- Alexandr Andreyevich Chatsky, the protagonist. Sometimes irrelevantly eloquent, he leads a generous, if vague, revolt against the vegetable-like selfish world of Famusovs and Molchalins. His exhilarating, youthful idealism, his go, his élan is of the family of Romeo. Tradition tells that the character is modeled after Pyotr Chaadaev, an original and controversial Russian writer and philosopher, with whom Griboyedov was acquainted. It is significant that, in spite of all his apparent lack of clear-cut personality, his part is the traditional touchstone for a Russian actor. Great Chatskys are as rare and as highly valued in Russia as are great Hamlets in Britain.
- Polkovnik Sergei Sergeyevich Skalozub
- The Goriches:
  - Natalia Dmitriyevna, young lady
  - Platon Mikhailovich, her husband
- Count Tugoukhovsky
- Countess, his wife, and six daughters
- The Khryuminas:
  - Countess Khryumina, the grandmother
  - Countess Khryumina, the granddaughter
- Anton Antonovich Zagoretsky
- Old woman Khlyostova, Famusov's sister-in-law
- Mr. N.
- Mr. D.
- Repetilov, the Anglomaniac orator of the coffee room and of the club, burning for freedom and stinking of liquor, the witless admirer of wit, and the bosom friend of all his acquaintances;
- Petrushka and several speaking footmen;
- A large number of guests of all ranks and their footmen engaged during their departure;
- Famusov's waiters.

A number of the characters have names that go a long way toward describing their personality.

- Famusov's surname is derived from Latin fama, meaning "public opinion" or "repute", which is a matter of great importance to that character, while his name stands for "small" as in unremarkable and his patronymic is derived from Afanasy ("immortal").
- His daughter's given name is Sofia ("wise"), alluding to her pragmatism.
- "Chatsky", in addition to its reference to a contemporary figure, is also considered a bilingual reference, both to the English "chat" and the Russian чадить ("to emit smoke"), alluding to the inconsequential nature of Chatsky's extensive diatribes.
- Molchalin's name comes from the verb molchat', to be silent, and he is a character of few words. In the context of the character it ties up to the themes of playing a dummy by being silent server
- Tugoukhovsky's name comes from the compound word tugoukhiy, a slang equivalent of the English phrase "hard of hearing".
- Skalozub's name is an inversion of the Russian zuboskal, a mocker or jokester (literally, "one who bares teeth a lot").

== Summary of the plot ==
Act 1

The play starts with the maid of the Famusov household, Lisa, complaining about lack of sleep. Her mistress Sofya had a night rendezvous with Molchanin. Lisa had to make sure nobody would catch them. Early in the morning, she informs the mistress that it is time to say goodbye. In order to hurry up the process, Lisa changed the time on the grandfather clock and got caught by Famusov. He starts making flirty remarks to Lisa, but she excuses herself after being called by Sofya. However, the lovebirds Sofya and Molchanin still got caught when Molchanin was leaving the room. Molchanin claims he just got there to visit Sofya after his morning walk. Afterward, Famusov scolds his daughter for being alone with a young man.

Lisa warned Sofya about possible rumors, but she did not care. Lisa assumes that Molchanin and Sofya's relationship will not last anyway since Molchanin is from a poor family. Instead, Famusov wants to marry his daughter to Skalozub, who is not only rich but also has titles. Sofya rejects that idea because she refuses to marry someone as stupid.

As they were discussing intelligence and foolishness, they remembered Sofyas first love - Alexandr Chatsky, who was a very bright young man, but he unexpectedly left the manor 3 years ago. Sofya disregards Chatsky as her first love and labels their relationship as childhood friends.

At that moment, another servant informs that Chatsky is back.

Chatsky, in spite of all societal norms, goes straight to Sofya, whom he still loves, but is surprised at her cold welcome. He starts reminiscing about their past, but Sofya calls it childishness. Chatsky questions whether Sofya is in love with someone, considering she looks flustered. Sofya brushes the question off.

Later, Chatsky meets Famusov; in their conversation, Chatsky keeps complimenting Sofya in front of her father. Meanwhile, Famusov hopes Chatsky has no intentions of courting Sofya.

After Chatsky left, Famusov kept thinking about who was more suitable for his daughter.

Act 2

Chatsky asks Famusov what his reaction would be if Chatsky started courting Sofya. Famusov replies that earning titles would be great. To which Chatsky says one of his famous lines, "The service? Good! Servility? Disgusting!" " (In the original, Chatsky says that he would love to serve the country but finds the idea of buttering up the higher-ups sickening). This results in back and forth between two men. Famusov calls Chatsky too prideful and brings his uncle, who served in court and was wealthy, only because he knew how to slavish. Chatsky, in response, starts his monologue "Who" are the judges," in which he compares the generations and criticizes the Famusov generation for being so prejudiced and caring only for wealth and money. Instead of serving high-ranked names, Chatsky wants to serve the cause.

Colonel Skalozubov arrives, and Famusov warns Chatsky not to speak freely. Skalozubov and Famusov start judging the colonel's cousin, who left for the village despite having a high rank. The conversation shifts to marriage, and when Famusov wonders if Skalozubov considers marriage, Chatsky joins the conversation. They have another back and forth about their ideals.

Shortly after, Sofya runs up, scared and fainting because Molchanin fell off the horse. However, Chatsky sees through the window that Molchanin is fine. After Sofya wakes up and hears from Chatsky that Molchanin is fine, she accuses him of indifference/cold-heartedness. Chatsky finally realizes that Sofya loves Molchanin. Meanwhile, Molchanin accuses Sofya of being too obvious about her feelings. But she does not care. Liza suggests flirting with Chatsky to divert the suspicion.

However, when alone with Liza, Molchanin keeps flirting with the maid.

Act 3

Chatsky questions Sofya, who is the man of her heart: Molchanin or Skalozub. She, in return, avoids the question. Chatsky says he is "going senseless" because of his love for her (in the original, it is a world play to the title "woe from mind", Chatsky "losing his mind because of love").

All the important people from Moscow come over for a ball in the evening. Molchanin tries his best to brown nose Sofyas aunt, which was noticed by Chatsky. He made fun of Molchanin's servility.

Meanwhile, Sofya discusses Chatsky's pridefulness with Sir. N and mentions that Chatsky seems to be out of his mind. That causes a wildfire-like rumor amongst the guests. Everyone starts avoiding Chatsky because of his "craziness," and even Famusov admits that Chatsky has some sparks of craziness.

Chatsky says that his soul is full of woe, and he is not comfortable amongst these people. He is dissatisfied with the current state of Moscow. He is scandalized by the guest from France who was afraid that in Russia, he would encounter barbarians, but instead, he was welcomed without hearing any Russian speech or seeing Russian faces. Chatsky is repulsed by the fact that everyone bows down to France and tries to imitate it. While Chatsky was finishing his speech, the audience left him.

Act 4

The ball finished. The guest are going home. Chatsky's dreams and hopes are tarnished. He is contemplating who has spread the rumor and if Sofya is aware of those rumors. When Chatsky sees her he hides and accidentally hears the conversation between Liza and Molchanin. During which Molchanin confesses that he is not planning to marry Sofya and he only pleases her because of who her father is. However Molchanin is rather fond of the maid Liza. Sofya also becomes an accidental witness of the conversation and upon noticing her Molchanin kneels down and begs for forgiveness. Sofya though rejects him and orders to leave the mansion by morning.

Chatsky leaves his hiding spot and reproaches Sofya's affair with Molchanin. Sofya in her defense states that she could not fathom Molchanin would turn out to be like that.

Famusov is surprised to see them together since Sofya just called Chatsky "madman". That is when Chatsky figures out that Sofya is the one who spread the rumor. Famusov meanwhile scold the servants because they failed to look after his daughter. Liza was sent to farm. Sofya was threatened to be sent to a village.

After which Chatsky has his final monologue about how his hopes fell. He blames Sofya for giving him false hope that they could be something more than just childhood lovers. But he does not regret their break up as he is not suited for Famusov’s society. Chatsky decides to leave Moscow for good. But the only thing that bothers Famusov is what would the Duchess say.

The end.

== Mentions elsewhere ==
From Anton Chekhov's A Dreary Story from the notebook of an old man

'If no progress can be seen in trifles, I should look for it in vain in what is more important. When an actor wrapped from head to foot in stage traditions and conventions tries to recite a simple ordinary speech, "To be or not to be," not simply, but invariably with the accompaniment of hissing and convulsive movements all over his body, or when he tries to convince me at all costs that Tchatsky, who talks so much with fools and is so fond of folly, is a very clever man, and that "Woe from Wit" is not a dull play, the stage gives me the same feeling of conventionality which bored me so much forty years ago when I was regaled with the classical howling and beating on the breast.'

From Mikhail Bulgakov's The Master and Margarita Chapter 5.

== See also ==
- Maria Sergeyevna Durnovo (Griboyedova)
- Vsevolod Meyerhold State Theatre
