= Pyotr Pavlovich Durnovo =

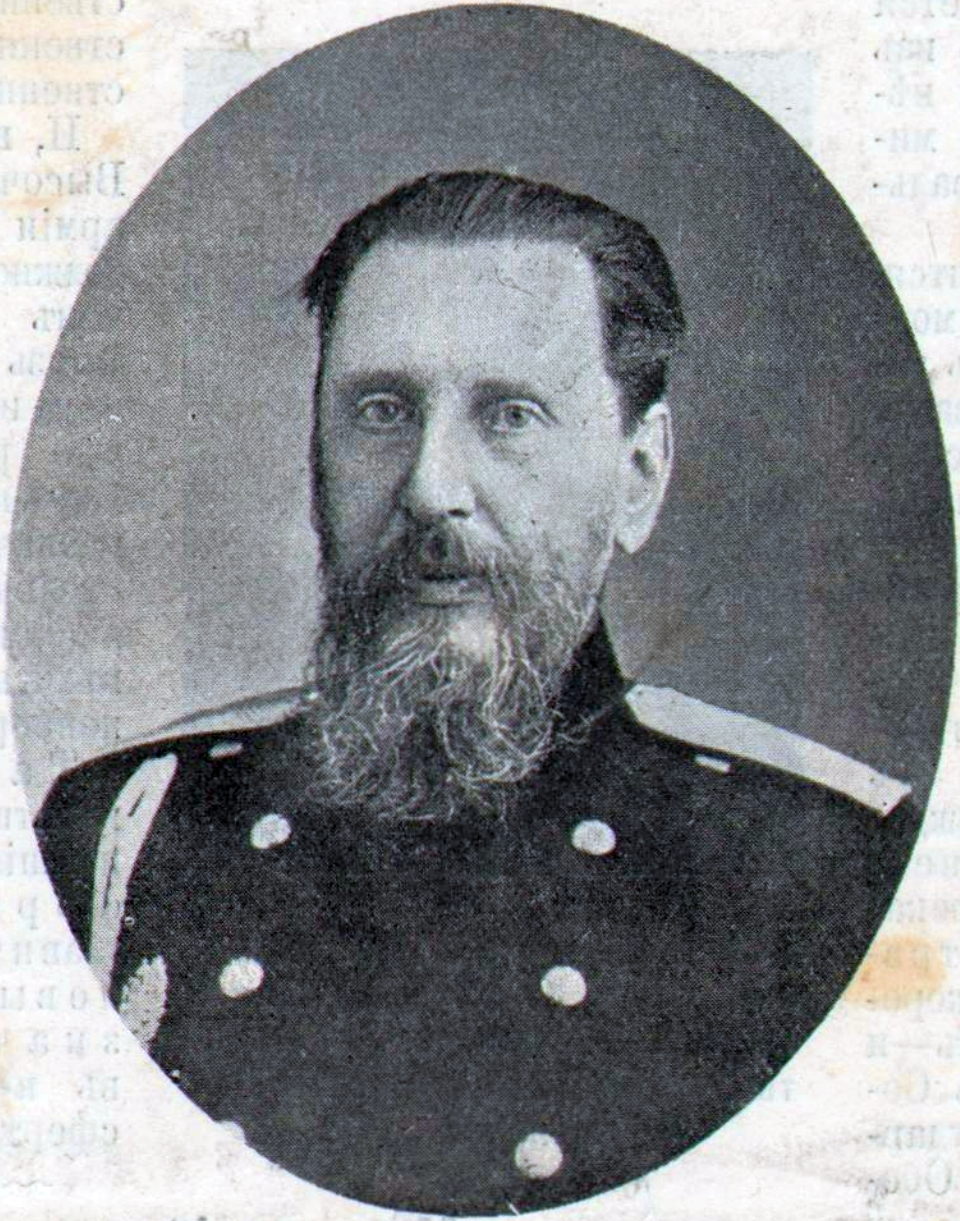
- Pyotr Pavlovich Durnovo

Moscow's Governor
- In office 16 December 1872 – 14 September 1878

Moscow's Governor-General
- In office 15 July 1905 – 24 November 1905

Pyotr Pavlovich Durnovo was Moscow's Governor General during the 1905 Russian Revolution. His dacha became the site of an anarchist occupation in 1917. From 1881 to July 1917 he was the vowel of the Saint Petersburg City Duma (chairman from 1904). In the provincial zemstvo meeting, he was elected a member of the City Council, chairman of the Permanent Financial Commission of the City Council of St. Petersburg.

Durnovo lived in a family mansion on 16 Angliyskaya Embankment, owned the Durnovo Dacha on Polyustrovskaya Embankment, as well as apartment buildings adjacent to it (No. 13-15).

From July to November 1905 he was Moscow General-Governor. He was never a "Commander (of the Troops) of the Moscow Military District". Nikolai Nikolayevich Malakhov was the Commander of the Troops of the Moscow Military District in that time from February 1905 to January 1906.
