= Alexander Griboyedov =

Russian diplomat, playwright, poet and composer (1795-1829)

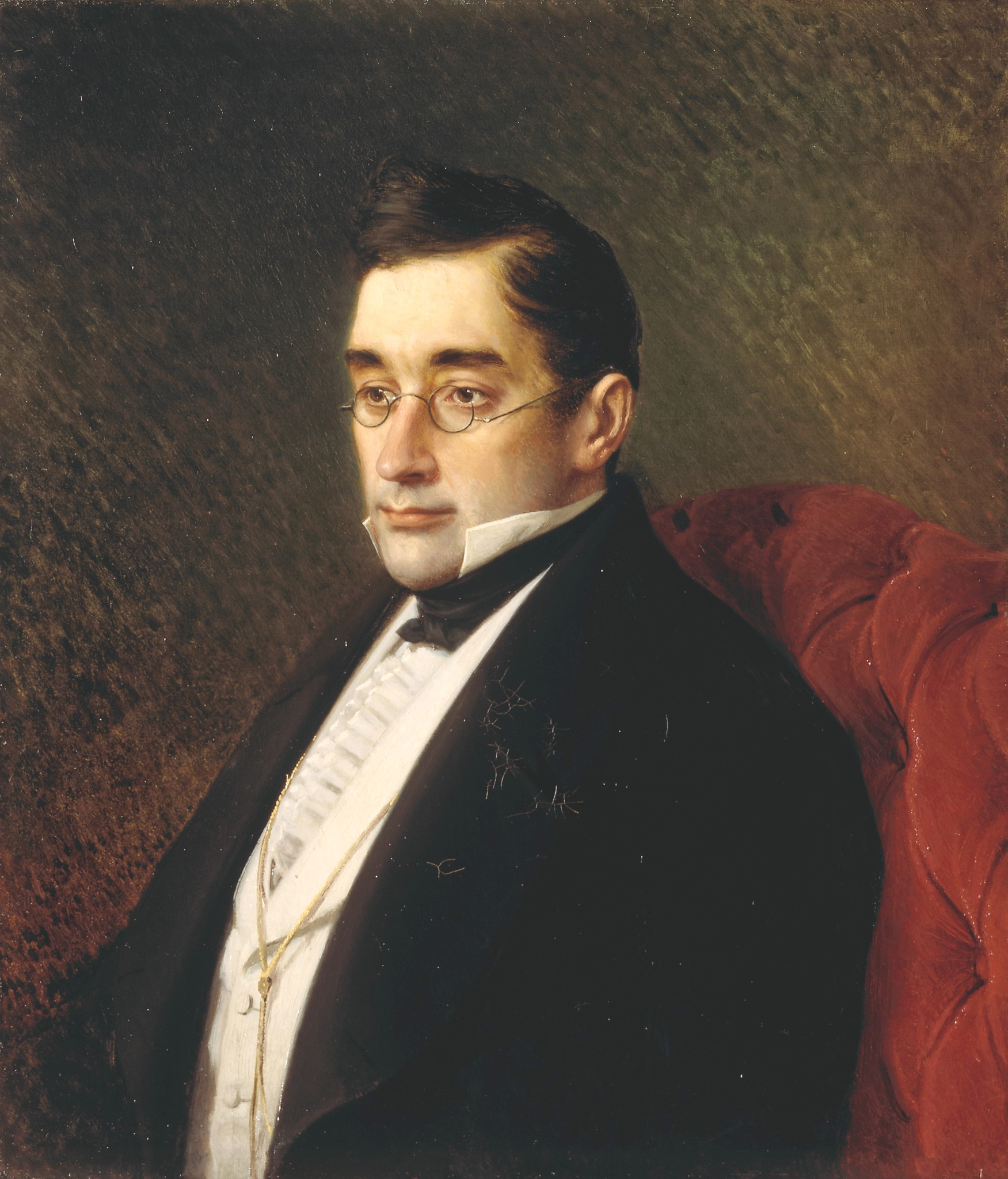
- Posthumous portrait (1873) by Ivan Kramskoi

Russian Ambassador to Iran
- In office 1828–1829
- Monarch: Nicholas I of Russia

Personal details
- Born: Alexander Sergeyevich Griboyedov; 4 January 1795 Moscow, Russian Empire
- Died: 11 February 1829 (aged 34) Tehran, Qajar Iran
- Resting place: Tbilisi, Georgia
- Spouse: Nino Chavchavadze
- Education: Imperial Moscow University (1808)
- Occupation: Diplomat, playwright, poet, and composer

Alexander Sergeyevich Griboyedov (Russian: Александр Сергеевич Грибоедов, romanized: Aleksandr Sergeevich Griboedov; 15 January 1795 – 11 February 1829) (Note: Historically also romanized as Alexander Sergueevich Griboyedoff.) was a Russian diplomat, playwright, poet, and composer. His one notable work is the 1823 verse comedy Woe from Wit. He was Russia's ambassador to Qajar Persia, where he and all the embassy staff were massacred by an angry mob in the aftermath of the ratification of the Treaty of Turkmenchay (1828), which confirmed the cession to Russia of Persia's northern territories comprising Transcaucasia and parts of the North Caucasus. Griboyedov played a pivotal role in the ratification of the treaty. The immediate cause for the incident was Griboyedov giving refuge to Armenians who had escaped from the harems of the Persian shah and his son.

== Early life ==
Griboyedov was born in Moscow, the exact year unknown, with biographers debating whether it was in 1790 or 1795. His mother who dreamed of providing him with a career made sure Griboyedov received the best education.

He received a master's degree in philology from Moscow University, and subsequently enrolled in the doctorate program. Griboyedov was fluent in all major European languages such as French, English, German, Italian, Greek, Latin, and mastered oriental languages like Arabic, Persian and Turkish. According to Pushkin Griboyedov was one of the smartest people in Russia at the time.

In 1812, he quit the program and enrolled in the military. He obtained a commission in a hussar regiment, which he resigned in 1816. The next year, he entered the civil service. In 1818, he was appointed secretary of the Russian legation in Persia, and transferred to Georgia.

He possessed musical talent, played the piano and composed several waltzes. Only two of his waltzes survive to the present day, although it is recorded that he composed several, including vaudevilles in association with stage plays. He is best known for his literary compositions and poetic verses.

His verse comedy The Young Spouses (Russian: Молодые супруги, Molodye Suprugi), loosely based on a French play by Auguste Creuzé de Lesser, which Griboyedov staged in Saint Petersburg in 1816, was followed by other similar works, mostly either translated or co-authored with more experienced writers of the day. Neither these nor his essays and poetry would have been long remembered but for the success of his verse comedy Woe from Wit (Russian: Горе от ума, Gore ot uma), a satire on Russian aristocratic society.

As a high official in the play puts it, this work is "a pasquinade on Moscow". The play depicts certain social and official stereotypes in the characters of Famusov, who hates reform; his secretary, Molchalin, who fawns over officials; and the aristocratic young liberal and Anglomaniac, Repetilov. By contrast the hero of the piece, Chatsky, an ironic satirist just returned from western Europe, exposes and ridicules the weaknesses of the rest. His words echo the outcry of the young generation in the lead-up to the Decembrist revolt of 1825.

In Russia for the summer of 1823, Griboyedov completed the play and took it to Saint Petersburg. It was rejected by the censors. Many copies were made and privately circulated, but Griboyedov never saw it published. After his death the manuscript was jointly owned by his wife Nina Alexandrovna Griboyedova and his sister Maria Sergeyevna Durnovo (Griboyedova). The first edition was not published until 1833, four years after his death. Only once did he see it on the stage, when it was performed by the officers of the garrison at Yerevan. Soured by disappointment, he returned to Georgia. During the Russo-Persian War of 1826–1828, he put his linguistic expertise at the service of general Ivan Paskevich, a relative. After this, he was sent to Saint Petersburg where he worked on the Treaty of Turkmenchay negotiations. There, thinking to devote himself to literature, he started work on a romantic drama, A Georgian Night (Russian: Грузинская ночь, Gruzinskaya noch), based on Georgian legends.

== Musical life ==
Alexander Griboyedov's education was not only extensive, continuing into doctoral work before shifting to military training, but had included musical study as well. Although producing only a small number of works during his lifetime, he was well experienced in an array of instruments including piano, organ, and flute. During his musical study, it is recorded that he studied with the Irish pianist, composer, and ostensible "creator" of the nocturne form John Field, along with Johann Heinrich Müller in the field of music theory.

Grioboyedov was regarded as a "very good musician" by the likes of Mikhail Glinka, and had routine salons at his residence which were attended by many musical luminaries of his time, although relatively minor in the contemporary decade, including Vladimir Odoevsky, Alexander Alyabyev, Mikhail Vielgorsky, and Alexey Verstovsky.

Out of work as a composer, only two compositions survive to the present, those being his two waltzes in A-flat major and E minor. He is known to have composed the musical score to the opera-vaudeville (or operetta) called "Who is a Brother, Who is a Sister, or Deception for Deception" (1824), written by the composer himself in collaboration with Pyotr Vyazemsky.

== Death ==
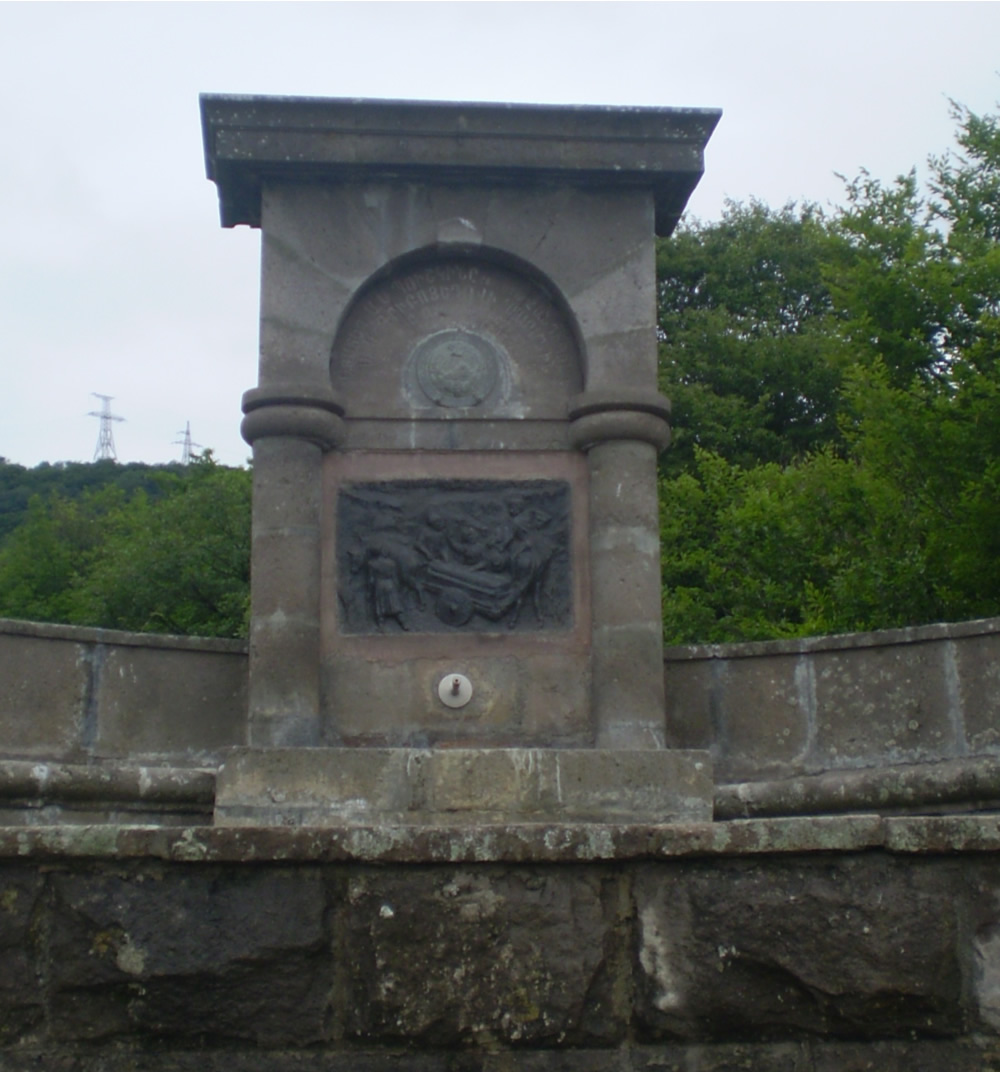
Monument erected in Soviet times near Gargar village, Armenia commemorating the location where Alexander Pushkin (on his way to meet his brother) stopped the carriage with Alexander Griboyedov's body being transported to Tiflis. An inscription in Russian and Armenian says: "Here A. S. Pushkin saw the body of A. S. Griboyedov".

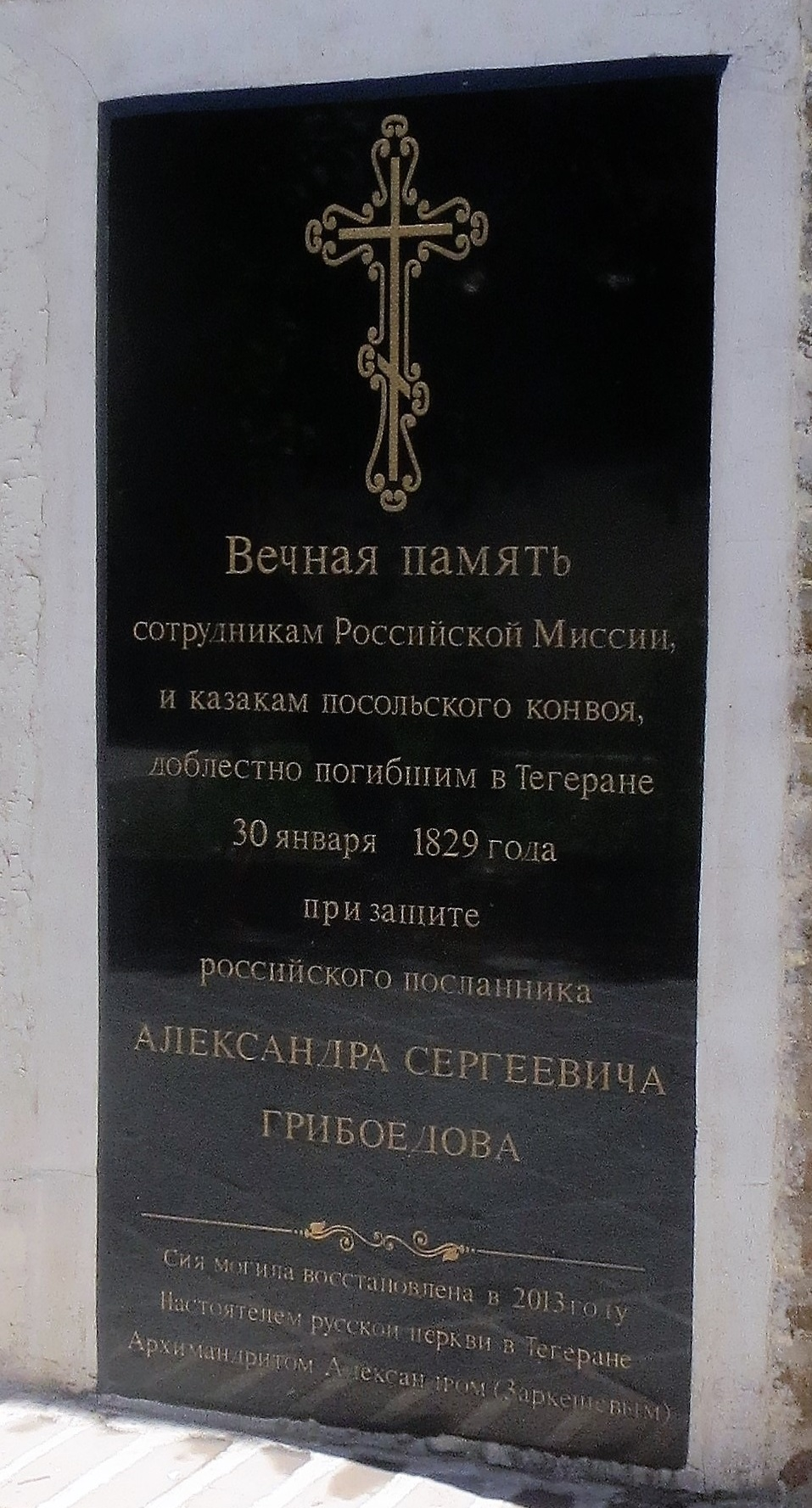
Memorial stone for A. S. Griboyedov in the Armenian St Thaddaeus Church, Tehran, Iran

Several months after his wedding to Nino, the 16-year-old daughter of his friend Prince Chavchavadze, Griboyedov was suddenly sent to Persia as Minister Plenipotentiary. In the aftermath of the Russo–Persian War of 1826–1828 and the humiliating Treaty of Turkmenchay, there was strong anti-Russian sentiment in Persia. Upon arrival in Tehran, the Order of the Lion and the Sun was conferred on him. Soon after Griboyedov's arrival, a mob stormed the Russian embassy.

The incident began when an Armenian eunuch escaped from the harem of the Persian shah, and at the same time two enslaved Armenian women escaped from the harem of the Shah's son-in-law. All three sought refuge at the Russian legation. As agreed in the Treaty of Turkmenchay, Georgians and Armenians living in Persia at that time were permitted to move to Russian-controlled Georgia and Eastern Armenia. However, the Shah demanded that Griboyedov return the three escapees. Griboyedov refused. His decision caused an uproar throughout the city and several thousand Persians encircled the Russian compound demanding their release.

Soon after, urged on by the mullahs, the mob stormed the building. A high-ranking Muslim scholar, Mirza Masih Astarabadi, issued a fatwa saying that freeing Muslim women from the claws of unbelievers is allowed.

Griboyedov and other members of his mission had prepared for a siege and sealed all the windows and doors. Armed and in full uniform, they were resolved to defend to the last drop of blood. Although small in number, the Cossack detachment assigned to protect the legation held off the mob for over an hour until finally being driven back to Griboyedov's office. There, Griboyedov and the Cossacks resisted until the mob broke through the roof of the building, and then through the ceiling, to slaughter them. The escaped eunuch and Griboyedov, who fought with his sword, were among the first to be shot to death; the fate of the two Armenian women remains unknown. Second secretary of the mission Karl Adelung and, in particular, a young doctor whose name is not known, fought hard, but soon the scene was one of butchered, decapitated corpses.

Griboyedov's body, thrown from a window, was decapitated by a kebab vendor who displayed the head on his stall. The mob dragged the uniformed corpse through the city's streets and bazaars, to cries of celebration. It was eventually abandoned on a garbage heap after three days of ill-treatment by the mob, such that in the end it could be identified only by a duelling injury to a finger. The following June, Griboyedov's friend Alexander Pushkin, travelling through the South Caucasus, encountered some men from Tehran leading an oxcart. The men told Pushkin they were conveying the ambassador's remains to Tiflis (now Tbilisi). Griboyedov was buried there, in the monastery of St. David (Mtatsminda Pantheon). When Nino, Griboyedov's widow, received news of his death she gave premature birth to a child who died a few hours later.

In a move to compensate Russia for the attack and the death of its ambassador, the Shah sent his grandson Khosrow Mirza to Saint Petersburg to avoid another war with Tsar Nicholas I. The Shah also gifted to the Tsar the Shah Diamond.

Russian sources claim that British agents, who feared Russian influence in Tehran, and Persian reactionaries, who were not satisfied with the Treaty of Turkmenchay, were responsible for inciting the mob. According to George Bournoutian, the Tsar and General Paskevich likely did not greatly regret the loss of Griboyedov, who held liberal beliefs and favored autonomy for Christians in Transcaucasia. The Russo–Turkish War of 1828–1829 might have been another reason for the Russian inaction. His wife had written on his tombstone in Tiflis: "Your mind and works are immortal in Russian memory, but why has my love outlived you?"

== Legacy ==
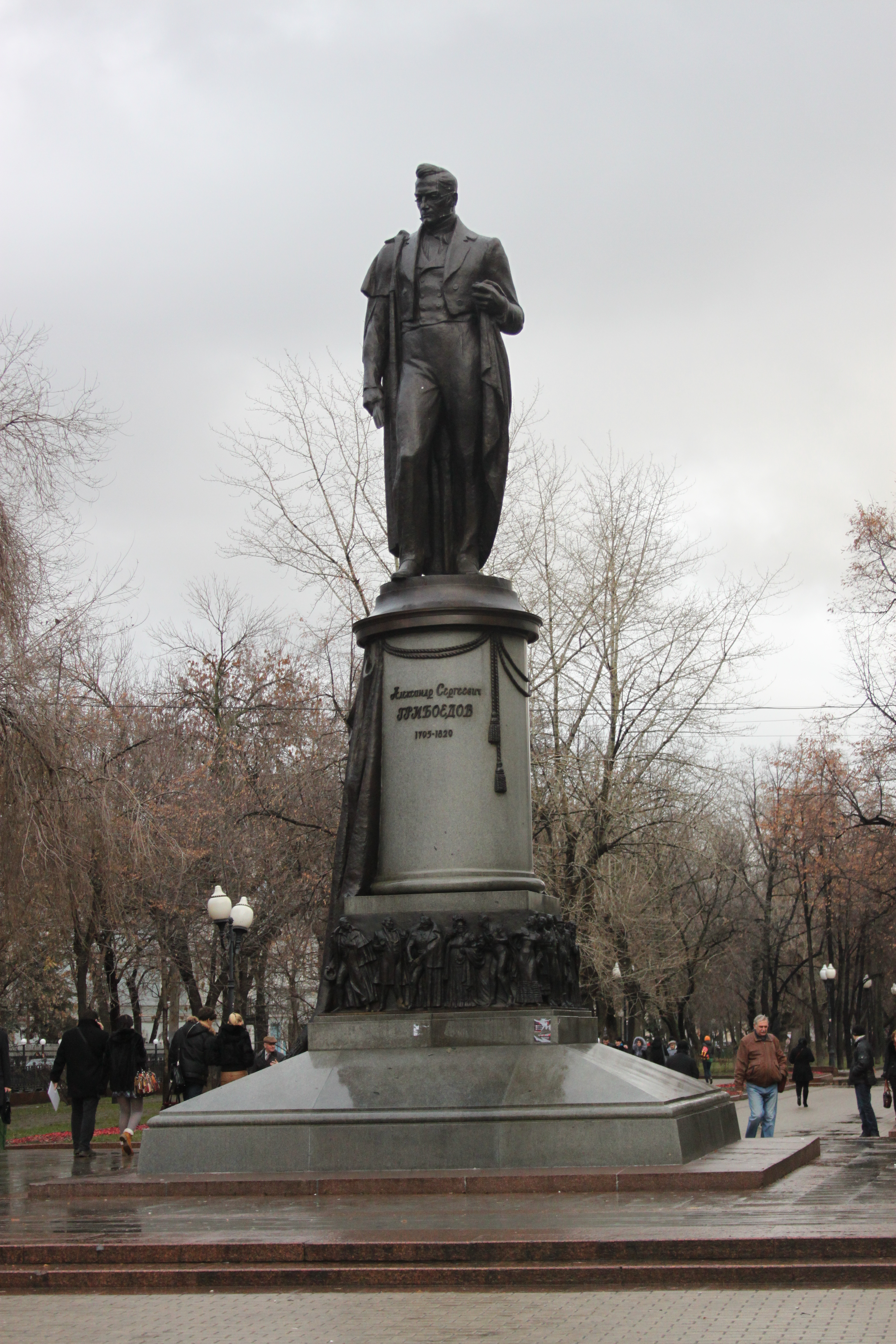
Monument in Moscow

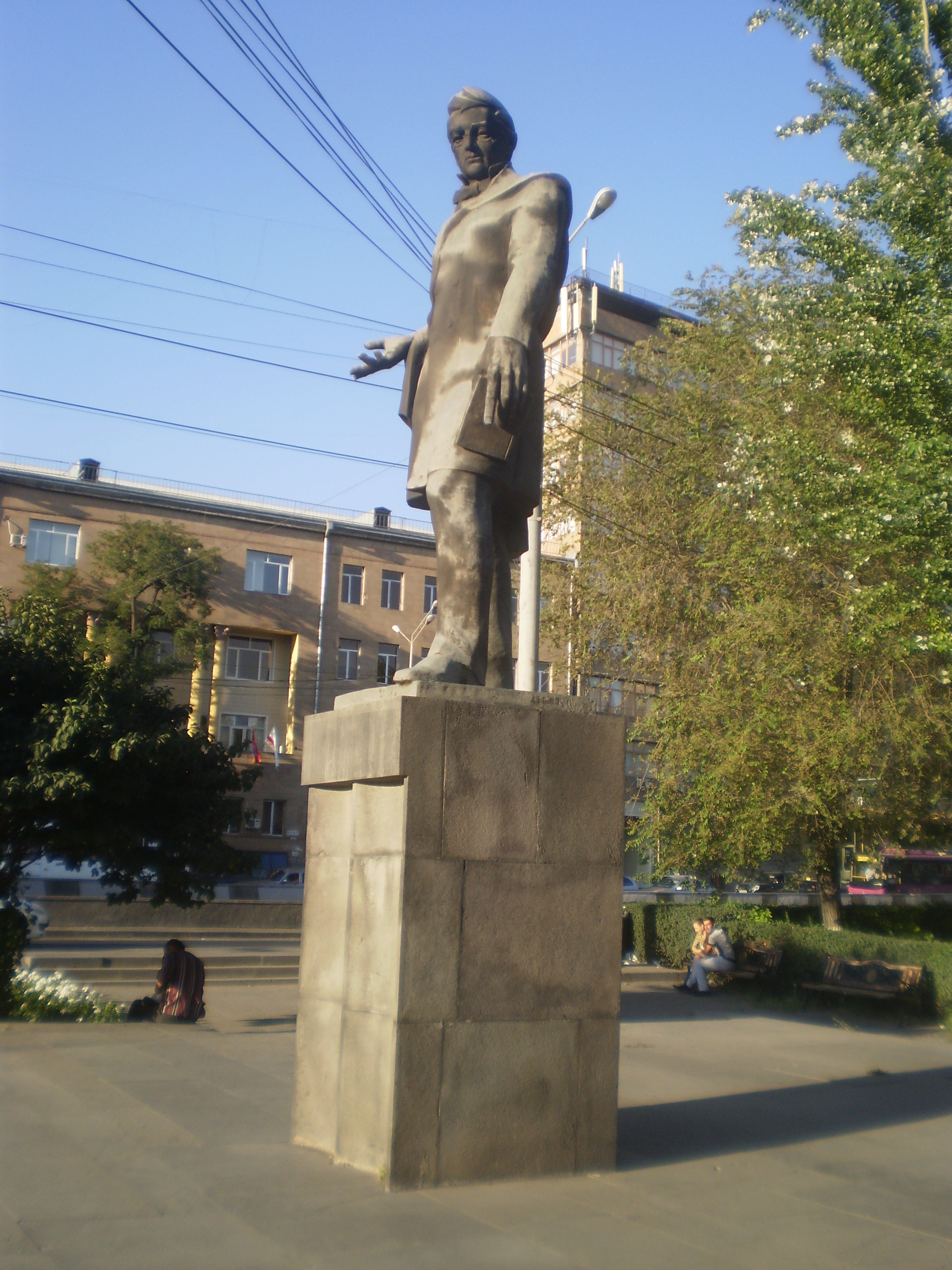
Griboyedov's statue in Yerevan, Armenia

Author Angela Brintlinger has said that "not only did Griboyedov's contemporaries conceive of his life as the life of a literary hero—ultimately writing a number of narratives featuring him as an essential character—but indeed Griboyedov saw himself as a hero and his life as a narrative. Although there is not a literary artifact to prove this, by examining Griboyedov's letters and dispatches, one is able to build a historical narrative that fits the literary and behavioural paradigms of his time and that reads like a real adventure novel set in the wild, wild East."

One of the main settings for Mikhail Bulgakov's satirical novel The Master and Margarita is named after Griboyedov, as is the Griboyedov Canal in Central Saint Petersburg. One of the central streets of Tbilisi, the capital of Georgia, is named after Griboyedov. This street is crossed by Alexander Chavchavadze street, named after Griboyedov's father-in-law, famous Georgian poet, Alexander Chavchavadze.

On 17 April 1944, Pravda ran a lengthy feature on the commemoration of Griboyedov's 150th birthday when high-ranking officials, military leaders, diplomats, writers, and artists had attended a celebration in the Bolshoi Theatre. Novelist and Stalin deputy Leonid Leonov eulogized Griboyedov, mentioning especially his love of his fatherland.

The reception to the Shah's grandson Khosrow Mirza in the Winter Palace, and Tsar Nicholas receiving from him the Shah Diamond, are featured in the 2002 Russian film Russian Ark.

== Commemoration ==
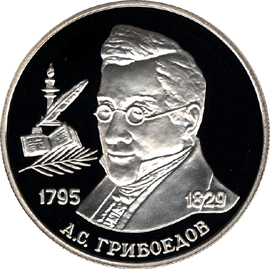
Commemorative coin of the Bank of Russia dedicated to the 200th anniversary of the birth of A. S. Griboyedov. 2 rubles, silver, 1995

=== Monuments ===
- In Saint Petersburg, the monument of A. S. Griboyedov (sculptor V. V. Lishev, 1959) is located on Zagorodny Prospekt on Pionerskaya Square (in front of the Bryantsev Youth Theatre)
- In the center of Yerevan there is a monument of A. S. Griboyedov (sculptor Hovhannes Bejanyan, 1974).
- In Alushta, a monument of A. S. Griboyedov was erected in 2002, on the 100th anniversary of the city.
- In Moscow, the monument of A. S. Griboyedov is located on Chistoprudny Boulevard.
- In Veliky Novgorod, A. S. Griboyedov was immortalized in the monument "Millennium of Russia", in the group of sculptures "Writers and Artists".
- In Volgograd, at the expense of the Armenian community of the city, a bust of A. S. Griboyedov was installed on Sovetskaya Street, in front of Polyclinic No.3.
- In Tbilisi, a monument of A. S. Griboyedov is located on the Kura embankment (sculptor M. Merabishvili, architect G. Melkadze, 1961).
- In Tehran, the Russian embassy has a monument of A.S. Griboyedov (sculptor V. A. Beklemishev, 1912).
- A bust of A. S. Griboyedov is installed on the facade of the Odessa Opera and Ballet Theater.

=== Streets ===
There are streets named after Griboyedov in many cities of Russia and neighboring countries.

List of places

Russia

- Almetyevsk,
- Petrozavodsk,
- Perm,
- Chelyabinsk,
- Krasnoyarsk,
- Kaliningrad,
- Surgut,
- Simferopol,
- Sevastopol,
- Bryansk,
- Ekaterinburg,
- Novokuznetsk,
- Novorossiysk,
- Novosibirsk,
- Ryazan,
- Dzerzhinsk (Nizhny Novgorod Oblast),
- Irkutsk,
- Makhachkala,
- Gelendzhik,
- Kovrov,
- Tver,
- Tyumen,
- Kirov,
- Essentuki;

Belarus

- Brest
- Vitebsk,
- Minsk

Ukraine

- Khmelnitsky,
- Vinnitsa,
- Kharkiv,
- Kherson,
- Irpin,
- Bila Tserkva,
- Chernivtsi

Armenia

- Yerevan,
- Gyumri,
- Sevan

Other places

- Bălți (Moldova),
- Rîbnița (Transnistria),
- Alma-Ata (Kazakhstan),
- Batumi (Georgia),
- Tbilisi (Georgia),
- Ashgabat (Turkmenistan).

=== Theaters ===
- Smolensk Drama Theater. A. S. Griboyedov.
- Tbilisi has a theater named after A. S. Griboyedov, a monument (author - M. K. Merabishvili).

=== Museum ===
- The State Historical, Cultural and Natural Museum-Reserve of A. S. Griboyedov "Khmelita" in Vyazemsky District, Smolensk Oblast, Russia.
- In Crimea, in the Red Cave (Kizil-Koba), a gallery is named in honor of A. S. Griboyedov's stay.

=== Libraries ===
- Library of National Literature named after A. S. Griboyedov in Saint Petersburg.
- The Central Library named after A. S. Griboyedov of the Centralized Library System #2 of the Central Administrative District of Moscow. On the 100th anniversary of the founding of the library, a memorial museum was opened in it, giving A. S. Griboyedov award there.

=== Other ===
- Yury Tynyanov wrote the novel The Death of Vazir-Mukhtar (1928) about the last years of Griboyedov's life
- On April 22, 2014, in Saint Petersburg, the Grand Lodge of Russia created the Lodge of A. S. Griboyedov (No. 45 in the register of VLR).
- Secondary school No. 203 named after A. S. Griboyedov in St. Petersburg.
- Annual the Moscow City Humanitarian Conference called "Griboyedov readings" for research and design work of students.
- Moscow gymnasium No. 1529 named after A. S. Griboyedov.
- In Moscow there is a higher educational institution - Institute of International Law and Economics named after A. S. Griboyedov.
- Scholarship named after A. S. Griboyedov, established by the Academic Council of Lomonosov Moscow State University.
- The Airbus 330-243 (VQ-BBF) aircraft of Aeroflot Airlines is named after A.S. Griboyedov.
- In 1995, the Central Bank of Russia issued a coin (2 rubles, silver 500) from the series "Outstanding Personalities of Russia" with the image on the reverse of the portrait of A. S. Griboyedov - on the occasion of the 200th anniversary of his birth.
- Medal "A. S. Griboedov, 1795-1829" that was established by the Moscow City Organization of the Union of Writers of the Russian Federation and is awarded to writers, prominent philanthropists and famous publishers for their ascetic activities for the benefit of Russian culture and literature.
- The Soviet Union released two stamps depicting Griboyedov: 125th Death Anniversary of Alexander Griboyedov stamp (issued in 1954) and a stamp from the Russian Writers series (issued in 1959

== Compositions ==
Griboyedov, Waltz in E minor
Performed by Constantin Stephan

=== Waltzes ===
- Waltz in E minor
- Waltz in A-flat major

=== Opera ===
- 1824: Who is a Brother, Who is a Sister, or Deception for Deception (Wrote the accompanying score to the stage play by the composer and P. A. Vyazemsky)

== See also ==
- Vatslav Vorovsky, Soviet envoy at the Conference of Lausanne, assassinated in 1923
- Pyotr Voykov, Soviet ambassador to Poland, assassinated in 1927
- Andrei Karlov, Russian ambassador to Turkey, assassinated in 2016

== Sources ==
- Brintlinger, Angela. "The Persian Frontier: Griboyedov as Orientalist and Literary Hero". Canadian Slavonic Papers 45, no. 3 (2003): 371–393.
- This article incorporates text from D.S. Mirsky's "A History of Russian Literature" (1926-27), a publication now in the public domain.
- Pravda, April 17, 1944, page 4
