= Lazo =

Lazo may refer to:

== Places ==
- imeni Lazo District, a district in Khabarovsk Krai, Russia
- Lazo, Russia, name of several rural localities in Russia
- Lazo, a village in Hăsnăşenii Noi Commune, Drochia District, Moldova
- Lazo, a village in Alava Commune, Ştefan Vodă District, Moldova
- Cape Lazo, a headland on the Comox Peninsula, Vancouver Island, British Columbia, Canada
- Estación Lazo, a municipality in Entre Ríos Province, Argentina

== Other uses ==
- Lazo (surname)
- Lazo (musician), a musician from Dominica
- Alternative spelling of lasso

== See also ==
- Lazovsky (disambiguation)
