= Krivošije =

Microregion in southwestern Montenegro

Coordinates: 42.55°N 18.65°E

- Interactive map of Krivošije

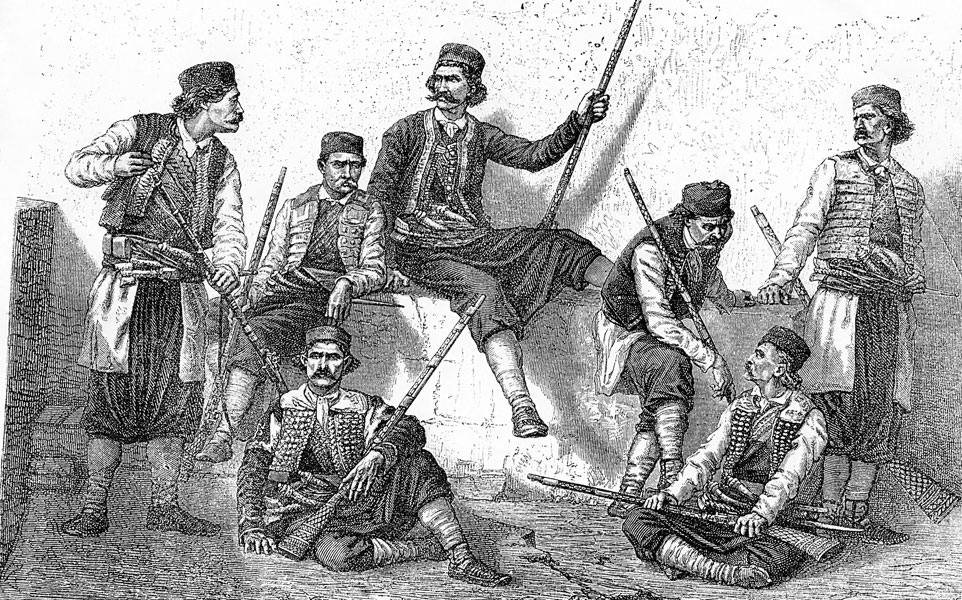
Krivošije warriors, woodcut from Světozor magazine (5 June 1878)

Krivošije (Cyrillic: Кривошије, pronounced [kriv̞ɔ̌ʃijɛ]) is a microregion in southwestern Montenegro, located on a high plateau belonging to the Orjen mountain range, north of the Bay of Kotor. Krivošije was historically located at a tripoint between the Principality of Montenegro, Austro-Hungarian (formerly Venetian) Bay of Kotor and Ottoman Sanjak of Herzegovina.

== Geography ==
Krivošije are a mountainous karst region above Risan, located at around 1000 metres above the sea level, spanning on 114 km^{2} of land. It is a high plateau on the northern and eastern branches of Mount Orjen (1894 m) in southwest Montenegro, near in the hinterland of the Bay of Kotor. A significant geological and geomorphological feature of the region are the glacial deposits distributed across the whole of the plateau. They were deposited by valley glaciers coming from Orjen during the Ice Age. Krivošije is the region with the greatest rainfall in Europe.

Reovačka greda is a mountain ridge located near Crkvice in central Krivošije, is the location of the region's highest peak Pazua (1769 m), which is used for trad climbing.

Settlements in the region include Crkvice (inhabited location with the highest annual precipitation in the Europe), Dragalj, Han, Malov Do, Knežlaz, Ubli, Unijerina and Zvečava.

== History ==
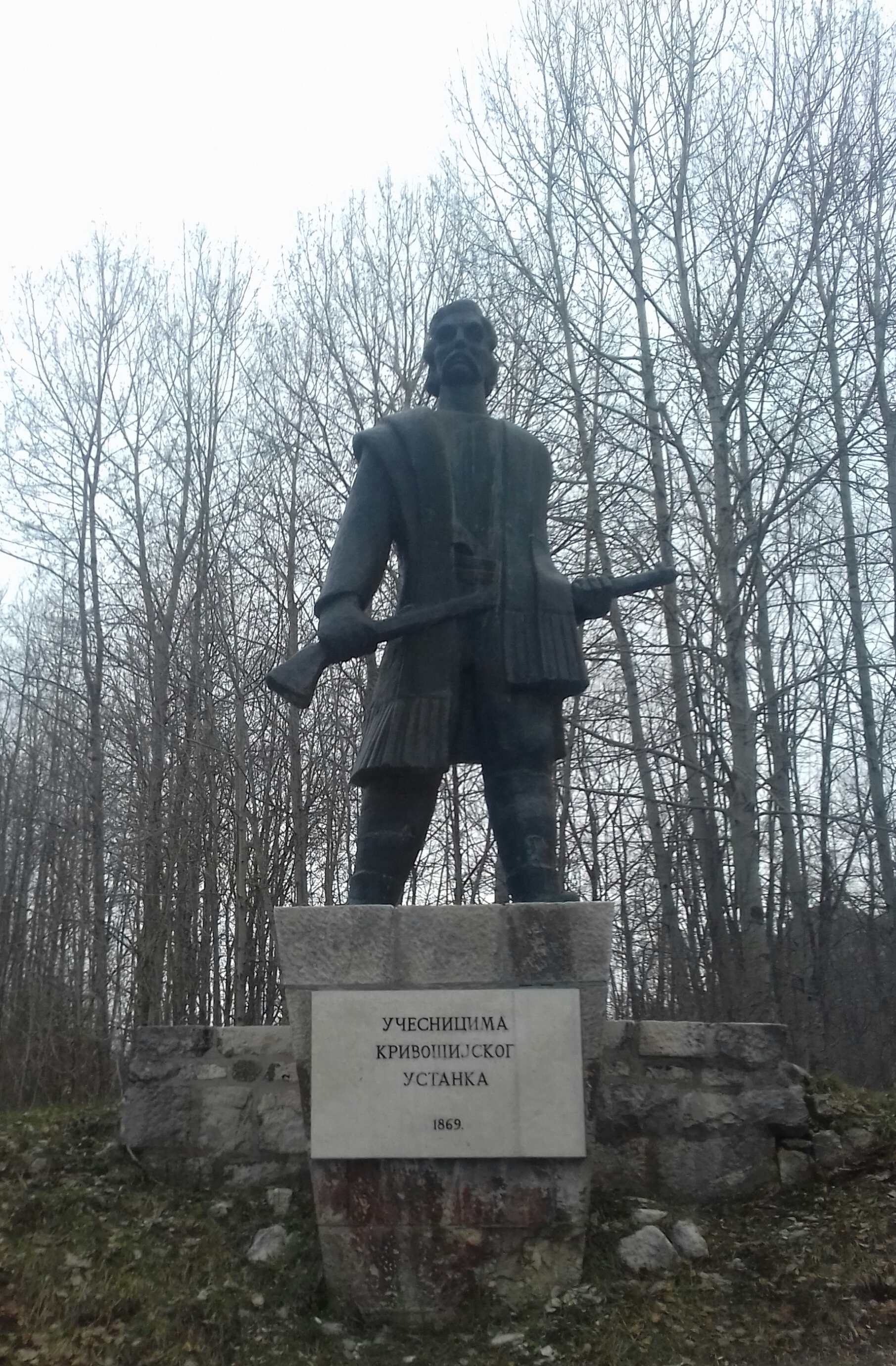
Monument in Crkvice dedicated to rebels of the Krivošije Uprising

Krivošije was under Austro-Hungarian control (as part of the Kingdom of Dalmatia) since the Congress of Vienna in 1814. In 1869 an uprising of the local population, which was Orthodox Serb defeated an expedition force of the powerful Austro-Hungarian army that was attempting to enforce compulsory military service; Austria-Hungary abandoned its efforts, for the time being. Volunteers from the region joined the Serb rebels in the Herzegovina Uprising (1875–77).

During World War II, population of Krivošije was equally divided between Partisans and Chetniks. After 1942 and before capitulation of Italy, region was Chetnik stronghold. Local merchant Miloš Kovač organized an armed band of 80 men in Krivošije which threatened Yugoslav Partisan access and control in the region. However, two Partisan detachments were also established in Krivošije under the Communist Party cell in Herceg Novi. In September 1944, the battles of the 10th Montenegrin NOV brigade in Krivošije had the largest echo in the Bay of Kotor and Paštrovići.

== Demographics ==
Mountainous Krivošije region was mostly inhabited by the tribes of Old Montenegro, but also partially by settlers from Herzegovina. The following families were listed as inhabitants of Krivošije: Radulović, Vučurović, Samardžić, Odalović, Kovač, Radojičić, Ilić, Bojanić, Kokotović, Vukićević, Komnenović, Tomović, Vodovar, Žmukić, Popović, Blagojević, Lakićević, Subotić, Miletić, Vidović and Lazović.

Krivošije region faced significant demographic outflows in recent decades, particularly towards the Bay of Kotor. As of 2018, Krivošije, which covers roughly a third of the Kotor Municipality, has only around 110 permanent residents, in comparison with 1,053 inhabitants recorded in 1953.

== Culture ==
Most common slava (patron saint day) of the Krivošije clan is St. John the Baptist (Jovanjdan), celebrated on 20 January.

The following churches were built in Krivošije:

- Church of St. Petka in Poljice, built in the second half of the 17th or 18th century.
- Pokrov Bogorodice in Dragalj, built in 1867.
- Roždestvo Bogorodice in Malov Do, built in 1831.
- Church of St. John in Zvečava, built in the second half of the 17th century.

A species of funnel-web spider called Histopona krivosijana was named after the region after its discovery there in 1935.

== Sources ==
- Ćosović, Stevo (2005). Славно доба Херцеговине: спомен-књига о Херцеговачком устанку 1875-1878. Svet knjige. ISBN 9788673961088.
- Đorđević, Vladan (1924). Црна Гора и Аусгрија 1814 — 1894. Belgrade.
- Erdeljanović, Jovan (1977). Etničko srodstvo Bokelja i Crnogoraca. Narodna biblioteka Radosav Ljumović. ISBN 9788672600049.
- Komar, Goran (1995). Orijenski masiv. Herceg Novi: Samizdat.
- Kostić, Lazo M. (1961). O srpskom karakteru Boke Kotorske. Sfairos.
- Kostić, Lazo M. (1970). Stogodišnjica I [i.e. prvog] Krivošijskog ustanka, 1869-1969: istorijska i pravna rasprava. Iskra.
- Luković, Niko (1951). Boka Kotorska: kulturno-istoriski vođ. Narodna knjiga.
- Mijušković, Slavko (1970). Ustanak u Boki Kotorskoj 1869. Centar za kulturu.
- Nikolić, Katarina (2003). "Црквени споменици на подручју Кривошија и Леденица (I део)". БОКА. Rastko.
- Nikolić, Katarina (2004). "Црквени споменици на подручју Кривошија и Леденица (II део)" (PDF). БОКА. Rastko.
- Radojičić, Dragana (2006). Између култура Истока и Запада: северозападна Бока Которска. Etnografski institut SANU. ISBN 978-86-7587-037-1.
- Radojičić, Lazar B. (1934). Кривошије и Кривошијани: Њихова буна, борба и рат за ослобођење 1869 год. у борби против Аустро-мађарског царства. Nikšić: Slobodna misao.
- Vojnoistorijski institut (1963). Vojno-istoriski glasnik. Vol. 14. Belgrade: Vojnoistorijski institut.
- Vučetić, Stevan J. (1947). Građanski rat u Crnoj Gori, 1941-1945. Crnogorski prosvetni klub.
- Stillman, William (1904). The Autobiography of a Journalist. Harvard University: Houghton, Mifflin. ISBN 9781414295787.
