= Laskowski =

Laskowski (feminine: Laskowska, plural: Laskowscy) is a Polish surname. It may refer to:

- Casey Laskowski, American politician and mortician
- Chris Laskowski (born 1981), American football player
- Erwin Laskowski (1914–1983), German Luftwaffe ace
- George Laskowski
- Irena Laskowska (1925–2019), Polish actress
- Ivan Laskovsky (1799–1855), Russian pianist and composer
- Jacek Laskowski (born 1967), Polish sports commentator
- John Laskowski (born 1953), American basketball player
- Karolina Laskowska (born 1992), British fashion designer
- Kazimierz Laskowski (1899–1961), Polish fencer and military officer
- Mark Laskowski (born 1968), American voice actor
- Natalia Bamber-Laskowska (born 1982), Polish volleyball player
- Paweł Hulka-Laskowski (1881–1946), Polish writer
- Philip Laskowsky (1889–1960), Polish and American Yiddish theatre composer
- Roman Laskowski (1936–2014), Polish linguist
- Tomasz Laskowski (born 1984), Polish footballer
- Zygmunt Laskowski (1841–1928), Polish physician

== See also ==
- Poręba Laskowska, Gmina Skała, Lesser Poland Voivodeship, in southern Poland
