= Third bombardment of mount Lovćen =

1916 battle of invasion of Montenegro during WWI

Battle of Lovćen
- Part of the Montenegrin campaign of World War I
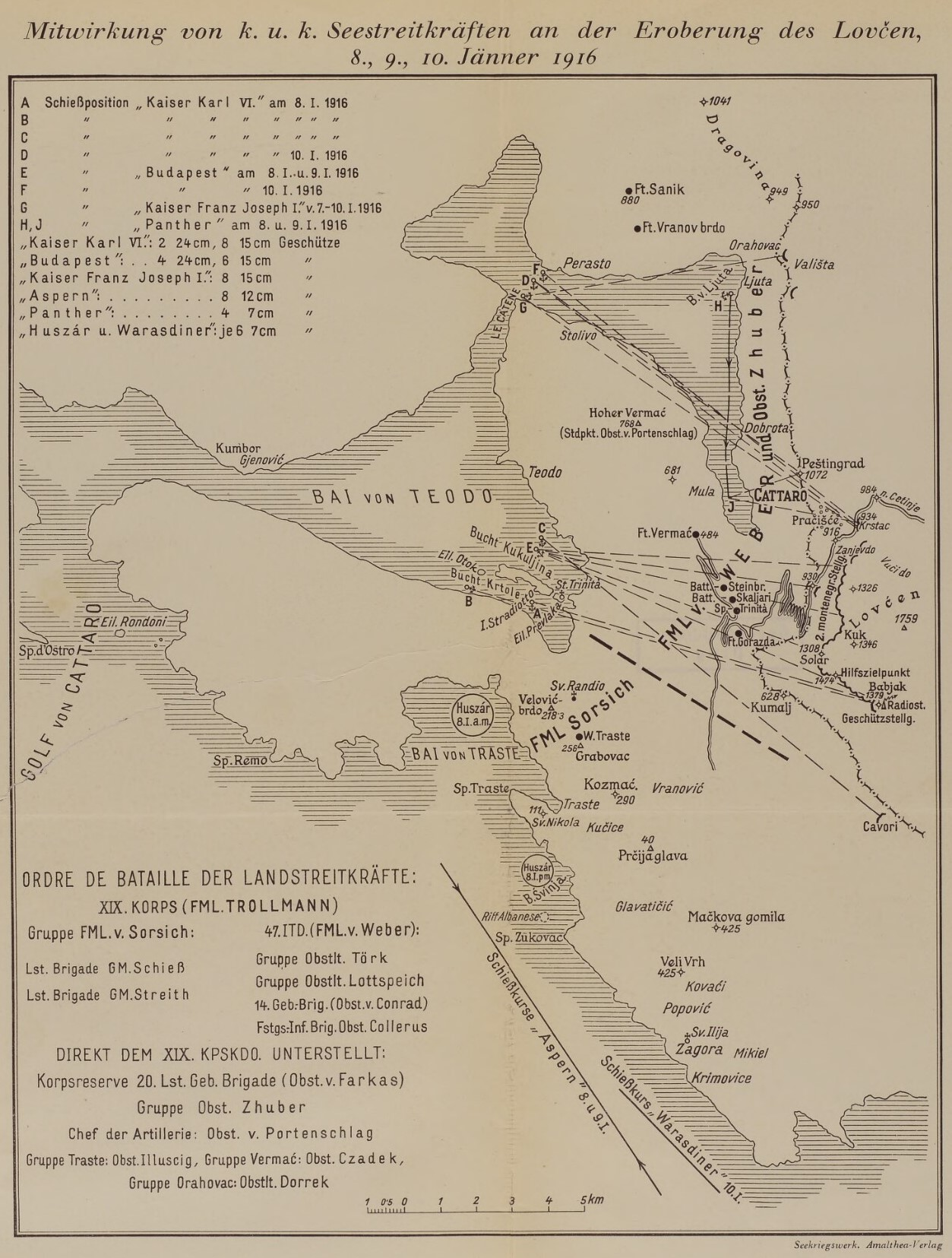
Date	7–11 January 1916
Location	Lovćen, Kingdom of Montenegro 42°23′57″N 18°49′06″E
Result	Austro-Hungarian victory

Belligerents
Austria-Hungary	Montenegro

Commanders and leaders
(Austria-Hungary) Stjepan Sarkotić; (Austria-Hungary) Ignaz Trollmann	(Kingdom of Montenegro) Prince Peter of Montenegro; (Kingdom of Montenegro) Luka Gojnić

Strength
Unknown	c. 9,000

Casualties and losses
Unknown killed; Unknown wounded or missing	Unknown killed; Unknown wounded or missing

The Third bombardment of Mount Lovćen was a military engagement between the joint armies of Austria-Hungary and German Empire against the Kingdom of Montenegro in January 1916. It was a part of the Montenegrin campaign during World War I. After the fighting between 7 and 11 January 1916, the Austro-Hungarians were able to capture heavily fortified positions on the top of Lovćen mountain massif and later enter into Cetinje, former capital of Montenegro. A few days later, the Montenegrin army capitulated and the country was occupied.

== Prelude ==
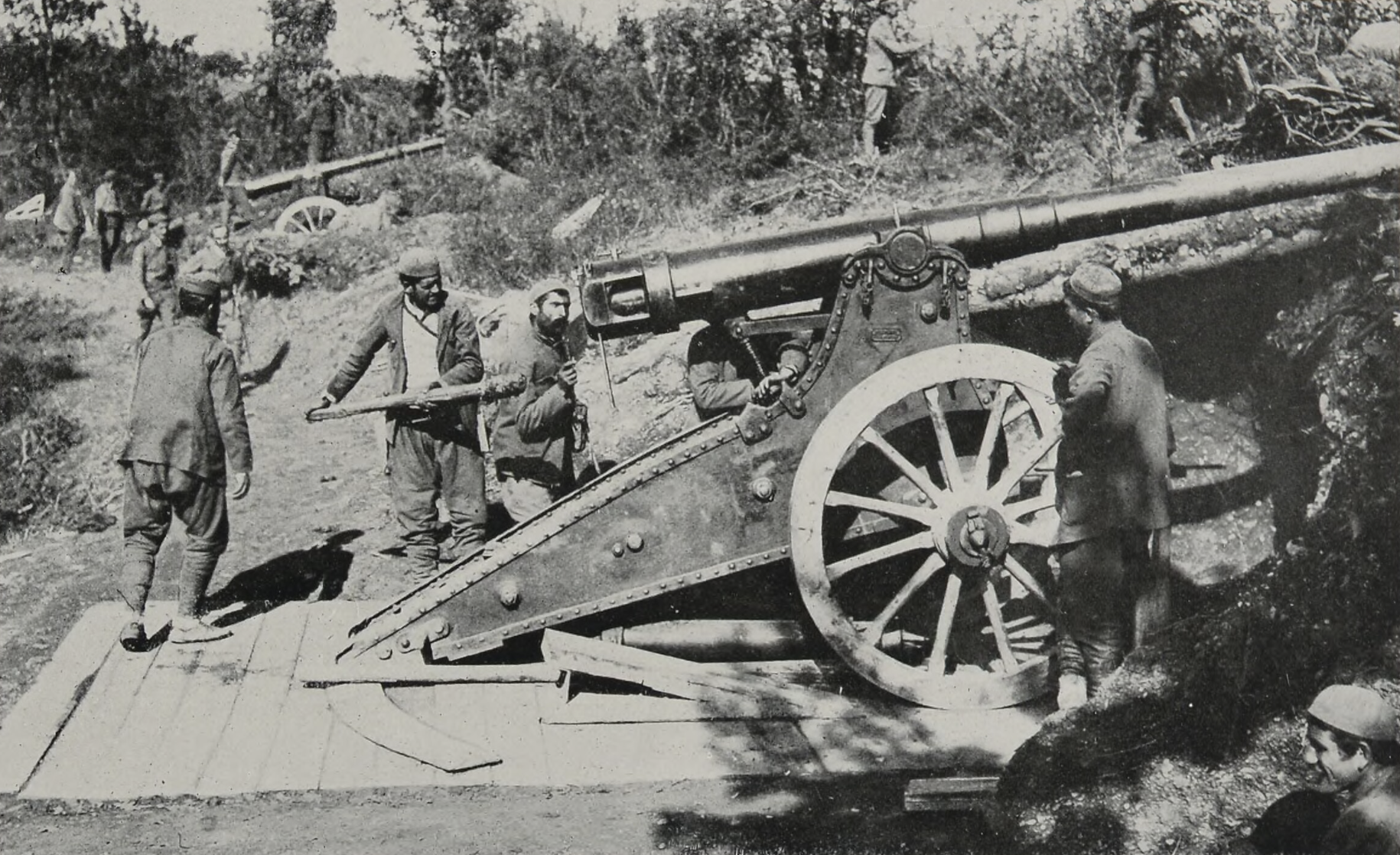
Montenegrin heavy artillery defends Lovćen

Mount Lovćen was the key defensive position of the Montenegrin army, protecting the Montenegrin side of the Bay of Kotor and also the land entrance to the Montenegrin capital Cetinje. Since the beginning of war, artillery bombardments occurred from the Austro-Hungarian naval base at Cattaro (Kotor), situated just across the border from Mount Lovćen, and by the Austro-Hungarian sea fleet, against the Montenegrins, as allies of Serbia.

After the successful Campaign against Serbia in autumn 1915, the Austro-Hungarian High Command decided to invade Montenegro, where Serbians forces were retreating during their so-called Great Retreat. Two Austrian Army corps for this task were formed in December 1915. One in the west under command of Stjepan Sarkotić between Trebinje and Cattaro, composed of the XIX Army Corps (Armeenkorps), reinforced with troops from Bosnia-Herzegovina and Dalmatia. They were to attack the main body of the Montenegrin army, gathered around Mount Lovćen, supported by French artillery, and a second attack was planned from Trebinje towards the east.
In the east and north, the VIII Armeekorps under command of Hermann Kövess von Kövessháza was to attack the Montenegrin troops there.

The attack was launched on 5 January 1916. On the Eastern front, the 62nd and 53rd Austro-Hungarian Infantry Division entered Montenegro from the North-East and advanced along Tara river towards Pljevlja and Bijelo Polje, where they were stopped by the Montenegrins in the Battle of Mojkovac. At the same time, the Austrian 10th and 18th Mountain brigades advanced from Novi Pazar and on 10 January took the city of Berane. The 205th and 9th Mountain brigades advanced westwards from Priština and took Peć and Velika. The 57th Infantry Division advanced from Prizren.

The Lovcen area was defended by 4 Montenegrin brigades of about 9 000 men, approximately 50 artillery guns and 33 machine guns. The defenders were commanded by the young heir to the Montenegrin throne Prince Peter and also consisted of some Serbian units, which included also a few Czech and Slovak volunteers.

== Battle ==
On 7 January 1916 the Austro-Hungarian attack against Montenegrin forces on Lovćen began with a massive artillery bombardment, targeting heavy artillery positions, followed by a land offensive into Montenegro. The Austro-Hungarian coastal battleship Budapest also assisted, as it did in the previous bombardment attacks. The first attack and consequent fall of the border forts Kom and Stražnik, caused panic in Montenegrin lines and later that day,Prince Peter fled to Celje in the afternoon, leaving his units to their fate. Command was then passed to general Luka Gojnić, who promised to retake and hold the defensive positions as long as he and his men could.

In the next days, Austro-Hungarian infantry troops started to climb the steep side of Lovćen mountain massive with continuing artillery support. On 10 January they took control of the Lovćen Pass and the adjacent heights and by 11 January, all the area of the Lovćen ridge was in Austrian hands.

== Aftermath ==
The fall of the defence of Lovćen played a decisive role in breaking the morale of the Montenegrin forces. On 13 January 1916, the vanguard of the Austrian army reached Cetinje. Negotiations for an armistice started immediately after the fall of the city.

=== Rewards ===
General Stjepan Sarkotić was made a Hungarian baron and officially styled Stefan Baron Sarkotić von Lovćen
Major General Ignaz Trollmann, commander of the XIX Corps, was ennobled as baron in 1917 with the style of Freiherr Trollmann von Lovcenberg.

== Gallery ==
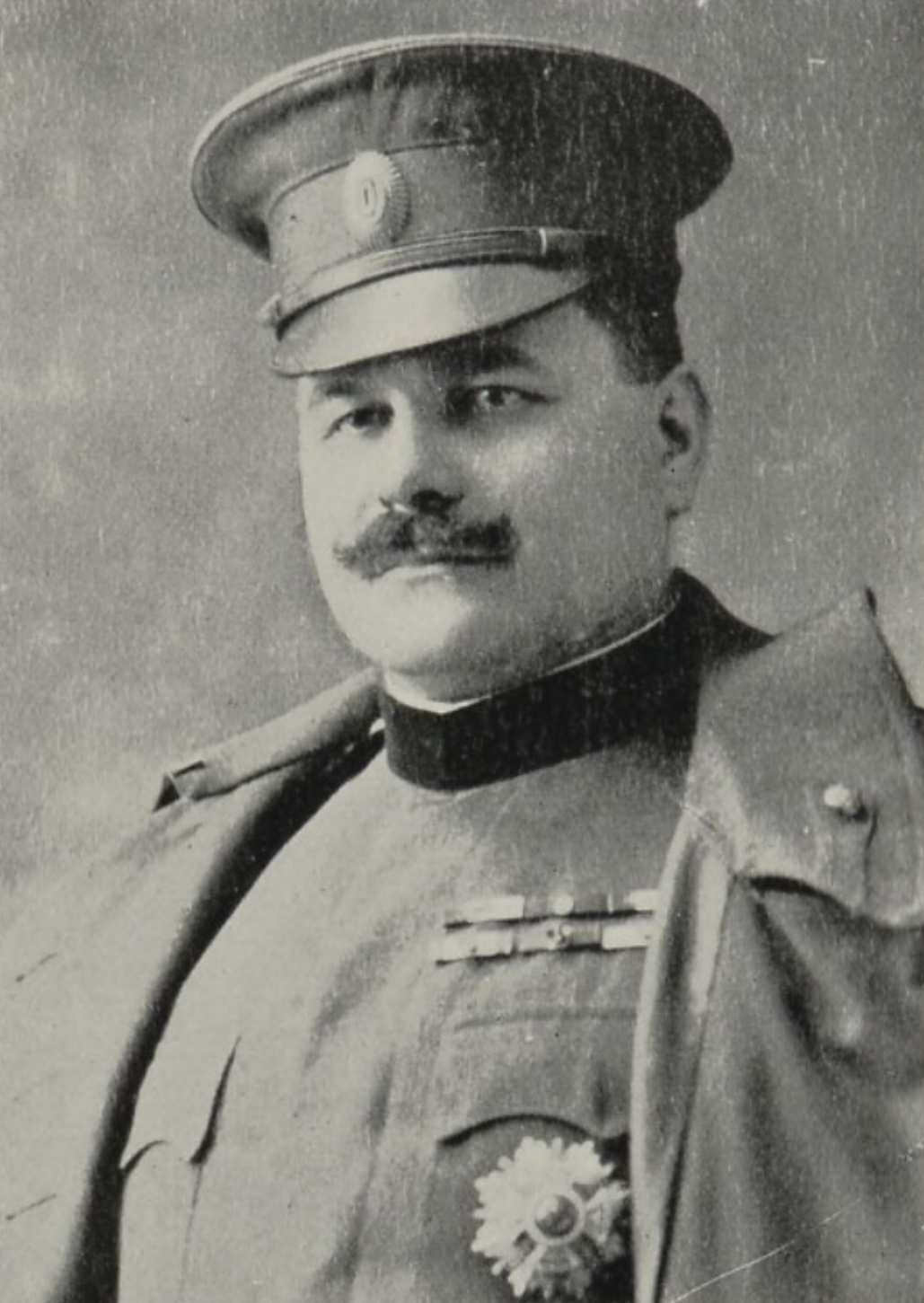
Montenegrin general Luka Gojnić

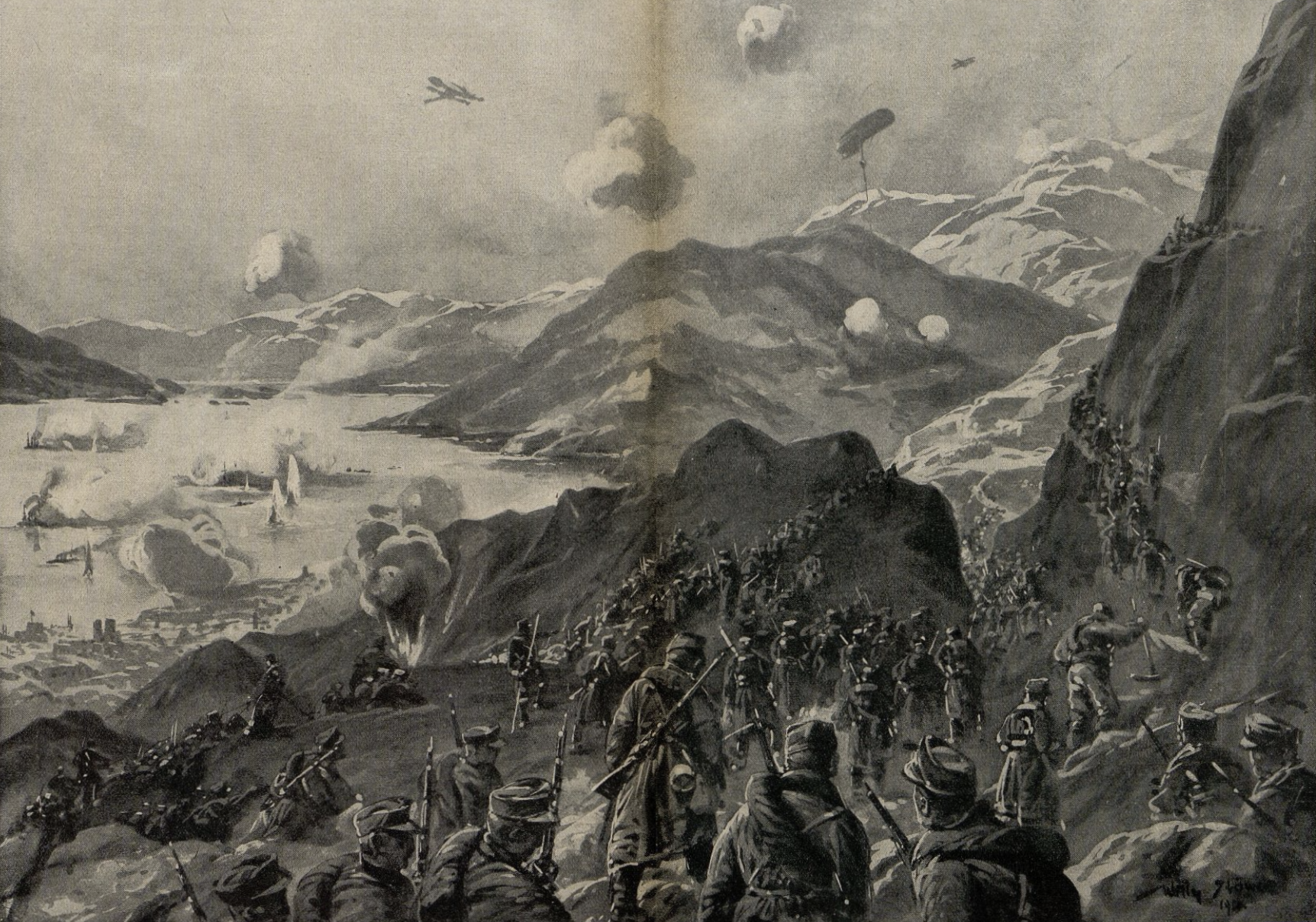
Conquest of Lovcen by Austro-Hungarian troops, supported by the Austro-Hungarian Empire Fleet (illustration by Willy Stöwer)

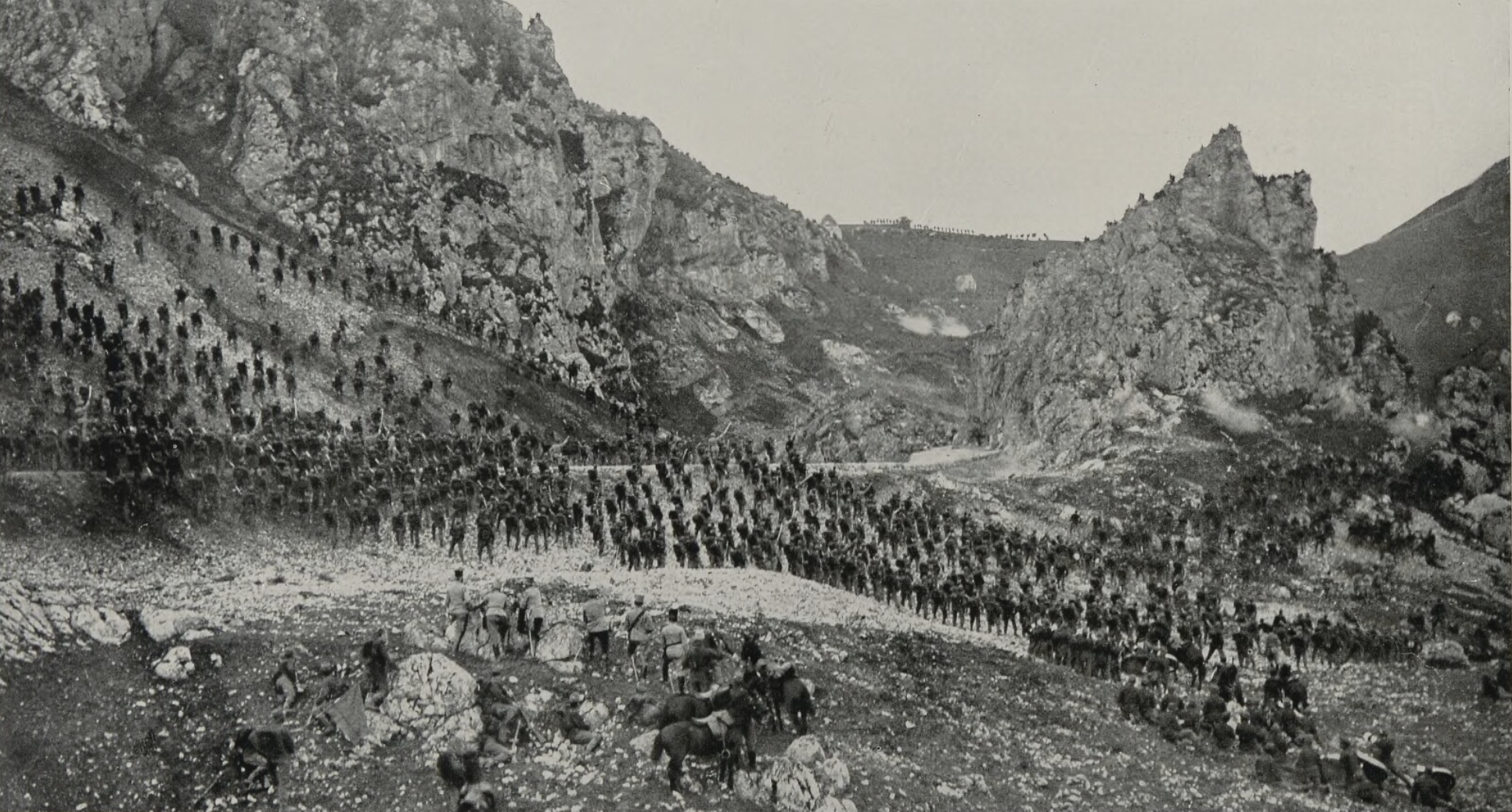
Austro-Hungarian forces on one of the Lovćen plateaus

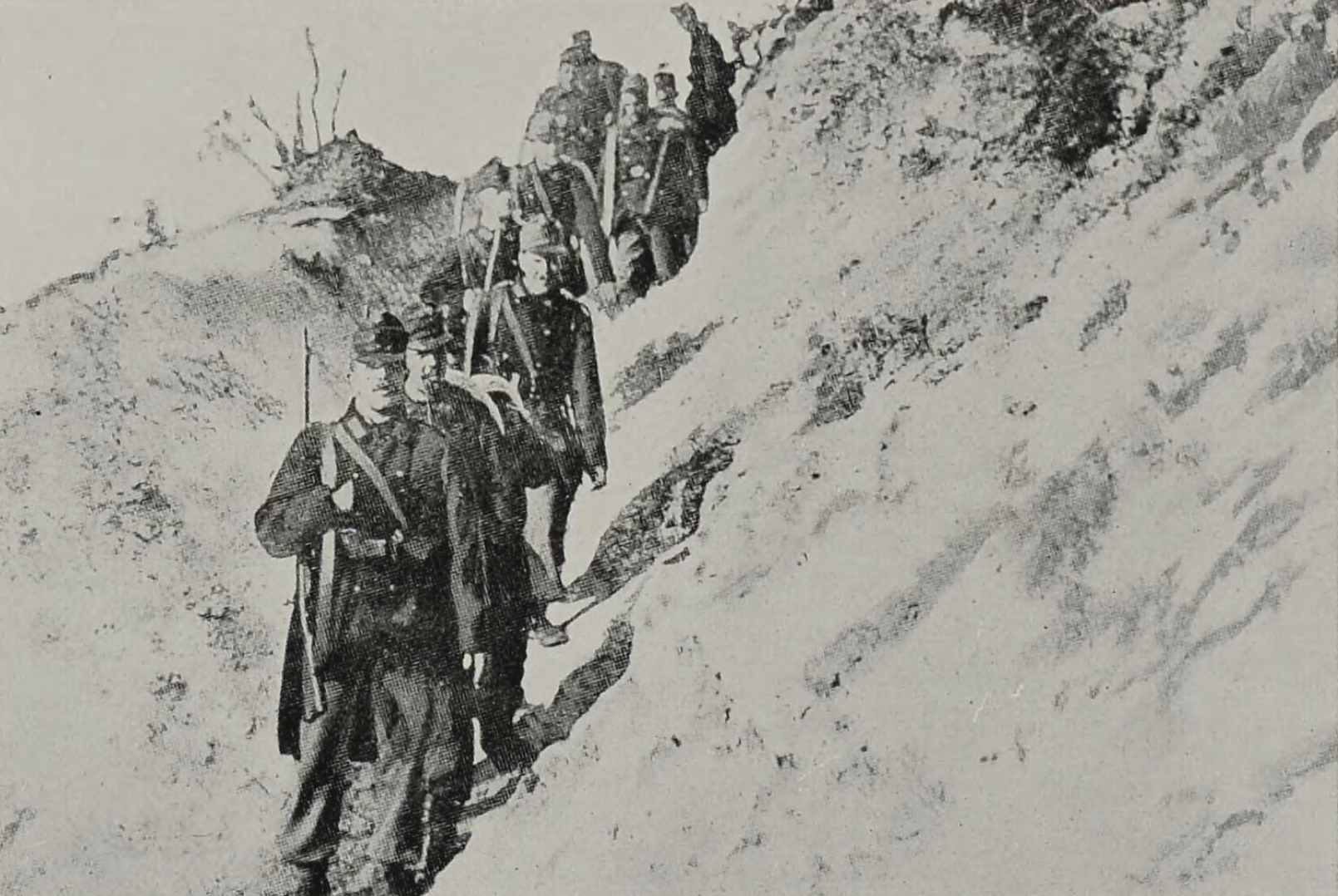
Austro-Hungarian forces heading from Lovćen to Cetinje

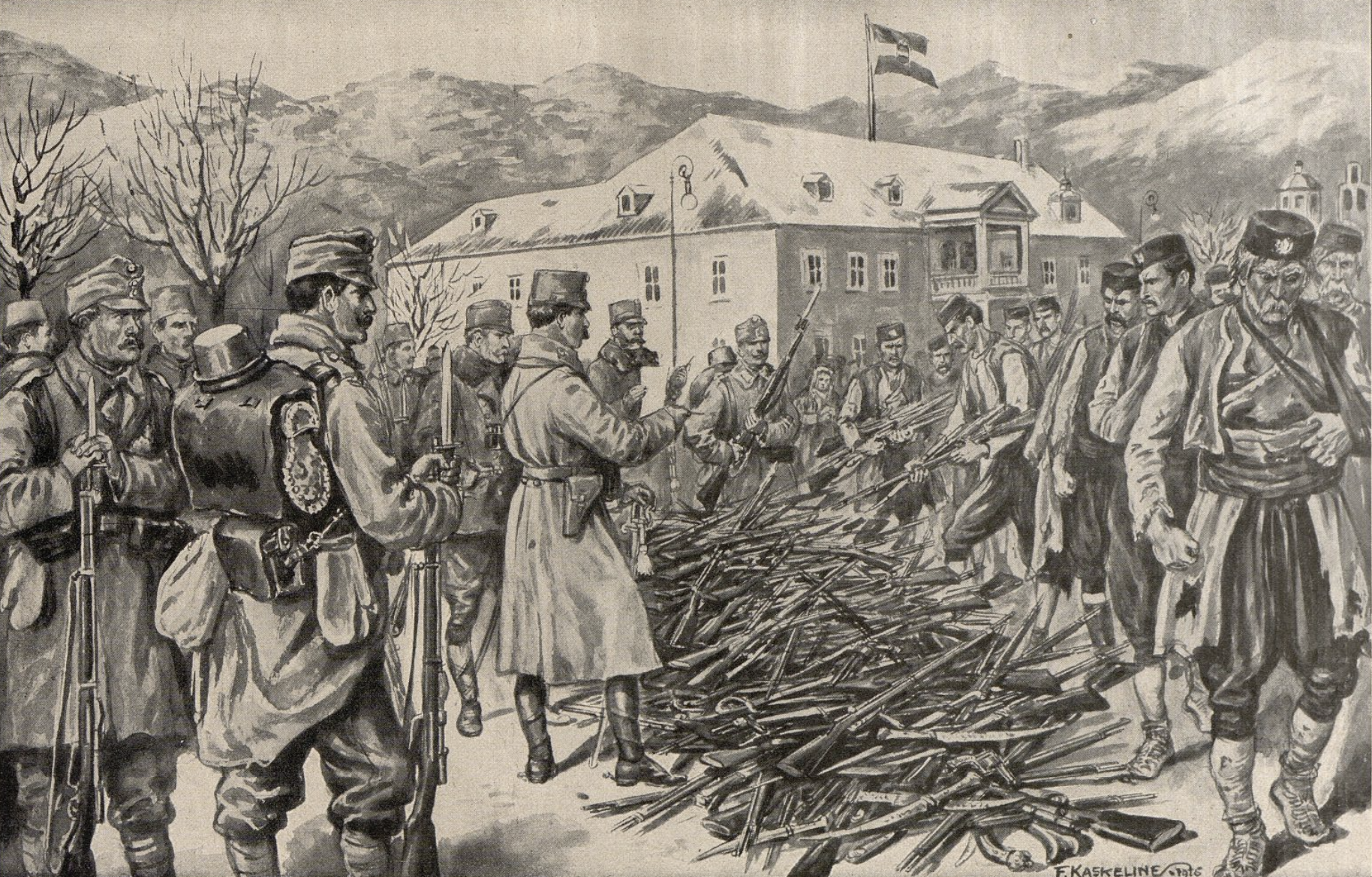
The disarmament of the Montenegrins in Cetinje (illustration by F. Kaskeline)

== See also ==
- Montenegrin campaign
- Austro-Hungarian occupation of Montenegro 1916-1918
- Montenegro in World War I
- History of Montenegro

== Bibliography ==
- DiNardo, Richard L. (2015). Invasion: The Conquest of Serbia, 1915. Santa Barbara: Praeger. ISBN 9781440800924.
- Theodor Konopicky: Der österreichisch-ungarische Krieg, Leipzig: Barth 1922.
- Edmund von Glaise-Horstenau and Österreichischen Bundesministerium für Heereswesen und vom Kriegsarchiv. Österreich-Ungarns letzter Krieg 1914-1918. Wien: Verlag der Militärwissenschaftlichen Mitteilungen, 1933. 4. Band - Beilagen, s. Beilage 3.
- Kryštof, František. Lovčen, nástin historie černohorské účasti ve světové válce ; Legie ze Srbska (in Czech). Hradec Králové: František Šupka. p. 55.
- Noppen, Ryan & Wright, Paul: Austro-Hungarian Battleships 1914–18, Osprey Publishing, Oxford, UK, 2012, pp. 28–30. ISBN 978-1-84908-688-2
- Srdja Pavlovic: Balkan Anschluss: The Annexation of Montenegro and the Creation of the Common South Slavic State, West Lafayette (Indiana): Purdue University Press 2008, pp. 75–86.
- Hermann Baron Kövess von Kövessháza
