= Reovačka greda =

- Реовачка греда
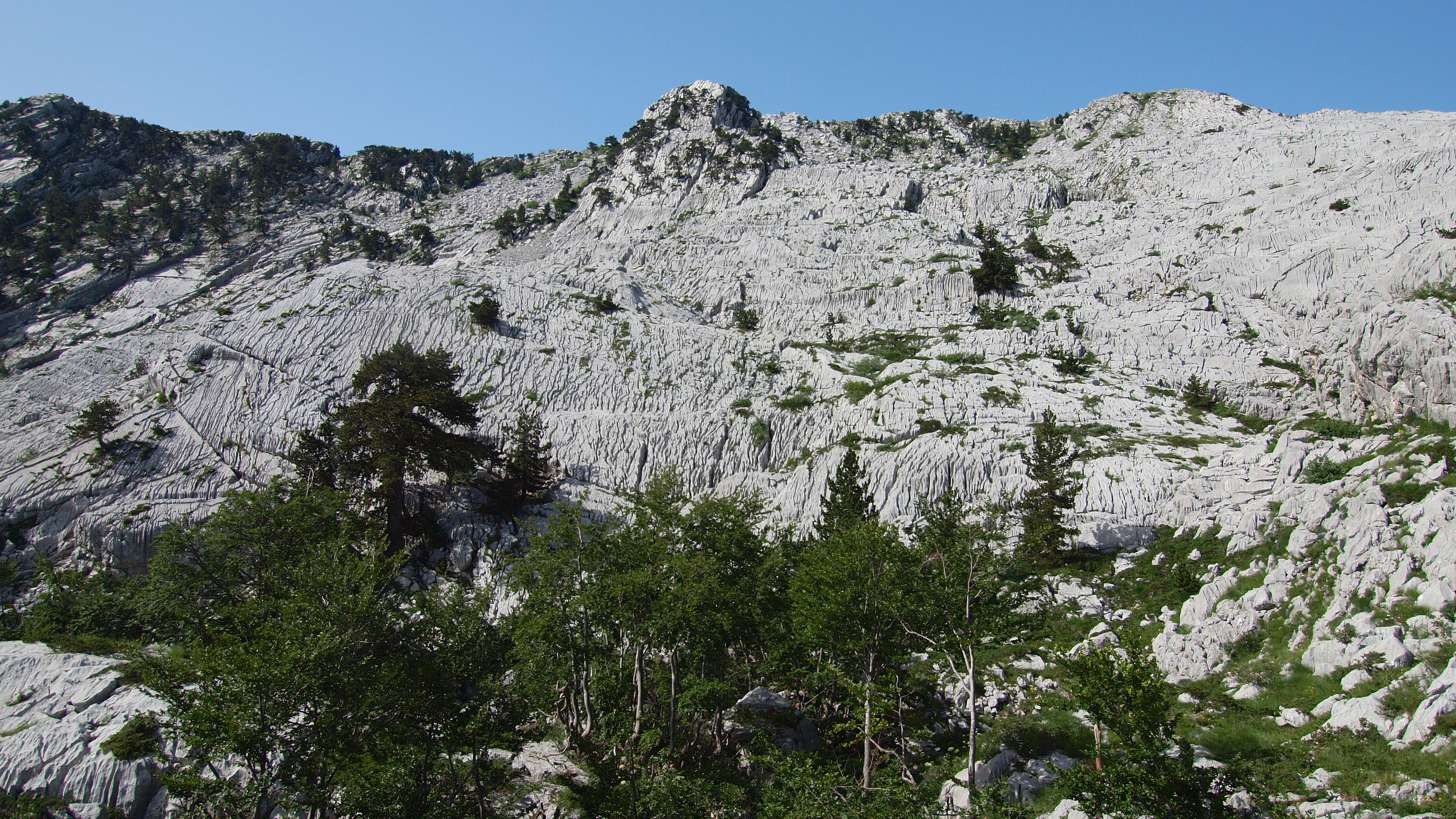

Highest point
- Elevation: 1,769 m (5,804 ft)
- Prominence: 350 m (1,150 ft)
- Coordinates: 42°34′39.6″N 18°35′11.4″E

Geography
- Location within Montenegro
- Location: Montenegro
- Parent range: Orjen

Reovačka greda (Serbian Cyrillic: Реовачка греда) is a ridge of Mount Orjen located in Krivošije, in southwestern Montenegro, separating the Bijela Gora plateau from the rest of the Orjen range. The ridge stretches for 17 kilometres from Vučji zub peak on the west, at the border of Montenegro and Bosnia and Herzegovina, and the villages of Crkvice and Malov Do on the east. Its highest peak is Pazua, which is 1,769 metres high.

Situated in the heavily karstified Orjen range, Reovačka greda consists mostly of limestone. Southern side of the ridge is used for trad climbing.
