= Unijerina =

Unijerina Унијерина
- Village
- Location of Unijerina in Montenegro
- Coordinates: 42°33′N 18°38′E
- Country: Montenegro
- Region: Coastal
- Municipality: Kotor

Population (2011)
  - Total: 9
- Time zone: UTC+1 (CET)
  - Summer (DST): UTC+2 (CEST)
- Area code: +382 32

Unijerina (Montenegrin: Унијерина) is a small hamlet in Krivošije microregion in southwestern Montenegro, located between the villages Crkvice and Knežlaz.

== Demographics ==
According to the 2011 census, the village had 9 inhabitants.
