= Comox Sandhills =

Sand dune system in British Columbia, Canada

Coordinates: 49.6850°N 124.8907°W

Comox Sandhills represents an ancient sand dune system in Comox and the Comox Valley Regional District near Cape Lazo, British Columbia. The dunes have been overgrown by a forest of Douglas-Fir and Shore Pine, which are frequently joined by Western Hemlock in moist areas. More rarely, kept uncommon by exceptionally low soil fertility, Western White Pine, Sitka Spruce, Western Red Cedar, Red Alder, Bigleaf Maple, Black Cottonwood and Trembling Aspen are present. Classic podzol soil profile development was the rule, mapped as the Kye-Custer complex ("Ky-Cu") in a 1959 survey; however, housing developments have since disturbed the area and disrupted soil profiles so that many of the soils no longer resemble podzols. As a result, a 1985 report mapped the Sandhills in a brunisolic (Kuhushan) soil association. A 1989 report mapped the Beddis series for drier parts and the Baynes series for imperfectly drained areas.

The Sandhills lie east-northeast of Comox town center. Most of Lazo Road east of the junction with Guthrie Road passes through the Sandhills. Housing developments along Kinnikinick Road, Sand Pines Drive and Sierra Pine Road are among those on the old dune system. The northeast boundary lies near and roughly parallel to Knight Road. Lazo Wildlife Park protects the northwest corner of the dune area.

Some of the low-lying areas in the Sandhills are prone to floods which can cause property damage.
