= Lasowski =

Lasowski is a surname. Notable people with the surname include:

- Elisa Lasowski (born 1986), British actor
- Vadzim Lasowski (born 1975), Belarusian footballer

== See also ==
- Laskowski
- Lazovsky (disambiguation)
- Eugene Lazowski (1913-2006), Polish doctor
