= Lazović =

Lazović (Serbo-Croatian Cyrillic: Лазовић, romanized: Lazović, lit. 'Son of Lazo', pronounced [lâːzoʋitɕ]) is a Serbian Orthodox and South Slavic-language surname originating from the Montenegrin clan of Kuči, Montenegro, the founder was Vuk Ljevak (Serbian Cyrillic: Вук Љевак) who had come to the Sekularac region in Kuči to maintain the peace among the Kuči tribes. The Kuči and Vasojevići clans had a blood feud (krvna osveta) which resulted in emigration to Šumadija, Peć (Metohija) and Herzegovina. The family of 50 houses in Metohija stayed until the 1999 war and then left for Serbia proper or Montenegro.

== Notable people ==
- Barbara Lazović (born 1988), Slovenian female handball player
- Danilo Lazović (1951–2006), Serbian actor
- Danko Lazović (born 1983), Serbian footballer
- Darko Lazović (born 1990), Serbian footballer
- Dejan Lazović (born 1990), water polo player
- Đorđe Lazović (born 1990), footballer
- Đorđe Lazović (born 1992), footballer
- Katarina Lazović (born 1999), Serbian female volleyball player
- Radomir Lazović (born 1980), politician and activist
- Suzana Lazović (born 1992), Montenegrin female handball player
- Tihana Lazović (born 1990), actress
- Vladimir Lazović (born 1954), Serbian writer
- Vuk Lazović (born 1988), Montenegrin handball player
- Olgivanna Lloyd Wright (1898–1985), maiden name Lazovich, headed an iconic architectural fellowship

== See also ==
- Lazovitsj is a Dutch-language common surname found in the Noord-Meierijs dialect of Eindhoven
- Lázovics is a Ugric-language common surname found in the Hungarian language
- Lazovich (Khanty and Mansi: Лазович) is a Ob Ugric-language common surname found in the Khanty and Mansi languages
- Lazovich (Arabic: لازوفيتش) is a common popular nickname found in Sanaani Arabic
