= Fort Stražnik =

- Tvrđava Stražnik / Crkvice Westfort
- near Crkvice, Montenegro

Site information
- Type: Fortification
- Controlled by: Montenegro
- Open to the public: yes
- Condition: Abandoned

Location
- Coordinates: 42°34′N 18°38′E

Site history
- Built by: Austro-Hungarian Empire
- Materials: Concrete, limestone
- Battles/wars: Krivošije Uprising; First World War

Fort Stražnik (Montenegrin: Tvrđava Stražnik, Тврђава Стражник, German: Crkvice Westfort), also known as the Eagle's Nest, is a former fortification of the Austro-Hungarian Empire located to the west of the village and former military base of Crkvice in southwestern Montenegro.

Together with Fort Kom, it was one of the two forts that were overlooking the southernmost Austro-Hungarian military base of Crkvice. Primary purpose of the fort was defence against the bordering Ottoman Empire.

== See also ==
- Krivošije
