= Ignaz Trollmann =

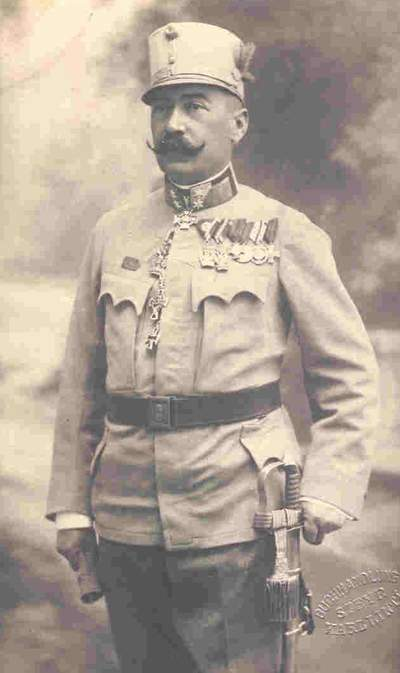
Ignaz Trollmann von Lovcenberg

Ignaz Trollmann von Lovcenberg (Steyr, 25 November 1860 – Graz, 23 February 1919), was a general in the Austro-Hungarian Army during World War I and commander of the 19th Corps.

== Biography ==
Trollmann became in 1880 an officer in the infantry, in 1887 General Staff Officer, in 1903 Colonel, and in 1910 Major General. In 1913 he became Field marshal lieutenant and commanded the 18th Infantry division at the outbreak of World War I.

In 1914, Trollmann participated at the head of his army division in the failed attack against Serbia. In 1915 he led the Combined Corps in the successful Gorlice–Tarnów Offensive against the Russians. He gained his greatest victory on 8–12 January 1916, when his 19th Corps stormed and took the heavily fortified and considered impregnable Mount Lovcen during the Montenegrin Campaign. He also took Cetinje a few days later.

After Montenegro's subjugation, Trollmann became in the same year General of the Infantry. In 1916–17, he remained in Albania on the Salonika front at the head of his 19th Army Corps. For taking Mount Lovcen, he was ennobled in 1917 as baron with the style of Freiherr Trollmann von Lovcenberg.

In October 1917 he was released from command of the 19th Corps and sent on leave. He received no new field command and retired from the Army at the end of the war. He died a few months later.
