= Tomo (disambiguation) =

Tomo is a Japanese given name.

Tomo may also refer to:

- Tomo River, Colombia
- Tomo, or tomo-hole – a New Zealand (originally Māori-language) name for a sinkhole
- Temporary open market operations (TOMO), an activity by a central bank to buy or sell government bonds on the open market
- tomo-, a prefix conveying the concept of cutting or slicing, as in "tomography"
