= Beddis (soil) =

Beddis soil series is a coarse, well to rapidly drained soil which occurs on eastern Vancouver Island and the adjacent Gulf Islands. Its parent material is eolian, fluvial or marine sand. The soil texture is usually loamy sand or sandy loam, but pure sand horizons may also be encountered. The usual soil classification is Orthic Dystric Brunisol. A Gleyed Humo-Ferric Podzol example is also known, although that profile does not have the eluvial (Ae or E) horizon characteristic of classic Podzol development.

A variant of Beddis series is found in the Comox Sandhills. In this area, well defined Ae (E) horizons are common in less disturbed areas and the B horizon may be locally cemented. Such soils look like classic Podzols and were mapped as such (Kye component of Kye-Custer complex) in 1959.
