= Lazo Wildlife Park =

Protected area in British Columbia, Canada

Coordinates: 49.693°N 124.895°W

Lazo Wildlife Park is a protected area on eastern Vancouver Island in the Comox Valley Regional District (CVRD). It lies at the north end of Lazo Marsh and its entrance is at the end of Sand Pines Drive in Comox. Part of the park lies on the Comox Sandhills in which the forest contains a large proportion of Shore Pine. Douglas-Fir, Western White Pine and Western Red Cedar are prominent among the other tree species present. Bird life is dominated by nesting populations of ducks and geese. Soils in the area were mapped in 1959 as Arrowsmith peat and Kye-Custer complex of rapidly to imperfectly drained sandy podzols.
