= Tomović =

Tomović (Cyrillic script: Томовић) is a Serbian patronymic surname derived from a masculine given name Tomo. It may refer to:

- Branko Tomović (born 1980), actor
- Dimitrije Tomović (born 1996), Serbian footballer
- Nenad Tomović (born 1987), footballer
- Rajko Tomović (1919–2001), scientist
- Vasilije Tomović (born 1906), chess master
