= Bojanić =

Bojanić (Serbian: Бојанић) is a South-Slavic patronymic surname, derived from the given name Bojan. It may refer to:

- Darijan Bojanić (born 1994), Swedish footballer
- Dragomir Bojanić (1933–1993), Serbian actor
- Ines Bojanić, Croatian actress
- Milenko Bojanić (1924–1987), Yugoslav politician and university professor
- Miloš Bojanić (born 1950), Bosnian turbo folk singer
  - Bane Bojanić, Bosnian singer and son of Miloš
  - Mikica Bojanić, Bosnian singer and son of Miloš
- Mladen Bojanić (born 1962), Montenegrin economist and politician
- Zoran Bojanić (born 1959), Serbian politician
