= Fort Kom =

- Tvrđava Kom / Ostfort Crkvice
- near Crkvice, Montenegro
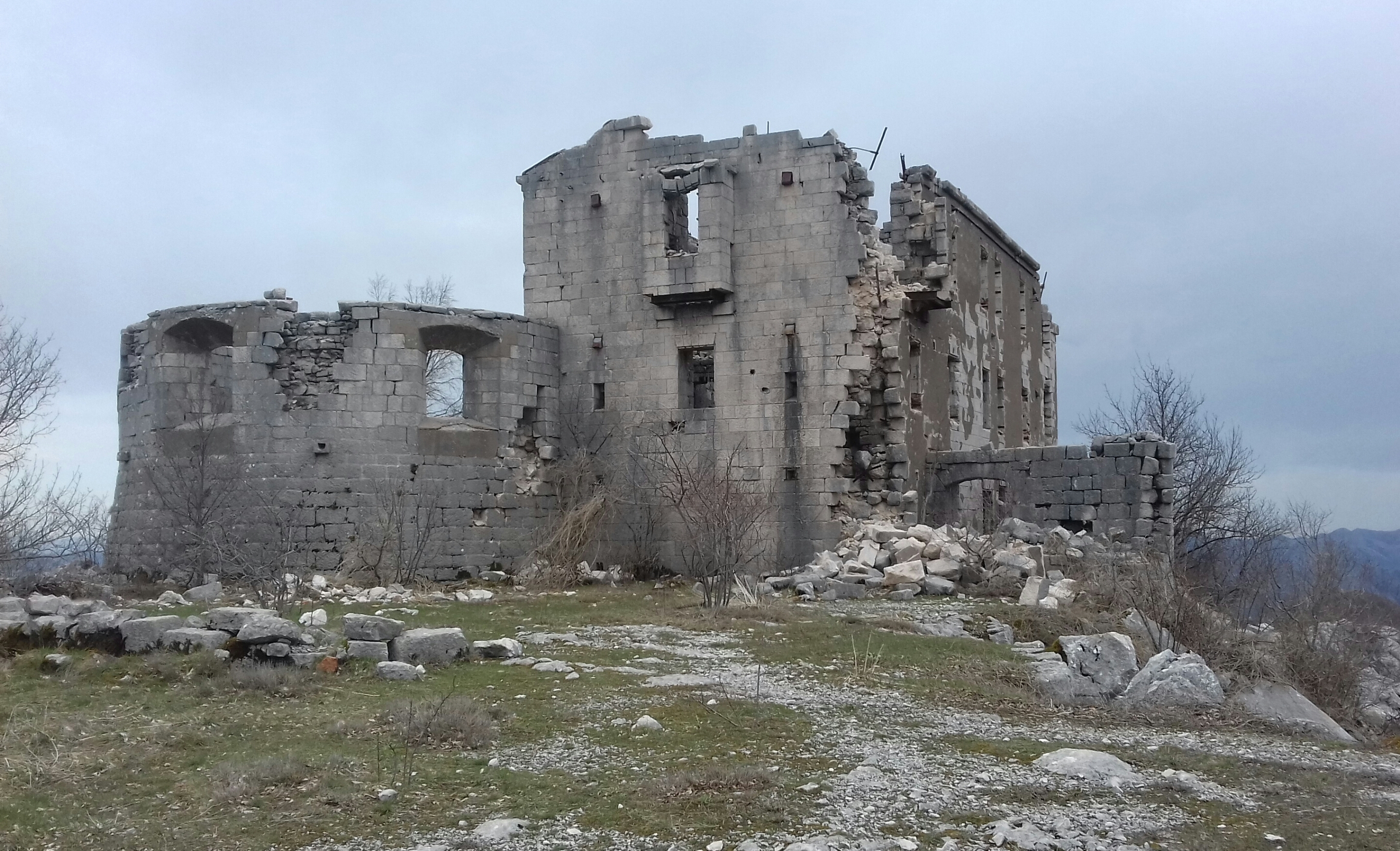

Site information
- Type: Fortification
- Controlled by: Montenegro
- Open to the public: yes
- Condition: Abandoned

Location
- Coordinates: 42°34′N 18°38′E

Site history
- Built: 1882-83
- Built by: Austro-Hungarian Empire
- Materials: Concrete, limestone
- Battles/wars: First World War

Garrison information
- Garrison: 3 officers, 59 soldiers

Fort Kom (Montenegrin: Tvrđava Kom, Тврђава Ком, German: Ostfort Crkvice) is a former fortification of the Austro-Hungarian Empire located to the east of the village and former military base of Crkvice in southwestern Montenegro. Together with Fort Stražnik, it was one of the two forts that were overlooking the southernmost Austro-Hungarian military base of Crkvice.

Built in 1882 and 1883, after the Second Krivošije Uprising, the primary purpose of the fort was defence against the bordering Ottoman Empire, by controlling the Crkvice area and the roads leading to the plateau from the north and east. Fort Kom was built according to general design by colonel Karl Wahlberg.

== See also ==
- Krivošije
