= Radojičić =

Radojičić (Serbian Cyrillic: Радојичић, pronounced [radǒjitʃitɕ]) is a Serbo-Croatian surname. Notable people with the surname include:

- Dragan Radojičić (born 1970), Montenegrin football manager and former player
- Gabrijel Radojičić (born 1973), former French-born Serbian footballer
- Igor Radojičić (born 1966), former President of the National Assembly of Republika Srpska
- Milan Radojičić (born 1970), former Serbian footballer
- Marija Radojičić (born 1992), Serbian footballer
- Nikola Radojičić (born 1992), Serbian footballer
- Nikola Radojičić (basketball) (born 1986), Serbian basketballer
- Nina Radojičić (born 1989), Serbian singer
- Radojica Radojičić (born ?), Croatian football manager
- Petar Radojičić (born 1994), Serbian basketballer
