= Baynes (soil) =

Baynes soil series is an imperfectly drained soil which occurs on eastern Vancouver Island and the adjacent Gulf Islands. Its parent material is eolian, fluvial or marine sand. The soil texture is usually loamy sand or sandy loam, but pure sand horizons may also be encountered. It is classified as Gleyed Dystric Brunisol or Gleyed Humo-Ferric Podzol.

Most of its occurrences were mapped as Bowser series in 1959. These soils usually have a shallow dark reddish brown Ah horizon, no eluvial (A_{2}, Ae or E) horizon, and a reddish brown Bm or Bf which starts to be gleyed below about 55 cm (22 in). They support a second-growth forest of Douglas-fir, western red cedar, western hemlock, red alder and bigleaf maple except where cleared for agriculture or urban development.

Swales in the Comox Sandhills are mapped as Baynes series, but undisturbed soils there have an eluvial horizon up to 10 cm (3.9 in) thick which produces a classic podzol profile. The vegetation is dominated by shore pine and western hemlock, and the soils were formerly in the Custer series.
