= Lazo (surname) =

Lazo is a surname. Notable people with the surname include:

- Agustín Lazo Adalid (1896–1971), Mexican artist and playwright
- Alec Lazo, Cuban-American dancer, instructor, and choreographer
- Ezequiel Lazo (born 1989), Argentine footballer
- Gabe Lazo (born 1984), American basketball coach
- Lucas Lazo (born 1989), Argentine footballer
- Nicolás Lazo (born 1995), Argentine volleyball player
- Pedro Luis Lazo (born 1973), Cuban baseball player
- Ralph Lazo (1924–1992), American civil rights activist
- Sergey Lazo (1894–1920), Moldovan revolutionary
