= Lazovsky =

Lazovsky (masculine), Lazovskaya (feminine), or Lazovskoye (neuter) may refer to:

- Maxim Lazovsky (1965–2000), Russian KGB officer
- Lazovsky District, a district of Primorsky Krai, Russia

== See also ==
- Eugene Lazowski (1913-2006), a Polish doctor
- Lasowski (disambiguation)
- Lazo (disambiguation)
