= Tomo =

- Language: Japanese

Origin
- Origin: Japan
- Meaning: Different meanings depending on the kanji used

Other names
- Variant forms: Tomoe, Tomoka, Tomoko

Tomo (written: 友, 智, or 耳) is a Japanese unisex given name. It is also a masculine given name in Croatia, Macedonia, Serbia, and Slovenia. Notable people with the name include:

== Given name ==
- Tomo Gluić (born 1983), Croatian footballer
- Tomo Križnar (born 1954), Slovenian activist
- Tomo Matsumoto (マツモト トモ), Japanese shōjo manga artist
- Tomo Milinović (1770–1846), Serbian writer and revolutionary
- Tomo Morimoto (森本 友; born 1983), Japanese long-distance runner
- Tomo in der Mühlen (born 1961), German/Croatian DJ/producer
- Tomo Muranaka (村中 知; born 1989), Japanese voice actress
- Tomo Riba (1937–2000), Indian politician
- Tomo Sugawara (菅原 智; born 1976), Japanese footballer
- Tomo Virk (born 1960), Slovene literary historian and essayist
- Tomo Vladimirski (Томо Владамирски, 1904–1971), Macedonian painter
- Tomo Yasuda (fl. 2003–present), Japanese-American electronic musician
- Tomo no Yoshio (伴善男), 9th century Japanese court counsellor
- Tomo Zdelarić (c. 1531–1572), earliest Jesuit priest from the Habsburg Kingdom of Slavonia

== Nickname ==
- Sutomo (1920–1981), former Indonesian minister and National Hero of Indonesia, colloquially called "Bung Tomo" (Comrade Tomo) among Indonesians
- Tomislav "Tomo" Buzov (1940–1993)
- Tomislav Tomo Česen (born 1959), Slovenian mountaineer
- Tomislav Maretić (1854–1938), Croatian linguist and lexicographer
- Tomo Miličević (born 1979), American lead guitarist of the alternative rock band 30 Seconds to Mars
- Tomo Ohka (大家 友和; born 1976), Japanese baseball pitcher
- Tom Osander, referred to as "Tomo", drummer in the bands of Damien Rice and Lisa Hannigan
- Tomislav Tomo Šokota (born 1977), Croatian retired footballer

== Ring name ==
- Tomo Michinoku, ring name of Tomoka Nakagawa (born 1981), Japanese professional wrestler

== Surname ==
- Angele Tomo (born 1989), Cameroonian freestyle wrestler
- Taite Te Tomo (1883–1939), Maori politician in New Zealand

== Fictional characters ==
- Tomo Aizawa, title protagonist from the manga/anime miniseries Tomo-chan Is a Girl!
- Tomo Atena, from the video game Inazuma Eleven
- Tomo Ebizuka (海老塚智), a main character in Girls Band Cry
- Tomo Takino, from the manga series Azumanga Daioh
