= Vučurović =

Vučurović (Serbian Cyrillic: Вучуровић) is a Montenegrin and Serbian surname. It may refer to:

- Maja Vučurović (born 1991), Serbian female basketballer
- Nikola Vučurović (born 1980), Montenegrin basketballer
