= Ivan Laskovsky =

Russian composer and pianist (1799–1855)

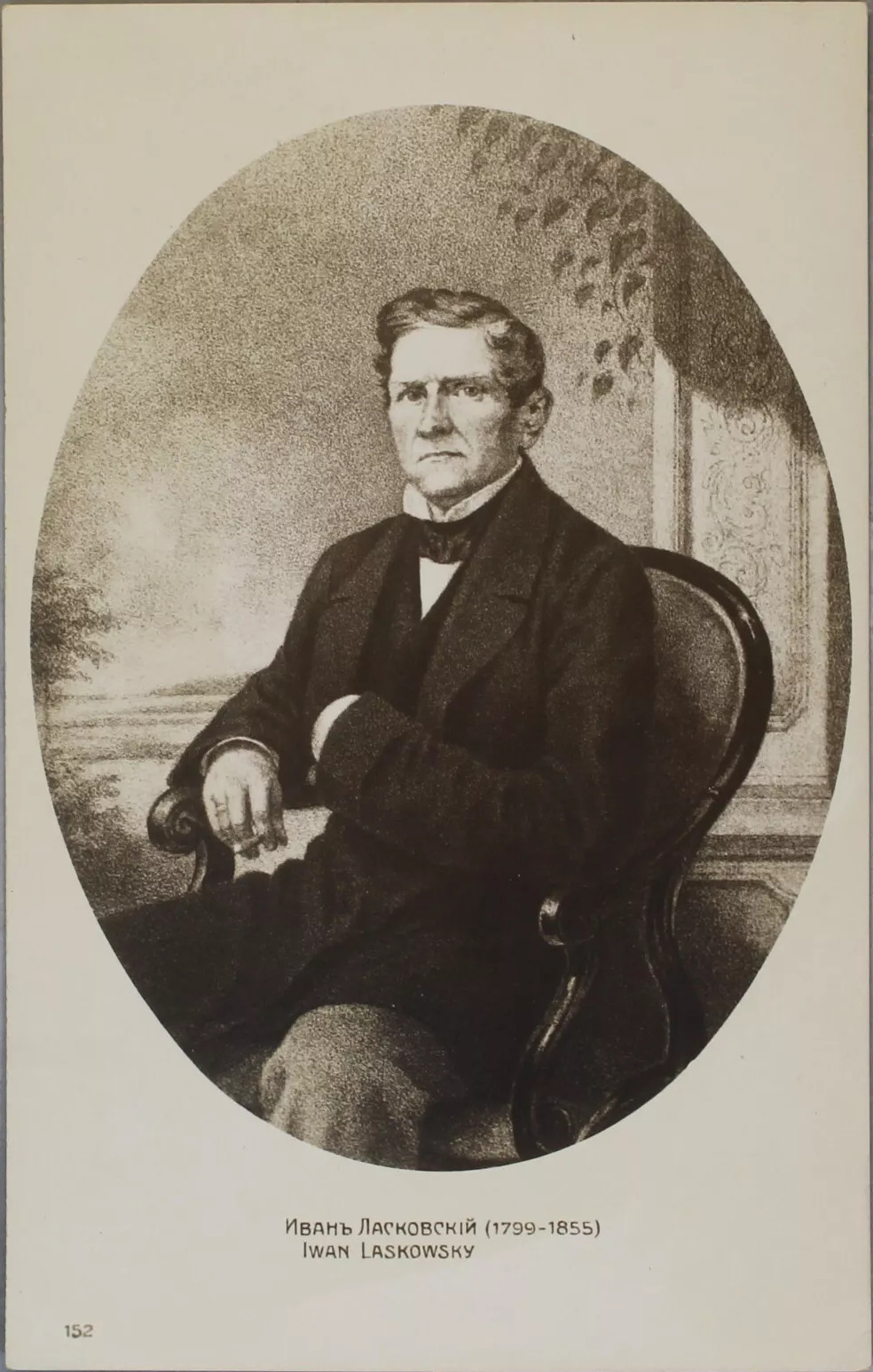
Ivan Laskovsky, author unknown.

Ivan Fyodorovich Laskovsky (Russian: Иван Фёдорович Ласковский, 13 October 1799 – 12 December 1855) was a Russian pianist and composer of the Romantic era.

== Biography ==
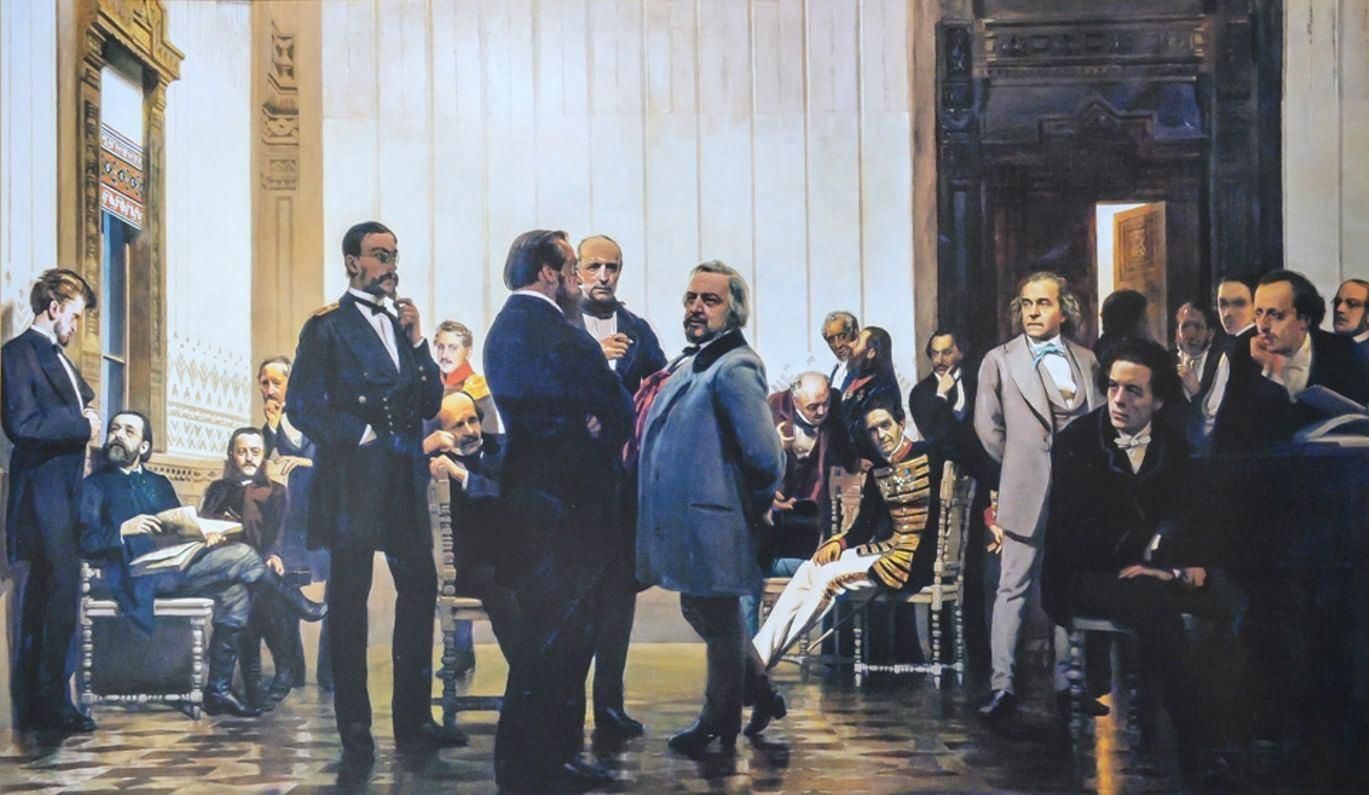
In the painting Slavic Composers by Ilya Repin, Ivan Laskovsky is depicted in military uniform, behind Dargomyzhsky, who is sitting on the chair in the middle of the painting.

Ivan Laskovsky was born on 13 October 1799 in Saint Petersburg. His father was a Russified Pole, while his mother was Russian. By the age of eight he could play fairly difficult pieces on the piano. He received his education at a private boarding school. Laskovsky served in the Preobrazhensky Life Guards Regiment from 1817 until 1832. After retiring he became an officer at the Ministry of War. He was a student of John Field and studied theory with Johann Konrad Friedrich Haberzettel, despite this, he did not receive complete music education. The pianist was highly regarded. He was close friends with Mikhail Glinka, Alexander Dargomyzhsky, Vladimir Odoyevsky, and Mikhail Vielgorsky. Ivan Laskovsky died on 12 December 1855 in the city.

== Works ==
Laskovsky composed more than a hundred piano works. His first works, which included ecossaises, mazurkas, and waltzes, were published in the journal La Harpe du Nord (Saint Petersburg, 1822–25). In 1832, Laskovsky, with Nikolai Norov, published four pieces of his (a nocturne, a waltz, a scherzo, and a contradance), the music of Mikhail Glinka, Alexander Griboyedov, and Norov. Laskovsk published little compositions during his lifetime: it was only after his death that 78 of his pieces (six notebooks) were published in two volumes, edited by Mily Balakirev. The composer wrote 22 mazurkas and 13 waltzes.

His complete works were also published in Petrograd. His style can be compared to Chopin and Field. Laskovsky composed four string quartets, with the last remaining unfinished. The third string quartet in G minor was published in 1947. The rest still remains in manuscript and are stored in the Rimsky-Korsakov Saint Petersburg State Conservatory. He also wrote a trio, a tarantella for orchestra, and other works.
