= Knežlaz =

Knežlaz Кнежлаз
- Village
- Location of Knežlaz in Montenegro
- Coordinates: 42°32′N 18°40′E
- Country: Montenegro
- Region: Coastal
- Municipality: Kotor

Population (2011)
  - Total: 26
- Time zone: UTC+1 (CET)
  - Summer (DST): UTC+2 (CEST)
- Area code: +382 32

Knežlaz (Montenegrin: Кнежлаз) is a village in Krivošije microregion in southwestern Montenegro, north of the coastal town of Risan. According to the 2011 census, the village had 26 inhabitants.

The village is notable as the location of the signing of the peace agreement between the rebelled Krivošije clan and Austria-Hungary on 11 January 1870, which put an end to the Krivošije uprising of 1869.

== See also ==
- Krivošije
- Krivošije uprising
