= Lucas Lazo =

Argentine footballer

Lucas Lazo (born January 31, 1989, in Rosario, Argentina) is an Argentine association football player as a midfielder currently playing for Central Córdoba Santiago del Estero, on loan from Rosario Central of the Argentine Primera División.

== Teams ==
- (Argentina) Rosario Central 2010-
- (Argentina) → Central Córdoba (loan) 2011–2012
- (Argentina) → Central Córdoba (SdE) (loan) 2015-

== Personal life ==
He is the brother of the O'Higgins's player Ezequiel Lazo.
