= Erwin Laskowski =

German World War II fighter pilot (1914–1983)

- Born: 27 May 1914; Bochum
- Died: 13 October 1983 (aged 69); Bochum
- Military career
- Allegiance: Nazi Germany
- Branch: Luftwaffe
- Service years: 1936–1945
- Rank: Oberfeldwebel
- Units: JG 51; JG 11
- Conflicts: World War II: Eastern Front; Defence of the Reich
- Awards: Knight's Cross of the Iron Cross

Erwin Laskowski (27 May 1914 – 13 October 1983) was a German Luftwaffe ace and recipient of the Knight's Cross of the Iron Cross during World War II. The Knight's Cross of the Iron Cross, and its variants were the highest awards in the military and paramilitary forces of Nazi Germany during World War II. During his career Erwin Laskowsky was credited with 46 aerial victories in 300+ missions.

== Early life and career ==
Laskowski was born on 27 May 1914 in Bochum in the Province of Westphalia, a province of the Kingdom of Prussia within the German Empire. In November 1936, he joined the Luftwaffe, initially serving with the Flak-Regiment 4, an anti-aircraft artillery regiment. In November 1939, Laskowski began flight training at the Jagdfliegerschule 5, the fighter pilot school at Wien-Schwechat, and later from June 1941 in Magdeburg. Following flight and fighter pilot training, (Note: Flight training in the Luftwaffe progressed through the levels A1, A2 and B1, B2, referred to as A/B flight training. A training included theoretical and practical training in aerobatics, navigation, long-distance flights and dead-stick landings. The B courses included high-altitude flights, instrument flights, night landings and training to handle the aircraft in difficult situations.) he was posted to Ergänzungsgruppe, a supplementary training unit, of Jagdgeschwader 52 (JG 52—52nd Fighter Wing) in August 1941. In November 1941, Laskowski was transferred to 2. Staffel (2nd squadron) of Jagdgeschwader 51 (JG 51—51st Fighter Wing).

== World War II ==
On 8 January 1942, Laskowski made an emergency landing in his Messerschmitt Bf 109 F-2 (Werknummer 8115—factory number) at Dno.

=== In defense of the Reich ===
On 11 January 1944, the United States Army Air Forces (USAAF) VIII Bomber Command, later renamed Eighth Air Force, attacked German aircraft manufacturing at Halberstadt, Magdeburg, Oschersleben and Braunschweig. In total 663 heavy bombers, escorted by 592 fighter aircraft were dispatched. III. Gruppe of JG 11 engaged the USAAF bombers in the area west of Hildesheim. In this encounter, Laskowski claimed a Boeing B-17 Flying Fortress bomber shot down, his first heavy bomber.

On 18 March, the USAAF Eighth Air Force sent 738 heavy bombers on a mission against German aircraft manufacturing and the Luftwaffe airfields at Munich and Friedrichshafen. JG 11 intercepted a formation of Consolidated B-24 Liberator bombers from the 14th Combat Bombardment Wing south of Freiburg after the attack on Friedrichshafen. JG 11 pilots claimed 19 B-24s shot down, including two by Laskowski.

On 30 May, the USAAF again targeted German aircraft manufacturing and the Luftwaffe airfields. The Eighth Air Force dispatched 928 heavy bombers and their fighter escort to factories at Dessau, Halberstadt and Oschersleben. In parallel the airfields at Oldenburg and Rotenburg an der Wümme were hit. JG 11 intercepted bombers of the 1st Bombardment Division (1 BD) which targeted German aircraft manufacturing. In this aerial battle, Laskowski claimed one bomber shot down. JG 11 records list this claim as a B-24 bomber. However, 1 BD exclusively operated the B-17.

In April 1945, Laskowski was awarded the Knight's Cross of the Iron Cross (Ritterkreuz des Eisernen Kreuzes).

== Later life ==
Laskowski died on 13 October 1983 at the age of 69 in his hometown Bochum, West Germany.

== Summary of career ==
=== Aerial victory claims ===
According to Obermaier, Laskowski was credited with 46 aerial victories claimed in over 300 combat missions. This figure includes 25 claims on the Eastern Front and 21 on the Western Front, among them 15 heavy bombers. Mathews and Foreman, authors of Luftwaffe Aces — Biographies and Victory Claims, researched the German Federal Archives and found records for 15 aerial victory claims. This figure includes ten aerial victories on the Eastern Front and five heavy bombers over the Western Allies.

Victory claims were logged to a map-reference (PQ = Planquadrat), for example "PQ 47361". The Luftwaffe grid map (Jägermeldenetz) covered all of Europe, western Russia and North Africa and was composed of rectangles measuring 15 minutes of latitude by 30 minutes of longitude, an area of about 360 square miles (930 km^{2}). These sectors were then subdivided into 36 smaller units to give a location area 3 km × 4 km (1.9 mi × 2.5 mi) in size.

Chronicle of aerial victories
This and the – (dash) indicates unconfirmed aerial victory claims for which Laskowski did not receive credit. This and the ? (question mark) indicates information discrepancies listed by Prien, Stemmer, Rodeike, Balke, Bock, Mathews and Foreman.
| Claim | Date | Time | Type | Location | Claim | Date | Time | Type | Location |
– 1. Staffel of Jagdgeschwader 51 "Mölders" – Eastern Front — January – 30 April 1942
| 1 | 1 April 1942 | 17:45 | R-5 | Machulishchy | 3 | 27 April 1942 | 19:01 | Pe-2 | 7 km (4.3 mi) southeast of Kulakowo |
| 2 | 4 April 1942 | 12:52 | Il-2 | south of Wswad | | | | | |
– 1. Staffel of Jagdgeschwader 51 "Mölders" – Eastern Front — 1 May 1942 – 3 February 1943
| 4 | 2 May 1942 | 19:03 | Pe-2 | 12 km (7.5 mi) southeast of Soltsy | 8 | 14 November 1942 | 10:02 | LaGG-3 | PQ 47361; 30 km (19 mi) west-northwest of Staritsa |
| 5 | 20 July 1942 | 08:35 | LaGG-3 | vicinity of Weretejka | 9 | 14 November 1942 | 10:07 | LaGG-3 | PQ 47832; 20 km (12 mi) east of Zubtsov |
| 6 | 20 July 1942 | 08:37 | LaGG-3 | vicinity of Weretejka | 10 | 15 January 1943 | 13:12 | La-5 | PQ 07672 |
| 7 | 9 November 1942 | 13:40 | LaGG-3 | PQ 26182; 40 km (25 mi) west of Beloi | | | | | |
– 7. Staffel of Jagdgeschwader 11 – Defense of the Reich — 1 January – 31 May 1944
| 11 | 11 January 1944 | 11:40 | B-17 | | ? (Note: This claim is not listed by Mathews and Foreman.) | 15 April 1944 | — | P-38 | |
| — | 8 March 1944 | 12:05 | B-17 | | 14 | 12 May 1944 | 12:28 | B-17 | PQ 05 Ost S/QQ, north of Wiesbaden |
| 12 | 18 March 1944 | 15:05 | B-24 | PQ 04 Ost N/ER, east of Freiburg | ? | 22 May 1944 | — | B-17 | |
| 13 | 18 March 1944 | 15:07 | B-24 | PQ 04 Ost N/ER, east of Freiburg | 15 | 28 May 1944 | 14:15 | B-17 | PQ 15 Ost S/HC/HD, Magdeburg |
| — | 8 April 1944 | — | B-24 | | ? | 29 May 1944 | — | P-47 | |
| ? | 15 April 1944 | — | P-38 | | ? | 30 May 1944 | — | B-24 | |
– 11. Staffel of Jagdgeschwader 11 "Mölders" – Eastern Front — June – September 1944
According to Prien and Rodeike, Laskowski claimed four undocumented aerial victories on the Eastern Front. These claims are not mentioned by Mathews and Foreman.

=== Awards ===
- Iron Cross (1939)
  - 2nd Class (25 May 1942)
  - 1st Class (15 November 1942)
- Wound Badge (1939)
  - in Black (19 June 1943)
- German Cross in Gold on 1 January 1945 as Oberfeldwebel in the 8./Jagdgeschwader 11
- Knight's Cross of the Iron Cross on 27 April 1945 as Oberfeldwebel and pilot in the 8./Jagdgeschwader 11
