= Milan Radojičić =

Serbian footballer (born 1970)

Personal information
- Date of birth: 26 October 1970 (age 56)
- Height: 1.85 m (6 ft 1 in)
- Position: Forward

Senior career*
Years	Team	Apps	(Gls)
- Zvezdara
–1998	Radnički Pirot		
1998–1999	Železničar Lajkovac		
1999–2000	Milicionar	34	(11)
2001	Torpedo-ZIL	8	(2)
- * Club domestic league appearances and goals

Milan Radojičić (Serbian Cyrillic: Милан Радојичић; born 26 October 1970) is a Serbian retired football player.

Radojičić played with Serbian clubs FK Zvezdara, FK Radnički Pirot and FK Železničar Lajkovac before joining FK Milicionar in 1999 and playing the 1999–2000 First League of FR Yugoslavia. Next he moved to Russia and played with FC Torpedo-ZIL Moscow.
