= Ezequiel Lazo =

Argentine footballer

Personal information
- Full name: Ezequiel Alberto Lazo Benítez
- Date of birth: 31 January 1989 (age 37)
- Place of birth: Rosario, Argentina
- Height: 1.75 m (5 ft 9 in)
- Position: Striker

Youth career
- Defensores Unidos
- 2008–2010: Rosario Central

Senior career*
Years	Team	Apps	(Gls)
2010–2011	Rosario Central	6	(0)
2011	Central Córdoba	–	(–)
2011–2013	O'Higgins	2	(1)
2012	→ Defensores de Belgrano (loan)	15	(2)
2012	→ Central Córdoba (loan)	17	(3)
2013	→ Tiro Federal (loan)	9	(2)
2014	Deportivo Merlo	6	(0)
2015	El Porvenir del Norte	–	(–)
2016	Sportivo Las Parejas	8	(1)
2017	El Porvenir del Norte	–	(–)
2022–2023	Belgrano de Arequito	–	(–)
2023–2024	Coronel Aguirre	10	(9)
- * Club domestic league appearances and goals

Ezequiel Alberto Lazo Benítez (born 31 January 1989) is an Argentine football striker.

== Teams ==
- (Argentina) Rosario Central 2010–2011
- (Argentina) Central Córdoba de Rosario 2011
- (Chile) O'Higgins 2011
- (Argentina) Defensores de Belgrano 2012
- (Argentina) Central Córdoba de Rosario 2012
- (Argentina) Tiro Federal 2013
- (Chile) O'Higgins 2013
- (Argentina) Deportivo Merlo 2014
- (Argentina) El Porvenir del Norte 2015
- (Argentina) Sportivo Las Parejas 2016
- (Argentina) El Porvenir del Norte 2017
- (Argentina) Belgrano de Arequito 2022–2023
- (Argentina) Coronel Aguirre 2023–2024

== Personal life ==
He is the brother of the Rosario Central's player Lucas Lazo.
