= Tomo Zdelarić =

- Born: 1531; Lupoglav, Dugo Selo, Kingdom of Slavonia
- Died: April 8, 1572 (aged 40–41); Vilnius, Grand Duchy of Lithuania
- Other names: Toma Zdelario, Thomas Zdelaric
- Occupation: Jesuit
- Known for: the earliest Jesuit from Slavonia

Tomo Zdelarić (Latin: Zdjelaritius Sclavus, Thomas Sclavus, Thomas Sdelaritius Illyricus) (c. 1531 – 8 April 1572) was the earliest Jesuit from Habsburg Kingdom of Slavonia. According to Vanino, Zdelarić also referred to himself as Illyrus.

Zdelarić was born in Lupoglav, Dugo Selo around 1531. Zdelarić became a Jesuit in 1554. He was lecturer of the philosophy at the Jesuit college in Vilnius.

Zdelaric died in Vilnius on 8 April 1572 in a plague.

== Sources ==
- Fine, John V. A. (5 February 2010). When Ethnicity Did Not Matter in the Balkans: A Study of Identity in Pre-Nationalist Croatia, Dalmatia, and Slavonia in the Medieval and Early-Modern Periods. University of Michigan Press. ISBN 978-0-472-02560-2.
- Bratulić, Josip; Kosić, Ivan (2003). Hrvati predavači na inozemnim (sve)učilištima. Nacionalna i Sveučilišna Knjižnica. ISBN 978-953-500-011-2.
- Baranova, Jurate (2000). Lithuanian Philosophy: Persons and Ideas. CRVP. ISBN 978-1-56518-137-3.
- Roman Darowski (1999). Studies in the philosophy of the Jesuits in Poland in the 16th to 18th centuries. "Ignatianum", School of Philosophy and Education. ISBN 978-83-88209-03-1.
