= Alava, Ștefan Vodă =

Alava Алава (Russian) Алава (Ukrainian)
- Commune
- Location within Moldova
- Coordinates: 46°30′34″N 29°33′55″E
- Country: Moldova

Government
  - Mayor: Sîvac Veaceslav (PCRM)

Area
  - Total: 17.23 km^{2} (6.65 sq mi)
- Elevation: 163 m (535 ft)

Population (2014)
  - Total: 420
- Time zone: UTC+2 (EET)
  - Summer (DST): UTC+3 (EEST)
- Postal code: MD-4211

Alava is a commune in Ștefan Vodă District, Moldova. It is composed of two villages, Alava and Lazo.
