= Šekularac =

Šekularac (Serbian Cyrillic: Шекуларац) is a Serbian surname originating from Berane, Montenegro of the Vasojevići Serbian clan. The founder was Petar Šekularac. It may refer to:

- Ana Šekularac (born 1974), Serbian fashion designer
- Dragoslav Šekularac (born 1937), Serbian footballer
- Kristian Šekularac (born 2003), Swiss footballer
- Mladen Šekularac (born 1981), Montenegrin basketball player
