= Zoran Bojanić =

Serbian politician (born 1959)

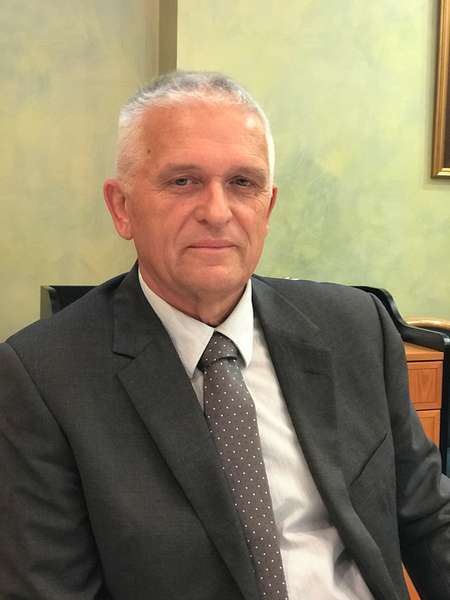
Zoran Bojanić

Zoran Bojanić (Serbian Cyrillic: Зоран Бојанић; born 26 February 1959) is a politician in Serbia. He has served in the National Assembly of Serbia since 2012 as a member of the Serbian Progressive Party.

== Early life and career ==
Bojanić was born in Kraljevo, in what was then the People's Republic of Serbia in the Federal People's Republic of Yugoslavia. He trained as an economist and subsequently worked for Telekom Srbija. He had a successful battle with leukemia between 2010 and 2013; Politika interviewed him on the subject after his recovery.

== Politician ==
=== Municipal politics ===
Bojanić was president of the Progressive Party's local board in Kraljevo in 2013 and 2014. He resigned from the position in June 2014 against the backdrop of a disagreement between the local and national party organizations over Kraljevo mayor Dragan Jovanović.

He received the second position on the party's electoral list for the Kraljevo city assembly in the 2012 Serbian local elections and was elected when the list won sixteen mandates. He was not a candidate at the local level in 2016, but he received the sixth position on the party's list in the 2020 local elections and was re-elected to the city assembly when the list won forty-six mandates.

=== Parliamentarian ===
Bojanić was first elected to the national assembly in the 2012 Serbian parliamentary election; he received the seventieth position on the Progressive Party's Let's Get Serbia Moving list and was elected when the list won seventy-three mandates. The Progressive Party subsequently formed a coalition government with the Socialist Party of Serbia and other parties, and Bojanić served as part of the government's parliamentary majority.

He was re-elected in the 2014 and 2016 elections, both of which were won by the Progressive Party and its allies. During the 2016–20 parliament, Bojanić was a member of the committee on the economy, regional development, trade, tourism, and energy; a member of the committee on finance, the state budget, and control of public spending; a deputy member of the committee for the diaspora and Serbs in the region;; the leader of the parliamentary friendship group with Canada; and a member of the friendship groups to Belarus, Ghana, Italy, Kazakhstan, Montenegro, Russia, Slovenia, and Switzerland.

Bojanić received the 118th position on the Progressive Party's Aleksandar Vučić — For Our Children list in the 2020 parliamentary election and was elected to a fourth term when the list won a landslide majority with 188 mandates. He continues to serve on the finance committee and lead Serbia's parliamentary friendship group with Canada, and he is a member of the committee on spatial planning, transport, infrastructure, and telecommunications; a deputy member of the health and family committee; a member of the subcommittee for the consideration of reports on audits conducted by the state audit institution; and a member of the parliamentary friendship groups with Italy, Slovenia, and Switzerland.
