= Subotić =

Subotić (Serbian Cyrillic: Суботић, pronounced [sǔbotitɕ]) is a South Slavic surname. Notable people with the surname include:

- Dejan Subotić (1852–1920), Serbo-Russian general
- Ana Subotić (born 1983), Serbian long-distance runner
- Bojan Subotić (born 1990), Serbian basketball player
- Danijel Subotić (born 1989), Swiss footballer
- Jovan Subotić (1817–1886), Serbian lawyer, writer and politician
- Mitar Subotić (1961–1999), Serbian musician
- Neven Subotić (born 1988), Serbian footballer
- Slobodan Subotić (born 1956), Slovenian basketball player
- Stanko Subotić (born 1959), Serbian businessman
- Vasilije Subotić (born 2008), Serbian footballer

== See also ==
- Subotica
