= Lazo, Russia =

Name of several rural localities in Russia

Lazo (Russian: Лазо) is the name of several rural localities in Russia.

Modern inhabited localities

- Lazo, Kamchatka Krai, a settlement in Milkovsky District of Kamchatka Krai
- Lazo, Dalnerechensk, Primorsky Krai, a selo under the administrative jurisdiction of the town of Dalnerechensk, Primorsky Krai
- Lazo, Lazovsky District, Primorsky Krai, a selo in Lazovsky District of Primorsky Krai

Abolished inhabited localities

- Lazo, Sakha Republic, a former settlement in the Sakha Republic; abolished on March 21, 2001
