= Tomasz Laskowski =

Polish footballer

Personal information
- Date of birth: 17 December 1984 (age 41)
- Place of birth: Ruda Śląska, Poland
- Height: 1.89 m (6 ft 2 in)
- Position: Goalkeeper

Senior career*
Years	Team	Apps	(Gls)
2003–2009	Górnik Zabrze	8	(0)
2004	→ Lechia Zielona Góra (loan)		
2005	→ GKS Katowice (loan)	0	(0)
2005	→ Świt NDM (loan)	5	(0)
2008	Kmita Zabierzów	14	(0)
2009	Raków Częstochowa	19	(0)
2010	Polonia Słubice	20	(0)
2011–2012	Miedź Legnica	4	(0)
2013–2016	Bytovia Bytów	27	(0)
2016–2020	Warta Poznań	38	(0)
2020–2022	Warta Międzychód	45	(0)
- * Club domestic league appearances and goals

Tomasz Laskowski (born 17 December 1984) is a Polish former professional footballer who played as a goalkeeper.
