= Malov Do =

Malov Do Малов До
- Village
- Location of Malov Do in Montenegro
- Coordinates: 42°34′N 18°38′E
- Country: Montenegro
- Region: Coastal
- Municipality: Kotor

Population (2011)
  - Total: 8
- Time zone: UTC+1 (CET)
  - Summer (DST): UTC+2 (CEST)
- Area code: +382 32

Malov Do (Montenegrin Cyrillic: Малов До) is a village in Krivošije in southwestern Montenegro, located near the former settlement and Austro-Hungarian military base of Crkvice. According to the 2011 census, the village had 8 inhabitants. The village church, Church of the Nativity of the Virgin Mary, was built in 1831.
