= Krivošije uprising (1869) =

Internal conflict in the Austro-Hungarian Empire

Krivošije Uprising
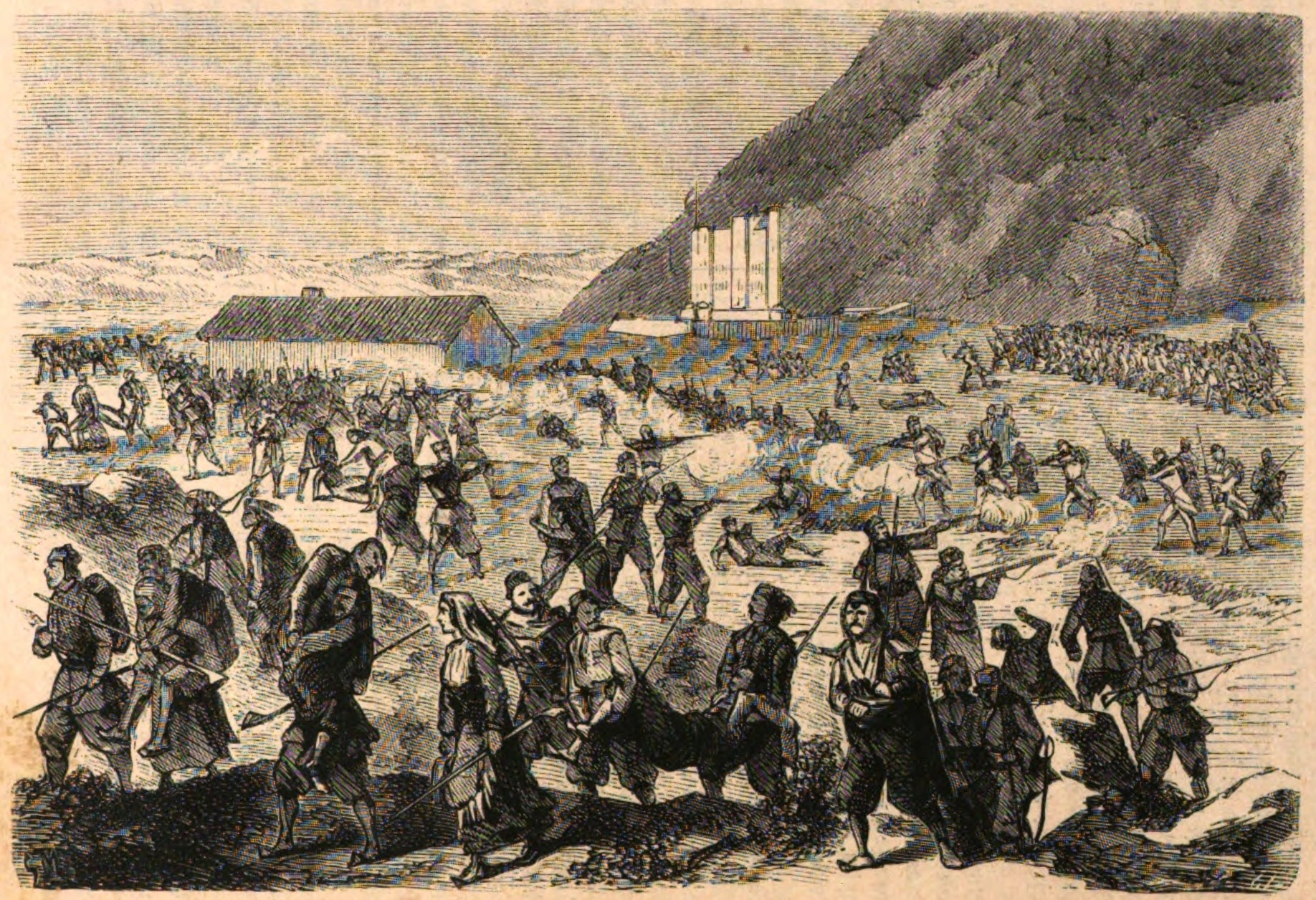
- Illustration of combat between Austro-Hungarian forces and rebels from La Ilustración Española y Americana (25 December 1869)
Date	7 October 1869 – 11 January 1870
Location	Bay of Kotor, Austro-Hungarian Empire
Result	Rebel military victory: Austria-Hungary abandons conscription and grants a general amnesty for rebels
Territorial changes	Status quo ante bellum

Belligerents
Serb rebels; Aided by: Montenegro	Austria-Hungary

Commanders and leaders
	Johann Ritter von Wagner; Gavrilo Rodić

Strength
~1,000	13,000+

The Krivošije uprising of 1869 was an internal conflict in the far south of the Austro-Hungarian Empire that broke out following the Austro-Hungarian government's decision to extend military conscription to the Serb tribe and region of Krivošije. It lasted from October 1869 until a formal peace accord was signed on 11 January 1870. The rebels managed to defeat the Austro-Hungarian army detachments sent against them and in the end the government conceded on all points of dispute.

== Background ==
In 1869 it was announced that conscription, in accordance with the Wehrgesetz (Defence Act) of 1868, would be extended to the Krivošije, a tribe and its mountainous region in the north of the Kotor district, the southernmost district of the Kingdom of Dalmatia, north of the Bay of Kotor. The region had been under Austrian rule since 1814. The local population was Serb, Orthodox and tribal. Although the men traditionally bore arms and some had volunteered in the Austrian Navy—there being a major naval base at Kotor—they had never been obligated to serve in the army.

== War ==
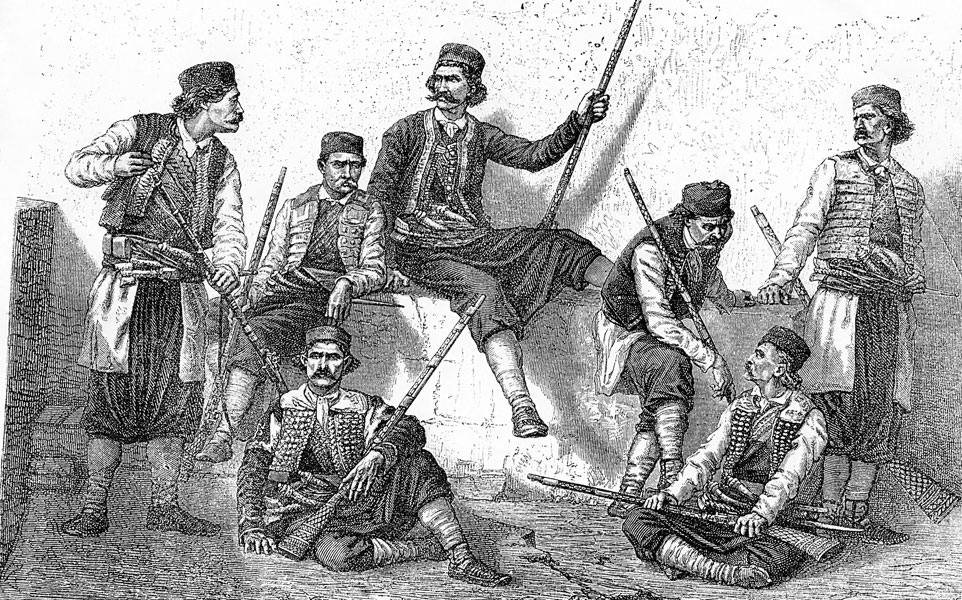
Armed Krivošije tribesmen, woodcut from Světozor magazine (5 June 1878)

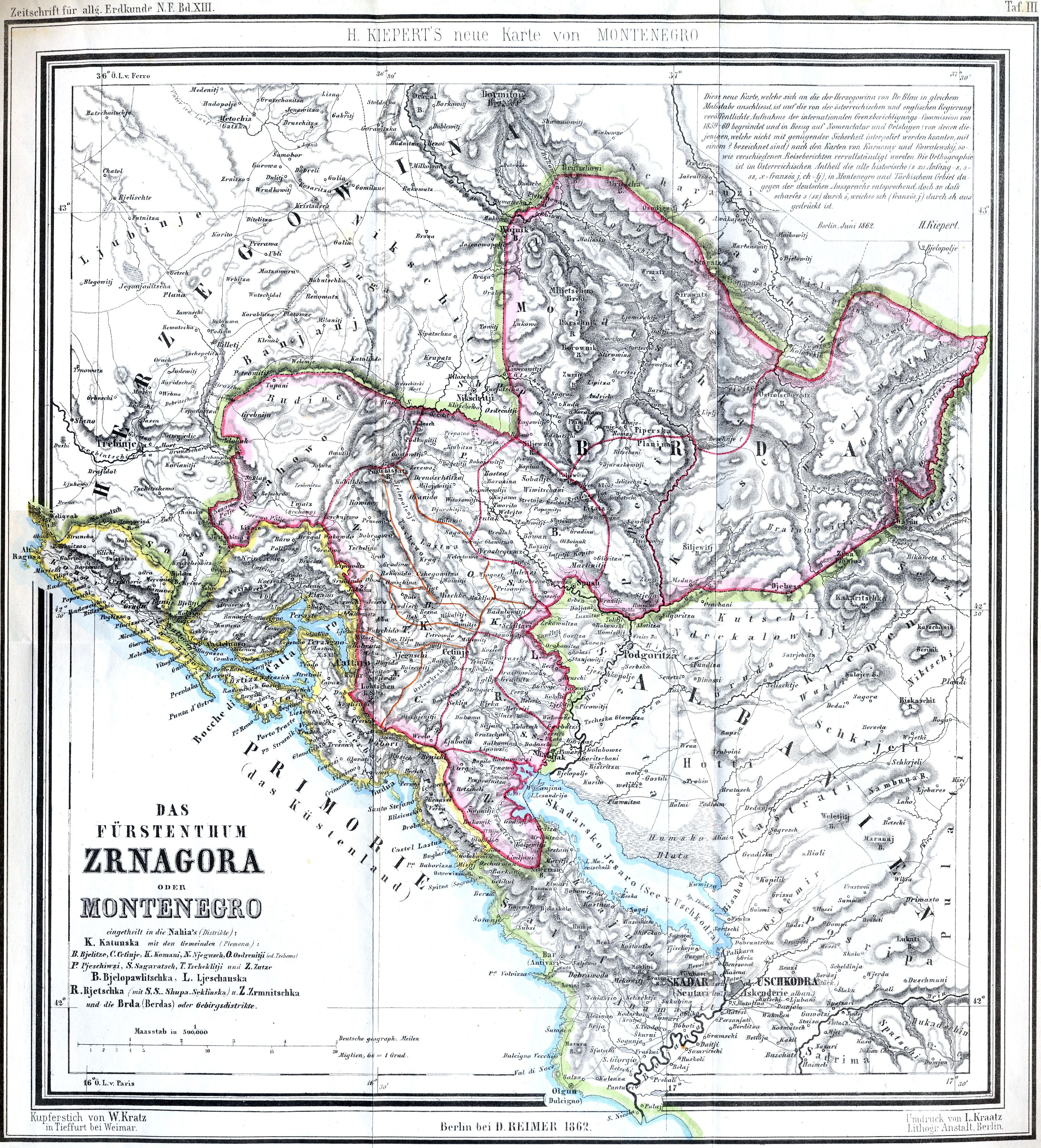
Map of Montenegro, Herzegovina and the Kotor district of Dalmatia from 1862

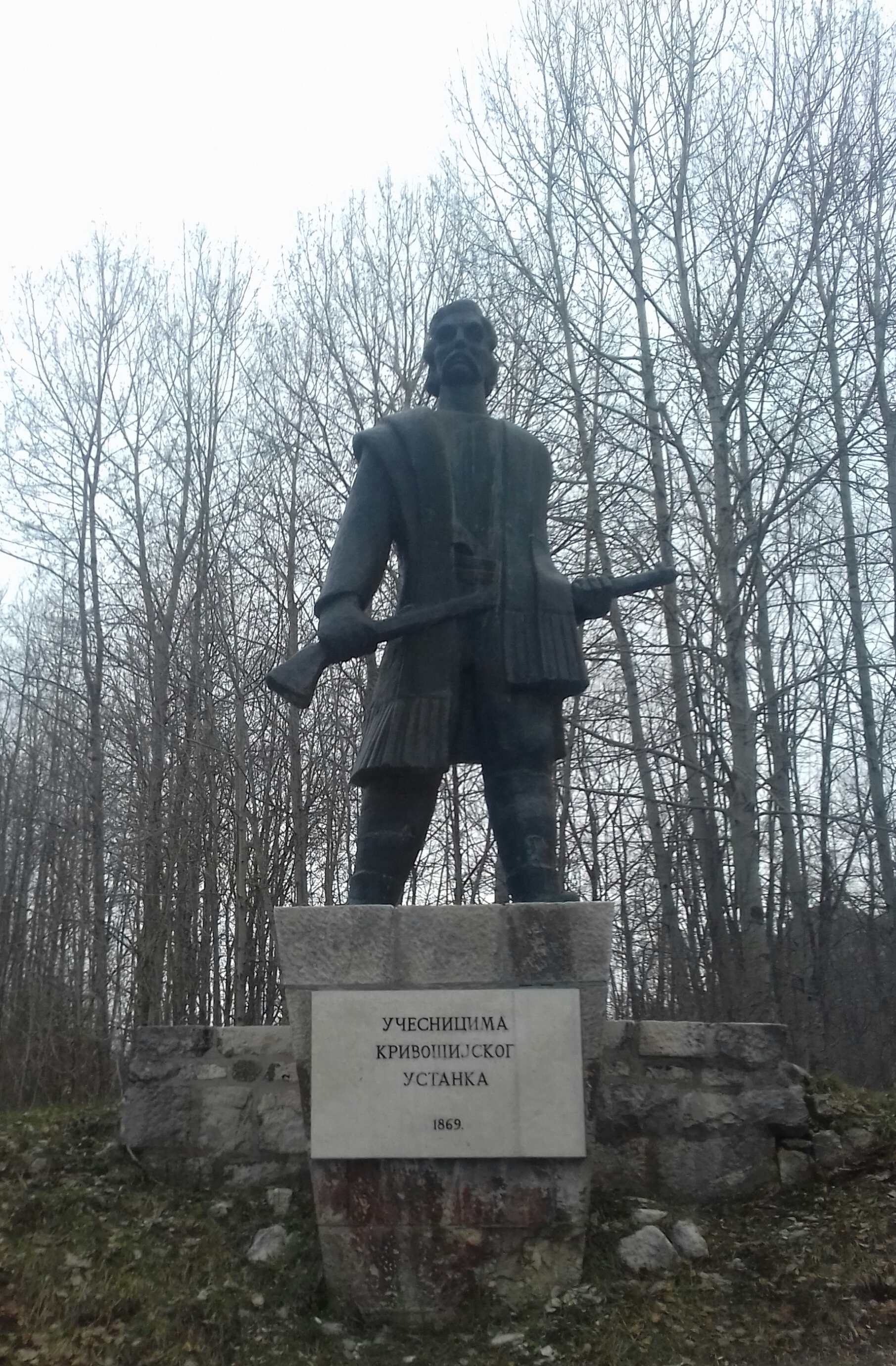
Monument in Crkvice dedicated to rebels of the Krivošije Uprising

Despite the opposition raised by the new order, in his initial reports the Dalmatian governor, Feldmarschalleutnant Johann Ritter von Wagner, insisted that the situation was under control. In September, he ordered the population disarmed and conscription enforced. Immediately fighting broke out between his troops and the tribesmen. On 7 October, so as "not [to] besmirch the honor of our arms or damage the prestige of the government", Wagner asked for reinforcements. With help from their compatriots in independent Montenegro and some bands from Ottoman Herzegovina, the Krivošije rebels defeated the first detachments sent against them. By November, the number of Austro-Hungarian battalions in the field had increased from five to eighteen. Artillery had been brought up and a naval squadron lay offshore. Because the Kotor district was cut off from the rest of the empire by Ottoman Sutorina, and because of the poor state of its roads, the Austro-Hungarian navy had the large task of ferrying all 10,000 reinforcements. The Krivošije rebels were only about 1,000 in number.

The inspector-general, Archduke Albrecht, blamed the "colossal" blunders of Wagner for the failure to subdue the insurgents. In December, a meeting of the Common Ministerial Council (the Austro-Hungarian cabinet) was held to discuss the problem. The Minister of War, Franz Kuhn von Kuhnenfeld, downplayed it, believing the troops could "deal with a few hundred bandits", while Feldzeugmeister Gavrilo Rodić and the Chef der Militärkanzlei, Friedrich von Beck-Rzikowsky, urged a compromise with the rebels, support for whom was increasing in other south Slavic areas. Rodić suggested that Wagner be dismissed and that he himself replace him with the discretionary power to grant an amnesty. This was done and, on 11 January 1870, a peace treaty was signed at Knežlaz. The rebels surrendered to General Rodić and were allowed to keep their weapons. Conscription was abandoned and a general pardon was granted to all insurgents.

The result of the uprising was an embarrassing setback for the Austro-Hungarian government. The Compromise of 1867 with the Hungarians was "widely considered as a sell-out of the South Slavs" and the Krivošije revolt engendered sympathy among the empire's Croats. Beck was convinced that the rebels were encouraged by foreign elements. Friedrich von Beust, Chairman of the Ministerial Council, blamed the Italians for smuggling arms to the rebels, although no evidence of such trans-Adriatic shipments was ever found. During the uprising, an article was published in Italy urging the annexation of Albania, which did little to allay Austria-Hungary's concerns.

In 1881, after the incorporation of Bosnia and Herzegovina into Austria-Hungary in 1878, the government introduced conscription into the new provinces and renewed its claims in Krivošije. This provoked a new uprising which quickly spilled over into the new provinces. This was perhaps the intention: to create an opportunity to remove the stain of the defeat of 1869.

== Sources ==
- Donia, Robert J. (1985). "The Habsburg Imperial Army in the Occupation of Bosnia and Hercegovina". In Béla K. Király; Gale Stokes (eds.). Insurrections, Wars, and the Eastern Crisis in the 1870s. War and Society in East Central Europe. Vol. 27. Boulder, CO: Social Science Monographs. pp. 375–91.
- Rothenberg, Gunther E. (1998) [1976]. The Army of Francis Joseph. West Lafayette, Indiana: Purdue University Press.
- Sondhaus, Lawrence (1994). The Naval Policy of Austria-Hungary, 1867–1918: Navalism, Industrial Development and the Politics of Dualism. West Lafayette, Indiana: Purdue University Press.
