= Cape Lazo =

Headland in British Columbia, Canada

Coordinates: 49°42′05″N 124°51′36″W

Cape Lazo is a headland at the tip of the Comox Peninsula on Vancouver Island, British Columbia, Canada. The community of Lazo is located near the cape.

In 1791 Narváez named the cape Punta de Lazo de la Vega. In Spanish, lazo means 'snare' and vega means 'an open plain'.
