= Crkvice, Montenegro =

Crkvice Црквице
- Village
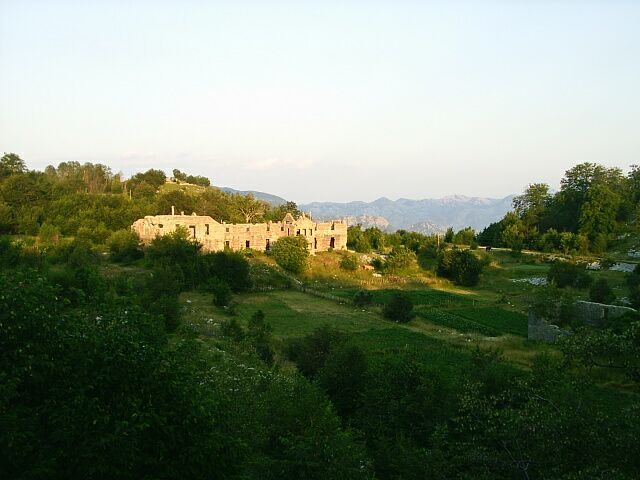
- Interactive map of Crkvice
- Location of Crkvice in Montenegro
- Coordinates: 42°34′N 18°38′E
- Country: Montenegro
- Municipality: Kotor
- Elevation: 1,092 m (3,583 ft)
- Time zone: UTC+1 (CET)
  - Summer (DST): UTC+2 (CEST)
- Area code: +382 32

Crkvice (Serbian Cyrillic: Црквице, pronounced [t͡sř̩kv̞it͡sɛ]) is a village in Krivošije, on the outskirts of Mount Orjen in Montenegro, and the wettest inhabited place in Europe. Despite the fact that it is nowadays virtually uninhabited, Crkvice was most notable the location of a large Austro-Hungarian military base which was active until the end of World War I, when Montenegro regained control of the area.

== History ==
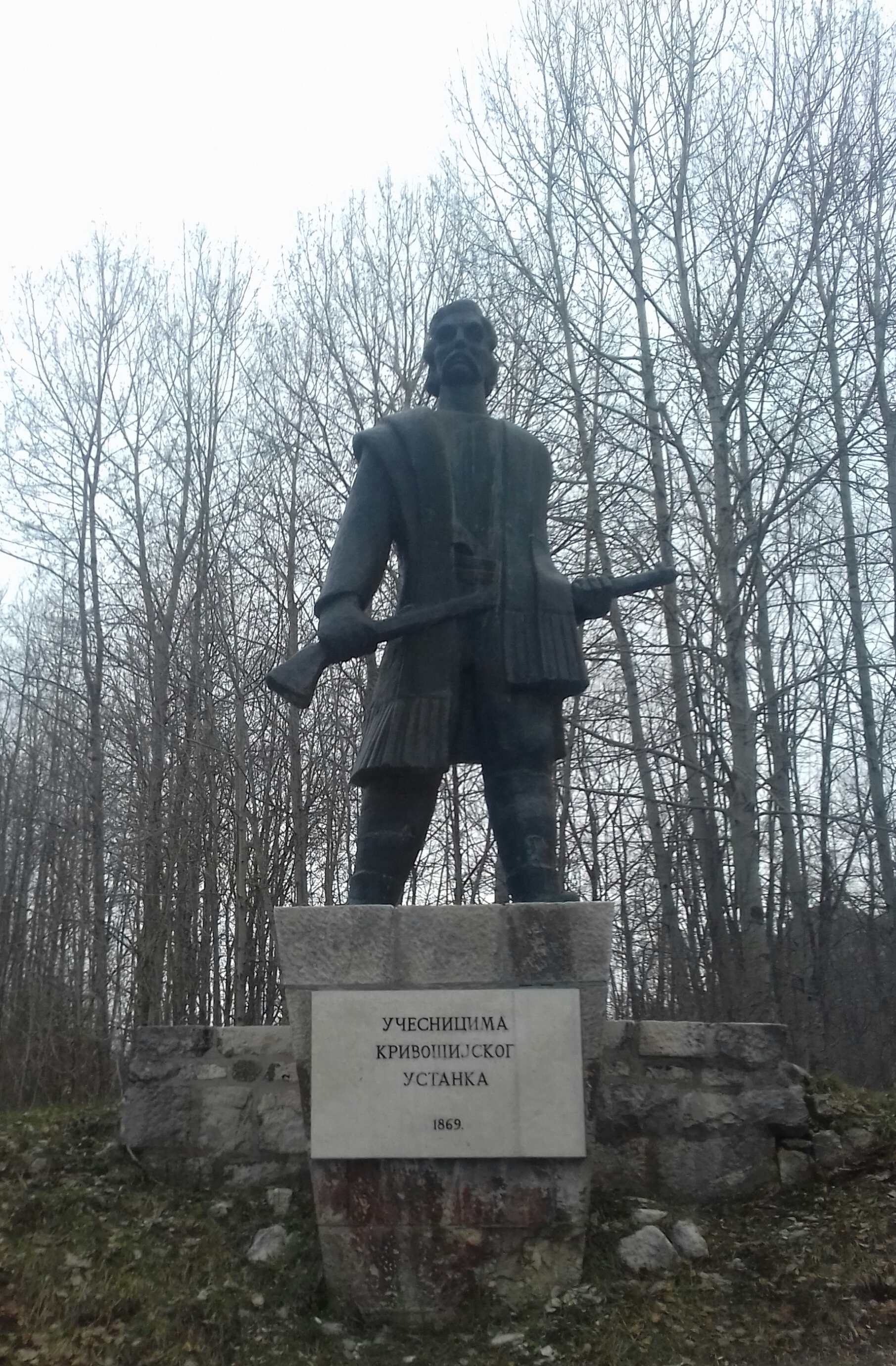
Monument in Crkvice dedicated to rebels of the Krivošije Uprising (1869)

During the rule of the Austria-Hungary over the Krivošije region, Crkvice was used up as the base military camp. The fortifications, including Fort Kom (Crkvice Ostfort) and Fort Stražnik (Crkvice Westfort), were built by the Austro-Hungarian soldiers in the first half of the 19th century, and represented the furthest fortification towards the border with Montenegro. During that period, over 150 objects were built in Crkvice, including military training grounds, hotel, tennis courts, bowling alley, football pitch with stands for 1,000 spectators, cinema, church, bakery, hospital, post office, stables, and even a funicular. During the Austro-Hungarian period, Crkvice had up to 10,000 inhabitants. Crkvice bakery was the largest in Balkans at the time, having produced 24 tons of bread per day.

The monument dedicated to the victorious rebels of the 1869 Krivošije uprising was put up in Crkvice on its centenary in 1969.

== Climate ==
Crkvice is within the Mediterranean subtropical belt. While summers are hot and sunny, autumn, winter and spring are rainy seasons. A peculiarity of the littoral Dinarids is the precipitation regime as the settlements of Orjen receive more precipitation than any others in Europe.

Annual rainfall at Crkvice is around 5,100 millimetres (200 in). Like most of the Mediterranean Sea, precipitation occurs principally during the winter, but in the higher mountains there is a secondary summer maximum. August is frequently completely dry, leading to forest fires.

With a maximum discharge of 350 m³/s water one of the biggest karst springs, the Sopot spring near Risan, is a remarkable indicator of this seasonality. Most of the time it is inactive but after heavy rain a remarkable waterfall appears 20 m above the Bay of Kotor.

Two wind systems are noteworthy for their ecological significance: bora and jugo. Strong cold downslope winds of Bura type appear in winter and are most severe in the Bay of Risan. Gusts reach 250 km/h and can lead to a significant fall of temperatures in several hours with freezing events problematic for most of the Mediterranean cultures. Jugo is a warm humid wind and is important as it brings heavy rain. It appears throughout the year but is most frequent in autumn and spring.

== See also ==
- Krivošije
- Fort Kom
- Fort Stražnik
- Malov Do
