= Live Not as You Would Like To =

1854 play by Alexander Ostrovsky

- Written by: Aleksander Ostrovsky
- Original language: Russian
- Subject: Maslenitsa
- Genre: Family drama
- Setting: 18th century Moscow

Premiere
- Date premiered: 3 December 1854
- Place premiered: Maly Theatre in Moscow

Live Not as You Would Like To (Note: Russian: Не так живи, как хочется, romanized: Ne tak zhiví, kak khóchetsya, IPA: [nʲɪ təg‿ʐɨˈvʲi kɐk ˈxotɕɪtsə]) is a play by Alexander Ostrovsky. It premiered on 3 December 1854 at the Moscow's Maly Theatre and was published for the first time in the No. 17, September 1855 issue of Moskvityanin magazine.

== Synopsis ==
Pyotr has eloped with Dasha, the daughter of an innkeeper, and moved to Moscow, where he has begun to drink heavily and neglect his work; he insults his visiting father, who leaves in anger. It turns out that Pyotr is courting another woman, pretending to be single; when Dasha tries to leave him, her father refuses to take her back, and when the other woman learns he is married she tells him to get out. In a drunken rage he goes out with a knife to kill Dasha on the frozen Moscow River, but the sound of church bells brings him to his senses and he begs everyone's forgiveness and promises to turn over a new leaf.

== History ==
Initially Ostrovsky had in mind a five-act drama, set in the 17th century, in one of the Privolzhye's cities. An old Russian proverb, God's Thing Is Strong, the Foe's One Just Sticky (Боже крепко, а враже лепко), gave the play its working title. The rough draft of it appeared in August 1854. The play's second version, a three-act drama now called Live Not As You Would Like To was set in the 18th century Moscow, in the days of the traditional Russian Maslenitsa pancake carnival.

In November 1854 the play was completed and on December 3 premiered at the Maly Theatre. It was published in September 1855 (with 600 copies of a separate book edition pressed simultaneously), proving to be Ostrovsky's final publication for Moskvityanin. This magazine's text had to undergo some changes, though. The new, edited version appeared in the 1859 Works by A.N.Ostrovsky in two volumes published by Count Grigory Kushelev-Bezborodko.

=== Productions ===
Live Not As You Would Like To premiered at the Maly Theatre on 3 December 1854, as a benefit for Kornely Poltavtsev who played Pyotr. It featured Prov Sadovsky as Agafon, Lyubov Nikulina-Kositskaya as Grusha and Sergey Vasilyev as Vasya. Its Alexandrinsky Theatre premier took place on 12 January 1885, featuring Pyotr Stepanov (Pyotr), Alexandra Chitau (Dasha), Yulia Linskaya (Afimya) and Alexander Martynov as Yeremka, among others.

The play was less successful than all of its predecessors. It ran one season (1854–55, four performances) in the Maly, then dropped from the theatre's repertoire to re-emerge in 1861. It was running in numerous provincial theatres, though, and in 1875-1917 was performed throughout Russia more than 1500 times.

=== The Power of the Fiend ===
The play included fragments of ten folk songs, best loved by the author. The one called "I Sit on a Stone, I Hold an Axe" was picked by Ostrovsky while travelling along the Volga River banks. Another Yeremka's song, "It's For Me to Help Your Grief", was once popular in the Kineshma region.

Alexander Serov thought the play's plot was an ideal material for an opera, and insisted that Ostrovsky should write a libretto, which he did while in Shchelykovo, in the summer of 1857. Serov's attempts to change the final scene (notably, to have Pyotr killing Dasha) have been heartily disapproved by Ostrovsky, for whom the idea of the hero's moral reformation was crucial. The libretto has been changed without Ostrovsky's consent, and Serov called his opera The Power of the Fiend.

== Reception ==
The first to give the play a positive review was Aleksey Nekrasov who (writing in Sovremennik's No. 2, 1856 issue) argued that "only in the first, best-known Ostrovsky play, the Family Affair, such vivid, masterfully depicted characters could be found... Each and every face here exudes the true Russian spirit." Still, the reviewer deplored what he considered the author's binding himself with the Slavophiles' ideas and advised him "not to narrow" himself "down consciously, not even to the doctrines that would look to him indisputable."

Nikolai Dobrolyubov, in his Realm of Darkness essay mostly used the play as a pretext to criticize the Slavophile critics who, as he saw it, "were attempting to present the author as a purveyor of this ugly morality which prescribes tolerance without borders and total self-denial when it comes to one's individual rights." Once Ostrovsky's friend, now a prominent Slavophile Terty Filippov in Russkaya Beseda (No.1, 1856) admitted that "the idea of this drama was of great importance and its dramatic implementation would be worthy of a critical support if only for an insightful artistic intention." Otherwise he considered it the weakest of all the Ostrovsky's plays. It was "underdeveloped characters", according to the critic, that brought about its failure.

Apollon Grigoriev, writing in Russky Mir (1860) also spotted the chasm between the "genius idea" and "poor implementation". It was Grigoriev who first proposed that Live Not as You Would Like To should be re-worked into a musical piece and suggested that Alexander Serov do that.

Leo Tolstoy enjoyed Live Not As You Would Like To, admitting that his own The Power of Darkness has been written under the influence of Ostrovsky's play.
