= The Poor Bride =

Play by Alexander Ostrovsky

- Original language: Russian
- Written by: Aleksander Ostrovsky
- Genre: Romantic comedy

Premiere
- Date: 20 August 1853
- Place: Maly Theatre in Moscow

The Poor Bride (Russian: Бедная невеста, Romanized as Bednaya nevesta) is a play by Alexander Ostrovsky, written in 1851 and first published in the No.4, 1852 issue of Moskvityanin magazine. It was his second play to be staged at the Maly Theatre, where it premiered on 20 August 1853.

== Background ==
The Poor Bride, his second large play, caused Ostrovsky much trouble. Later he wrote: "I've had an iron-like creative prowess when I was learning how to write, but still, after having worked for a year and a half on The Poor Bride (my second one) I came to detest it so much I didn't want to see it on stage. I agreed to stage it only responding to the continuous actors' requests, two years after it was finished." The plot has been changed thrice.

The target of Ostrovsky's satire was Saint Petersburg's 'romantic poseurs'. Merich (Zorich in the rough version) was "a parody on Lermontov's heroes, Grushnitsky, trying to act Pechorin," according to the scholar Vladimir Lakshin. His name came from Lermontov's Meri (with a typically Lermontov-like surname ending, like in Vulich, Zvezdich or Kazbich). In one of the play's versions Marya Andreyevna was holding Lermontov's book in hand. "The charisma of a disappointed romantic hero which became a cliché in the Russian literature of the 1840s was waiting for a literary backlash," Lakshin wrote.

Another biographer, S.V. Maksimov, insisted the play's characters were portraits of the real people who surrounded the author, rather than mere schemes. The Nezabudkins had similarities with the Korsh family (three brothers and five sisters were all known in the artistic circles), Benevolensky's prototype was professor Krylov, one of the Korsh sisters' husband and the main reason for Ostrovsky's leaving the university (who failed the latter at the exam, allegedly waiting for a bribe). The liaison between Khorkov and Marya Andreyevna served as a parallel to the unhappy relations between one of the Korsh sisters, Antonina, and Apollon Grigoryev, according to Lakshin. For V.A. Grigoriev (Apollon's grandson), though, Marya Andreyevna looked more like Zinaida Korsh whom the author himself fancied. The singer, folklorist and later senior state official Terty Filippov was a prototype for the Milashin character. "Benevolensky, Dobrotvorsky and Merich were all the real people Ostrovsky was meeting in the Korsh's house, or elsewhere. But in reality there was no such marriage as the one described in the play," V.A.Grigoryev argued.

== History ==
Ostrovsky first mentioned The Poor Bride in a letter to Mikhail Pogodin in the summer of 1850. On October 31 that year he recited fragments of it in his editor's home. In the summer of 1851 the play was finished but the author continued to make changes to the text. On November 3 he informed Pogodin: "The comedy is lagging behind a bit for I've heard Pisemsky's comedy [The Hyppochondriac] and found it necessary to embellish my own a bit so as not to blush for it."

In December the play was submitted to censors. On 19 February the permission for the magazine publication was received and the play appeared in the February issue of Moskvityanin. In 1859 The Poor Bride was re-issued as part of The Works by A.N.Ostrovsky in two volumes (published by Count Grigory Kushelev-Bezborodko), again after harsh authorial editing. This version of the text is considered to be the final one and it was in this form that the play would be reproduced in numerous collections and anthologies in the years to come.

It took half a year for censors to give the permission for the stage production. In September 1852 The Poor Bride was pronounced eligible for the Maly Theatre stage, much to the credit of censor Gederstern who interpreted it as romantic drama and ignored its social undercurrents. Two roles, those of Dunya and Pasha, though, had to be cancelled and re-appeared in the text only in October 1861. Angered by the cuts, Ostrovsky asked Verstovsky to delay the production of the Bride and wait for his next play, Stay in Your Own Sled, which he was working upon.

The Poor Bride was premièred in Maly Theater on August 20, 1853, with Agrafena Saburova as Nezabudkina, Ekaterina Vasilyeva (Marya Andreyevna), Nikolai Cherkasov (Merich), Sergey Vasilyev (Milashin), Sergey Shumsky (Dobrotvorsky), Prov Sadovsky (Benevolensky), Kornely Poltavtsev (Khorkov) and Sophia Akimova (Khorkova). On October 12, 1863, the play was performed in the Alexandrinsky Theatre, as a benefit for actress Maria Chitau (Maria Andreyevna). The permission for the play to be performed at the Russian public theatres came only on 3 May 1893, the characters of Dunya and Pasha again excised.

== Reception ==
On March 20, 1852, Aleksey Pisemsky wrote to Ostrovsky: "I've read the comedy of yours with the greatest of pleasure and found it not just equal but even superior to It's a Family Affair-We'll Settle It Ourselves. Its humour is more subtle and soulful while the characters are so vivid they even visit me in dreams."

Ivan Turgenev opined that the play failed to meet the expectations which were too high after the Family Affair, but found "its general colour very true" and "the second act beautiful from the first word to the last." In 1879, re-issuing his article, Turgenev revised his initial assessment and called the play "one of this dramatist's best". Nikolai Chernyshevsky found the play "very good" even if lacking "the sense of revelation" which had been brought by the Family Affair.

A socio-political analysis of the play was provided by Nikolai Dobrolyubov in his 1859 essay. Having described in full the difficult situation Marya Andreyevna, the "poor bride", found herself in, the critic poised the question: "What this hapless creature suffers all these insults for, what keeps her in this mire?" - and gave the answer: "It is obvious, what: she is a poor bride, she has nothing to do other than sit there waiting or go seeking for the right kind of fiancée... Modern liberals scorn this, but one would like to know - what is there left in our society to do for a young girl who fails to marry?" According to Dobrolyubov, in his play Ostrovsky gave "the direct answer" to the most important question of the day: "why in our families a woman finds herself in a slave-like situation and why does samodurstvo [petty tyranny] hits her particularly hard."
