= Feodosia Snetkova =

Russian stage actress

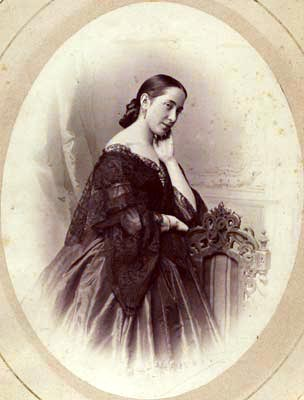
- Born: 1838; Russian Empire
- Died: February 13, 1929 (aged 90–91)
- Occupation: Actress

Feodosia Aleksandrovna Snetkova (1838 – February 13, 1929) was a Russian dramatic Actor. She performed under the pseudonyms Snetkova 3rd or Fanny Snetkova.

== Biography ==
In 1858 Snetkova graduated from the St. Petersburg Theatre School, took lessons from Vera Samoylova. Snetkova debuted as Princess Olga ("Vladimir Zarevsky" by Kondraty Efimovich) on the stage of the Alexandrinsky Theatre, where she performed from 1856 to 1863. Contemporaries called Fanny "the queen of dreams", and in her "noble and laid-back game there was not a drop of falsehood or affectation". Fanny had a sister, Maria Snetkova.

At the insistence of Alexander Ostrovsky, Snetkova played Katerina in the St. Petersburg premiere of The Storm.

On January 31, 1863, a farewell benefit performance was held by Fanny Snetkova, who decided to leave the stage. She married a retired guard lieutenant Sergei Perfiliev.

Five children were born in the family: a daughter, four sons (the memories of the youngest son Vasily have been preserved).

== Repertoire ==
Snetkova was the first performer on the St. Petersburg stage of the role of Katerina in The Storm by A. Ostrovsky (1859), before that the premiere of the play took place at the Maly Theater in Moscow. She played in plays by Pyotr Boborykin, Alexei Potekhin, Kondraty Efimovich, in translated melodramas. Her other roles include:

- Sofya – Woe from Wit by A. Griboyedov
- Krasnova – Sin and Sorrow Are Common to All by A. Ostrovsky
- Belova – The Bachelor by I. Turgenev
- Desdemona – Othello by W. Shakespeare
- Cordelia – King Lear
- Ophelia – Hamlet
- Kurchayeva – Spoiled Life by I. Chernyshev

== Literature ==
- T. Zolotnitskaya. "Fanny Snetkova – the Queen of Dreams of theatrical Petersburg" – L .: Art, 1973.
