= Ivan Gorbunov =

Russian writer and stage actor

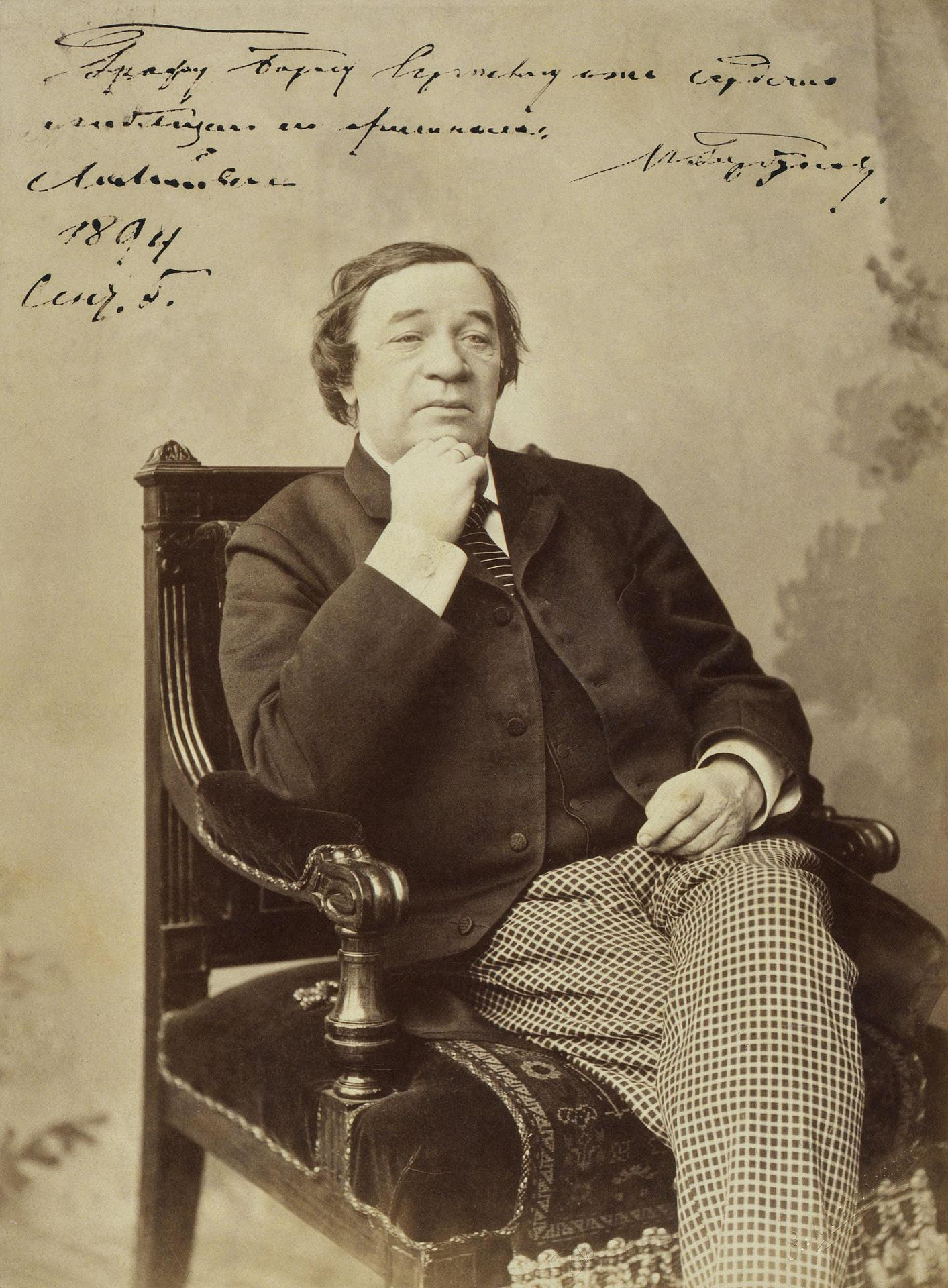
- The photograph by Elena Mrozovskaya, c.1894
- Born: 22 September 1831; Moscow Governorate, Russian Empire
- Died: 5 January 1896 (aged 64); Saint Petersburg, Russian Empire
- Occupations: actor, writer

Ivan Fyodorovich Gorbunov (Russian: Ива́н Фёдорович Горбуно́в, 22 September 1831 — 5 January 1896) was a Russian writer and stage actor, considered to be a forefather for the "literary theatre" subgenre in his county.

== Career ==
Born in Ivanteyevka in the Moscow Governorate of the Russian Empire, as a writer, Gorbunov started out in 1853, as a contributor of stories and sketches to Moskvityanin, and later Otechestvennye Zapiski. In 1854 he debuted on stage the Moscow Maly Theatre in Moscow. Two years later he moved north to the Alexandrinka with which he stayed till the end of his life. In the course of forty years he played 54 parts, most of them in plays by Alexander Ostrovsky (most memorably, Kudryash in The Storm, Pyotr in The Forest and Afonya in Sin and Sorrow Are Common to All), his friend for whom he occasionally worked as a secretary.

In the 1850s Gorbunov started to introduce the audiences to his own original repertoire of dramatized short stories under the heading of Scenes from the People's Life (Сцены из народного быта), satirizing all strata of the Russian society, particularly petty state officials. They earned him praise from Dostoyevsky, who found there "...a lot of astute observations and the deep understanding of the nature of Russian people."

Famous across Russia, Gorbunov was equally loved by peasants and the last of the three Russian Tsars. The humour of his stories "spread all through the country in the form of proverbs, and folk jokes," according to Alexey Pleshcheyev. Later in his life Gorbunov acquired the reputation of a credible Russian theatre historian. He was the founder of the first ever museum of theatre in his country.

Gorbunov, who attended art college and Moscow University (which he never graduated) and had the profound knowledge of Russian history, culture and folklore, was a self-taught folklore scholar. It was him who introduced Modest Musorgsky to the folk song "Iskhodila mladyuoshenka" (Исходила младёшенька) which the latter used in his Khovanshchina opera, as "Marfa's Song".

Gorbunov died in Saint Petersburg on 5 January 1896.

The Collected Works by I.F. Gorbunov in three volumes came out in 1902–1907.
