= Sergey Shumsky =

Russian stage actor

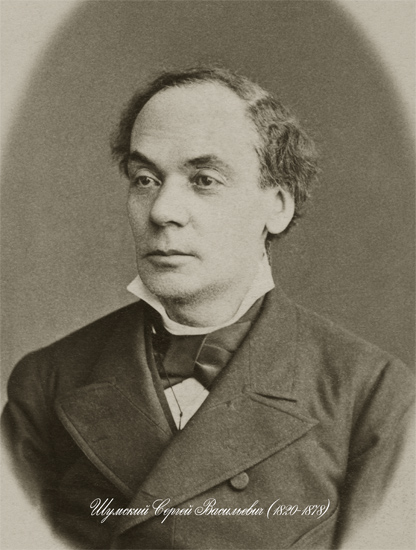
- Born: Sergey Vasilyevich Chesnokov; Сергей Васильевич Чесноков; October 19, 1820; Moscow, Russian Empire
- Died: February 18, 1878 (aged 57); Moscow, Imperial Russia
- Occupations: actor, theatre director

Sergey Vasilyevich Chesnokov (Russian: Сергей Васильевич Чесноков; 19 October 1820, in Moscow, Imperial Russia – 18 February 1878, in Moscow, Imperial Russia) was a Russian stage actor better known under his stage name, Sergey Shumsky.

== Career ==
A Shchepkin School graduate, Sergey Chesnokov made his stage debut as early as 1830, in the Nikolai Khmelnitsky's vaudeville Actors Among Themselves, playing a character called Shumsky. The dramatist Fyodor Kokoshkin, who was the Imperial Theatres's Moscow department director at the time, praised the boy's performance and suggested that he should keep this surname to himself, as a stage name.

While still a student, Shumsky started to perform at the Maly Theatre where his appearance as Dobchinsky in Gogol's Revizor was noticed and lauded by Vissarion Belinsky, who wrote: "Shumsky, as Dobchinsky is brilliant... This air of good-natured provincial idiocy which he is apparently so good at assuming, cannot be praised enough."

In 1841, after the graduation, Shumsky was invited to the Maly Theatre where for the next six years he played more than sixty parts, notably in plays by Dmitry Lensky, Nikolai Gogol and Alexander Griboyedov. After a three-year stint at the Odessa Theatre he returned to the Maly to stay there for the rest of his life. During his forty years career as a stage actor Shumsky was engaged in more than 500 parts, some of them in Alexander Ostrovsky's plays, including Vikhorev (Stay in Your Own Sled, 1853), Zhadov (A Profitable Position, 1863); Obroshenov (Jokers, 1864); Krutitsky (Enough Stupidity in Every Wise Man, 1868), Dobrotvorsky (The Poor Bride, 1853), Schastlivtsev (The Forest, 1871), Margaritov (The Belated Love, 1873), Groznov (Truth Is Good, But Happiness' Better, 1876).

In the late 1860s Sumsky retired to start teaching drama at the Moscow Conservatory where in 1869 he produced the opera A Life for the Tsar, by Mikhail Glinka.
