= Stay in Your Own Sled =

- Written by: Aleksander Ostrovsky
- Original language: Russian
- Genre: Comedy

Premiere
- Date premiered: 14 January 1853
- Place premiered: Maly Theatre in Moscow

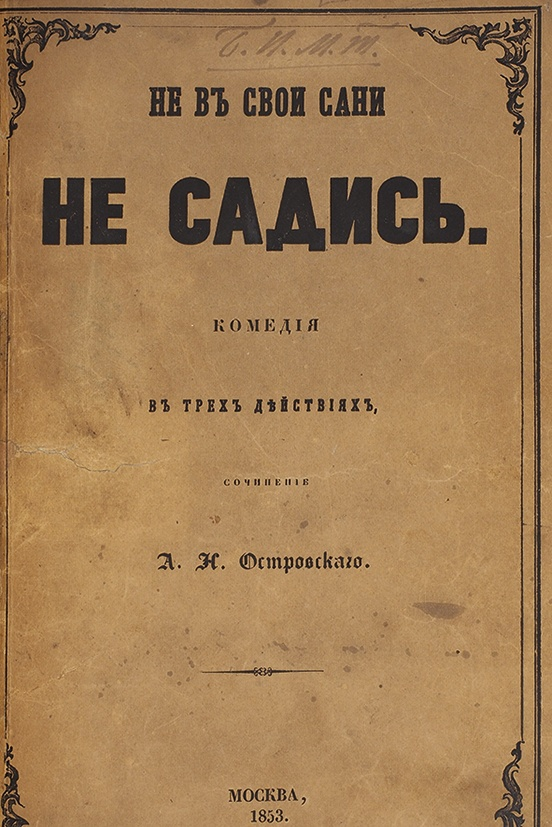

Stay in Your Own Sled (Russian: Не в свои сани не садись, an idiom meaning "Don't bite off more than you can chew,") is a play by Alexander Ostrovsky, written in 1852 and first published in the No.5 (March, book 1), 1853 issue of Moskvityanin. It was the first of his plays to be given a theatrical production, as Russian government censorship had previously confined his plays to print or readings in private houses. The play premiered in the Maly Theatre on January 14, 1853.

== History ==
By 1852, all of Ostrovsky's work, including any translation, had been banned from being produced on stage. Years later he wrote: "The author, especially the one who is just starting, who's got one or two plays banned without an explanation, becomes a slave to his own fear… Once he comes across a long idea, he tends to shorten it; once he creates a strong character, he weakens it, once he hits upon a fiery, powerful phrase, he dulls it for in all of this he now starts to see the possible reasons for future prohibitions." His new play was the result of such a compromise: it was a melodrama, less daring than the Family Affair and not as ambitious as The Poor Bride, with many sharp edges dulled. The main character, Rusakov, was the portrayal of a real person, merchant Kosheverov, actor Prov Sadovsky's relative who delighted Ostrovsky with his openness and easy ways with money.

The play, originally called One's Got to Guess When Good Thing's Good (Ot dobra dobra ne ishchut), has been in the works all through 1852. On October 6 that year Mikhail Pogodin mentioned in his diary that he'd heard the play as read by its author. On November 19 Ostrovsky informed Pogodin that the text had been sent to the censors.

Ostrovsky staged the play for the first time himself in the house of his friend Nikolai Panov (the one who first started to collect Ostrovsky's manuscripts, the work which later Nikolai Shapovalo took upon himself). Podkhalyuzin was played by the author himself and, reportedly, with this performance he made even Prov Sadovsky laugh. Another amateur performance of such kind has been staged in Pavlovsky Posad, at the factory owned by Prince Yakov Gruzinsky, a man whose son, actor Ivan Nikulin, was a husband of actress Lyubov Nikulina-Kositskaya.

Pogodin assisted with the promotion by approaching his old acquaintance Stepan Gedeonov (who later succeeded his father as the Director of the Imperial Theatres). Once the censorial permission has been received, in January 1853 Verstovsky assigned it to Lyubov Kositskaya's benefice. The latter had an influential detractor in Countess Rostopchina who hated Kositskaya's simple ways and described her as "the turnip-like creature, with a head looking like an ill-formed water-melon, or cabbage... And what a vile, sloven diction!" All of this, though, as biographer Lakshin noted, was part of the reason why the actress was so admired by the theatre-going Moscovites.

=== Productions ===
The play was premiered at the Moscow's Maly Theatre on January 14, 1853 and had great success, praised even by Ostrovsky's detractors like Vasily Botkin. The second and the third performances were even better, with both Kositskaya and Sadovsky (as Rusakov) excelling. This, according to Lakshin, was the birth of what later would be termed as "the Ostrovsky's theater," the "true union of the drama and the artists." Later that season the play has been shown 12 times in the Bolshoy Theatre, which marked Ostrovsky's debut there.

In the early February 1853 Ostrovsky went to Saint Petersburg for the first time. There he was received by the director of the Imperial Theatres Alexander Gedeonov and became friends with actor Fyodor Burdin who helped with getting the permission for another of Ostrovsky's plays, The Young Man's Morning to be produced in the capital; it was premiered on February 12, 1853 in the Circus Theatre. On February 19 Stay in Your Own Sled premiered in Alexandrinsky Theatre. Again it was a success although the actors' work was less inspired and more formulaic than that of their Moscow colleagues. Ostrovsky had to leave the capital before the play's premiere after having received the news of his father's dying. One of the shows in Alexandrinka was attended by Tsar Nikolai I himself who appeared to be greatly impressed, having construed the play's message to be that "children should follow their parents' advice, otherwise, everything gets ruined." Addressing Gedeonov and his own entourage, he pronounced: "There's been not many plays which would have given me such pleasure," and added in French: "Се n'est pas une pièce, c'est une leçon." Next evening he brought his whole family to the theatre.

In March 1853 the play was published in the March (No.5) issue of Moskvityanin and later that year came out as a separate edition. Several years later Nikolai Dobrolyubov wrote in "The Realm of Darkness" essay: "The main idea of the play is that samodurstvo [petty domestic tyranny], no matter how meek or even tender forms it might take, still greatly damages the person subjected to it, leading to the loss of the latter's individuality. Such de-individualisation destroys both the consciousness and the reason, so that the subject of samodurstvo might unwillingly commit any kind of crime, and thus perish simply due to the lack of reason and character."
