= It's Not All Shrovetide for the Cat =

Play by Alexander Ostrovsky

- Written by: Aleksander Ostrovsky
- Original language: Russian
- Genre: Comedy

Premiere
- Date premiered: 7 October 1871
- Place premiered: Maly Theatre in Moscow

It's Not All Shrovetide for the Cat (Russian: Не всё коту масленица, romanized: Ne Vsyo Kotu Maslenitsa) is a play by Alexander Ostrovsky written in 1871 and first published in the No. 9, September 1871 issue of Otechestvennye Zapiski. It was premiered on October 7, 1871, in Moscow's Maly Theatre.

== History ==
According to Ostrovsky's notes, the play was conceived on 8 March 1871, started on 10 March and finished on 9 April of that year. "This is more an etude than a proper play, got nothing visually effective in it and written for pundits. It centers around the Moscovites' way of life, and merchants' language is being reproduced here with perfect accuracy," Ostrovsky explained in a letter to his friend, actor Fyodor Burdin on April 17.

On 21 August 1871 the Theatre and Literary Committee declared the comedy eligible for the Imperial Theatres repertoires. On December 10 it was approved by censors. The play premiered on 7 October 1871 at Maly Theatre in Moscow as a benefit for the actor Dmitry Zhivokini. On 13 January 1872, it was performed for the first time in Saint Petersburg's Alexandrinsky Theatre.

According to Ostrovsky's biographer Vladimir Lakshin, "with It's Not All Shrovetide for the Cat Ostrovsky provided a late epitaph for the samodur [domestic tyrant] type and said a farewell to it to the wholehearted laughter of the audience... 'Help!' Akhov was yelling, lost in twilight of his own thirty-roomed house once belonged to a Prince, and that was a cry for his lost power over people who were now just refusing to be afraid of him."

The play, warmly received in Moscow, flopped in Saint Petersburg due to faulty Alexandrinka production. "What does the Saint Petersburg theatre do to me? Whichever play they stage, it goes to the dogs," Ostrovsky complained. In late January 1872 Tsar Alexander II visited the theatre, was unimpressed and told so Stepan Gedeonov, the Director of the Russian Imperial Theatres. The latter suggested that "the author's idea had been apparently to show what a difference the Tsar-approved reforms were making for the people." "The monarch looked like he was pleased by such an explanation," Fyodor Burdin, a witness to the scene, remembered.
