= Alexander Ostrovsky =

Russian playwright (1823–1886)

- Александр Островский
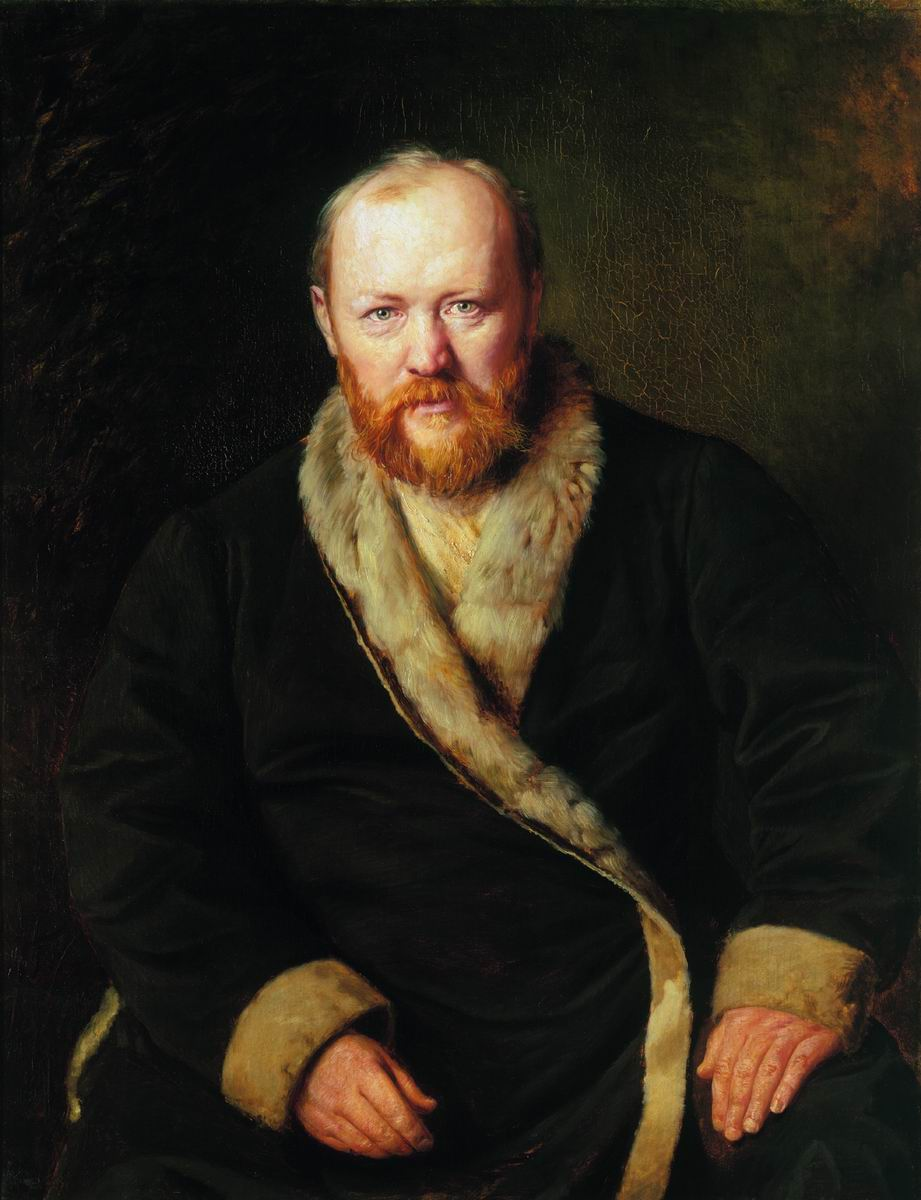
- Portrait by Vasily Perov, 1871
- Born: 12 April [O.S. 31 March] 1823; Moscow, Russian Empire
- Died: 14 June [O.S. 2 June] 1886 (aged 63); Shchelykovo, Kostroma Governorate, Russian Empire
- Occupations: Playwright; translator
- Writing career
- Period: 19th century
- Genres: Comedy; tragedy
- Notable works: Enough Stupidity in Every Wise Man; The Thunderstorm

Alexander Nikolayevich Ostrovsky (Russian: Александр Николаевич Островский; 12 April [O.S. 31 March] 1823 – 14 June [O.S. 2 June] 1886) was a Russian playwright, generally considered the greatest representative of the Russian realistic period. The author of 47 original plays, Ostrovsky "almost single-handedly created a Russian national repertoire." His dramas are among the most widely read and frequently performed stage pieces in Russia.

== Biography ==
=== Early years ===
Alexander Nikolayevich Ostrovsky was born on 12 April 1823, in the Zamoskvorechye region of Moscow, to Nikolai Fyodorovich Ostrovsky, a lawyer who had received a seminary education. Nikolai's ancestors came from the village Ostrov in the Nerekhta region of the Kostroma Governorate (north-east of Moscow), hence their surname. Later Nikolai Ostrovsky became a high-ranking state official and as such in 1839 received a title of nobility with corresponding privileges. His first wife (Alexander's mother), Lyubov Ivanovna Savvina, came from a clergyman's family. For some time the family lived in a rented flat in the Zamoskvorechye. Then Nikolai Fyodorovich bought a plot of land in Monetchiki and built a house on it. In the early 1826 the family moved there.

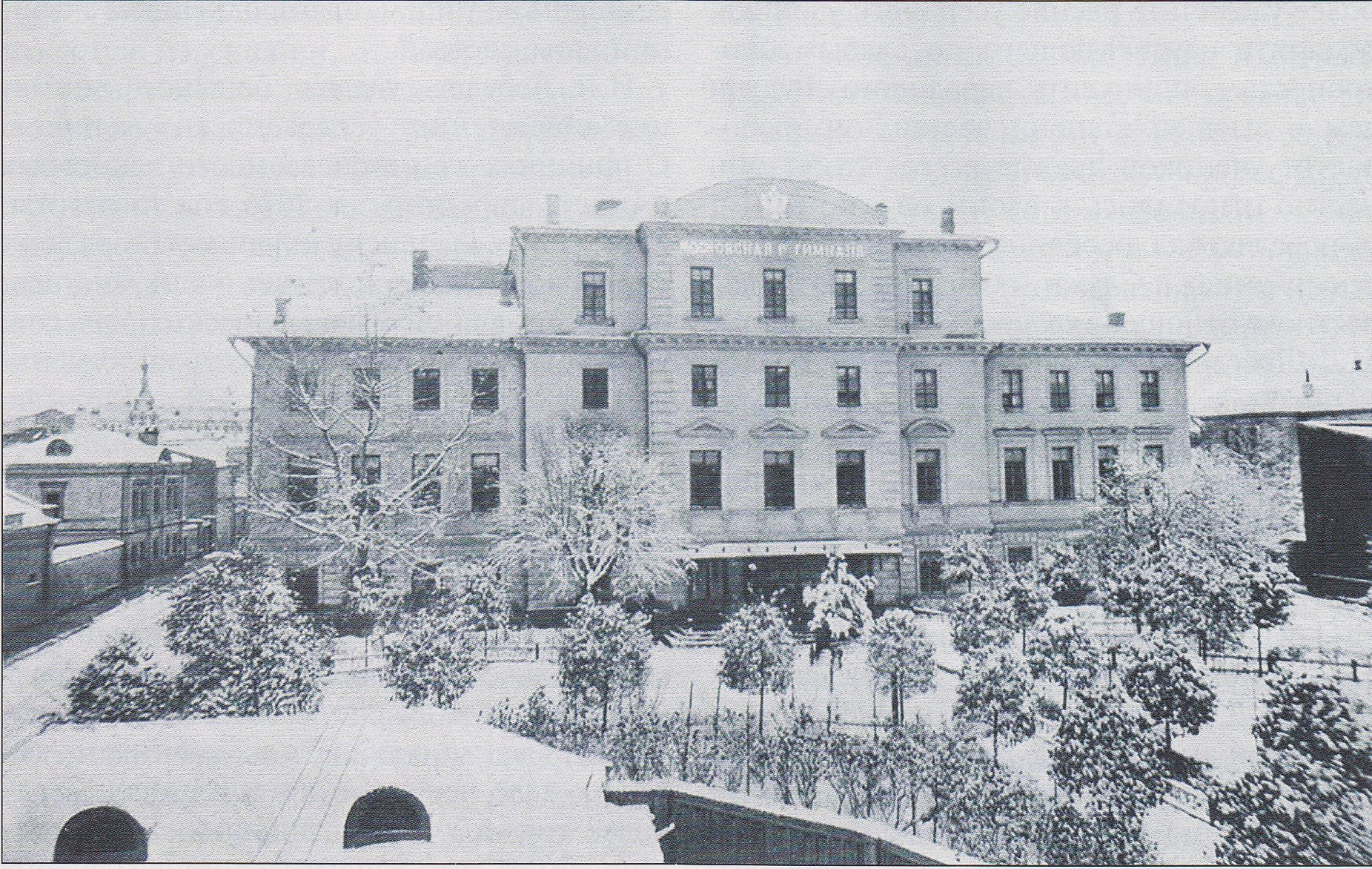
Moscow's First Gymnasium, where Ostrovsky studied

Alexander had three siblings, sister Natalya, and brothers Mikhail and Sergey. The former was his major companion in their childhood years, and from her and her girl-friends the boy learned such unmanly things as sewing and knitting. Nanny Avdotya Kutuzova played an important role in his upbringing too. Ostrovsky insisted that the fairy-tales she told him inspired one of his most popular plays, The Snow Maiden.

In 1831 Ostrovsky's mother died. In 1834 Nikolay Fyodorovich sold the Monetchiki house and bought two new ones, on Zhitnaya street. Two years later he married Baroness Emilia Andreyevna von Tessin, a noblewoman of Russian and Swedish descent. (Note: Emilia von Tessin's grand-grandfather Karl Gustaf Tessin (1695–1770, a Swedish politician, diplomat and head of the King's Chancellery) became best known for his book Letters to Prince Albert. His son, accused of links with freemasons escaped to Russia and settled in Moscow. In the early-19th century on the Yauza bank there appeared the Tessin Lan which is still there.) She rearranged the patriarchal ways of the Zamoskvorechye house, making it look more like a European mansion, and made sure that her stepchildren would receive high-quality education. Emilia Andreyevna had four children of her own, one of whom, Pyotr Ostrovsky, later became Alexander's good friend. She knew several European languages, played the piano and taught Alexander to read music.

In 1840 Ostrovsky graduated from the First Moscow Gymnasium and enrolled at Moscow University to study law. His tutors there included such prominent scholars of the time as professors Pyotr Redkin, Timofey Granovsky and Mikhail Pogodin. Soon the family moved into the house on the Yauza River owned by Ivan Tessin, Alexander's step-mother's brother. At this time Ostrovsky started to write poetry, sketches and occasionally plays (none of the latter have survived), and by the end of his second year he had become a theatre enthusiast, spending many an evening at the Moscow Petrovsky Theatre. In May 1843 Ostrovsky failed the Roman Law exams and left the university to join the Moscow Court of Consciousness as a clerk. In 1845 his father had him transferred to the Moscow Commercial Court, which specialised mostly in cases related to bribery and corruption. "If not for such an unpleasant occasion there wouldn't have been such a play as A Profitable Position," Ostrovsky noted later. In 1851 Ostrovsky made a decision to devote himself entirely to literature and theatre.

=== Literary career ===
In the mid-1840s Ostrovsky wrote numerous sketches and scenes inspired by the activities of the Zamoskvorechye merchant community and made a draft for the play called The Bankrupt. An extract from this comedy ("Scenes from the comedy The Bankrupt") was published in the No.7, 1847, issue of Moskovsky Gorodskoi Listok (Russian: Московский городской листок, lit. 'Moscow City Paper') (Note: It was through Listok, the first Russian private newspaper, started in January 1847 by professor Vladimir Drashusov, that Ostrovsky met Alexander Hertzen for the first time.) as a collaboration with actor and a minor dramatist Dmitry Gorev who had co-written one scene of it. Also in Listok appeared (as unsigned) "Pictures of Moscow Life" and "The Picture of a Family Happiness", two sets of scenes which were later published in Sovremennik (No. 4, 1856) under the title The Family Picture (Семейная картина). Ostrovsky regarded it as his first original work and the starting point of his literary career.

On 14 February 1847 Ostrovsky made his public debut in the house of the university professor and literary critic Stepan Shevyryov, with the readings from "The Pictures". The audience, which included Aleksey Khomyakov and several members of the Listok staff, responded positively: both Shevyryov and Khomyakov speaking of the emergence of a new major talent in Russian literature. On 27 August 1851, The Picture of Family Happiness (which reportedly the approval of (among others) Nikolai Gogol) was banned from being produced by Imperial Theatres. "Judging by these scenes what the Moscow merchants only do is cheat customers and drink while their wives are cheating on them", censor M. Gedeonov wrote.

In December 1849 The Bankrupt was finished. Ostrovsky's first audience was his university friend Alexey Pisemsky, who greeted it rapturously. The actor Prov Sadovsky, who described the comedy as a 'revelation', started to recite fragments of it, notably in the Countess Rostopchina's salon, frequented by the young authors like Boris Almazov, Nikolai Berg, Lev Mei and Yevgeny Edelson, Ostrovsky's friends from his university years. All of them soon accepted Mikhail Pogodin's invitation and joined Moskvityanin to form there the so-called "youth faction". Apollon Grigoriev, the informal leader of the team, started to actively promote Ostrovsky as a driving force of what he saw as the "new, authentic Russian literature".

The so-called "Ostrovsky circle" united many of his non-literary friends too, among them actor Prov Sadovsky, musician and folklorist Terty Filippov, merchant Ivan Shanin, shoe-maker Sergey Volkov, teacher Dyakov and Ioasaf Zheleznov, a Cossack from the Urals, all attracted by the idea of Russian national revival (narodnost). It was then that Ostrovsky, initially a Westernizer, started to drift towards the Slavophiles. In the Rostopchina Salon he first met the young Ivan Turgenev and the veteran Russian mason Yury Bartenev. By this time Ostrovsky was living with Agafya Ivanova, his civil wife, whom he first met and became close to in the late 1840s.

==== 1850–1853 ====
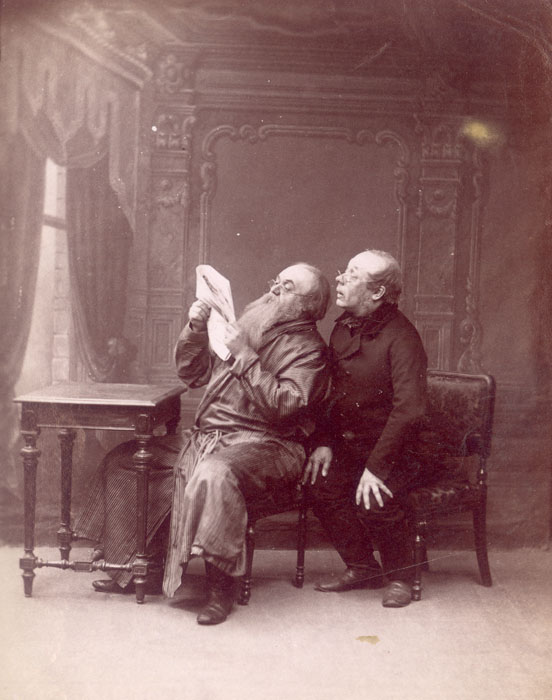
Konstantin Rybakov (as Bolshov) and Vladimir Maksheyev (as Rispolozhensky) in Ostrovsky's Family Affair. Maly Theatre, 1892

Finally approved by censors, The Bankrupt appeared in the March issue of Moskvityanin under the new title It's a Family Affair-We'll Settle It Ourselves (Свои люди – сочтёмся!). The play, portraying the rude, ignorant and smug merchants of Moscow, made Ostrovsky instantly famous in the city. It was promptly banned from being produced by Imperial Theatres (the ban would be lifted in ten years) and even prompted Russian secret police to put the author under close surveillance. Ostrovsky tried his hand as a Shakespeare translator, but his 1852 version of The Taming of the Shrew (Russian: Укрощение злой жены, lit. 'The Taming of an Evil Wife') was banned as well: the censor Nordstrom found more than one hundred "rude" words and phrases in it and declared the translation "true to the spirit of the original, quite indecent and totally unacceptable for the Russian theatre". Ostrovsky found solace in work for Moskvityanin and made a debut there as a critic, providing a positive review of The Muff by Aleksey Pisemsky.

Ostrovsky's second play was the one-act piece The Young Man's Morning (Утро молодого человека, 1850), partly based upon his early play The Legal Case (Исковое прошение; another act of the latter would later be developed into The Picture of Family Happiness). The follow-up, a psychological piece in the style of Alfred de Musset called The Surprise Case (Неожиданный случай, 1850), appeared in the Kometa almanac. Mikhail Pogodin was unimpressed and Sovremennik's Ivan Panaev responded with a caustic review, parodying what he saw as its characters' vapid, insubstantial dialogues. Ostrovsky's second full-length play, The Poor Bride (Бедная невеста), appeared in the No.4, 1852 issue of Moskvityanin. Censors gave their permission only after six months, but mangled the text in such a way that Ostrovsky lost all interest and asked the Maly inspector Alexey Verstovsky to forget about it and wait for the publication of the next play which he'd been working on already.

The melodramatic Stay in Your Own Sled (Не в свои сани не садись, 1852), less daring than Family Affair and not as ambitious as The Poor Bride, was published in Moskvityanin and became the first Ostrovsky's play to make it on to the Maly Theatre stage. It premiered in January 1853, enjoyed great success, and was received rapturously even by Ostrovsky's detractors like Vasily Botkin. With Lyubov Nikulina-Kositskaya in the leading role, the play, according to Lakshin, marked the birth of what would later be known as the "Ostrovsky Theatre, the true union of the drama and the actors." During its first season the play ran for twelve performances in the Maly, and as many times in the Bolshoy Theatre.

In the early February 1853 Ostrovsky went to Saint Petersburg for the first time where he was warmly received by Alexander Gedeonov, the director of the Imperial Theatres. On 12 February 1853, The Young Man's Morning was premiered at the Saint Petersburg Circus Theatre and on 19 February Stay in Your Own Sled was for the first time staged by Alexandrinsky Theatre. Tsar Nicholas I came to see the performance and left much impressed, mostly by its 'edifying' finale. He figured out the play's idea as being that "children should follow their parents' advice, otherwise, everything goes wrong" and, turning to Gedeonov and his own entourage, pronounced: "There haven't been many plays that gave me this much pleasure," adding in French: "Се n'est pas une piece, c'est une lecon" (This is not a play, but a lesson). Next day the Tsar brought his family to the theatre. Ostrovsky, though, had to leave the capital before the play's premiere upon receiving the news of his father's serious illness. By the time he arrived home, Nikolai Fyodorovich has been dead.

In August 1863 The Poor Bride was successfully performed at the Maly with Ekaterina Vasilyeva starring as Mariya Andreyevna. The same month Ostrovsky started to work on his next play Poverty is No Vice (Бедность не порок) and finished it in just two months to be produced by Maly Theatre as a benefit for Prov Sadovsky who played 'virtuous drunkard' Lyubim Tortsov. Poverty is No Vice, reproducing the atmosphere of the old Russian folk carnival, svyatki, lacked the Bankrupt's social awareness, but highlighted the conflict between the Slavophiles and Westernizers, the latter satirized by the author. It became popular in Moscow and prompted Apollon Grigoriev rapturous review called "Step Aside, There Goes Lyubim Tortsov." In Saint Petersburg, though, it was criticized by Krayevsky Otechestvennye zapiski (which referred to Lyubim as 'drunken lout') and by the anonymous Sovremennik reviewer who happened to be the young Nikolay Chernyshevsky.

Ostrovsky's rise to fame in both major cities was quick, but a serious opposition has already formed, notably among the Moscow actors, including Mikhail Shchepkin, Dmitry Lensky, Sergey Shumsky and Ivan Samarin. Another influential detractor was the poet Nikolay Sherbina. "What kind of characters, what sort of language!.. Only in kabaks and indecent houses do people speak and act this way. Some would argue that such things do happen in real life. But we see all kind of things around us, not all of them can be put to stage. This is theatre, after all, not some market-place show or a backyard where one is free to spill garbage out," Lensky complained in a letter to a friend. Nevertheless, Maly became the second home to Ostrovsky and he was now spending there more and more of his time, often staying for the night.

==== 1854–1856 ====
By 1854 Russia has been deeply involved in the Crimean War. Sickened by the wave of what he felt to be the government-induced 'trumpet patriotism,' Ostrovsky became reclusive and developed the urge to explore his own 'national roots'. "The cult of simplicity has now become his mania," biographer Lakshin wrote. He shifted still closer to the Slavophile doctrine with his next play, Don't Live as You Like (Не живи, как хочется, 1854), portraying the Maslenitsa pagan folk carnival, as celebrated in the 18th century Moscow. The response to the play that premiered in the Maly on 3 December 1854, with Kornely Poltavtsev as Pyotr, was lukewarm. Some saw it as not daring enough, others as too outspoken. "I was expecting the new Ostrovsky play to stir up the public in a big way but it succeeded in stirring only the negativism among critics who, unfortunately, this time proved right. It is sad to see such a talented man as Ostrovsky being so self-indulgent, spreading filth around. Once soap has become his worst enemy one can never approach him with advice, for any criticism he sees as a swipe at his 'simplicity' thing. The worst thing that can happen to an author is when he finds himself among those who regard him as demi-god," the writer Sofia Engelgardt wrote to Alexander Druzhinin. Leo Tolstoy was among those few who liked it. The play ran for just four performances in Moscow and three times in Saint Petersburg's Alexandrinka, before being dropping from both theatres' repertoires.

Meanwhile, Ostrovsky's quest for 'simplicity' appeared to be contagious. "[The Russian] authors took their cues from the success of The Sledge and decided it was time to come out all 'natural'. Unfortunately, this naturalism of theirs revolves around the same kind of talk, the same 'sermyaga coats' which are now inundating our theatrical stage," Verstovsky complained in a December 1854 letter to Gedeonov. That was probably the first time the phrase "sermyaga coat" was applied to Ostrovsky's work, a cliché that dogged him for the rest of his life.

In February 1855 Tsar Nikolai I died and the word 'thaw', first used in the political sense by Fyodor Tyutchev, entered the Russian cultural elite's lexicon. Nikolay Nekrasov's Sovremennik and Alexander Herzen's Kolokol started to gain popularity. Ostrovsky, although wary of radicalism, couldn't fail to respond to this new development. In December 1855 he finished Hangover at Somebody Else's Feast (В чужом пиру похмелье) featuring a noble old teacher Ivanov as the main character and also Tit Titych, a boorish type of a family dictator for whom Ostrovsky coined the term 'samodur' which caught on instantly. "For Ostrovsky the 'samodur' word became what 'nihilist' was for Turgenev or 'oblomovshchina' for Goncharov," biographer Lakshin remarked. The play was premiered in Moscow on 9 January 1856, with Prov Sadovsky as Tit Titych and had massive success. 1855 and 1856 were the years when the once famous Ostrovsky's circle disbanded with Tertiy Filippov joining the pro-Slavophile Russkaya Beseda and Apollon Grigoriev departing to France.

==== Sovremennik years ====
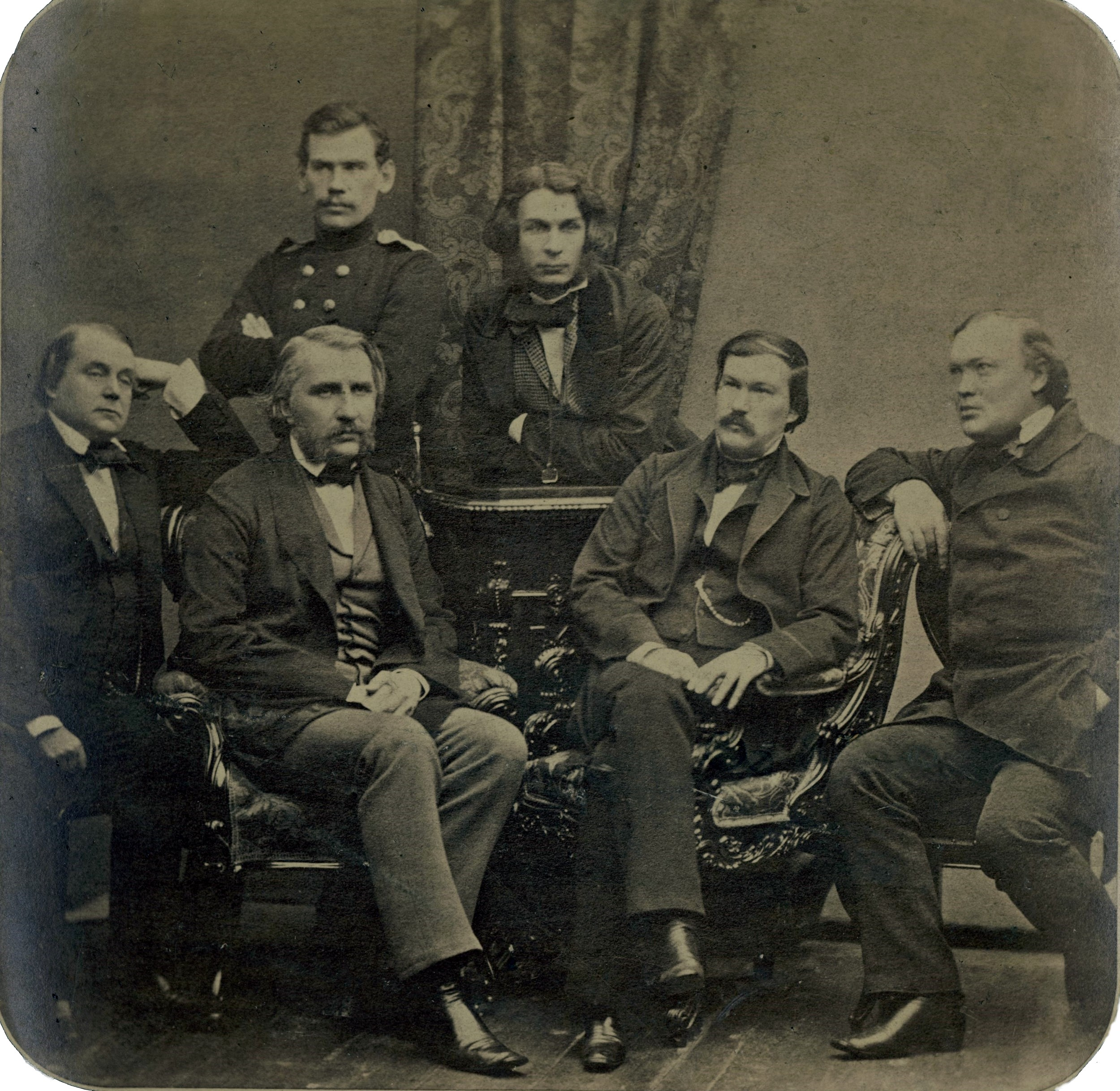
On 15 February 1856, the six Sovremennik authors (excluding Nekrasov who was unwell that day) visited the photographer Sergei Levitsky's studio to sit for a photograph session. Ostrovsky is far right.

Nikolai Nekrasov's team has long been discussing the prospects of tempting Ostrovsky from Moskvityanin over to Sovremennik, and in late 1855 he made a trip to Saint Petersburg to spend most of his time with the authors of that magazine, striking friendship with the young Leo Tolstoy. Nekrasov talked Ostrovsky into signing a four-year contract and published his first play The Pictures of Family Happiness, under the new title The Family Picture, as it has become known since.

In 1856 Grand Duke Konstantin offered several Russian writers an assignment to visit different Russian regions and provide authoritative accounts of both the industrial and everyday life there, originally with the view of gathering some basic data needed for the reformation of the Russian Navy's recruiting system. Ostrovsky (who had to ask for special permission to be added as a volunteer to the list of eight) travelled from the Volga River's beginnings down to Nizhny Novgorod and, apart from collecting the information requested, compiled a dictionary of local terms concerning navigation, shipbuilding and fishery. For the first time in his life he came into contact with the provincial Russian intelligentsia, the people who knew real life and had strong opinions about it. Travelling through poor, often devastated areas made profound effect upon the author who until then knew well only the life of merchants, state officials and minor noblemen.

The trip was marred by two incidents. In May 1856, as the allegations of plagiarism have been made against him in both major cities, based upon his ex-co-author Gorev's accusations, Ostrovsky had to provide his own account of the history of the Family Affair for Moskovsky Vestnik and Sovremennik. Nekrasov supported him; besides, the Russian press' interest in Gorev died out the moment he published his own play Here and There (Сплошь да рядом, Otechestvennye Zapiski, No.56, 1856), to disastrous effect. Then in Kalyazin, Ostrovsky's carriage overturned. He spent two months in bed with a broken leg and had to return home for further treatment. Despite urges from Ivan Panaev to start writing, he returned to Upper Volga in the spring of 1857 and resumed his journey, visiting Rybinsk, Uglich and Nizhny Novgorod in the summer. Eventually Morskoi Sbornik published only one of Ostrovsky's reports. Since this magazine, keen on facts and figures, omitted details it deemed 'too artistic', the author decided to abandon the project entirely. It was while on this trip that Ostrovsky came up with the idea of writing a series of plays called The Nights on the Volga. The project never materialised but numerous real-life stories gathered during this voyage would be used in later plays, notably The Storm. Also based on this material were his 1860s historical dramas Kozma Zakhar'yich Minin-Sukhoruk, The False Dmitry and Vasily Shuysky and Vasilisa Melentyeva, as well as the comedy Voyevoda. After his Volga trip Ostrovsky totally lost interest in the "Slavophile or Westernizer" dilemma and started to develop a deeper understanding of the Russian people and Russia as a whole.

1857 saw the release of A Profitable Position (Доходное место), rated exceptionally high by Leo Tolstoy. "This is a colossal thing in terms of depth, power and relevance and this impeccably real character, Yusov," the latter wrote in a letter. The play had nothing to do with the radical ideas propagated by Sovremennik, but by this time, according to Lakshin, Ostrovsky had developed a different approach to his art: "Would it be worthwhile to wage wars against bribe-takers when they are only part of the way of life where the corruption serves for a hidden mechanism? Wouldn't it be more intriguing to try and get under the skin of these people, learn how their special kind of morality works, expose the logic which helps them find excuses for themselves?" Ostrovsky totally rejected didacticism. "For a statement of truth to be effective and make people wiser, it has to be filtered through the soul of the highest quality, the soul of an artist," he argued.

A Profitable Position's premiere, scheduled for 20 December 1857, was cancelled at the eleventh hour, as censors labelled it as "an opus poking fun at state officials." On the brighter side, the police surveillance over Ostrovsky has been finally lifted, of which the local police chief informed the author personally, visiting him at his home. In September (seven months after it was banned for the second time) the Family Picture was at last declared eligible for being produced by Imperial Theatres. Also in 1857 Celebratory Sleep Is That Before Dinner (Праздничный сон – до обеда) came out, the first part of the Balzamininov trilogy (parts two and three, Two Dogs Fight, the Third Keep Away and Whatever You Look for, You'll Find followed in 1861).

==== 1858–1867 ====
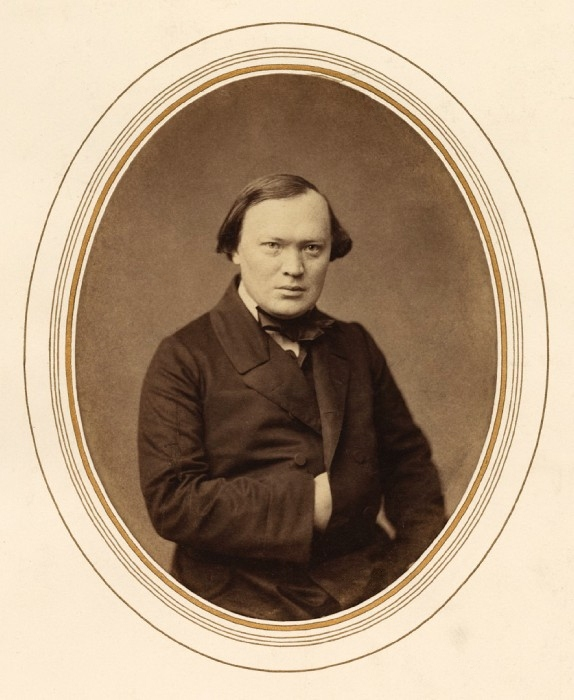
Portrait of Ostrovsky by Sergei Levitsky, 1856

In 1858 Not of the Same Ilk (Не сошлись характерами), originally a novelette, came out. Subtitled "The Picture of the Moscow Life" and telling the story of an impoverished nobleman who marries a rich merchant woman only to be horrified by her stinginess, it was not of Ostrovsky's best. By far more significant was his next one, A Protégée of the Mistress (Воспитанница, 1859), continuing the 'degradation of the nobility' theme and written during his three weeks' visit to Saint Petersburg in 1858. It was banned from being staged on 23 October of the same year by Alexander Timashev after a censor in his report posed a question: "Should we indeed give way to a play showing such immorality in Russian landowners' daily life?"

In 1859 Count Grigory Kushelev-Bezborodko published the first edition of The Works by A.N. Ostrovsky in two volumes. Censored by none other than Ivan Goncharov (who helped to get the Family Affair into the collection), it inspired Nikolai Dobrolyubov to write the first of his two famous essays, hailing Ostrovsky as "a ray of light in the realm of darkness." In November 1859, the author visited Dobrolyubov to thank him personally for what he saw as the first ever proper analysis of his work. "In retrospect one cannot fail to see the polemic nature of [Dobrolyubov's] two articles. Ostrovsky wasn't a satirist, not even a humorist. What he cared for was the objectivity in depicting life... and even among the ugliest things he managed to find beauty," critic P. Morozov wrote half a century later. Ostrovsky himself saw his duty as merely portraying a Russian man the way he saw him. "To have the right to correct other people's wrongs, one has to see clearly the good side of the people too," he argued.

In 1860 came out another play inspired by Ostrovsky's Volga voyage, The Storm, a tragic story of unhappily married Katerina, dominated by the motif of impending hurricane which never comes, the latter interpreted by Dobrolyubov as a metaphor for the social change that the Russian society was now badly in need of. To help the play overcome the censorial barrier Ostrovsky made a trip to the capital and had hard time trying to put it to the censor Nordstrom that Kabanikha (Katerina's vile mother-in-law) was not some caricature of the late Tsar Nikolai I. The Storm was premiered on 16 November 1859, as the actor Sergey Vasilyev's benefit, to enormous public acclaim.

Ostrovsky was greatly upset by the moral climate in both major Imperial theatres (Alexandrinka in particular, corrupted as it was by its closeness to the Court) which seemed to bring out the worst in their actors. One of the few exceptions was Alexander Martynov whom Ostrovsky admired and respected. In the spring of 1860 Martynov, terminally ill with tuberculosis, ventured on a trip down to Odessa and Ostrovsky agreed to follow him as a companion. On the way home, in Kharkov, the actor died. "With Martynov I lost all that I've ever had in Petersburg's theatre," Ostrovsky wrote in a letter to Panayev.

In 1861 Ostrovsky finished Whatever You Look for, You'll Find (За чем пойдёшь, то и найдёшь), the final part of the Balzaminov trilogy (praised among others by Dostoyevsky), and the historical drama in verse, Kozma Zakharyich Minin-Sukhoruk, which took him six years to write. In 1862 the Tsar showed his approval by presenting the author with a golden ring which rather upset Ostrovsky, who saw it as a scant reward for all the pains he had to go through with censors. A year later Minin was banned without an explanation. Rumour had it that the January Uprising in Poland was the reason, making the authorities fear that the play might "agitate the public", either against or for the Poles.

In the spring of 1862 Ostrovsky visited Germany, Austria, Italy, France and England, and returned with the acute feeling of the contrast between the two different time planes that Russia and Europe were living on. (Note: Several years later when The Storm premiered in France and had little success, it was said the French regarded it as a historical, not social drama, for the things it described were typical for the 14th-century France. Mikhail Saltykov-Shchedrin was aware of that too: "For [the West European readership] I am, essentially, a 17th-century author.") In London Ostrovsky visited Alexander Hertzen, although this fact became known only years later through the memoirs of his companion and personal secretary Ivan Gorbunov. In August 1862 he returned to Russia full of new ideas and by the end of the year finished Sin and Sorrow Are Common to All (Грех да беда на кого не живёт). Published by the Dostoyevsky brothers-owned Vremya magazine, it was a drama of strong characters, based on a real-life story related to the author by one of his merchant friends. In Autumn 1863 Ostrovsky finished Difficult Days (Тяжёлые дни), a sequel to the Hangover, telling the story of backward Russian provinces where ignorance rules. It was followed by Jokers (Шутники, 1864) and The Deep (Пучина, 1865), the latter concluding the Zamoskvorechye cycle. One of Ostrovsky's experimental pieces (more a novel than a play, fashioned after the recently translated Thirty Years by Victor Ducange), it suffered from heavy-handed censorial treatment and had little success on stage. In 1865, accompanied again by Ivan Gorbunov, Ostrovsky made another trip down the Volga River.

==== Troubles with censorship ====
By the mid-1860s Ostrovsky's reputation as Russia's leading dramatist has become indisputable. Two of his plays, The Storm and Sin and Sorrow, have earned him the prestigious Uvarov Prize. Yet, being a man of the theatre, he grew more and more frustrated with his plays being banned one after another. He said:

A writer in Russia finds himself in the most peculiar position. Once the play's finished, he sits down again, this time to compose a plea: "I see it as my honour to present such and such play to the directors and humbly implore them to accept it," etc, etc. Then the play, having gone through the censorship, works its way into the Literary and Theatrical committee. Could such a thing be imagined anywhere abroad? Everywhere a play of any merit would be grabbed by any theatre. Instead of writing petitions the author would rather receive ones, directors asking for his work, then giving the green light to it. Here in Russia to write a play is only half the trouble: the main thing is to drag it through all kinds of tribulations.

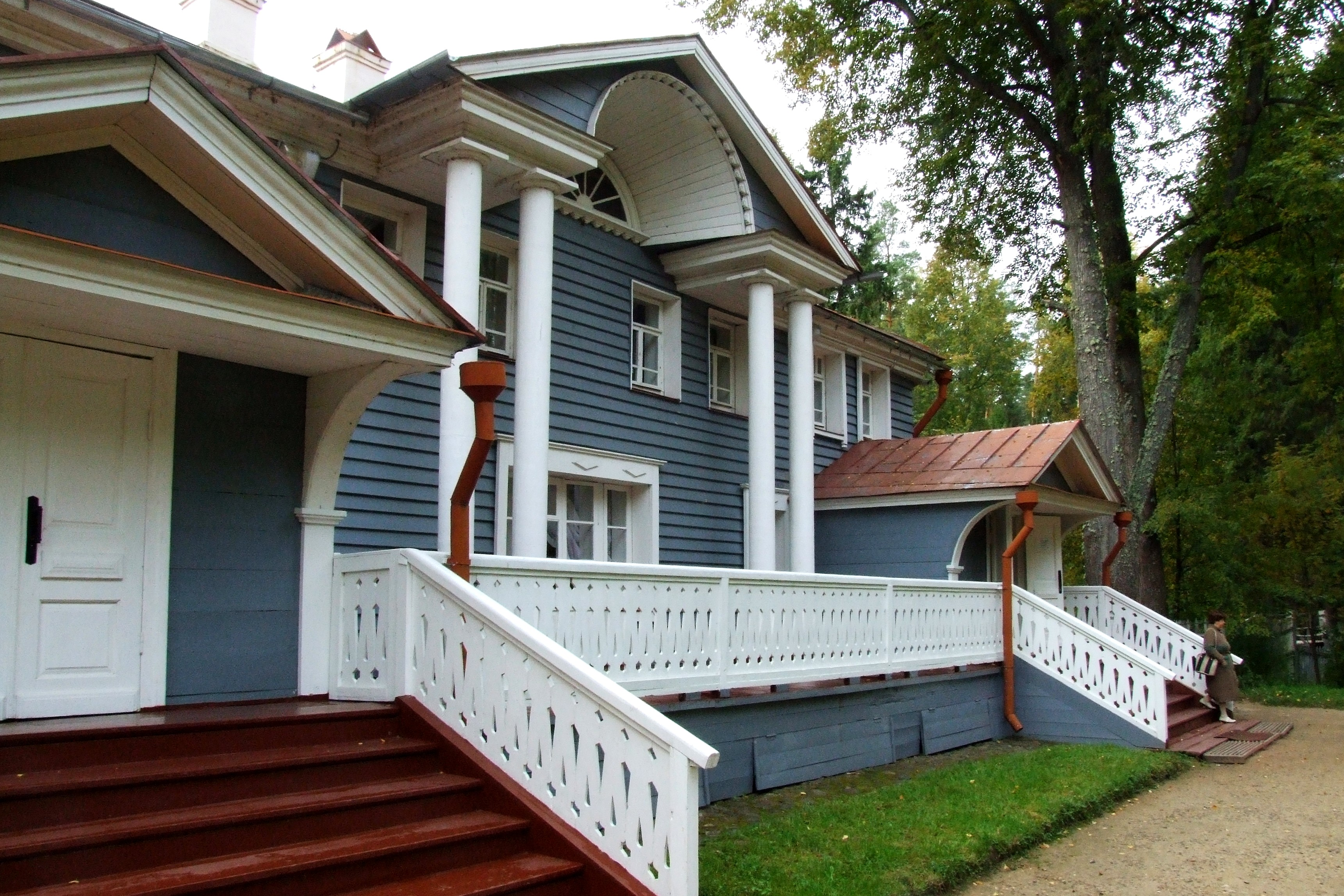
Ostrovsky's Schelykovo house, now a museum

Tsar Alexander II was an avid theatre-goer, but favoured ballet and French vaudeville. "Ostrovsky is a talented man, but his plays for me are unbearable. I come to the theatre to rest from my hard work expecting to be amused, but Ostrovsky's plays leave me depressed and distraught," the Tsar complained, according to the actor Fyodor Burdin. After the much-mangled Minin has found its way back to the Imperial Theatres' stage, Ostrovsky followed on with more historical dramas: Voyevoda (1866), The False Dmitry and Vasily Shuisky (1866) and Tushino (1867). In 1867 Stepan Gedeonov (the official who once helped him with The Sled) became the director of Imperial Theatres and in just six weeks Ostrovsky wrote Vasilisa Melentyeva, using Gedeonov's script. But the 3rd Department suspected some political subversion, Gedeonov failed to provide financial support and the project flopped.

Back in 1846–1847 Ostrovsky's father purchased four estates, the largest of which was Schelykovo in the Kostroma Governorate, the 18th-century mansion built by captain Mikhail Kutuzov. After Nikolai Ostrovsky's death, Alexander with brother Mikhail bought the estate in 1867 from their stepmother. "At last I'll be able... to break free from the soul-rending theatre slavery which devoured the best years of my life," he wrote in a letter. He built a creamery, set up a garden, and even though soon it became clear that this new way of life won't make him any richer, it was here that Ostrovsky spent his happiest days, receiving guests and enjoying bouts of inspiration for new plays. He called Shchelykovo "the Kostroma Switzerland" and insisted that not even in Italy had he ever seen such beauty.

=== 1867–1874 ===
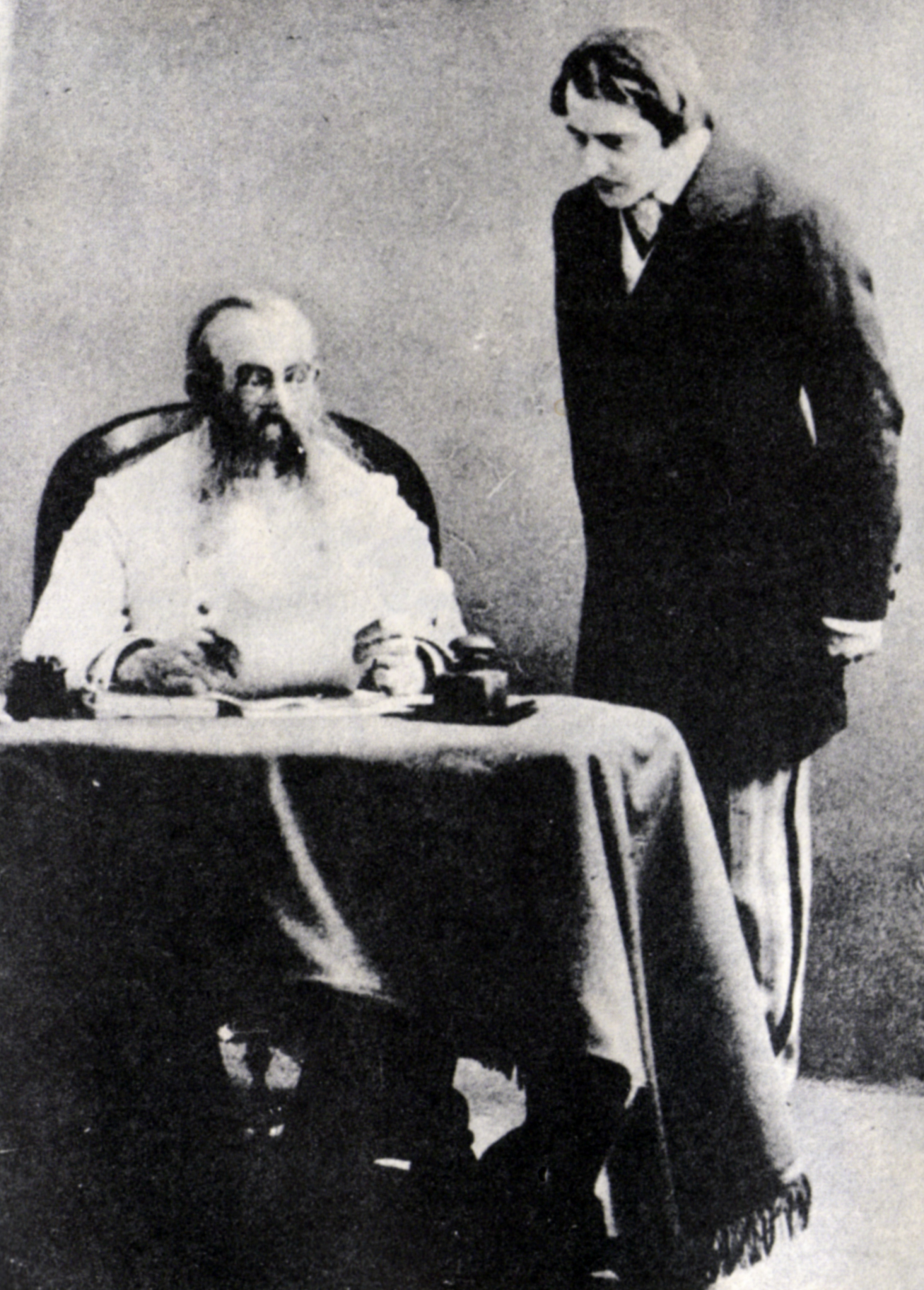
Konstantin Stanislavski and Vasily Kachalov in the Moscow Art Theatre production of Enough Stupidity in Every Wise Man, 1910.

By 1867, Ostrovsky had fallen into depression, feeling worthless and lonely. Tushino (1867), rejected by all the major magazines, could be published only by the humble Vsemirny Trud. After Dmitry Karakozov's assassination attempt, many of Ostrovsky's friends in high places lost their posts. To make ends meet he turned to translations and writing librettos. Things changed when Nekrasov became the head of Otechestvennye Zapiski. Ostrovsky was warmly welcomed in and debuted there in November 1868 with Enough Stupidity in Every Wise Man (На всякого мудреца довольно простоты).

Taking cues from his 'worst enemy' operetta which came from France to conquer Petersburg and drive Ostrovsky's plays from theatre repertoires, he wrote "Ivan-tsarevich", an ironic fairytale, its Russian folklore plot mixed with modern parody and farce. The lack of finance forced Ostrovsky to cancel the project, but the idea was soon revived in Enough Stupidity in Every Wise Man, a pamphlet written in contemporary language but set in Moscow of the old times. It was followed by The Ardent Heart (Горячее сердце, 1869), part detective fiction, part naive fairytale, part modern pamphlet aimed at the Moscow traders buying huge plots of land from aristocrats. The main character Khlynov bore strong resemblance to the Moscow millionaire trader M.A. Khludov, who became famous for his bizarre projects and pranks. The premier of The Ardent Heart in The Maly on 15 January 1869 (a benefit for Prov Sadovsky who played Kuroslepov), was triumphant.

Also in 1869 Mad Money (Бешеные деньги), also translated as "Money to Burn") (Note: This was the first play staged by New Theatre in Leningrad in 1933."Theater them. Lensoveta: repertoire, actors, address". EN.DELACHIEVE.COM. 30 September 2019.) came out, reflecting the author's interest in (and wariness of, too) the new emerging class of capitalist entrepreneurs, 'practical people', as they have become known in Russia. Ostrovsky himself was very impractical, even if he liked to pretend otherwise. "Publishers are crooks and they drink my blood," he used to say. "Nekrasov openly laughed at me and called me an altruist. He said no man of literature would sell their work as cheaply as I do," complained Ostrovsky in a letter. Nekrasov (who paid him 200 rubles per act which was considered a good price) tried to help Ostrovsky in the business of publishing. "But it just happened so that in the end [Ostrovsky] was always losing money... and was constantly on the verge of bankruptcy," Lakshin wrote. Each of his new plays was sent simultaneously to Maly Theatre and Otechestvennye Zapiski. Occasionally the publication preceded the premiere: such was the case with The Forest (Лес, 1871), the story of actors travelling from Vologda to Kerch which satirised the backwardness of the Russian province of the time.

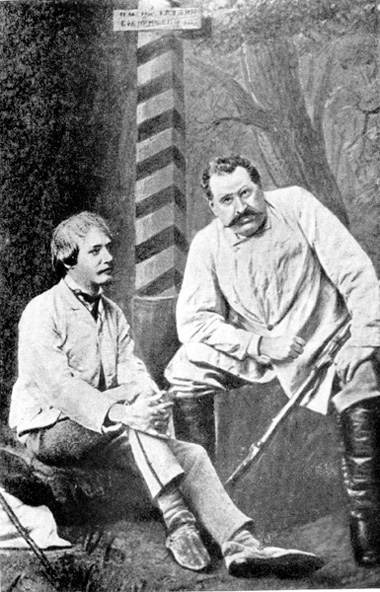
M. Sadovsky and N. Rybakov in The Forest, 1872

Now visiting Petersburg regularly, Ostrovsky was enjoying the parties Nekrasov staged in a fashion of Sovremennik happenings, but for all the thrills of meeting people like Gleb Uspensky and Nikolai Mikhailovsky, in the capital he felt uneasy. One of the plays that were successful in Moscow but failed in Petersburg, was The Ardent Heart, due to the poor quality of the production. In January 1872 Alexander II unexpectedly visited Alexandrinka to watch It's Not All Shrovetide for the Cat (Не всё коту масленница, 1871) and showed no enthusiasm. Gedeonov's efforts to make sure that Ostrovsky should be granted a personal pension, in commemoration of the 25th anniversary of his literary career, came to nothing. The jubilee premiere of the play The False Dmitry and Vasily Shuisky (first published in 1866) on the Mariinsky stage on 17 February 1872 failed to meet expectations. "Costumes shocked everybody with their ruggedness, decorations looked as if they were brought from Berg's puppet show and everything reeked of negligence towards Russian theatre and Russian talents", the Grazhdanin reviewer wrote. The ceremony held behind the stage was a low profile affair with only theatre actors and director Alexander Yablochkin present. Disappointed, Ostrovsky returned to Moscow where he had always been revered as a veteran dramatist and the head of the Russian Dramatists society. Here the celebration was lavish and prolonged. "Ostrovsky for Moscow has become what the Pope means for Rome," Ivan Goncharov wrote.

1872 also saw the release of The 17th Century Comic (Комик семнадцатого столетия), written for the 200th anniversary of the Russian theatre. The play was soon forgotten, but decades later Marina Tsvetayeva praised it as "exemplary in language". A year later one of Ostrovsky's most unusual plays, The Snow Maiden (Снегурочка) came out, based on the myth of the Berendey kingdom with its noble tsar, a poet and an artist. Leo Tolstoy and Nekrasov both loathed the experiment (so it had to be published in Vestnik Evropy) and the Moscow premiere drew a lukewarm response. But the musical community was enthusiastic and it took just three weeks for Pyotr Tchaikovsky to write the music for the stage production. Later Rimsky-Korsakov created the opera of the same name, keeping most of the original text in the libretto.

=== 1874–1880 ===
In the early 1870s Ostrovsky's plays became more experimental, had little success on stage and were more or less disliked by critics. "The Impotence of Creative Thought", the title of Nikolai Shelgunov's article in Delo magazine, reflected the general mood. While in the old days Ostrovsky was criticised for being too epic and paying little attention to form, Late Love (Поздняя любовь, 1873) and Wolves and Sheep (Волки и овцы, 1875), with their perfect inner mechanism of action and technical gloss, were seen as too "French-like in structure." "I am at a loss, being scolded from all sides for my work which I've been totally honest in," Ostrovsky complained to Nekrasov in an 8 March 1874 letter.

Most of Ostrovsky's later plays were based on real life stories. "All of my plots are borrowed, they had been made up by the life itself. A dramatist does not invent stories but writes of things that have happened, or could have happened," Ostrovsky told the dramatist Dmitry Averkiyev. Wolves and Sheep told the story of a real court case involving the denouncement of hegumenness Mitrofania (Baroness Praskovia Rosen in real life) who in October 1874 was sued for fraud. Ostrovsky saw the story of this woman (portrayed as Murzavetskaya in the play) as an unusual mix of extraordinary personal ambitions and religious hypocrisy of somebody he described as 'the Russian Tartuffe in frock.' The Last Victim (Последняя жертва, 1877) told the true story of the actress Yulia Linskaya who left the stage to marry an affluent man, became a rich widow and, left penniless by her younger lover, died in poverty.

Without a Dowry (Бесприданница, 1878) was based on a criminal case dealing with a murder from jealousy, which was going on in the Kineshma court where Ostrovsky had once worked and which he since then often visited. It went unnoticed and only in retrospect is regarded as a precursor to Chekhov's similar line of work. Written especially for the young Alexandrinka actress Maria Savina, it had more success in Petersburg than in Moscow. Revived by Vera Komissarzhevskaya after the author's death, the play, according to Lakshin, "remains a timeless reminder of how deep the chasm between the two sides of success, the artistic and the public one, can be."

In the autumn of 1877 Ostrovsky left his old house at Nicola-Vorobin and moved into a posh and comfortable flat in a house on Prechistenka street. Despite having fallen out of favour with critics, Ostrovsky, a great authority and a theatre patriarch, was continuously visited by young authors seeking his advice and assessment. He discovered several new dramatists, among them Nikolai Solovyov, a monk and a gifted playwright (recommended to him by Konstantin Leontiev) who became the co-author of Belugin's Marriage (Женитьба Белугина, a re-working of Solovyov's Who Could Expect?) and two more plays. Ostrovsky spent now most of his time in his room writing, feeling under increasing pressure due to growing financial demands of his family. "Two or three months of freedom from working and thinking would help me a lot, but this is unthinkable and, as Eternal Jew I am doomed to walk on and on and on," he wrote in 1879. People who visited him in Moscow in his last years were horrified at how jaded he looked.

==== Ostrovsky and Russian theatre reform ====
In 1874 Ostrovsky co-founded The Society of Russian Dramatic Art and Opera Composers which dealt mostly with legal issues and provided financial support for the authors writing for theatre. The Society published plays, organised performances and exerted a strong influence upon the development of the Russian theatre. Prior to this, in 1865, Ostrovsky initiated the formation of the Artists' Circle, a club and an informal drama school. Appalled by the deep crisis the Russian theatre found itself in the 1870s, Ostrovsky worked out a profound plan for its radical reform. In 1881 he came to Petersburg with two reports: "On the Situation in the Modern Drama Art in Russia" and "On the Needs of the Imperial Theatre", and Minister I.I. Vorontsov-Dashkov invited Ostrovsky to join the special governmental committee. Most of his suggestions have been ignored, but at least one idea, that of founding in Moscow the first independent theatre appealed to the Tsar and (even if the Moscow project flopped) soon private theatres started to open all over Russia.

In December 1885, Ostrovsky was appointed the Imperial Theatres' repertoire director. For several months he was busy inspecting productions, having talks, trying to implement the reforms he had been thinking over for years. Driven by the idea of "making the theatre the home of a thinking man" Ostrovsky invited the university professors Nikolai Storozhenko and Nikolai Tikhonravov as well as the dramatist Nikolai Chayev to work on the repertoires. He was helping new authors, firing inadequate officials and trying to fight the all-pervading corruption. According to the biographer Anna Zhuravlyova, Ostrovsky in his later years had every reason to write, as he did: "Other arts have schools, academies, mentors in high places... Russian drama has only myself. I am its everything: the academy, the sponsor and the protector."

=== Last years ===
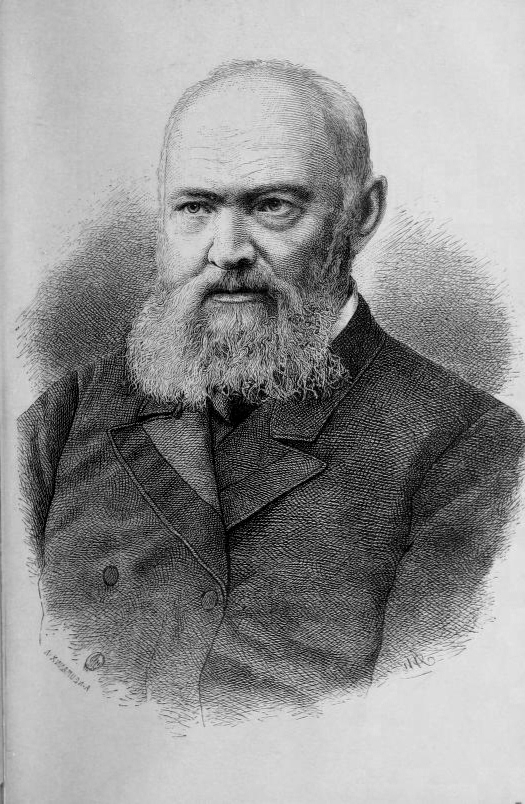
Ostrovsky in 1885

In the autumn of 1883 Ostrovsky made a trip down to the Caucasus. The lavish reception he received in Georgia moved him to tears. Refreshed and full of new hopes, Ostrovsky came back and promptly finished Guilty Without Fault (Без вины виноватые). Back home, though, he found himself in financial trouble again. "I am on the brink, there is no way out: Maria Vasilyevna is ill, all those worries have broken me totally, my heart falters and I often faint. None of the theatres pays me and I am in debt," he wrote to Fyodor Burdin.

In the early 1884 Ostrovsky was finally granted a personal pension from the Court, something he had requested 15 years earlier and had been refused. Mikhail Ostrovsky, now one of Alexander's ministers and a member of the State Council of Imperial Russia, mentioned his brother's financial difficulties to the Tsar and the problem was solved in a minute. Ostrovsky's feelings were mixed, though: 3 thousand rubles a year was not a large sum and there was a tinge of humiliation too in the way it had been obtained. Still on 5 March 1884, Ostrovsky came to the Palace to see Alexander III and had a 15-minute talk with the monarch. The Tsar asked why had the author chosen such a hero for The Handsome Man (Красавец-мужчина), a play about a pimp. "Such is the spirit of our times," Ostrovsky answered simply.

On 28 May 1886, Ostrovsky departed to Schelykovo, feeling already very ill. While staying at an inn he suffered a severe asthma attack. His condition started to quickly deteriorate; he spent his last days in great pain, unable to move. On 2 June Ostrovsky died in his home of angina pectoris while at his desk translating William Shakespeare's Antony and Cleopatra.

Alexander Ostrovsky was buried in the local cemetery in Nikolo-Berezhki. Only close relatives, a couple of old friends, dramatist Nikolai Kropachev and A.A. Maykov (his colleague in the Theatre department and Apollon Maykov's nephew) were present. The ceremony was modest and humble. Brother Mikhail's plans to move the coffin to the Moscow Novodevichye Cemetery remained unfulfilled. "Ostrovsky's life was hard, full of strife, inner suffering and hard work. But he lived it as he wrote about it, being loyal to simple ideals: native land, pure feelings, goodness in people and the source of both happiness and torment in his life, theatre," Lakshin wrote.

== Private life ==
In 1847 Ostrovsky met Agafya Ivanovna, a lower middle-class 24-year-old woman who lived in the Yauza neighborhood, and became close to her. Nothing is known of her, except that her sister's name was Natalya Ivanovna Belenkova (but that second name might have belonged to her husband). According to Lakshin, there was strong possibility that her parents were ex-serfs; in that case her surname most certainly would have been Ivanova.

Despite his father's strong objection, in mid-1849 Ostrovsky, while the family was away, took Agafya into the house as his civil partner. Marriage was out of question and Gasha (as she was known) never demanded that. Ostrovsky apparently wasn't expecting this relationship to be a lasting one, but it proved otherwise and Gasha stayed with him until her death in 1867. Poorly educated, but talented and intelligent woman, she had deep knowledge of the lower classes' life and certainly exerted some influence upon the dramatist.

In the Autumn of 1859, while working upon The Storm Ostrovsky spent some time in Davydkovo and Ivankovo nearby Moscow, the two places of actors' gatherings. It was there that he became romantically involved with the actress Lyubov Nikulina-Kositskaya, whom he apparently had in mind as Katerina. Judging by the extant Kositskaya's letters, Ostrovsky was madly in love, promising to 'elevate' her 'upon a pedestal'; she expressed reservations, reminding her lover of his duties towards his civil partner. After two years of uncertainty Ostrovsky proposed, and Kositskaya rejected him. By this time she has been in love with her young follower Sokolov, a flamboyant merchant's son who first squandered his own money, then started spending hers. This whole affair proved to be a painful and humiliating experience to Ostrovsky.

In the early 1860s Ostrovsky met Maria Vasilyevna Vasilyeva, the Maly Theater actress whom he became close with in 1864. On New Year's Eve she gave birth to a child, Alexander. In August 1866 Mikhail was born; in the end of 1867, a daughter, Maria. On 12 February 1869, Ostrovsky and Vasilyeva married.

== Musical adaptations ==
Several of Ostrovsky's plays have been turned into operas. The play The Storm (Groza) was the inspiration behind Leoš Janáček's opera Káťa Kabanová. The most notable Russian opera based on an Ostrovsky play is Nikolai Rimsky-Korsakov's The Snow Maiden (Snegurochka). Tchaikovsky also wrote incidental music for this play as did Tamara Popatenko, among others. Ostrovsky is known outside of Russian-speaking countries mostly because of these two works.

His 1854 comedy Don't Live as You Like was adapted as the tragic opera The Power of the Fiend (premiered in 1871) by Alexander Serov. The historical drama The Voyevoda (Dream on the Volga) was transformed into two operas: one by Pyotr Tchaikovsky (as The Voyevoda) and later another by Anton Arensky entitled Dream on the Volga. Tchaikovsky also later wrote incidental music for a scene in the play.

== Legacy ==
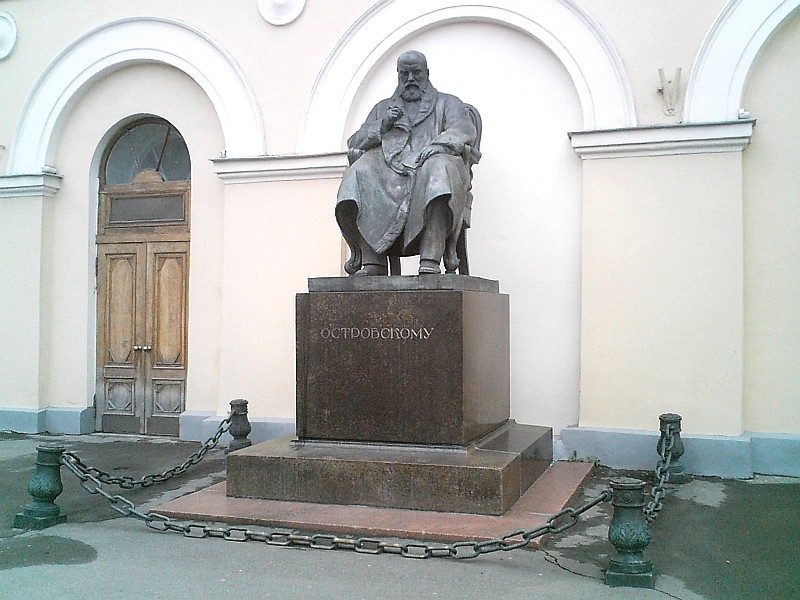
Statue of Ostrovsky beside the Maly Theatre, by sculptor Nikolay Andreyev

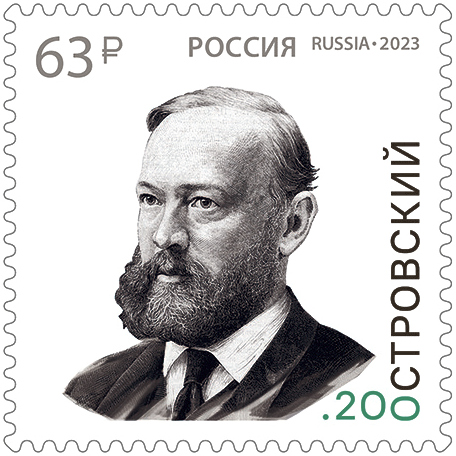
Ostrovsky on a 2023 stamp of Russia

Alexander Ostrovsky is considered one of the most important Russian playwrights of the 19th century, credited with bringing dramatic realism to the Russian theatre stage. His best-known plays, in which he meticulously portrayed the Russian society of his time, focusing on the morals and manners of the newly emerging merchant class, were extremely popular during his lifetime and remain an integral part of the Russian repertoire. They are esteemed for their skillful characterization and use of dialect.

Ostrovsky wrote 47 original plays featuring 728 characters, "a real word of its own where some figures might seem similar, but no two of them are the same," according to Y. Kholodov. "Ostrovsky's world was exceptionally diverse, as was his set of formats: he's written dramas, historical chronicles, scenes of Moscow life, a spring fairytale and a dramatic etude... His legacy could be seen as one endless play set on one stage, that of Russia of the last three centuries," the critic continued. His work divided the critics, and while Apollon Grigoriev enthused about their originality and Nikolai Dobrolyubov praised their social straightforwardness, some (like Nikolai Chernyshevsky) criticised the author of being maudlin and sentimental as regards patriarchal habits and ways. Politically neutral critics and the theatre community especially, though, loved his work and the best Russian stage stars, like Sadovsky, S. Vasilyev, Stepanov, Kositskaya and Borozdina were totally on his side.

Some scholars expressed doubts as to the existence of the actual piece of paper on which Nikolai Gogol has allegedly scribbled the words of encouragement to the young dramatist, but in retrospect most of them agreed that regardless of that Ostrovsky came as a direct heir to Gogol's tradition of realism, humanism and closeness to folk culture and language. Ostrovsky was foreign to pastel colours and undertones, subtlety was not his thing. Critics used to compare his scenes to paintings by Pavel Fedotov. His was juiciness of natural brightness, dramatism, strong emotions, bright humour and unforgettable, lavishly painted characters. Ostrovsky was regarded as a master of language. Back in 1859 Nikolai Dobrolyubov (in his Realm of Darkness essay) remarked that many phrases he coined were being eagerly adopted by people and became folk sayings, part of common people talk. "Nobody has had such glorious, tasteful and clear Russian language before Ostrovsky," Turgenev wrote.

A master of the realistic drama, Ostrovsky was praised for his insight into the psychology of the Russian people, and many of his well-drawn characters are favorites among Russian actors and audiences. While international recognition of his talent has been limited by the difficulties of translating his heavily idiomatic dialogue, his contributions remain central to the development of modern Russian drama.

Ostrovsky never kept diaries, discussed only practical affairs in his letters and never meant them to be preserved. In 1879 he said in a Russkaya Starina interview: "I've been for quite a while cherishing a dream of how after all I'll start a book of memoirs and relax a bit, enjoying myself, but now I know for sure this will remain nothing more than a dream. To put my reminiscences in order I need some rest and peace – two things I haven't got and never will have." Most of Ostrovsky's letters disappeared. In Shchelykovo the huge bulk of documents has been destroyed through negligence. The first academic works dealing with Ostrovsky and his legacy started to appear only in the Soviet era, via scholars N. Kashin, N. Dolgov, A. Revyakin, A. Lotman, E. Kholodov and V. Lakshin. Many gaps remain, unconfirmed dates and uncorroborated facts in his biography, according to the latter.

Unlike those of his contemporaries Tolstoy, Dostoevsky, and Turgenev, Ostrovsky's works are little known outside of Russian-speaking countries. The two that are fairly well known in the West became so mostly because they were adapted for operas: Katya Kabanova (based on The Storm), and "The Snow Maiden" by Rimsky-Korsakov. Ostrovsky wrote mostly of the conservative "old Russia", the traditional Russian society—of the everyday life of merchants and poor city dwellers—the subjects that seemed to attract little interest in the West.

The Ostrovsky Institute was founded in Tashkent, Uzbekistan, in 1945, which grew into the Uzbekistan State Institute of Arts and Culture.

The Ostrovsky Leningrad Theatre Institute was founded in Leningrad, and merged with the Leningrad Institute of Art History in 1961 to become the Leningrad Institute of Theatre, Music and Cinematography, now the St Petersburg Institute of Theatre, Music and Cinematography.
