= Sin and Sorrow Are Common to All =

1863 play by Alexander Ostrovsky

- Written by: Aleksander Ostrovsky
- Original language: Russian
- Genre: Social drama

Premiere
- Date premiered: 21 January 1863
- Place premiered: Maly Theatre in Moscow

Sin and Sorrow Are Common to All (Grekh da beda na kovo ne zhiviot, Грех да беда на кого не живёт) is a four-act drama by Alexander Ostrovsky, written in 1862 and published on the No. 1, 1863 issue of Vremya magazine, edited by the Dostoyevsky brothers. It premiered in the Maly Theatre in Moscow, on 21 January 1863, as a benefit for director Alexander Bogdanov. Later that year, Ostrovsky was awarded the Uvarov Prize for it.

== Background ==
In mid-1862, Ostrovsky returned from his European voyage which, according to biographer Vladimir Lakshin, made him "more enlightened and wise", giving even more poignancy to "his love-hate relations with the Russian [national] character... Love for all of our generosity, impracticality, tolerance, openness to goodness. Hatred for backwardness, moral ignorance, samodurstvo [domestic tyranny] and the eagerness to succumb for the darkest of passions".

== History ==
Ostrovsky started working on the new play on 25 October 1862, in his house at Nikolo-Vorobin Lane. One of his friends Goryachev, a young merchant and a theatre fan, whom the dramatist admired for his energy, moral strength and physical power, told him the story of his life, which served as a base for this drama's plot. "This is the true [Russian] nature, not samodurstvo. This man doesn't want things by halves", wrote Fyodor Dostoyevsky of the play's main hero Lev Krasnov. According to biographer Vladimir Lakshin, Rogozhin in Dostoyevsky's The Idiot bore similarities to Krasnov.

The play premiered at the Moscow's Maly Theatre on 21 January 1853, with Prov Sadovsky as Lev Krasnov. On 23 January. it was performed in Saint Petersburg's Alexandrinsky Theatre, with Pavel Vasilyev. Both actors provided high quality, inspirational work, and several Russian critics were so impressed as to compare Ostrovsky to Shakespeare.

Ostrovsky's intention was to keep loyal to Sovremennik, but since his return from Europe Nikolai Chernyshevsky has been imprisoned and Nekrasov's magazine got closed for eight months. That was the reason why Sin and Grief Are Common to All was published by Vremya (No. 1, 1863).
