= Fyodor Burdin =

Russian actor (1827–1887)

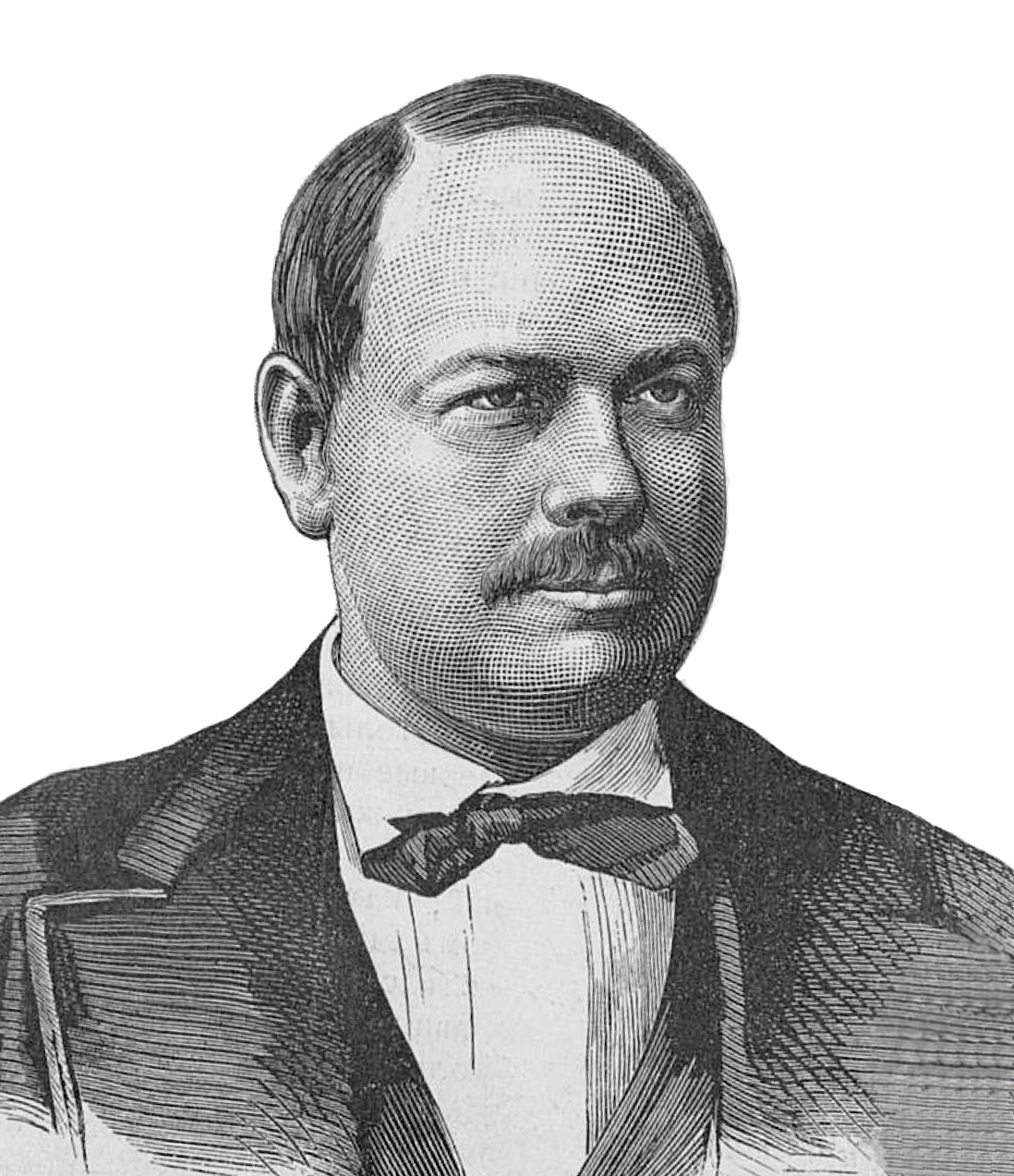
- Burdin by Pyotr Borel; Vsemirnaya Illustratsiya, 1875
- Born: Fyodor Alexeyevich Burdin; April 11, 1827; Moscow, Russian Empire
- Died: February 24, 1887 (aged 59); Moscow, Russian Empire
- Occupation: stage actor

Fyodor Alexeyevich Burdin (Russian: Фёдор Алексеевич Бурдин, April 11, 1827 in Moscow, Russian Empire – February 24, 1887 in Moscow) was a Russian actor, best remembered for his parts in the Alexandrinsky Theatre productions of plays by his best friend Alexander Ostrovsky, whose rise to fame had a lot to do with Burdin's enthusiasm about the playwright's work, his connections in high places and considerable entrepreneurial talents.

== Career ==
Burdin, who routinely staged in his home the premiere readings of Ostrovsky's plays and took upon himself the role of their primal reviewer, enjoyed the right to choose the leading parts for himself, which he often did at the expense of productions' quality. Lauded for his role as a catalyst in the general development of the Russian theatre in the mid-19th-century, Burdin the actor was unpopular with theatre critics, notably Apollon Grigoriev who coined the term 'burdinism' to denote what he saw as the contemporary Russian stage actors' worst flaws: pompousness and penchant for banality.

Burdin translated numerous French vaudevilles; several 'originals' that he wrote were, in effect, re-makes of the current French theatre repertoire. In 1876 his 2-volume Collection of Plays Translated from French came out in Saint Petersburg. He also authored the Brief Textbook of the Art of Drama (1886, Moscow), addressed to the young actors, as well as several memoirs, including "Emperor Nikolay Pavlovich as Remembered by an Actor" (Воспоминания артиста об императоре Николае Павловиче, Istorichesky Vestnik, 1886. Vol. 23. No. 1) and "Remembering A. N. Ostrovsky" (Из воспоминаний об А. И. Островском, Vestnik Evropy, 1886, No. 12).
