= Kondraty Efimovich =

Russian playwright and theatre critic

- Born: Кондратий Дмитриевич Ефимович; 1815; Russian Empire
- Died: 1847 (aged 31–32); Saint Petersburg, Russian Empire

Kondraty Dmitrievich Efimovich (Russian: Кондратий Дмитриевич Ефимович, 1815–1847) was a Russian playwright and theatre critic, also known under his pen name Ivan Ralyanch (Иван Ралянч).

Having debuted in 1844 with Espanioletto, or Father and Artist (its Alexandrinsky Theatre production panned by both Nekrasov and Belinsky), Efimovich soon eschewed melodrama in favour of stark realism and in the course of the next two years developed into a sophisticated author, sensitive to Russian lower classes' real life problems, as well as language. Efimovich has been credited as a master of psychological drama of his time, an exponent of the then popular natural school and a follower of Gogol. In 1846 he chose to dramatize the latter's Taras Bulba only to get himself in trouble with censors who sensed there too much sympathy for the old Cossacks' defiance of the law and order. Efimovich was also an emerging theatre critic whose reviews appeared regularly in the leading Saint Petersburg journals during the last two years of his life.
