= Kornely Poltavtsev =

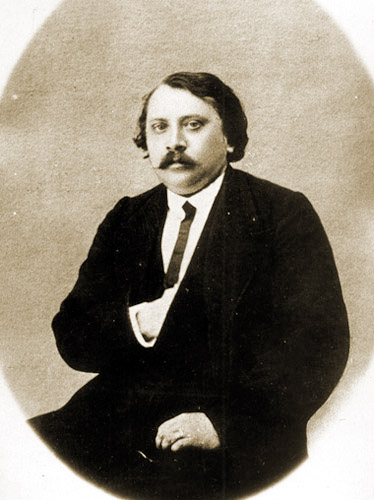
- Born: Корнелий Николаевич Полтавцев; 1823; Kursk, Imperial Russia
- Died: 10 January 1865 (aged 41–42); Moscow, Imperial Russia
- Occupation: stage actor

Kornely Nikolayevich Poltavtsev (Russian: Корнелий Николаевич Полтавцев; 1823 in Kursk, Imperial Russia – 10 January 1865 in Moscow, Imperial Russia) was a Russian stage actor, associated with Moscow's Maly Theatre.

A Moscow Shchepkin Institute graduate, Poltavtsev debuted in Maly in 1842. Three years later he left Moscow and embarked upon a tour through provincial theatres staying for couple of years in each city: Odessa (1845–1846), Kishinev (1846–1847), Taganrog and Rostov-on-Don (1848–1849), Voronezh and Tula (1849–1850), to some critical acclaim. In 1850 he returned to Moscow and became an overnight success with Nestor Kukolnik's Prince Mikhail Vasilyevich Skopin-Shuysky, where he played Lyapunov, the part previously associated with Pavel Mochalov. Since then Poltavtsev have been only cementing his reputation of an heir to Mochalov's legacy, since all the parts that had made predecessor famous would gradually form the best part of his stage repertoire.

Kornely Poltavtsev gave his most memorable performances in plays by William Shakespeare (King Lear, Othello, Coriolanus), Friedrich Schiller (Ferdinand, Intrigue and Love), and Alexander Ostrovsky (Khorkov, The Poor Bride). Poltavtsev gave his final performance for Maly in 1865 as Dubrovin in Ostrovsky's Voyevoda. He died a year later and is interred in Pyatnitskoye cemetery.
