= A Profitable Position =

- Written by: Aleksander Ostrovsky
- Original language: Russian
- Subject: Corruption, bribery, social conflict
- Genre: Social drama

Premiere
- Date premiered: 27 September 1863
- Place premiered: Maly Theatre in Moscow

A Profitable Position (Dokhodnoye mesto, Доходное место) is a play by Alexander Ostrovsky. It was first published in No.1, January 1857 issue of Russkaya Beseda and came out as a separate edition later that year. Banned from being produced at the Russian Imperial theatres, it was premiered only six years later, on September 27, 1863, in Saint Petersburg's Alexandrinsky Theatre as a benefice for actress Elizaveta Levkeyeva. On October 14 of the same year it was performed in Maly Theatre, as actress Ekaterina Vasilieva's benefice.

== History ==
Ostrovsky wrote A Profitable Position at his Moscow home, lying there with a broken leg after the incident during his Volga trip. Taking bribery and corruption as its themes, the play was eagerly anticipated by Sovremennik and its followers, but it was not a straightforward social critique. According to biographer Lakshin, Ostrovsky's approach was now different: "Is it worthwhile to wage ardent wars against certain bribe-takers when they are only part of the way of life with corruption serving as its hidden mechanism? Wouldn't it be more intriguing to try and penetrate under the skin of these people, learn how their special kind of morality works, expose the logic of their excuses?" Ostrovsky loathed tendentious drama and shied didacticism. "To pronounce a clever and honest word is not such a big deal, lots of them have been said and written. For a statement of truth to be effective and for it to make people wiser, it has to be filtered through the soul of a highest quality, that of an artist," he used to say, according to Mikhail Ippolitov-Ivanov.

Ostrovsky published A Profitable Position in Russkaya Beseda where he had some unfulfilled obligations, notably, Minin, promised and never delivered. Ivan Panaev deplored the fact that "such a thing had been published not by Sovremennik" and Leo Tolstoy reproached his friend for having given "such a brilliant comedy to the raskolniks' journal". Nikolai Chernyshevsky greeted the play warmly in his Magazines review, comparing it favourably to the Family Affair.

A Profitable Position's premiere was scheduled on December 20, 1857, but the show was cancelled at the eleventh hour, censors labeling it "an opus poking fun at state officials." The real reason, according to Vasily Botkin, was that "it examined the thin line between honesty and corruption," showing bribery to be not an isolated vice but part of a serious social malaise.

== Reception ==
Leo Tolstoy rated A Profitable Position exceptionally high. "This is a colossal thing in terms of depth, power and relevance and in particular for this impeccably credible character of Yusov," he wrote in a letter. Both liberal and radical critics were unhappy with the finale, the former expecting a Zhadov's triumph, the latter eager to see him fall. "It is possible that the optimistic finale was meant to avoid the anticipated censorial troubles," Lakshin wrote.
