= Sergey Vasilyev (actor) =

Russian stage actor

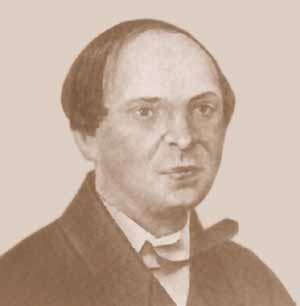
- Born: Сергей Васильевич Васильев; September 19, 1827; Moscow, Russian Empire
- Died: June 17, 1862 (aged 34); Moscow, Russian Empire
- Occupation: stage actor

Sergey Vasilyevich Vasilyev (Russian: Сергей Васильевич Васильев; 19 September 1827 in Moscow, Imperial Russia – 17 June 1862 in Moscow, Imperial Russia) was a Russian stage actor, a mid-19th century star of the Moscow Maly Theatre.

== Career ==
Originally a comic actor, in 1844–1853 Vasilyev played 150 vaudevillian parts at the Maly. "Vasilyev's [was] Russian theatre's not just the best but the only true Khlestakov," Prov Sadovsky argued. In the 1850s he became more involved in serious Russian drama, and Alexander Ostrovsky once remarked that it was in Vasilyev that "he'd found 'a perfect performer, one of those actors whom drama authors so eagerly look for and so rarely meet'." On 16 November 1859, Ostrovsky's best-known play The Storm was premiered at Maly, as a benefit for Vasilyev (who played Tikhon on this particular occasion).
