= Yulia Linskaya =

Russian actress (1820–1871)

Yulia Nikolayevna Linskaya
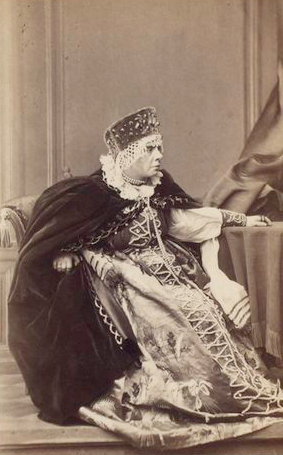
- Linskaya on stage in 1865
- Born: Юлия Николаевна Линская; May 28, 1820; Saint Petersburg, Russian Empire
- Died: May 7, 1871 (aged 50); Saint Petersburg, Russian Empire
- Occupation: actress
- Years active: 1841-1860s

Yulia Nikolayevna Linskaya (Russian: Юлия Николаевна Линская, née Korobyina, Коробьина; 28 May 1820, Saint Petersburg, Russian Empire, — 7 May 1871, Saint Petersburg, Russian Empire) was a Russian stage actress, associated with Aleksandrinsky Theatre.

== Career ==
Educated at the Prince Alexander Shakhovskoy's troupe as a dramatic actress, Linskaya debuted in 1841 at the Aleksandrinsky Theatre in the production of Parasha the Siberian. For ten years she served at the theatre failing to make an impact, then retired and returned in 1854, again to little acclaim. In the early 1860s, having totally re-invented herself as a comic actress, she achieved huge success in Alexander Ostrovsky's plays, portraying rough-edged mistresses, brutish house-holders, sly matchmakers and tyrannical rich merchants' wives.

A successful actress and in her prime an affluent woman, Linskaya died in poverty aged 51, catastrophic marriage said to be the cause of bankruptcy and physical decline. She is interred in Saint Petersburg's Novodevichy Cemetery.
