= The Storm (Ostrovsky) =

1859 play by Alexander Ostrovsky

- Cover of the 1950 Russian edition
- Original language: Russian
- Written by: Aleksandr Ostrovsky
- Genre: Realistic drama

Premiere
- Date: 16 November 1859
- Place: Maly Theatre in Moscow

The Storm (Russian: Гроза, sometimes translated as The Thunderstorm) is a drama in five acts by the 19th-century Russian playwright Aleksandr Ostrovsky. As with Ostrovsky's other plays, The Storm is a work of social criticism, which is directed particularly towards the Russian merchant class.

== History ==
Ostrovsky wrote the play between July and October 1859. He read it in Lyubov Nikulina-Kositskaya's Moscow flat to the actors of the Maly Theatre to a great response. To make sure the play makes it through censorship barrier the author made a trip to the capital where he had a hard time convincing censor Nordstrom that in Kabanikha he hadn't shown the late Tsar Nikolai I. It was premiered on November 16, 1859, as actor Sergey Vasiliev's benefit and enjoyed warm reception.

In Saint Petersburg the play was being produced, as in Moscow, under the personal supervision of its author. Katerina there was played by young and elegant Fanny Snetkova who gave lyrical overtones to the character. In both cities the play angered most of the theatre critics but appealed to audiences and was a tremendous box office success.

== Reception ==
The Storm provoked fierce debate in the Russian press of the time concerning moral issues. While Vasily Botkin was raving about "the elemental poetic force emerging from secret depths of a human soul... for Katerina's love is a woman's nature thing exactly in the way that any of climatic cataclysm is a thing of physical nature", critic Nikolai Filippov lambasted the play as an "example of vulgar primitivism", calling Katerina "shameless" and the scene of rendezvous in Act III "scabrous". Mikhail Shchepkin was highly skeptical too, especially about "those two episodes that take place behind the bushes". Stepan Shevyryov wrote about the decline of a Russian comedy and drama, which was "sliding down the ranking stairs" to the bottom of social hierarchy.

== Characters ==
Character	Description
Savil Prokofievitch Dikoy (lit. Wild)	A merchant, and personage of importance in the town
Boris Grigorievitch	Dikoy's nephew, a young man of good education
Marfa Ignatievna Kabanova (lit. Boar)	A rich merchant's widow
Tihon Ivanitch Kabanov	Marfa's son
Katerina	Tihon's wife
Varvara	Tihon's sister
Kuligin	A man of artisan class, a self-taught watchmaker, engaged in trying to discover the secret of perpetual motion
Vania Kudryash (lit. Curly)	A young man, clerk to Dikoy
Shapkin	An artisan
Feklusha	A piligrim woman
Glasha	A maid servant in the Kabanov's house
An Old Lady	An old lady of seventy, half mad, with two footmen
Townspeople of both sexes	

== Adaptations ==
=== Cinematic adaptations ===
- Vladimir Petrov's 1934 Russian film Groza.

=== Musical adaptations ===
- 1864: Pyotr Ilyich Tchaikovsky wrote an overture, The Storm, which was first performed in 1896. He also reworked this music into his Concert Overture in C minor, which was first performed in 1931.
- 1867: The Storm, Vladimir Nikitich Kashperov (libretto based directly on the play)
- 1921: Káťa Kabanová, Leoš Janáček (libretto by Vincenc Červinka)
- 1940: The Storm, Boris Asafiev
- 1940: The Storm, Ivan Dzerzhinsky
- 1941: The Storm, Viktor Nikolayevich Trambitsky (February 11, 1895–August 13, 1970)
- 1952: The Storm, Lodovico Rocca
- 1962: The Storm, Venedikt Pushkov (October 31, 1896–January 25, 1971)

== Sources ==
- Marsh, Cynthia. 1982. "Ostrovsky's play The Thunderstorm." In Leoš Janáček, Káťa Kabanová by John Tyrrell. Cambridge: Cambridge UP. ISBN 0-521-23180-9.
