= It's a Family Affair-We'll Settle It Ourselves =

- Original language: Russian
- Written by: Aleksander Ostrovsky
- Genre: Comedy

Premiere
- Date: 9 December 1860
- Place: Maly Theatre in Moscow

It's a Family Affair-We'll Settle It Ourselves (Russian: Свои люди - сочтемся, Romanized as Svoi lyudi - sotchtemsya) is a comedy by Alexander Ostrovsky. It was his first major work, written in 1849 and published in the No.6 (March, book 2) 1850 Moskvityanin issue. Having caused a furore, it was banned by the Imperial Theatres' censorship committee and was staged for the first time on 9 December 1860, ten years after its publication. For some time the play has been also referred to as The Bankrupt, which was its original title.

== Background ==
After his attempt to write a play called The Legal Request (Исковое прошение) failed Ostrovsky started working upon another storyline, again stemming from his experience in the Moscow commercial court. Uncertain in his own potential, he invited a friend, Tertiy Filippov, to become a co-author, but the latter refused. Then Dmitry Gorev (real surname Tarasenko) emerged, the son of a merchant who lived not far from the Ostrovskys' (and later turned bankrupt), who published a drama called Tzar the Liberator or the Poor Orphan in 1843. It was Gorev who suggested that they should work upon the play together. Several scenes of Act 1 finished, Gorev suddenly left Moscow and has not been seen there until 1853 when he re-emerged to accuse Ostrovsky of "stealing" the text he, Gorev, had been the co-author of.

== History ==
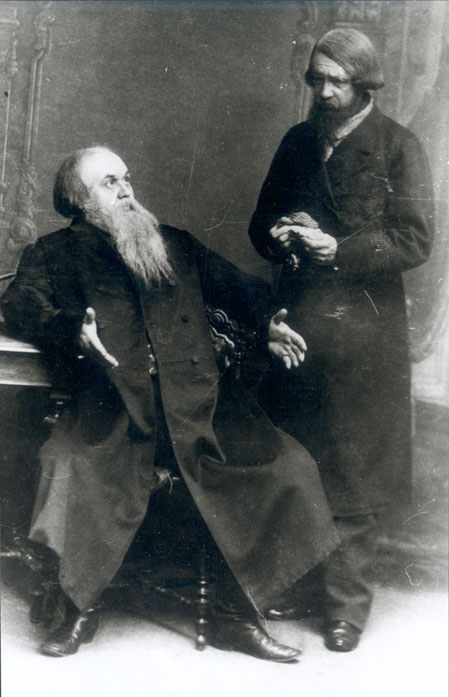
Konstantin Rybakov (Bolshov) and Mikhail Sadovsky (Podkhalyuzin) in the 1892 production

Ostrovsky was working on The Bankrupt all through 1847 and 1848. By the end of 1849 it has been finished. Ostrovsky's first audience was his University friend Alexey Pisemsky. He also met the now famous actor Prov Sadovsky who, much impressed, started to recite the play to his literary friends in Moscow. In the summer Ostrovsky read the play at Mikhail Katkov's in Merzlyakovsky Lane where another Moscow University professor, Ilya Belyaev, was also present. Both Ostrovsky and Sadovsky started to receive invitations to the houses of Moscow cultural elite (Nikolai and Karolina Pavlovs, Alexander Veltman, professors Stepan Shevyryov and Mikhail Pogodin, at Meshchersky's and Sheremetyev's, even in the astronomer Alexander Drashusov's observatory where they became frequent guests since the autumn of 1849. Ivan Goncharov, who was in Moscow on his way from Saint Petersburg to Simbirsk, has heard the Bankrupt, liked it a lot and advised Ostrovsky to send the play to Krayevsky's Otechestvennye Zapiski. The author decided against it, still hoping to get the censorship permission first.

In November 1849 Sadovsky read the play at the house of Countess Rostopchina who called it "our Russian Tartuffe" and expressed her delight with being the witness to "the birth of our own theatre literature." Rostopchina's opinion impressed Pogodin and he asked Nikolai Berg to invite Ostrovsky to his home. On December 3 Ostrovsky read the play to the audience which included Veltman, Lev Mei, the actor Shchepkin and, notably, Nikolai Gogol. The success was immense although at least one of the guests, Veltman, expressed his reservations, complaining about the duration of the event.

The play was published in the March (No. 6) issue of Moskvityanin under the new title It's a Family Affair-We'll Settle It Ourselves and made Ostrovsky famous in Moscow. "The Bankrupt caused furor in the city," Moskvityanin editor-in-chief Mikhail Pogodin wrote in a diary on March 20, four days after the No.6 issue of the magazine came out. Governor Zakrevsky himself supported the play's theatrical production. Then the situation changed.

The success of the play which satirized the uncultured, self-satisfied merchant class outraged some influential people and the reports "started to fly to Petersburg," as the actor (and later Ostrovsky's publisher) Modest Pisarev attested. The Theatre and Literature censorial committee banned the play, condemning its negativism, pessimism and the lack of "positive examples," even if admitting that it contained nothing that would abuse the censorial rules directly. Nicholas I, having signed this document, left upon it a hand-written enquiry: "Who is this Ostrovsky, the author of the Family Affair?" One of his aides, Count Orlov, forwarded this request to the 3rd Department's Moscow office and the city's secret police put the man who was still working in the court under surveillance.

In a letter to the Minister of Education Ostrovsky admitted the play might have been flawed, but added: "Comedy, as far as my principles are concerned, is the best genre in terms of achieving high moral goals, I see it as the best way for me to reproduce real life and so I felt I had to write - either a comedy or nothing. I am convinced that God gives one talent to some purpose and this involves certain responsibilities... For the time will come when every one of us will have to answer this question: 'What have I done with the talent I've been given?'" Countess Rostopchina passed this text to Gogol. "I find his answer most sensible. God help him in his future work and let all doubts be dispelled as to the goodness of his intentions," the later wrote back.

Rather frightened by the official reaction, Ostrovsky visited Zakrevsky. "This only gives you more honour," the Governor reassured the young author, meaning apparently that the Moscovites admired those of their intellectuals who fell out of favour with the authorities in Saint Petersburg. Very soon Ostrovsky discovered he was indeed becoming highly popular with the Moscow cultural elite. On 9 May 1850 he was invited to Gogol's birthday party.

In 1860 Family Affair was finally declared eligible for the theatre production. The reason for the permission was two-fold: Ostrovsky agreed to make several changes and the general state of the Imperial Theatres' repertoire has been recognized in the report as quite deplorable. In the early 1861 the Family Affair was premiered in Saint Petersburg as Yulia Linskaya's benefice and enjoyed great success. Two weeks later it was staged by Maly Theatre in Moscow, with Prov Sadovsky (as Podkhalyuzin) using his skillful art of gesticulation to express without words some of the things the author had been forced to cut out. Both Ostrovsky and the troupe were given long ovation and several hundred people followed the dramatist and his friends to his house.

== Characters ==
Character	Description
Samson Silych Bolshov (lit. Samson Strengthson Bigman)	A merchant
Agrafena Kondratyevna	Bolshov's wife
Olimpiada "Lipochka"	Bolshov's daughter
Lazar Elizarych Podkhalyuzin (lit. Lazar Elizarych Sneaky)	Bolshov's clerk
Ustinya Naumovna	A professional match-maker
Sysoy Psoich Rispolozhensky (lit. Sysoy Dogson Unfrocked)	A lawyer
Fominishna	A housekeeper in Bolshov's house
Tishka	An errand boy in Bolshov's house
