= Lyubov Nikulina-Kositskaya =

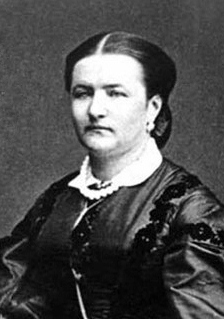
- Born: Lyubov Pavlovna Kositskaya; 27 August 1827; Nizhny Novgorod, Russian Empire,
- Died: 17 September 1868 (aged 41); Moscow, Russian Empire
- Occupations: actress, memoirist
- Years active: 1846-1868
- Spouse: Ivan Nikulin

Lyubov Pavlovna Nikulina-Kositskaya (Russian: Любо́вь Па́вловна Нику́лина-Коси́цкая, 27 August 1827 – 17 September 1868) was a Russian theatre actress, best known for her work in the Maly Theater, notably in Alexander Ostrovsky's plays.

== Biography ==
Kositskaya was born in the village of Zhdanovka nearby Nizhny Novgorod to a family of Russian serf peasants. "We were part of the household of a master whom people were calling the Dog. We, as children, were scared even by the sound of his name, for he was for us the embodiment of horror. I was born in his house which stood on land soaked with peasant blood and tears," she wrote in her posthumously published memoirs. At the age of fourteen she found work in Nizhny Novgorod as a housemaid for a merchant woman, named Dolganova, who paid for her primary education. It was in Dolganova's house that Kositskaya debuted as an amateur actress, discovering she'd got a fine singing voice too.

In April 1844, against her mother's will, Kositskaya joined the Nizhny Theater where she was engaged in roles of peasant girls and servant maids and also sang in operas by Weber and Verstovsky. She came to Moscow with a view to becoming an opera star but found herself first in a drama school, then, through Mikhail Shchepkin's recommendation, in Maly Theatre. Here Kositskaya married actor Ivan Nikulin, who was her second husband. The marriage proved to be an unhappy one.

Kositskaya debut at Maly Theatre in 1847, to much acclaim. In her first season she played Parasha (Parasha the Syberian by Nikolai Polevoy), Luisa (Intrigue and Love by Friedrich Schiller), Ophelia (Hamlet by William Shakespeare), Mikaela (Daughter of Karl the Brave, by Vladimir Zotov). Critics praised her performances in melodramas, admitting her vaudevillian abilities were limited. In the early 1850s she failed as Masha in Ivan Turgenev's The Bachelor (Schepkin's benefice) and people started talking openly of her decline.

The revival of Kositskaya-Nikulina's career started when for her benefice she chose Alexander Ostrovsky's sixth play (and the first to receive the permission to be produced at the Imperial Theatres) Stay in Your Own Sled. Her triumph as Dunya Rusakova paved for her the way for a series of successful appearances in Ostrovsky's plays at Maly. She reached the peak of her career as Katerina in The Storm (1859), setting a template in what is now regarded as a Russian theatre classic. By this time Kositskaya and Ostrovsky were intimate friends, and it was later suggested that many details of her own youth, spent on the Volga banks, have been used by the playwright in the tragedy's plotline.

In 1860s Kositskaya started to appear in comedies, although critics praised her as Desdemona in Othello as well. Her last part was that of Lizaveta in Aleksei Pisemsky's A Bitter Fate (1863). After two years of close relationship, Ostrovsky proposed to Kositskaya and was refused. She fell instead for a merchant's son Sokolov, one of her young followers, who soon squandered all of her money and left her. Shock and humiliation apparently hastened Kositskaya's physical demise. She died on 17 September 1868, in Moscow and was buried at the Vagankovo Cemetery. Ten years later her memoirs called Notes (Zapiski) were published by Russkaya Starina (1878, book XXI), to much critical acclaim.
