= Nikolay Dobrolyubov =

Russian philosopher and revolutionary (1836–1861)

- Николай Александрович Добролюбов
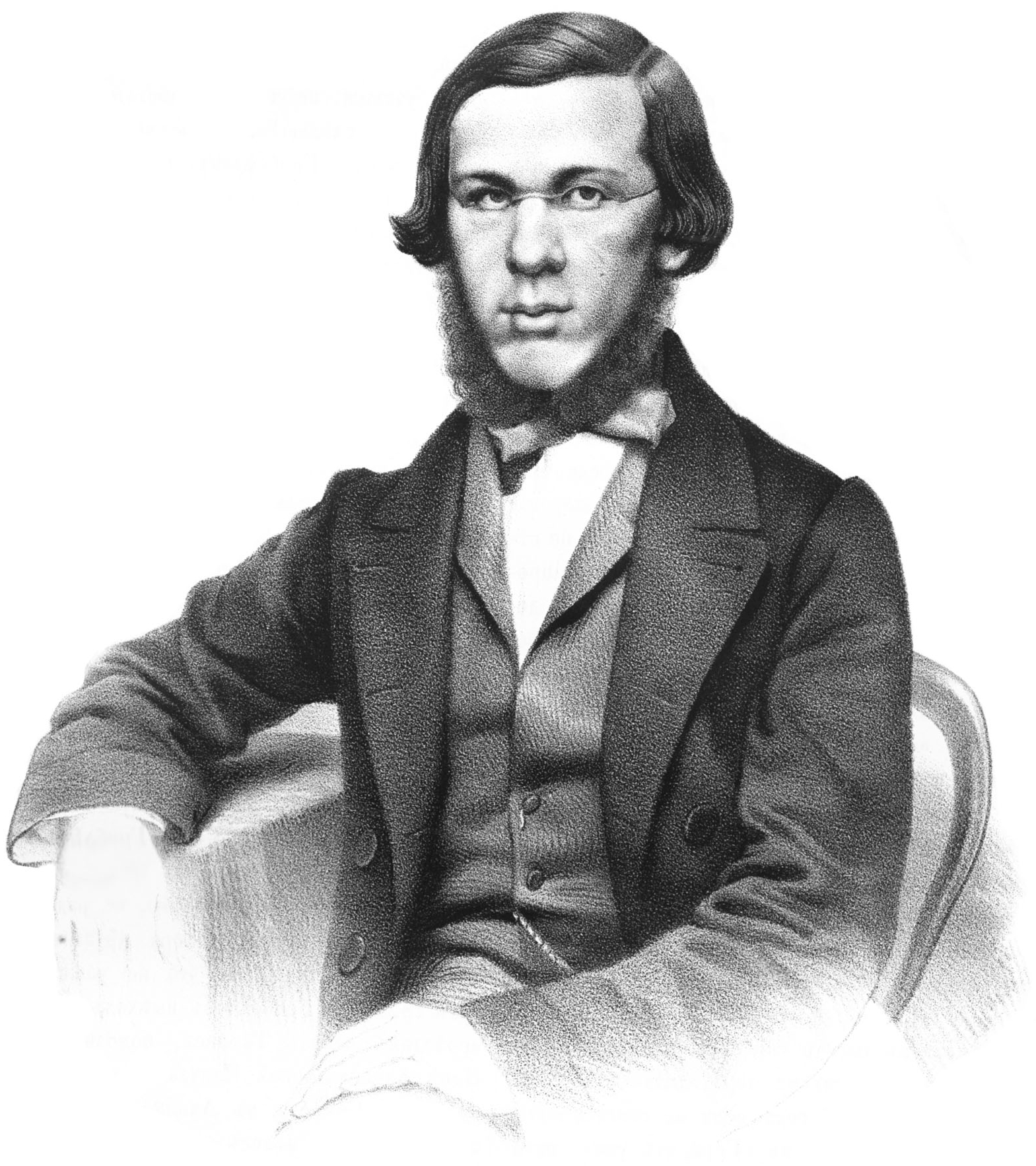
- Born: 5 February 1836; Nizhny Novgorod, Nizhny Novgorod Governorate, Russian Empire
- Died: 29 November 1861 (aged 25); Saint Petersburg, Russian Empire
- Writing career
- Years active: 1854–1861
- Genres: Literary criticism, journalism, poetry

Signature
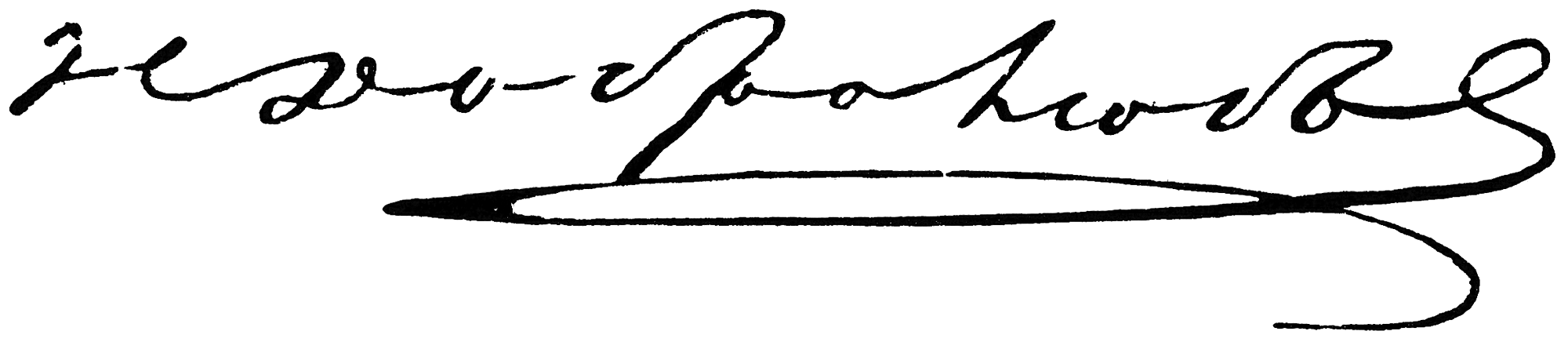

Nikolay Alexandrovich Dobrolyubov (Russian: Николай Александрович Добролюбов, IPA: [nʲɪkɐˈlaj ɐlʲɪˈksandrəvʲɪtɕ dəbrɐˈlʲubəf]; 5 February [O.S. 24 January] 1836 – 29 November [O.S. 17 November] 1861) was a Russian poet, literary critic, journalist, and prominent figure of the Russian revolutionary movement. He was a literary hero to both Karl Marx and Lenin.

== Biography ==
Dobrolyubov was born in Nizhny Novgorod, where his father was a poor priest.

He was educated at a clerical primary school, then at a seminary from 1848 to 1853. His teachers in the seminary considered him a prodigy, and at home he spent most of his time in his father's library, reading books on science and art. By the age of thirteen he was writing poetry and translating verses from Roman poets such as Horace. In 1853 he went to Saint Petersburg and entered the Saint Petersburg Main Pedagogical Institute. Following the deaths of each of his parents (March and August 1854), he assumed responsibility for his brothers and sisters. He worked as a tutor and translator in order to support his family and to continue his studies. His heavy workload and the stress of his position had a negative effect on his health.

During his tertiary education (1853 to 1857) Dobrolyubov organized an underground democratic circle, issued a manuscript newspaper, and led the students' struggle against the reactionary educational administration. His poems On the 50th Birthday of N. I. Grech (1854), and Ode on the Death of Nicholas I (1855), copies of which were distributed outside the institute, showed his hostile attitude toward the autocracy.

In 1856 Dobrolybov met the influential critic Nikolay Chernyshevsky and the publisher Nikolay Nekrasov. He soon began publishing his works in Nekrasov's popular journal Sovremennik. In June 1857, after his graduation from the Pedagogical Institute, he joined the staff of Sovremennik and soon became head of its Book Review section. Over the next four years, he produced several volumes of important critical essays. One of his best-known works was his essay What is Oblomovism?, based on his analysis of the 1859 novel Oblomov by Ivan Goncharov.

In May 1860, at the insistence of friends, he went abroad in an effort to treat incipient tuberculosis, which had been exacerbated by overwork. He lived in Germany, Switzerland, France, and for more than six months in Italy, where the national liberation movement, led by Giuseppe Garibaldi, was taking place. The situation in Italy provided him with material for a series of articles.

He returned to Russia in July 1861. He died in November 1861, at the age of twenty-five, from acute tuberculosis. He was buried next to Vissarion Belinsky at Volkovo Cemetery in Saint Petersburg.

== Legacy ==
Dobrolyubov's writings were admired by Karl Marx. In a letter dated 9 November 1871 to Nikolai Danielson, who was then translating Das Kapital, Marx wrote that he was partially acquainted with Dobrolyubov's writings and compared him "as a writer to Lessing and Diderot".

== English translations ==
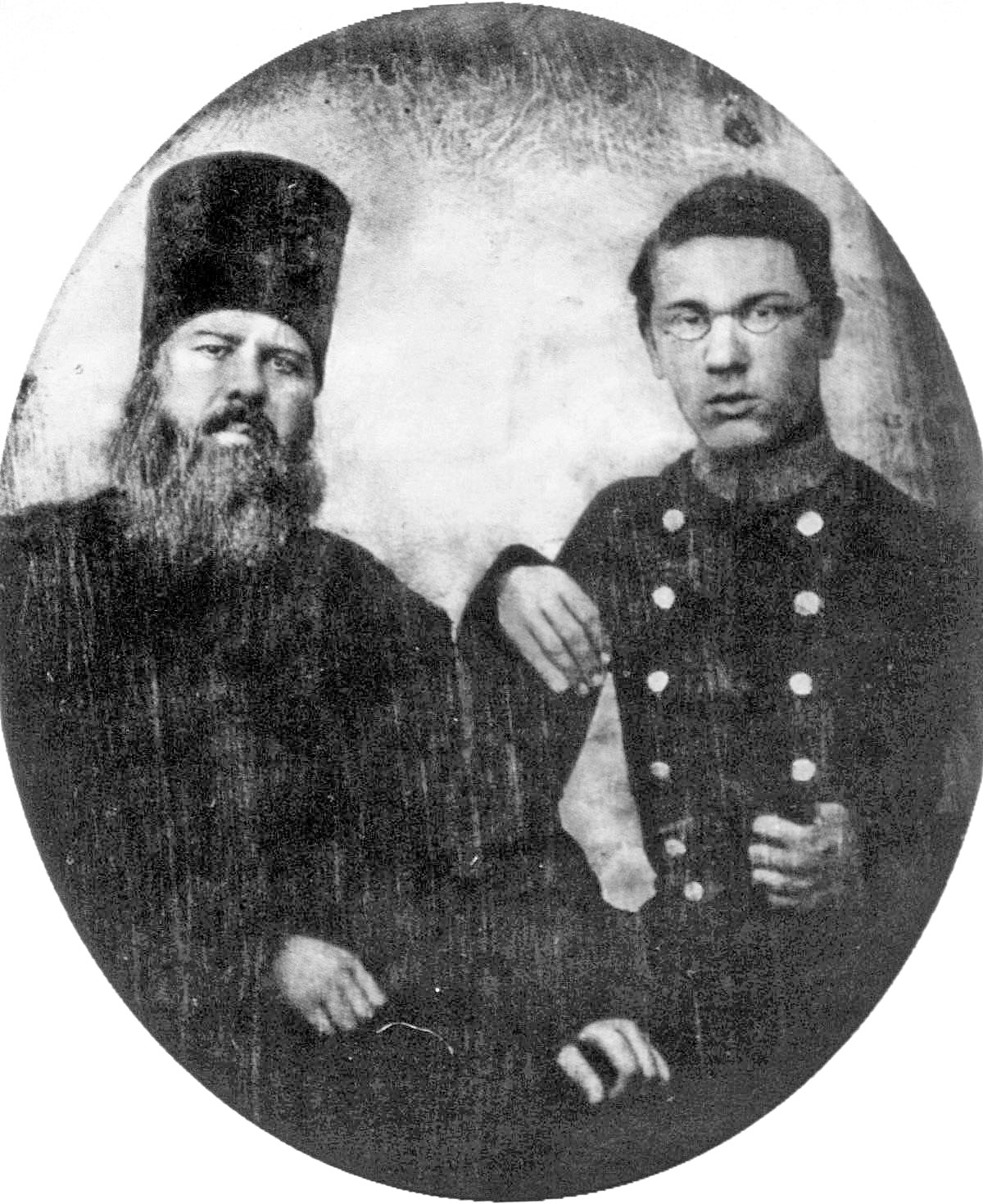
Nikolay with his father, 1854

- What is Oblomovism?, from Anthology of Russian Literature, Part 2, Page 272, Leo Weiner, G.P. Putnam's Sons, NY, 1903. from Archive.org
- Selected Philosophical Essays, Foreign Languages Publishing House, Moscow, 1956.
- Belinsky, Chernyshevsky & Dobrolyubov: Selected Criticism, Indiana University Press, Bloomington, 1976.
