= Terty Filippov =

Russian journalist, folklorist, singer

Terty Ivanovich Filippov
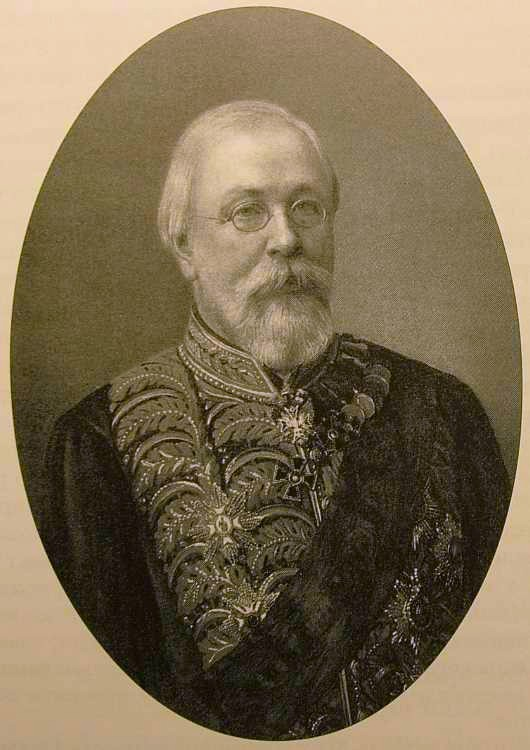
- Born: Тертий Иванович Филиппов; 5 January 1825; Rzhev, Tver Governorate, Russian Empire
- Died: 12 December 1899 (aged 74); Saint Petersburg, Russia
- Occupations: folklorist, journalist, church and state official

Terty Ivanovich Filippov (Те́ртий Ива́нович Фили́ппов; 5 January 1825 in Rzhev, Tver Governorate, Russian Empire – 12 December 1899 in Saint Petersburg, Russian Empire) was a Russian folklorist, singer, pedagogue, the Honorary member of the Saint Petersburg Academy of Sciences. As a journalist, Filippov contributed mostly to Pogodin's Moskvityanin, Katkov's Russky Vestnik and Russkaya Beseda, the magazine he was a co-founder of. In 1857–1864 Filippov served as a Russian Orthodox Church official. In 1889–1899 he was the Chairman of the Russian State Control committee. He was awarded Serbian Order of Saint Sava and Order of the Cross of Takovo.

== Works ==
- — (15 October 1882). Rimsky-Korsakov, Nikolai (ed.). 40 Народныхъ Пѣсенъ [40 Folk Songs] (in Russian). P. Jurgenson.
