= Prov Sadovsky =

Russian actor (1818–1872)

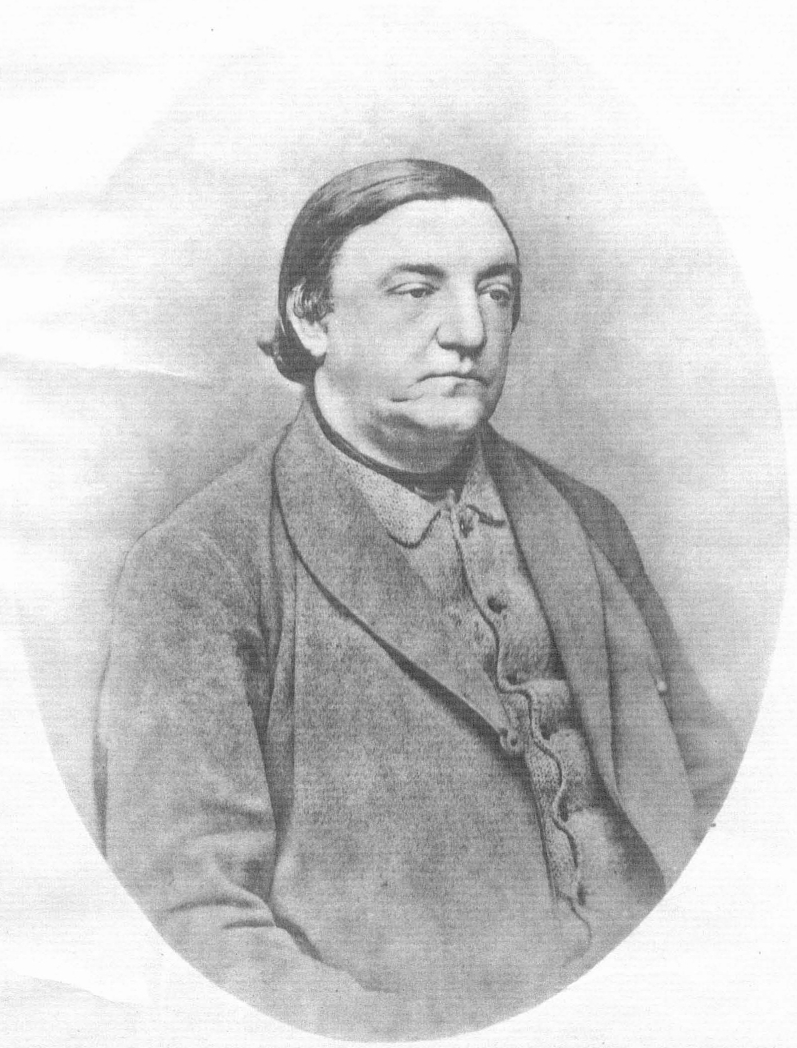
Prov Sadovsky

Prov Sadovsky was the stage name of Prov Mikhailovich Yermilov (1818–1872), a Russian actor who founded the famous Sadovsky theatrical family.

The family were regarded as the foremost interpreters of the plays of Aleksandr Ostrovsky in the Malyi Theatre until the mid-20th century. It has been said that Sadovsky and his relatives made of Ostrovsky's plays a national institution.

Some of his most famous family members who were also actors of the Maly Theater include:

- Son Mikhail Provich Sadovsky (1847–1910) and his wife Olga Osipovna Sadovskaya (1849–1919)
- Granddaughter Yelizaveta Sadovskaya (1872–1934)
- Grandson Prov Sadovsky Jr. (1874–1947)
- Grandson Mikhail Mikhailovich (senior) (1878–1962)

Prov Sadovsky is mentioned in Anton Chekhov's famous 1896 play, The Seagull, in a comparison to a famous Russian comedian of the same era, Pavel Chadin. Both men were known at the time to play the same character, Rasplyuev, from the comedy, The Marriage of Krechinsky by A. Sukhovo-Kobylin.
