= Askold's Grave =

Park in Kyiv, Ukraine

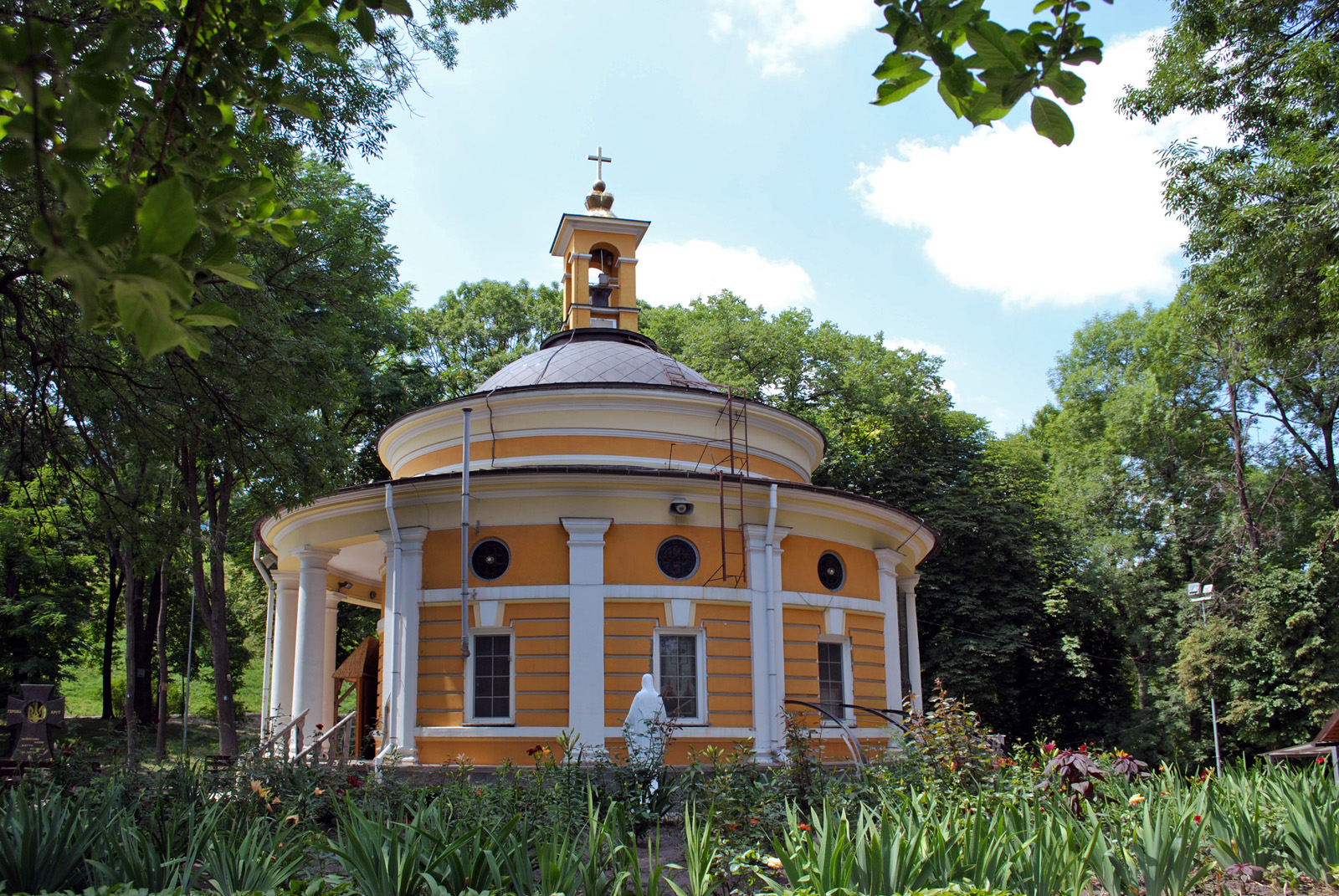
- St. Nicholas Church
- Interactive map of Askold's Grave
- Location: Kyiv, Ukraine
- Coordinates: 50°26′38″N 30°33′5″E

Immovable Monument of National Significance of Ukraine
- Official name: Аскольдова могила (Askold's Grave)
- Type: History
- Reference no.: 260036-Н

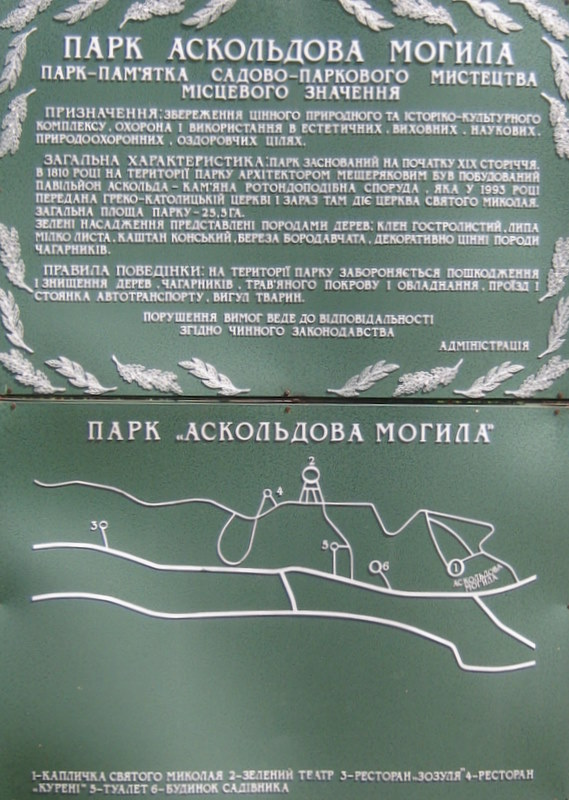
Park "Askold's Grave" information board

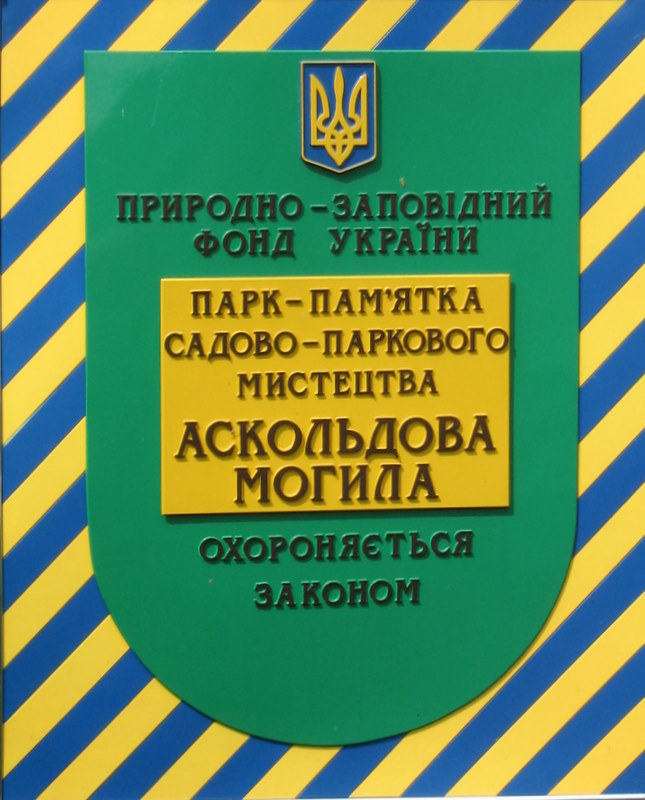
Natural Reserve Fund of Ukraine official placard

Askold's Grave (Ukrainian: Аскольдова Могила, romanized: Askoldova Mohyla) is a historical park on the steep right bank of the Dnipro River in Kyiv between Mariinskyi Park and the Kyiv Pechersk Lavra complex. The park was created by the Soviets in the mid-1930s in place of an old graveyard around the Church of St. Nicholas, which, as the story goes, marks the place where Prince Askold of Kyiv was buried in the 9th century. Starting from the 20th century, Askold's Grave has once again been used as a burial site on several occasions, and currently functions as an unofficial memorial to soldiers fallen in the Russo-Ukrainian War.

== History ==
In the Middle Ages, Askold's Grave was known as the Hungarian tract (Ukrainian: Угорське урочище, romanized: Uhorske urochyshche). According to the Primary Chronicle, it was the place where the Magyars crossed the Dnipro on the way from the Russian steppes to Pannonia. Archeological excavations have revealed a 9th-century dirham hoard and some remains of Izyaslav II's wooden palace. There's a modern stele commemorating the Magyar migration. In the 15th and 16th centuries, Askold's Grave was settled by the Orthodox monks of St. Nicholas's Monastery. Hetman Mazepa had the monastery moved to a nearby hill, where a new Baroque penticupolar cathedral was then erected. The existing church of St. Nicholas is a modest Neoclassical rotunda designed by Andrey Melensky in 1810.

Following the 1918 Battle of Kruty, several student volunteers fallen in the battle were buried at Askold's Grave, but were later reinterred at the Lukyanivka Cemetery; memorial cross in honour of the buried students was placed on the site in 1992. During the Stalin era, the cemetery was demolished, with gravestones being used to pave the alleys of the newly established park, and the church being replaced by a restaurant. During the Second World War, the area was once again used for burials, this time by German troops. In 2012-2013 remains of German soldiers buried at Askold's Grave were exhumed and reburied elsewhere in Kyiv Oblast.

In 1992 the church located on the site was transferred to the Ukrainian Greek Catholic Church by a decree of Kyiv City State Administration. In 1994 gathering of funds for the creation of a pantheon of notable Ukrainians on Askold's Grave was initiated by the National Writers' Union of Ukraine and a number of other civic organizations. A golden-domed chapel was built on the bank of the Dnipro in 2000. The Ukrainian Baroque revival chapel is dedicated to Saint Andrew Protokletos and belongs to the Moscow Patriarchate of the Ukrainian Orthodox Church.

Following the Revolution of Dignity, on 5 April 2014 the body of an unknown protester killed during the fire in the Trade Unions Building was buried on Askold's Grave, and an improvised chapel was installed nearby. The burial was claimed to have been permitted by acting head of the local administration Volodymyr Bondarenko, but no original documents allowing it have been found. In August of the same year, Mark Paslawsky, a member of Donbas Battalion fallen in the Battle of Ilovaisk, was interred on the site. During the following years, Askold's Grave became a memorial site for Ukrainian soldiers killed during the War in Donbas. In February 2022 a monument to Ukrainian troops fallen in the battles of Ilovaisk, Debaltseve and Donetsk Airport was unveiled there in presence of Commander-in-chief of the Armed Forces of Ukraine Valerii Zaluzhnyi.

Following the full-scale Russian invasion of Ukraine, several other people, including Heroes of Ukraine Dmytro Kotsiubailo, Andrii Pilshchykov and Pavlo Petrychenko, were buried at Askold's Grave. Despite this, the site has not been officially legalized as a burial location by the local authorities, making the graves already located there de-jure illegal.

== Points of interest ==
- Monument of Architecture "St. Nicholas Church"
- National Monument of Archaeology "Uhorske village"
- Chapels: St. Andrew, Exaltation of Cross
- Memorial burial (rebuilt, partially): Memorial to Holodomor victims, Memorial to Heroes of the Battle of Kruty
- Monument to Saint Andrew the First-Called

=== Lost landmarks ===
- Priest's House
- Bell tower
- St. Nicholas Hermitage
- Necropolis (original)

== In culture ==
The Opera Askold's grave composed by Russian composer Alexey Verstovsky and premiered in 1835, tells the story of how Askold and Dir happened to be buried in Askold's grave by Olga of Kyiv.

== Gallery ==
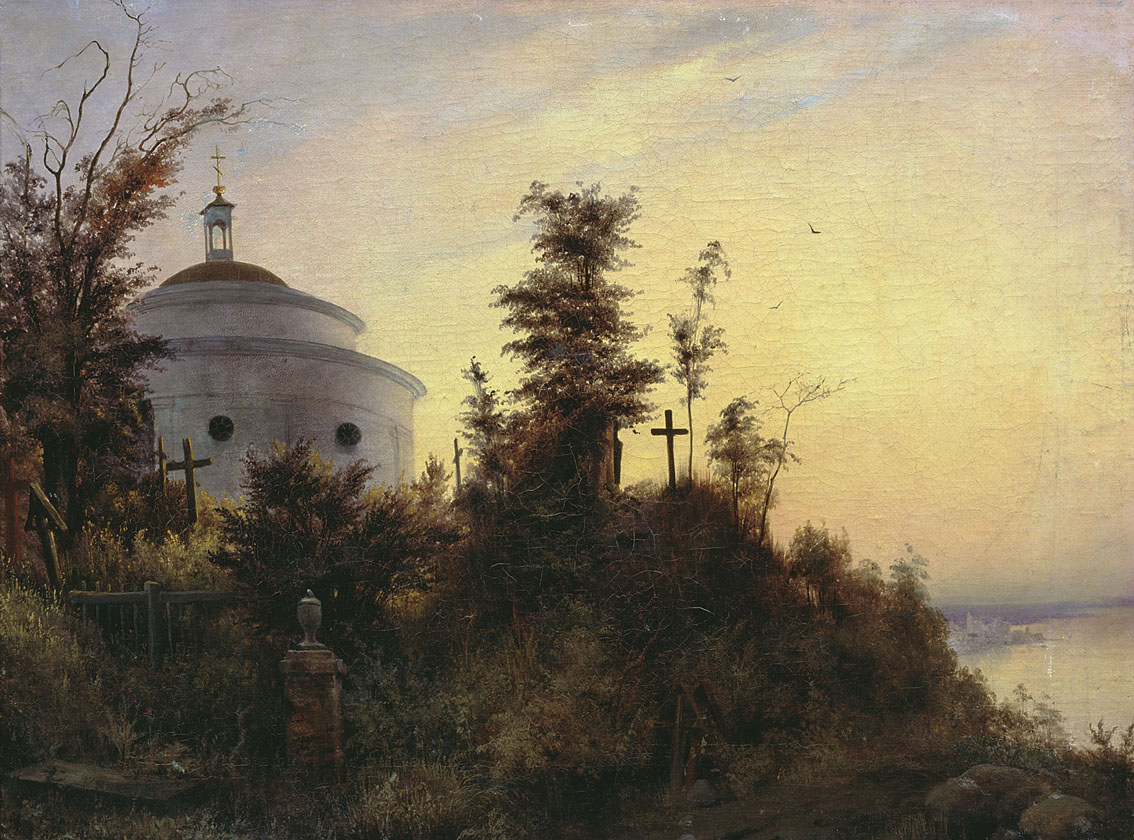
Askold's Grave, a painting of Vasily Shternberg (1837)

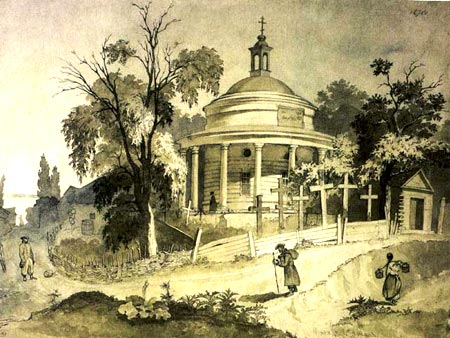
St.Nicholas Church sketch by Taras Shevchenko (1846)

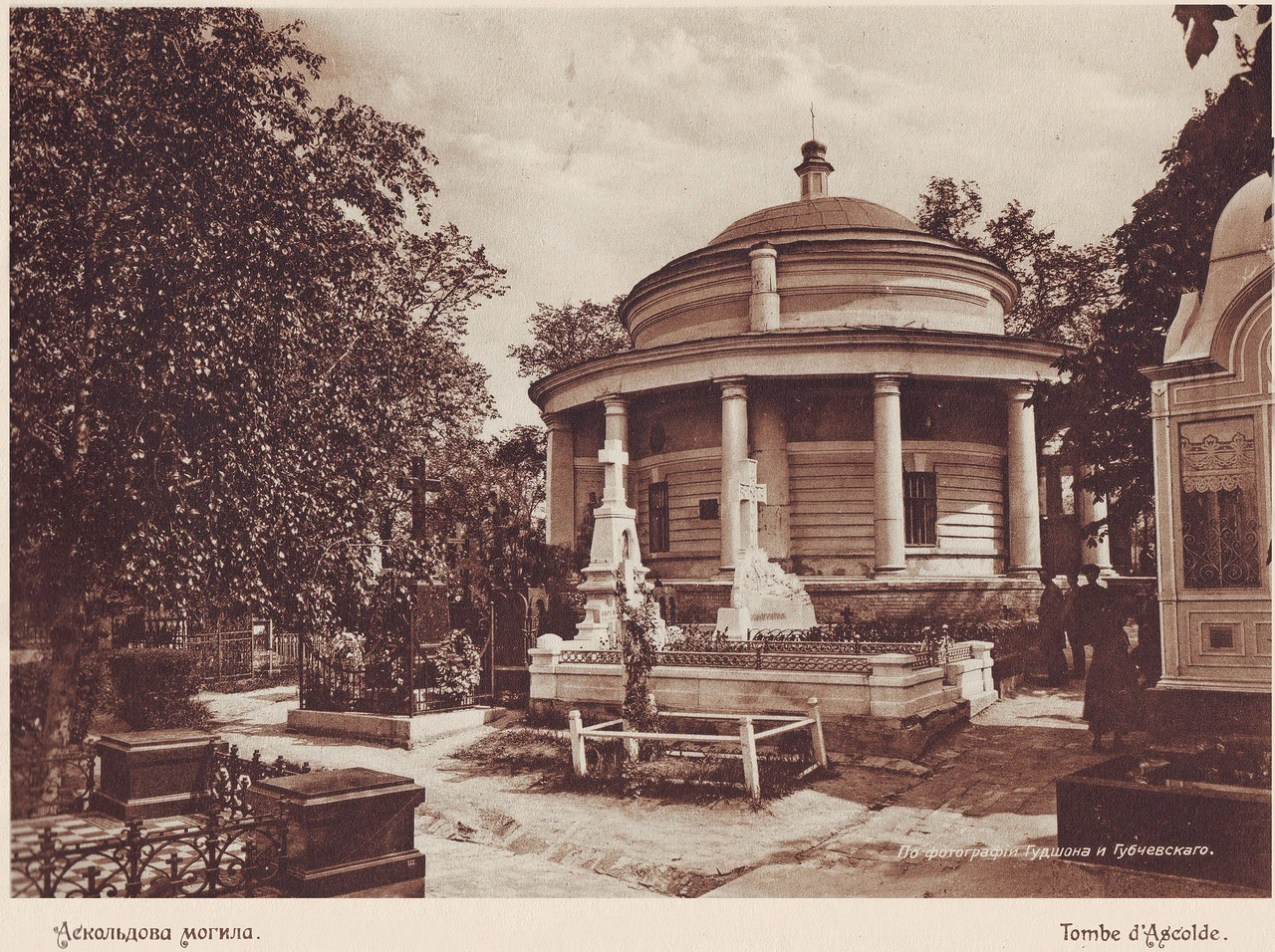
St.Nicholas Church (1911, photo)

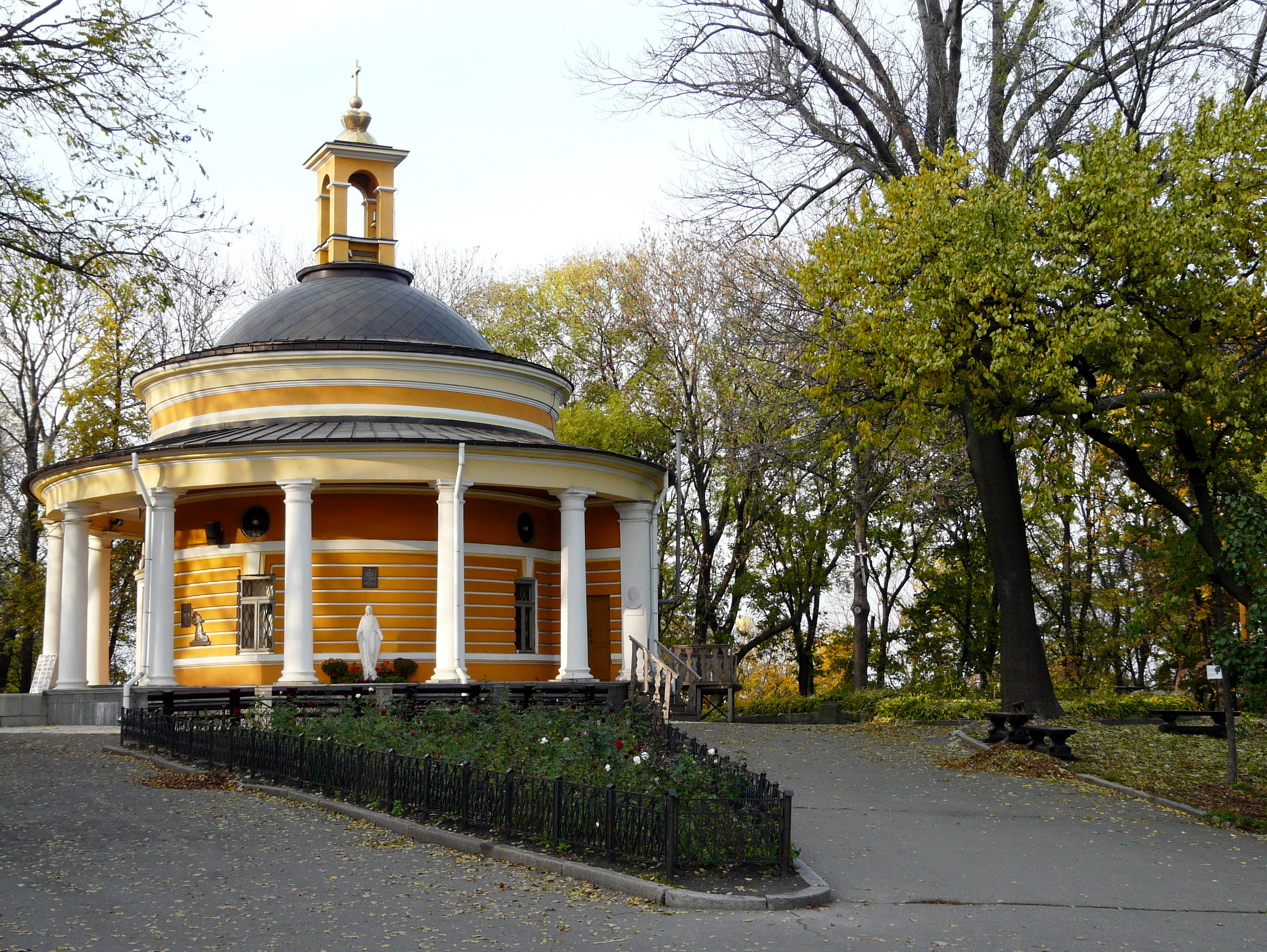
St.Nicholas Church (2009, photo)

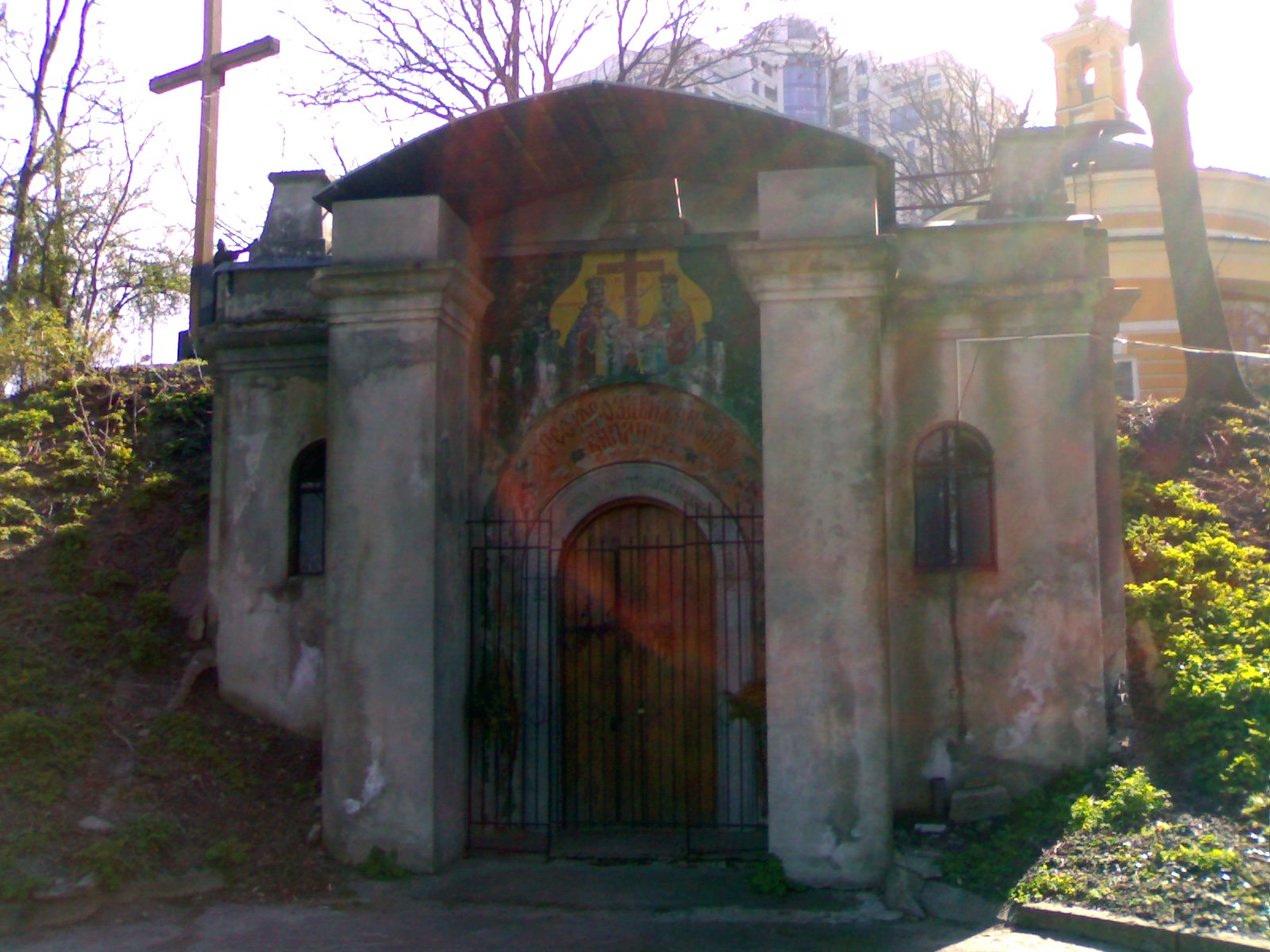
Chapel of Exaltation of Cross

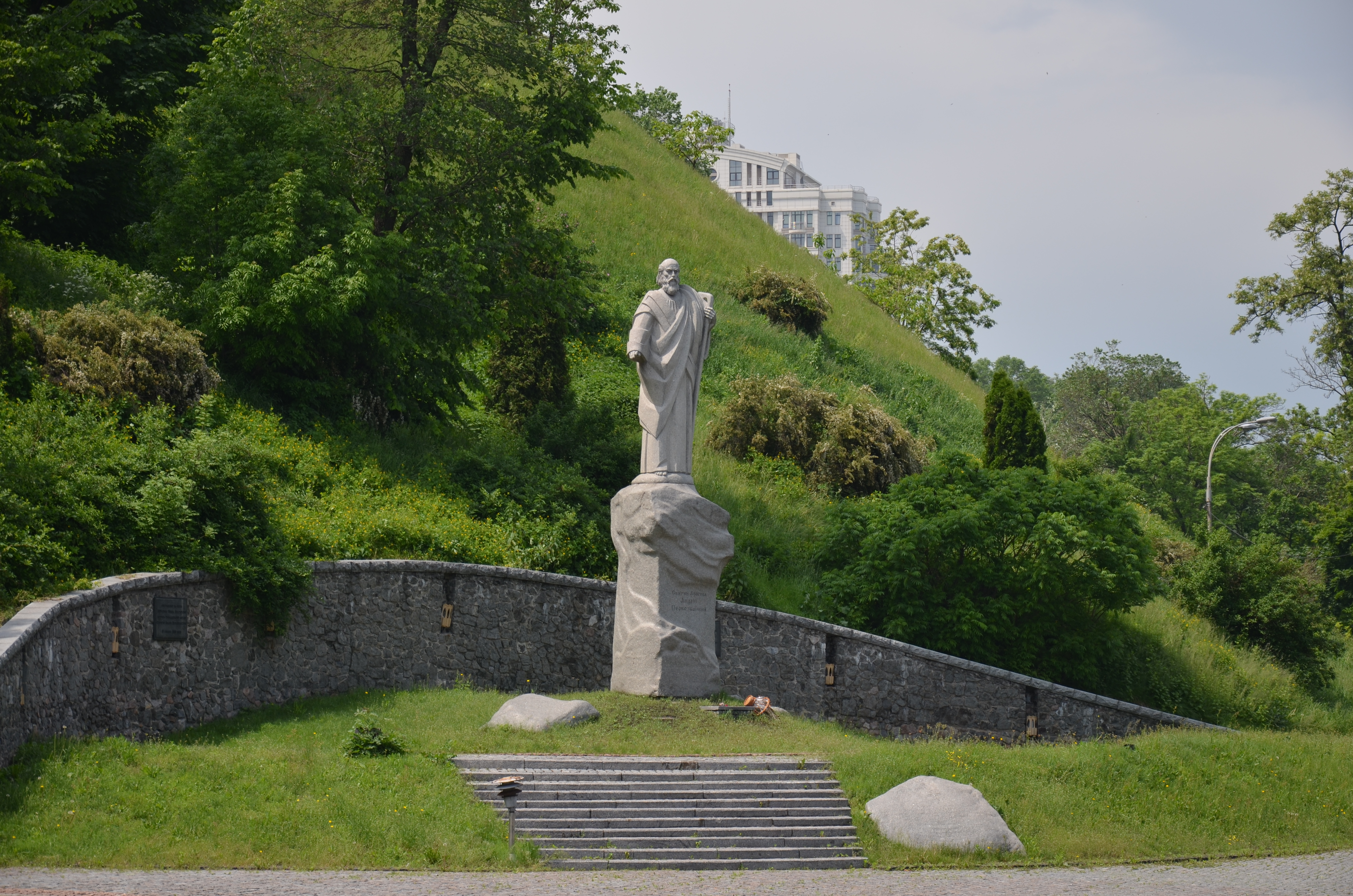
Monument to Saint Andrew the First-Called

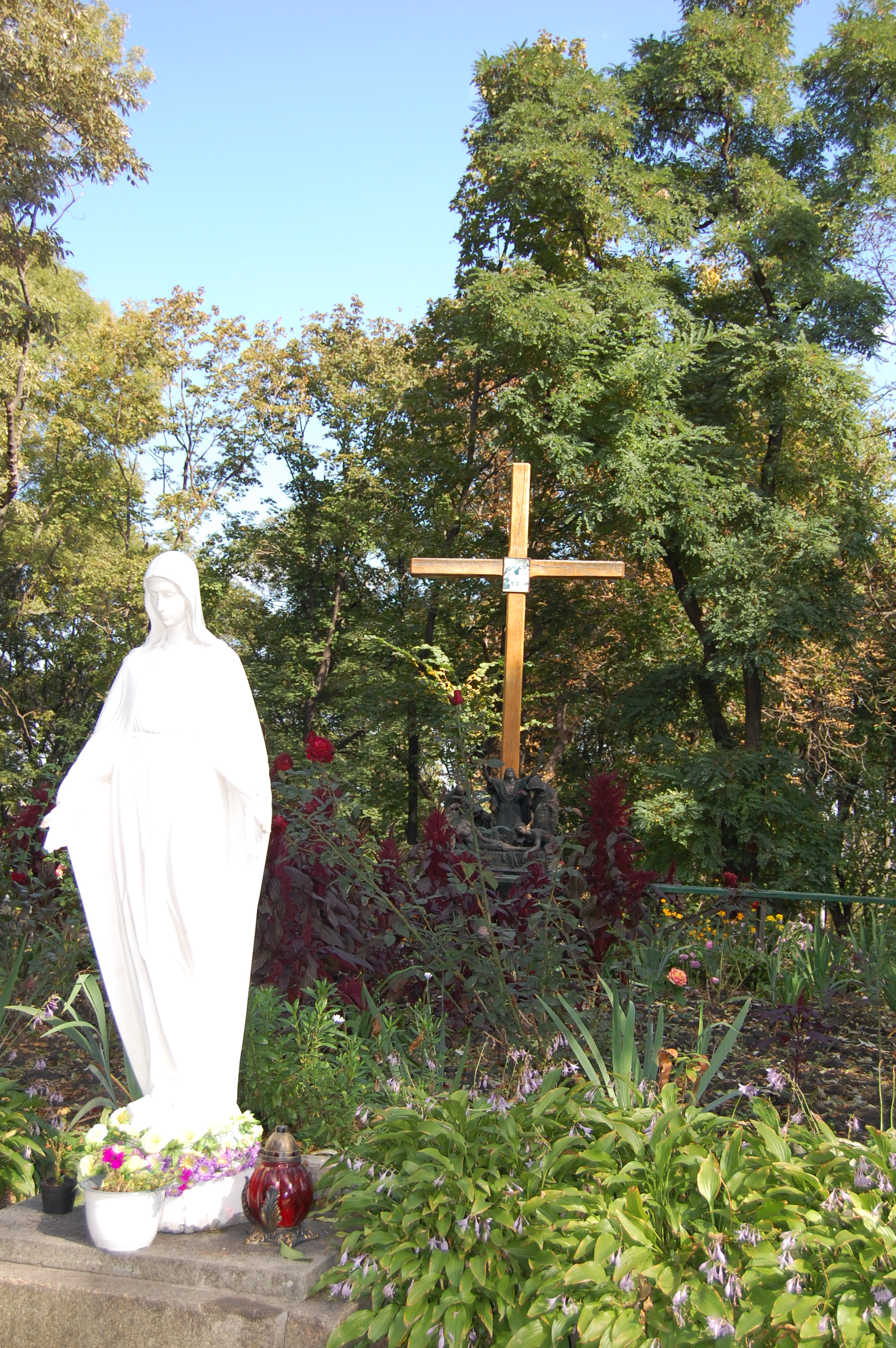
Sculpture of Blessed Virgin Mary

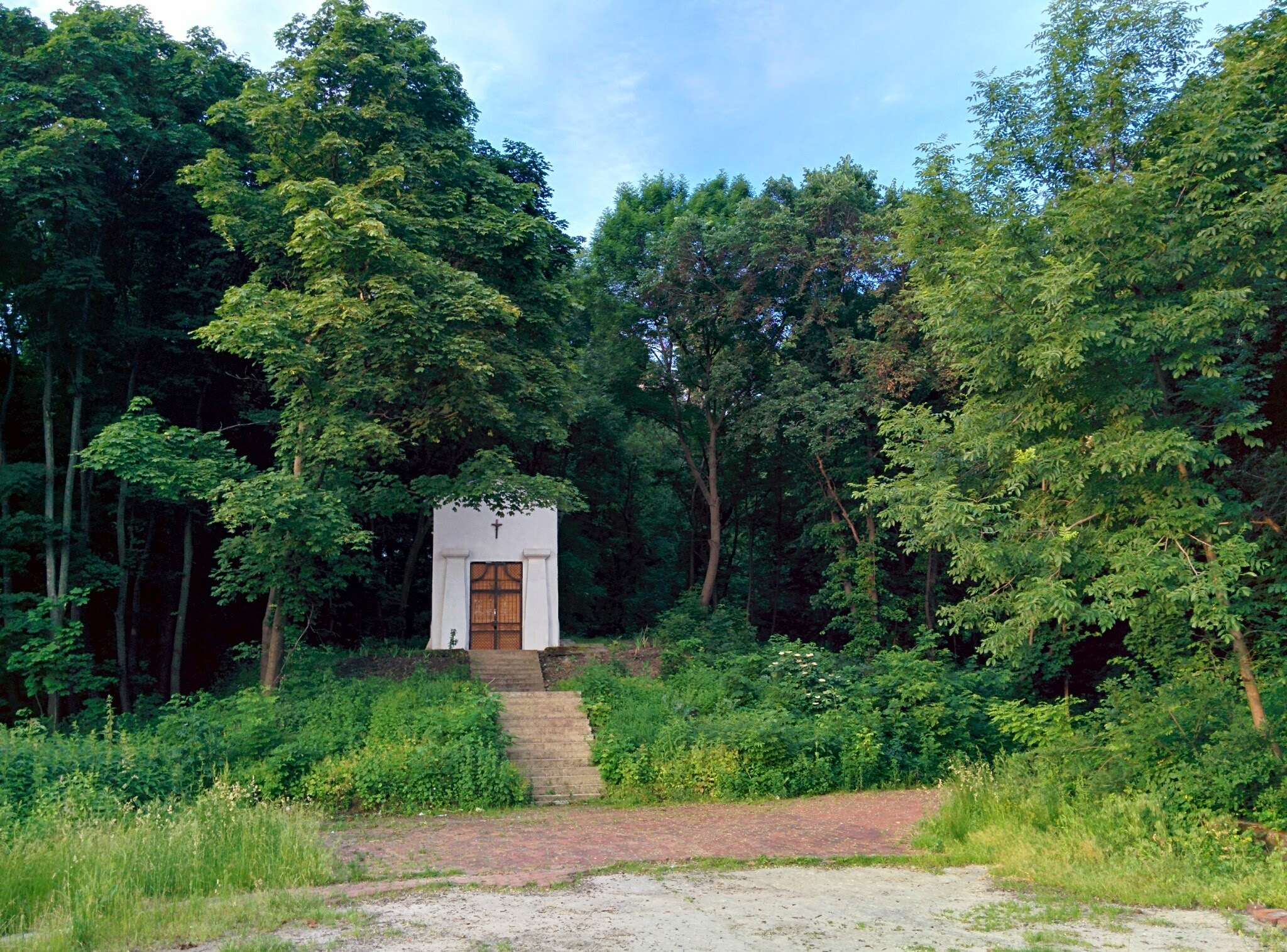
Askold's Tomb

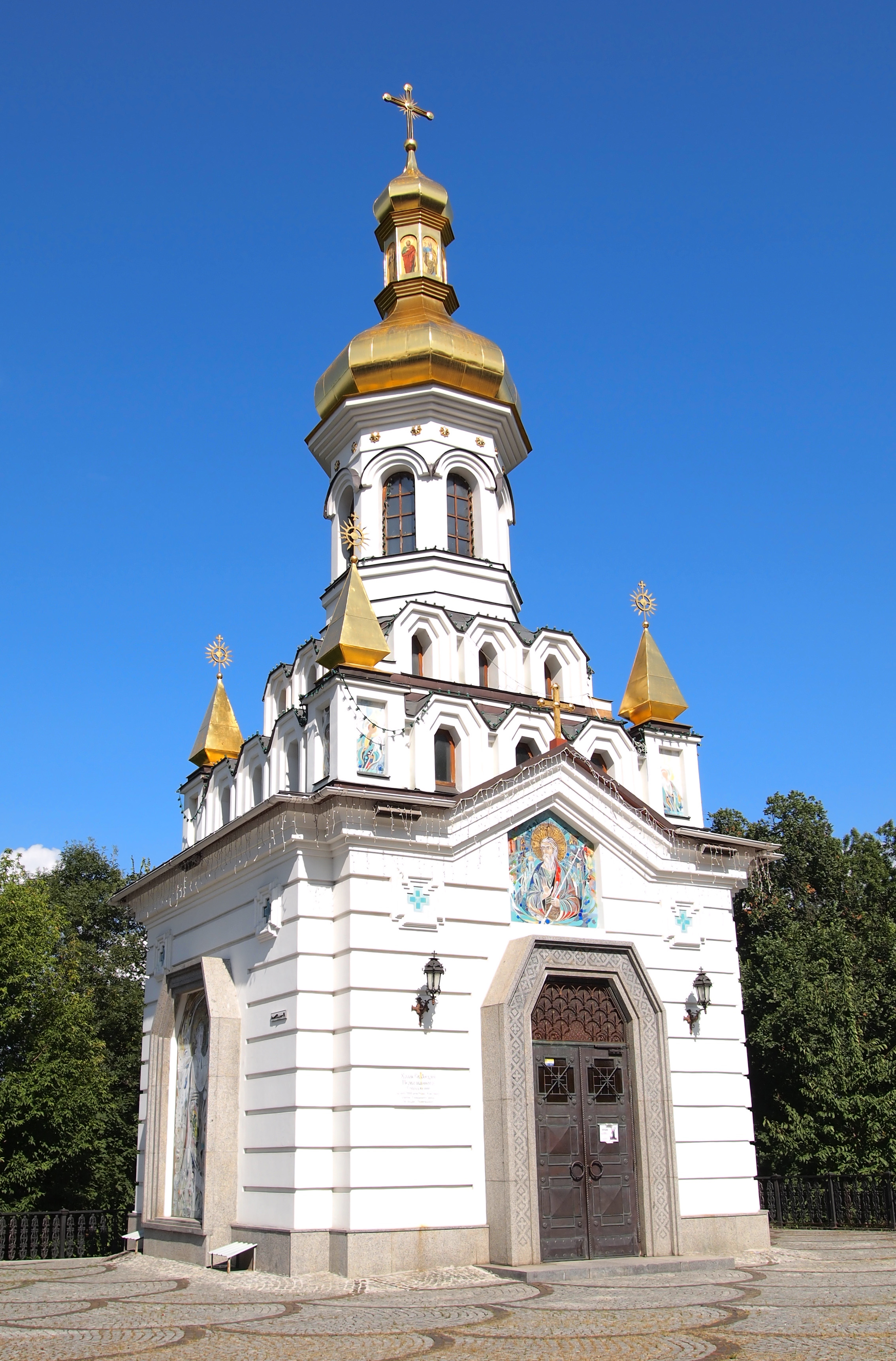
St.Andrew's Chapel

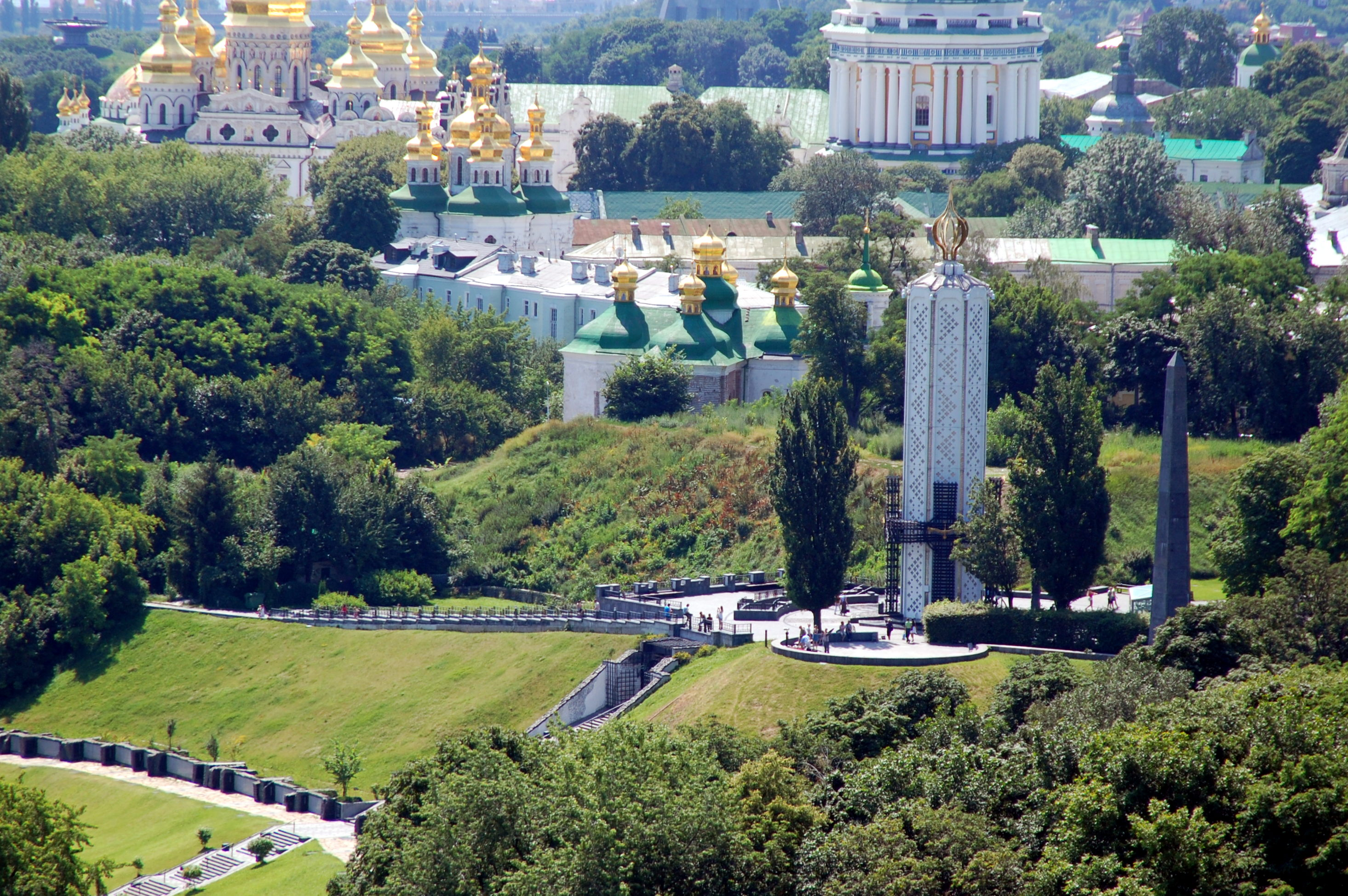
Memorial to Holodomor victims with Kyiv Pechersk Lavra in the background

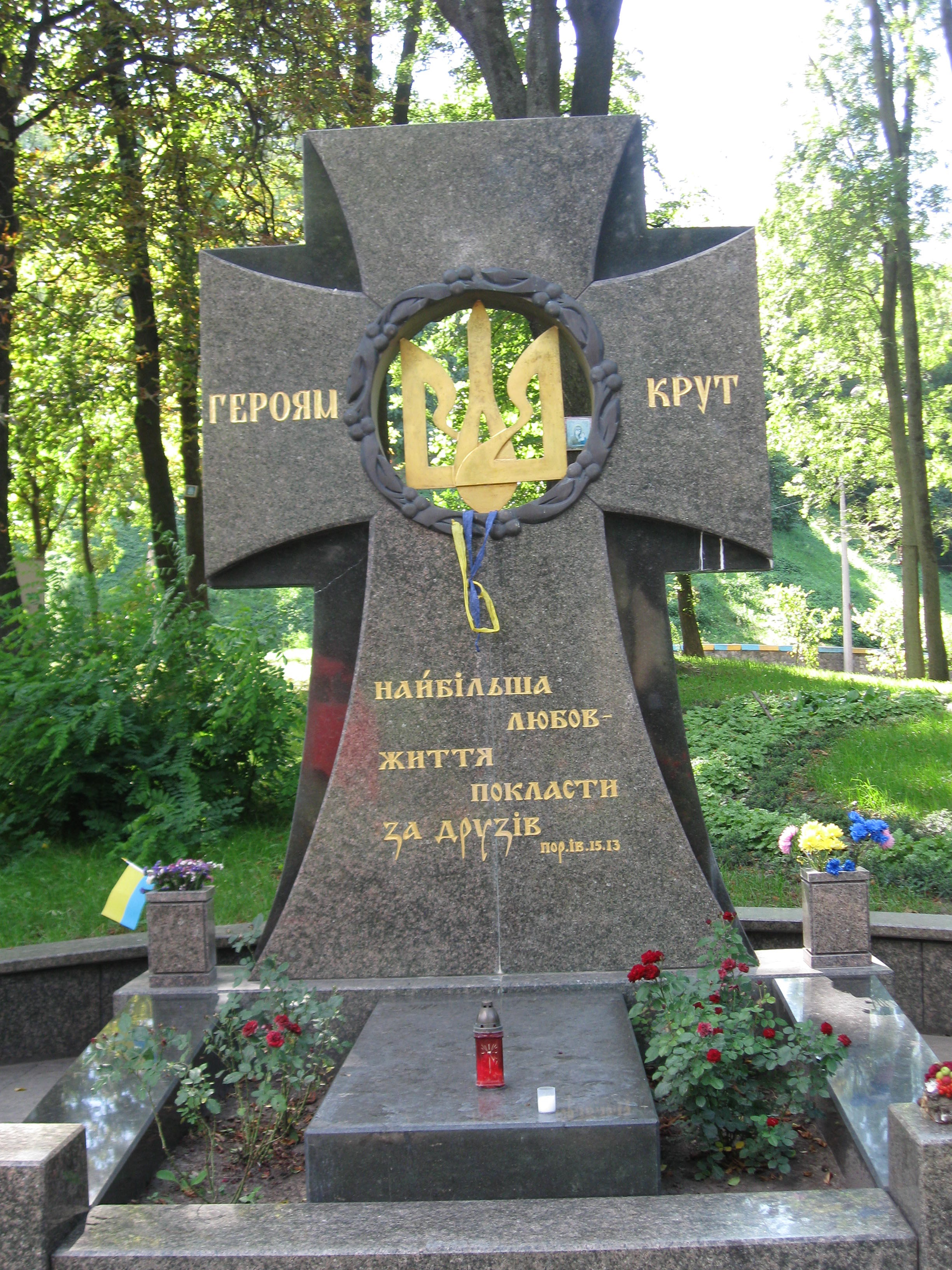
Heroes of the Battle of Kruty memorial

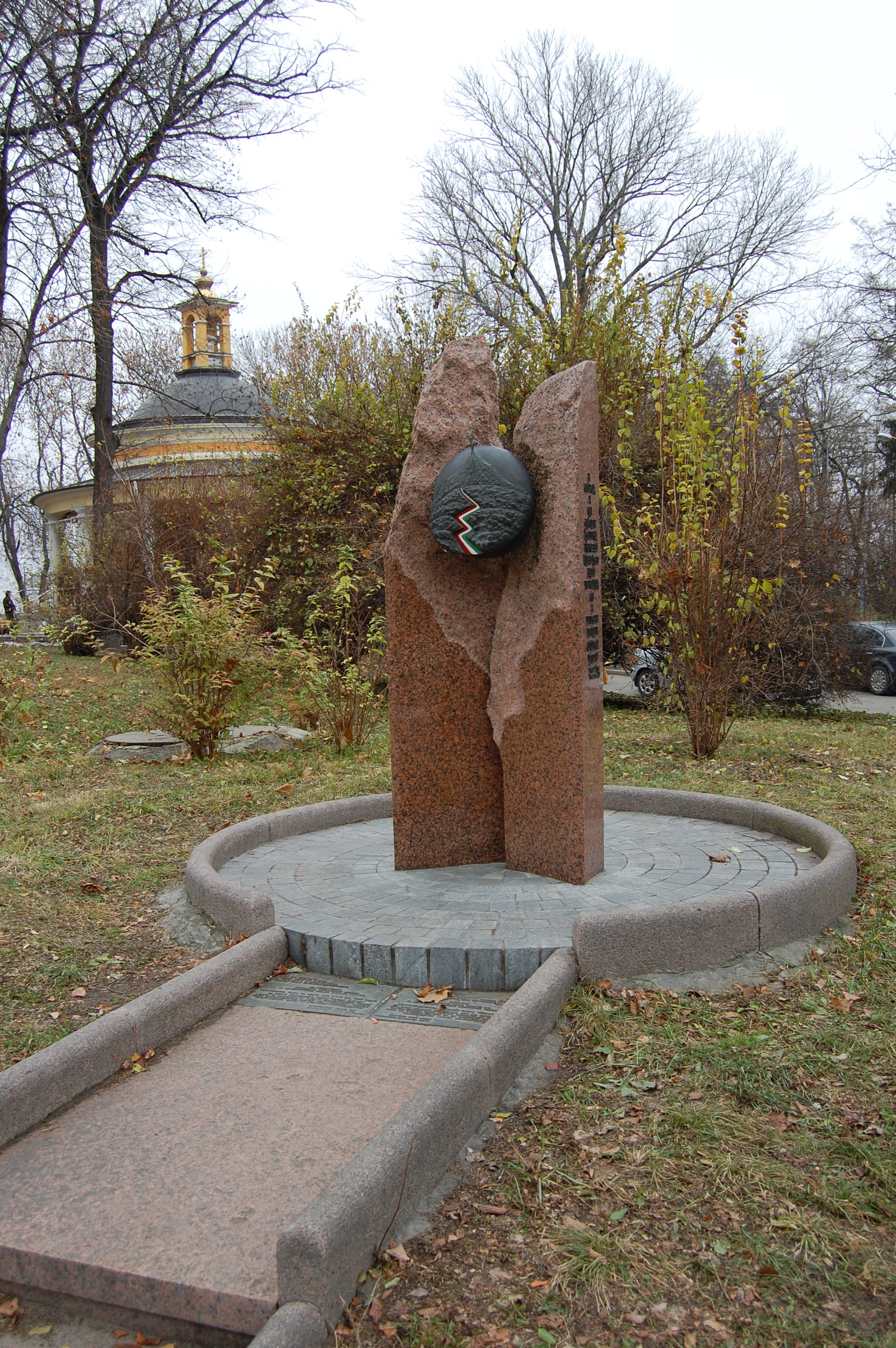
Modern stela commemorating the migration of Magyar tribes

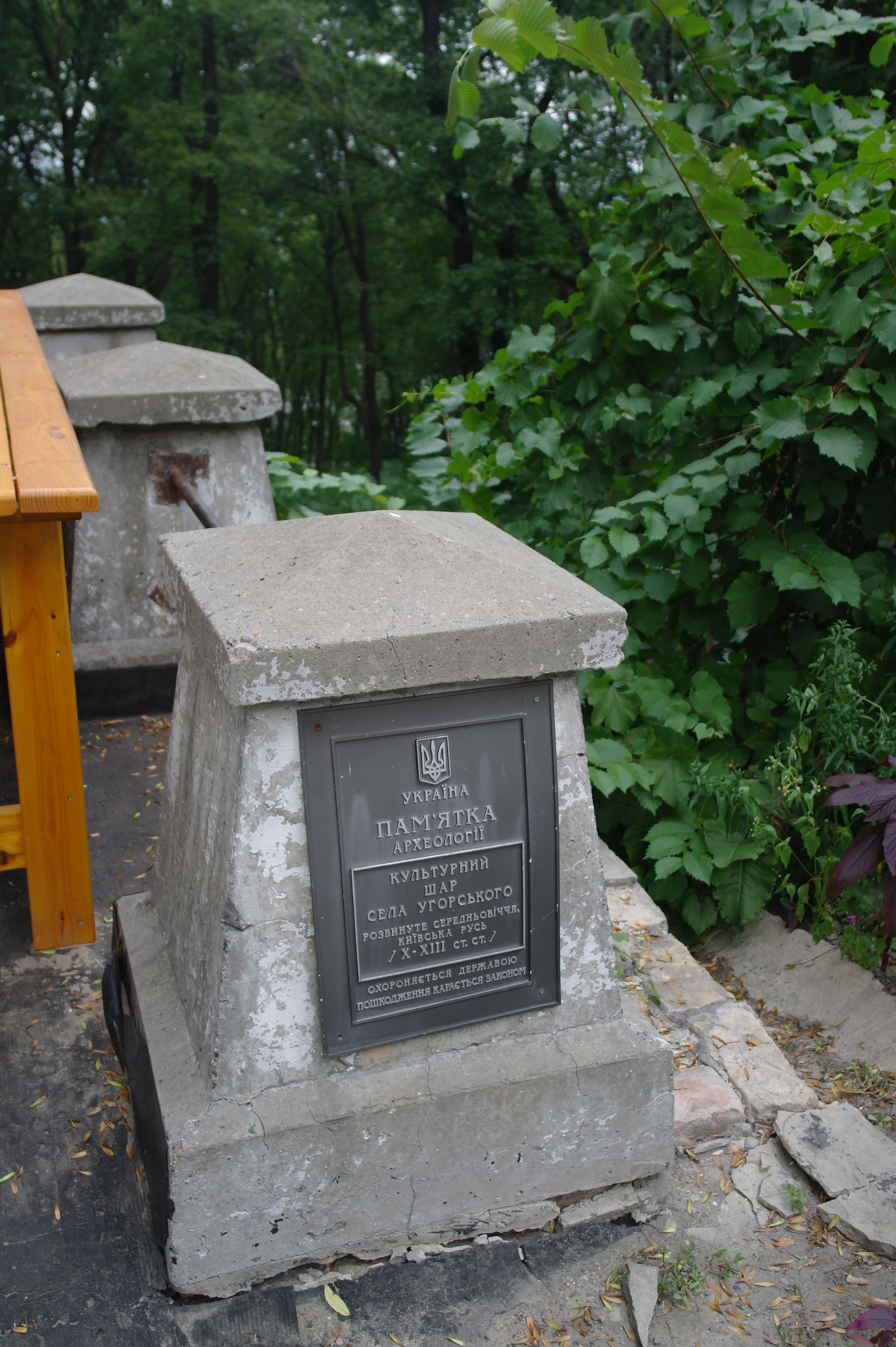
Official placard identifying the National Landmark of Archaeology Uhorske village

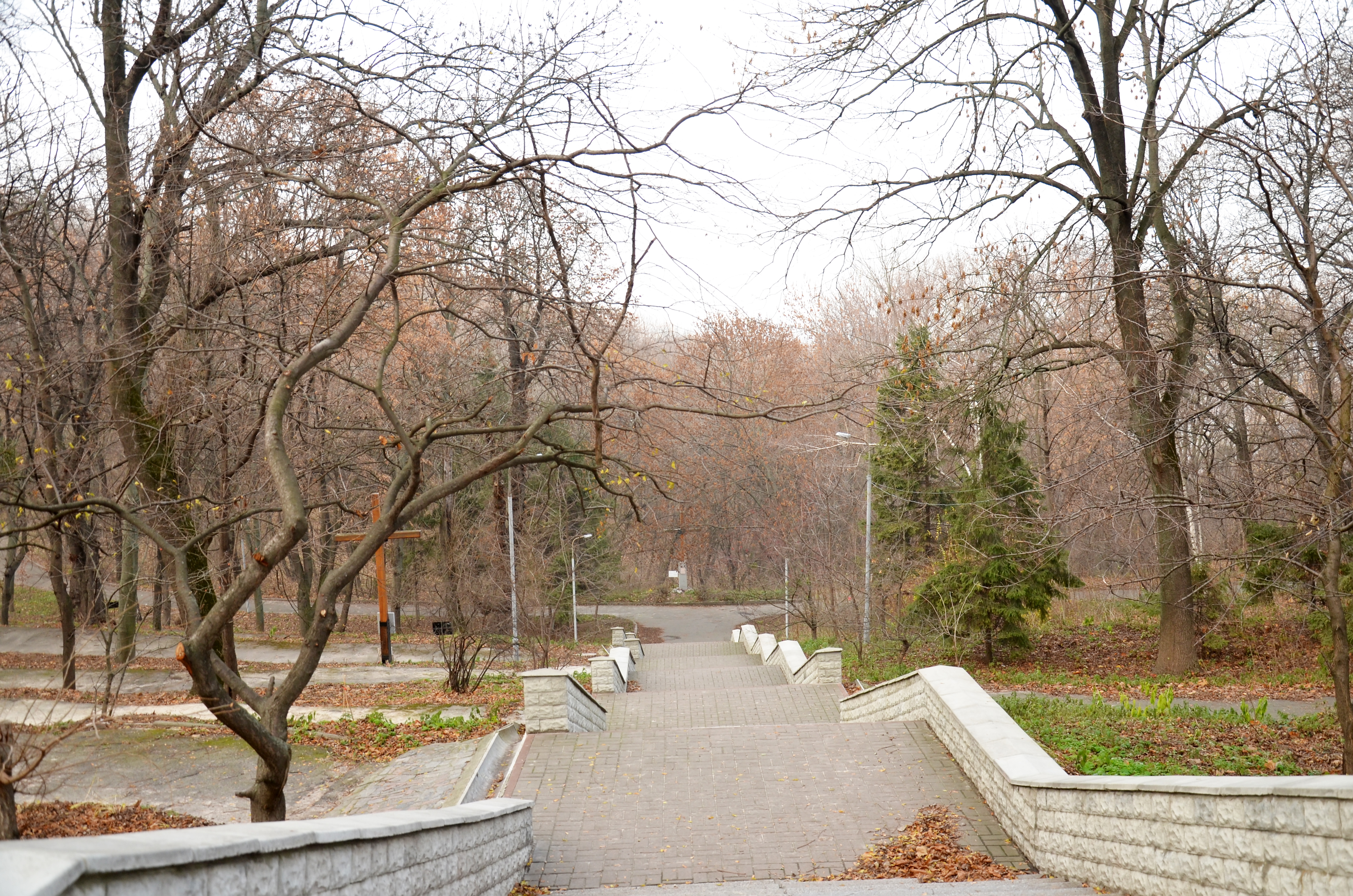
Flight of steps down to Dnipro from St. Nicholas Church

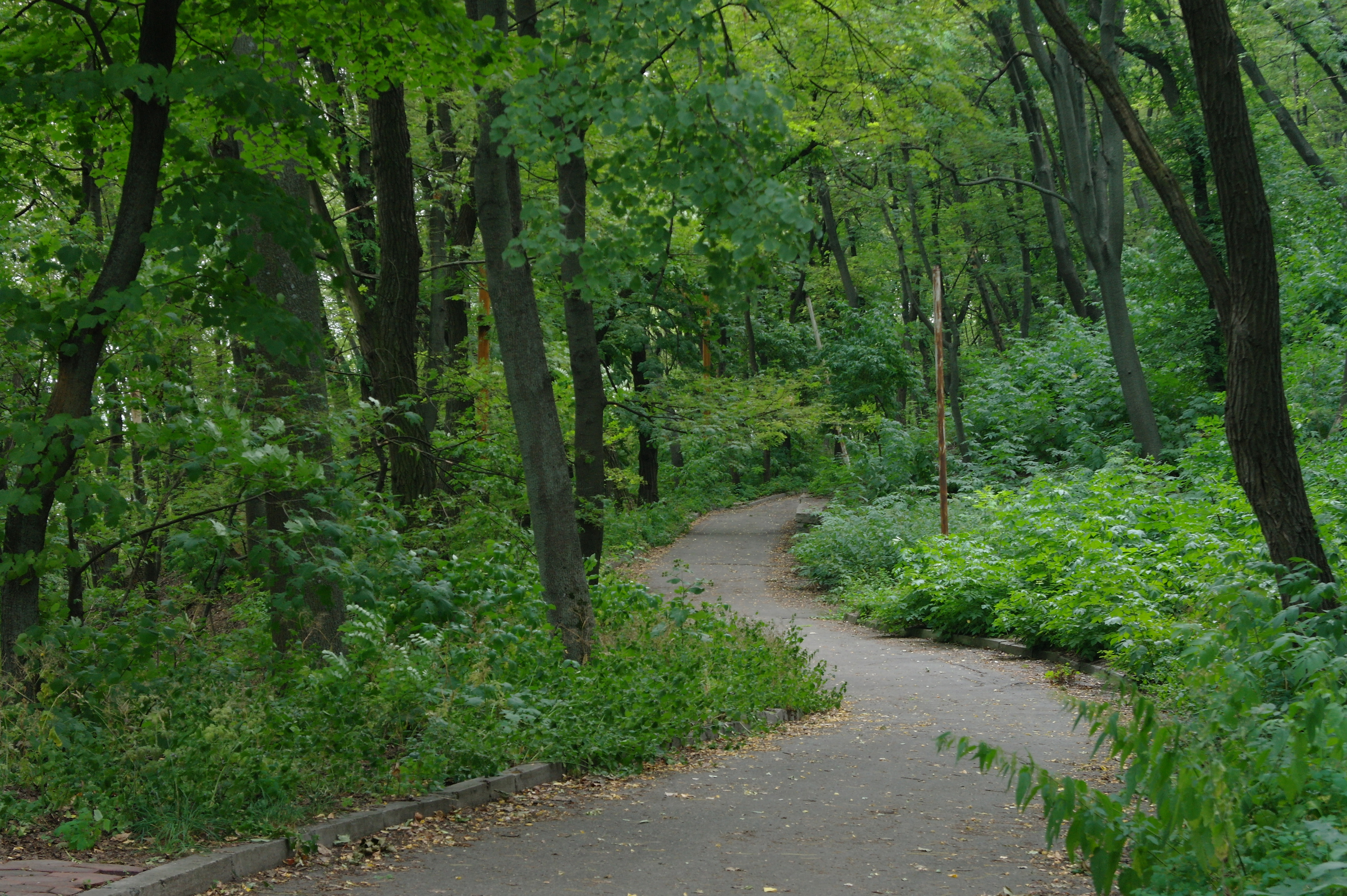
One of the Park's trails

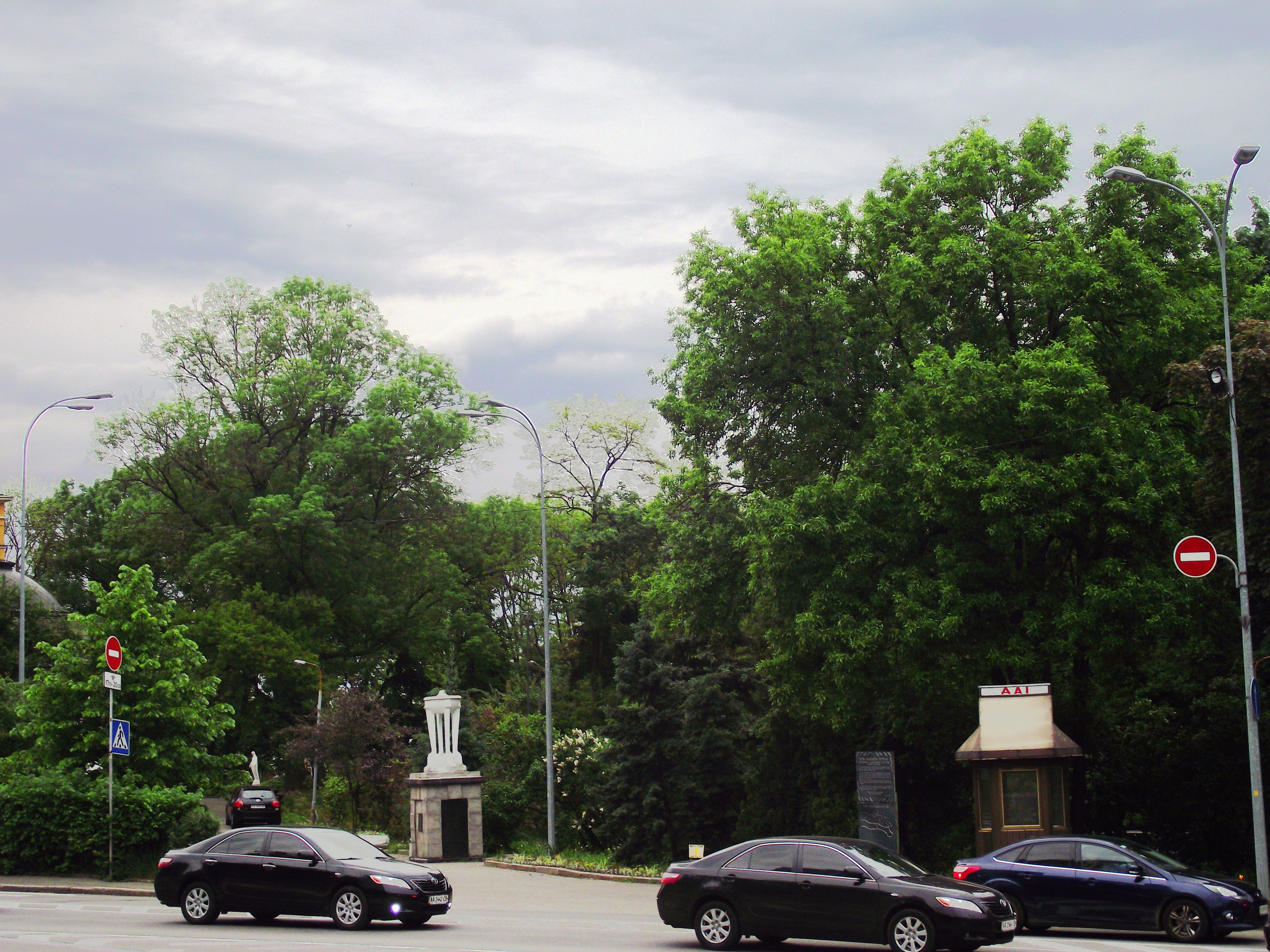
Traffic at the entrance (off Parkova Doroha, 2014)

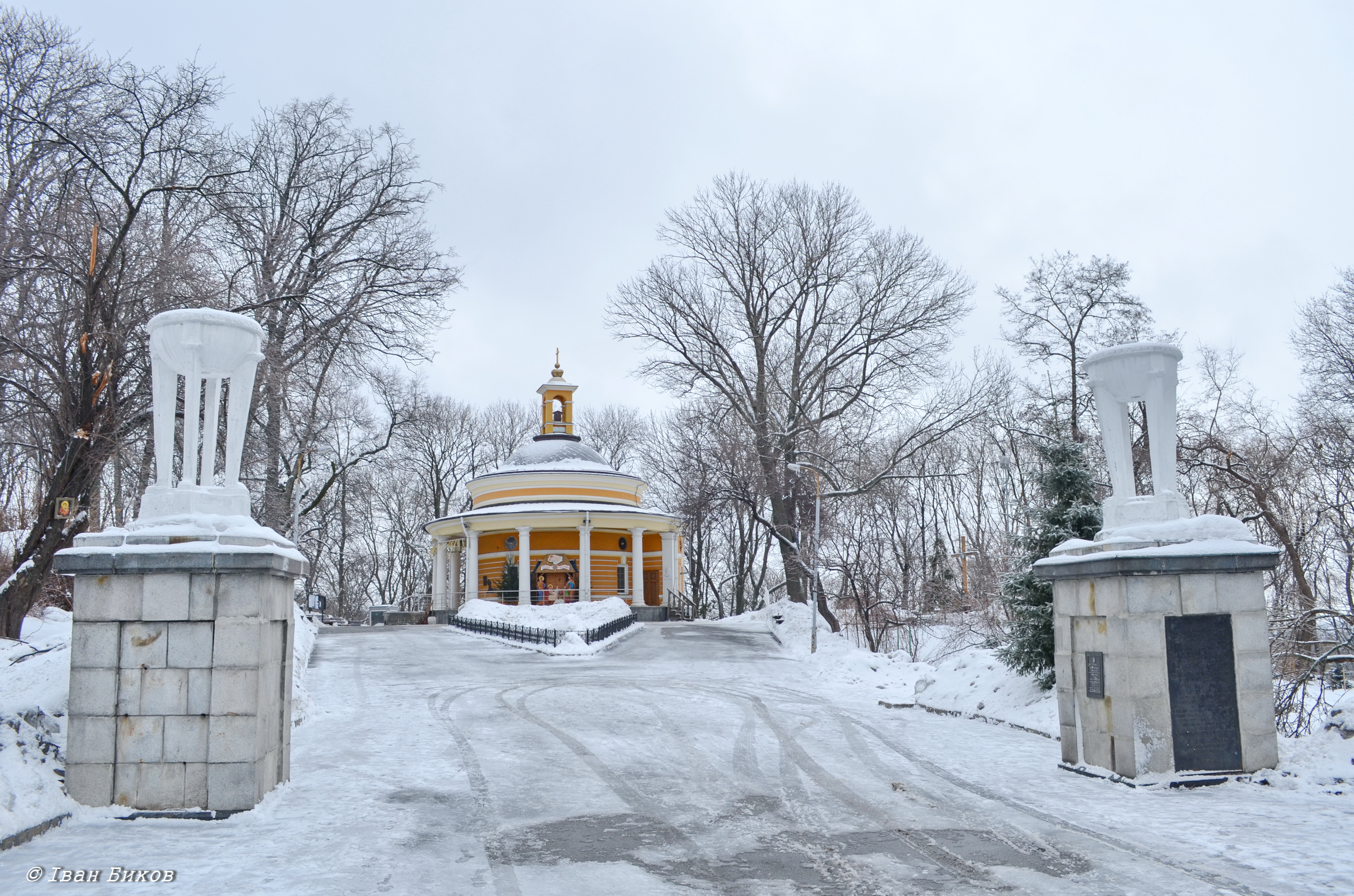
Winter 2013
