= Nadezhda Repina =

Russian opera singer

Portrait of Nadezhda Repina

Nadezhda Vasilyevna Repina (Russian: Наде́жда Васи́льевна Ре́пина) (7 October [O.S. 25 September] 1809 – 2 December [O.S. 20 November] 1867) was a Russian actress and singer (soprano).

She was the daughter of a serf actor and musician in the troupe of a landlord called Stolypin, who in 1798 sold him to the Imperial troupe. Serf actors, once in the Imperial troupe, immediately were free people. So Nadezhda was born free.

Vasily Repin became a musician in the orchestra of the Moscow Imperial troupe, and gave his daughter in 1816 at the Moscow Imperial theater college. Her musical and acting talent were noticed right away.

She made her debut in several operas and vaudevilles in 1823.

At this time the Moscow Imperial troupe not had its theaters – they all were burned. Performances were held in the homes of wealthy Muscovites. At the end of 1824, a rich merchant Vasily Vargin gave his house to the Moscow Imperial troupe – now this is Maly Theatre (Moscow), it was opened on 14 October 1824.

At the same time, architects Andrei Mikhailov and Joseph Bové had built a new theatre on the place of the burnt theatre of Michael Maddox – now this is Bolshoi Theatre; it opened on 18 January 1825.

Nadezhda Repina became the first prima donna these theaters. Her talent took all genres: opera, operetta, comedy, vaudeville, drama, tragedy.

Many playwrights wrote leading roles for her in their plays (Dmitry Lensky, Aleksander Pisarev). Sergei Aksakov called her the “adornment of the Moscow stage”.

She was especially successful in comedies and vaudevilles where her partner was the famous Russian actor Mikhail Shchepkin.

She was a pupil and then wife of the composer Alexey Verstovsky. He wrote his operas and musical vaudevilles for her.

Among Nadezhda Repina's roles:

- Masha – Ivan Susanin, opera of Catterino Cavos
- Zerlina – Don Giovanni, opera of Mozart
- Angèle – Le domino noir, opéra comique of Daniel Auber
- Yulia – Pan Tvardovsky, opera of Alexey Verstovsky
- Suzanne – The Marriage of Figaro, play of Pierre Beaumarchais
- Ophelia – Hamlet, play of William Shakespeare (1837; music author is a composer Alexander Egorovich Varlamov; Pavel Mochalov as Hamlet)
- Luise – Intrigue and Love, play of Friedrich Schiller
- Nadezhda – Askold's Grave, opera of Alexey Verstovsky
- Sofia – Woe from Wit, play of Alexander Griboyedov
- Liza – Lev Gurych Sinichkin (Лев Гурыч Синичкин), play of Dmitry Lensky (author's version of the plot of French play Le Père de la débutante of Jean-François Bayard and Emmanuel Théaulon), with music of Alexey Verstovsky

etc.

The repertoire of Nadezhda Repina was huge; she sang some 100 operatic roles, not counting roles in drama performances.

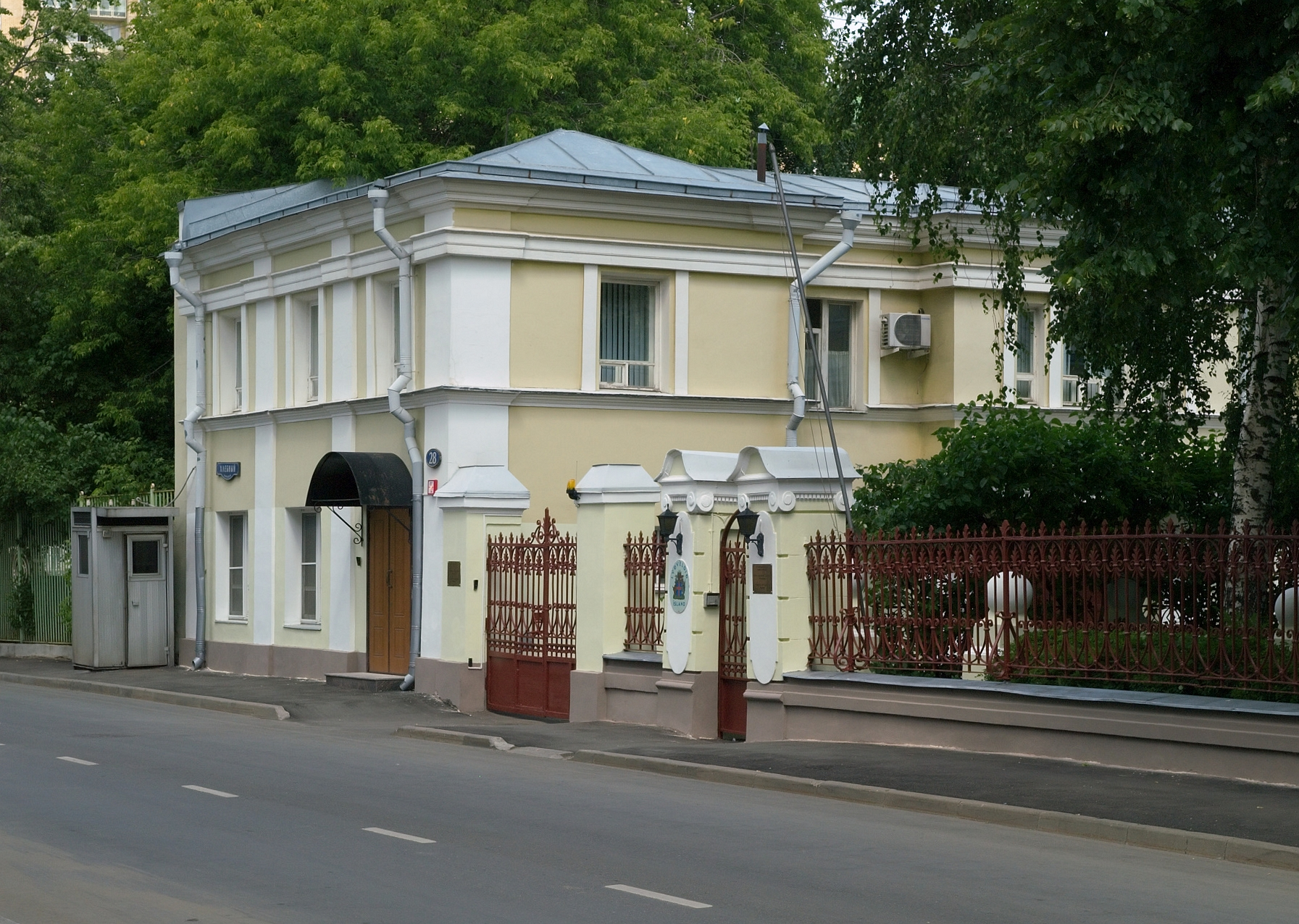
Moscow, Khlebny lane, 28 (present address). House of family Verstovsky. Modern view

Alexey Verstovsky was not only a composer, he became the head of Music department at the Moscow Imperial troupe. He knew that would be expected large changes and, fearing that they would affect to his wife, asked without her knowledge to the Directorate for her dismissal.

She knew nothing about this. Her dismissal was held in 1841. When she heard of it, she fainted.

Nadezhda Repina and Alexey Verstovsky made the official church marriage. Her acting was over. She was 32 years old, still had many years of empty and useless life. From time to time, she continued to come backstage and helped councils of young actresses. But it was quite a different life. Her partner, actor S. Solovyov wrote that she was interested of only one thing: her acting, without it she could not live, and she was very grieved at her inaction.

Alexey Verstovsky died in their house in Khlebny lane 17 November [O.S. 5 November] 1862. She survived her husband for five years. She died in the same house 1 November [O.S. 20 October] 1867.

One newspaper wrote the obituary: "With its leaving the Moscow scene suffered a great loss, and God knows when and by whom it will be recharged. At least, still a place of unforgettable actress remains vacant. True talents are not born, as mushrooms".
