= Alexander Bantyshev =

Russian opera singer

Bantyshev, Alexander Olimpievich (Russian: Бáнтышев, Алекса́ндр Оли́мпиевич) (1804, Uglich - 1860) was a Russian tenor opera singer.

He was an ordinary member of a choir when, with the assistance of the composer Alexey Verstovsky, he was accepted by the Bolshoi Theatre in Moscow as a soloist. He sang there with great success for 25 years. He had bright, beautiful tenor voice for which he was nicknamed the "Moscow Nightingale". His best role was the role of Torop (or Toropka) in Askold's Grave. He was also a composer of several romances.
