= Askold's Grave (opera) =

- Opera by Alexey Verstovsky
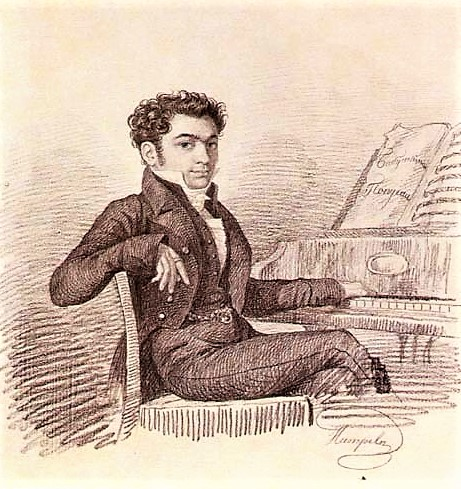
- The composer
- Native title: Аскольдова могила
- Librettist: Mikhail Zagoskin
- Language: Russian
- Premiere: 16 September 1835; Bolshoi Theatre, Moscow

Askold's Grave (also: Askold's Tomb, Russian: Аскольдова могила – Askol’dova mogila) is an opera in four acts by Alexey Verstovsky with a libretto by Mikhail Zagoskin.

It was the most successful of Verstovsky's six operas, and its popularity even overshadowed Glinka’s two operas. It is a romantic opera with spoken dialogue, influenced by Weber's Der Freischütz, the latter having become popular in Russia after its first Russian performance in 1824. The role of Torop was created specifically for Alexander Bantyshev.

== Performance history ==
The title page of the 1963 edition of the vocal score of Askold's Grave

The directors of the Imperial Theatres paid 2,000 rubles to the composer for this opera. The opera was first staged at the Bolshoi in Moscow on 16 September 1835, a year before Glinka's A Life for the Tsar. The main female role, Nadezhda, was portrayed by the wife of the composer, Nadezhda Repina (1809–1897), the daughter of a serf-musician. Among the other performers: Alexander Bantyshev as Torop, Nikolai Lavrov as Neizvestnyi (the Unknown Man), Pavel Schepin as Vseslav, Vasiliy Jivokini as Frelaf, Nicolay Nikiforov as Blum; choreographer of Russian dances: Ivan Lobanov.

In St. Petersburg the opera was staged on August 27, 1841, with the famous bass Osip Petrov in the role of Neizvestnyi (the Unknown Man); Leon Leonov as Torop.

It has been claimed that the music was polished up by Gioacchino Rossini, based on Verstovsky's ideas, for a fee that covered a gambling debt. Two piano transcriptions (without voice) were published — one made by Konstantin Vilboa, another by a composer Alexander Gurilyov. A vocal score was produced by O. Dutsh and K. Yevgeniev (published in 1866).

By the end of the 1860s the opera had received about 200 performances in St. Petersburg and 400 in Moscow. It was the first Russian opera performed in the United States (in 1869). For this staging some fragments of Glinka's music were added to the opera. After the composer's death another version of the score was made with the orchestration by K. Voyachek, with spoken dialogue replaced by primitive recitatives.

Russian singer Feodor Chaliapin chose the role of Neizvestnyi (the Unknown Man) for his benefice on March 3, 1891, when he was 18.

A 1914 performance in the Sergei Zimin’s theater in Moscow had a huge success.

In the Soviet era the opera was forgotten for several decades, and was only revived near the end of the Second World War in 1944 at the Moscow Theatre of Operetta under the title Украденная невеста (Ukradennaya Nevesta – The Stolen Bride), however with not much success. It returned to the stage on November 28, 1959, with a revised version of the libretto by N. Biryukov and musical rearrangement by B. Dobrokhotov. It was given at the Kyiv State Opera Theatre, staged by V. Sklarenko and conducted by P. Grigorov.

== Roles ==
With the names of the singers (where known) who created the roles at the Bolshoi Theatre, Moscow, in 1835:

- Neizvestnyi (The Unknown Man) – high bass or baritone / Nikolai Lavrov
- Torop, young townsman – dramatic tenor / Alexander Bantyshev
- Vseslav – lyrical tenor / Pavel Shchepin
- Alexey, the old fisherman – spoken role / Volkov
- Nadezhda, his daughter – dramatic soprano/ Nadezhda Repina
- Lyubasha, her friend – soprano / Stremyannaya
- Vyshata, boyarin – bass / Nikolai Nikiforov
- Frelaf, Varangian – tenor / Vasiliy Zhivokini
- Buslayevna, the nursemaid – soprano / Agrafena Saburova
- Stemid, druzhinnik (combatant) – lyrical tenor / Kunikov
- Yurka, chelyadinetz (the servant) of Vyshata – baritone
- Sadko, chelyadinetz (the servant) of Vyshata – baritone
- Vakhrameyevna, witch – contralto
- Ghost of Rogneda – dramatic soprano
- Old visitor – spoken role
- Young visitor – spoken role
- Third visitor – spoken role
- First druzhinnik (combatant) – spoken role
- Second druzhinnik (combatant) – spoken role
- Tudosha, the girl from the village Predislavino – spoken role
- Chorus

== Synopsis ==
The opera is based on the events of the early history of Russia. Askold and Dir were Rurik’s men who settled in Kyiv in the 9th century. According to the Russian Primary Chronicle, Oleg of Novgorod, the successor to Rurik, conquered Kyiv around 882. He killed Askold and Dir. Olga of Kiev built two churches at the place of their burial. The memorial on the bank of Dnieper River named “Askold’s Grave” still exists.

The action takes place in Kyiv near the Grave of Kniaz (or Prince) Askold at the end of 10th century — the first years of the rule of Kniaz Sviatoslav I, Prince of Kiev (it was Kniaz Vladimir I of Kiev in the novel and also in the newer versions of the opera, however, at the time of the first staging, the ruling representatives of tsar's dynasty were not allowed to the stage).

Basically this is a love story of orphan Vseslav, the favourite of Kniaz Sviatoslav, and Nadezhda, the daughter of a fisherman. They are preparing for the wedding. Suddenly a strange person called Neizvestnyi (the Unknown Man) appears onstage. He seeks revenge for the murder of Kniaz Askold, the previous governor of Kyiv. He has chosen Vseslav as a tool for this revenge, telling him that the latter is a grandson of Kniaz Askold, and the actual successor to the Prince’s throne. The Unknown Man persuades him to betray Kniaz Svyatoslav, kill him and take his place. But Vseslav rejects this plan. The action is luxuriously accompanied with folk songs and dances.

Overture

1. Overture

Act 1

2. Introduction and Nadezhda's Song
3. Choir of Fishermen
4. Aria of the Unknown Man
5. Choir of Fishermen
6. Choir of Countrymen
7. Choir and Song – Aria of the Unknown Man -Finale

Act 2

8. Entr'acte and Couplets of Frelaf and Choir
9. Ballade of Torop
10. Couplets of Torop and Choir
11. Aria of the Unknown Man and Choir in the Ruins
12. Choir of Christians
13. Choir of Christians and Finale
14. Finale

Act 3

15. Entr'acte and Choir of Young Girls
16. Slavic Dance
17. Nadezhda's Aria
18. Torop's Song
19. Choir and Torop's Song
20. Finale

Act 4

21. Entr’acte and Choir
22. Melodrama, Choir and Duet
23. Trio and Finale
24. Finale

== Music and samples ==
In Askold's Grave, the musical characterization of such personages as Vseslav or his fiancée Nadezhda belong to the sphere of sentiment romance. The style of chorus writing is near to Russian folk music. The role of Varangian Frelaf is comic and forestalls the character of Farlaf in Glinka’s Ruslan and Ludmila. The part of Neizvestnyi (the Unknown Man) is written for the voice (bass) of a very wide range and often a high tessitura. It contains some virtuoso passages and incredibly big intervallic leaps, like the major tenth in the second bar of the following example:

The fragment of the vocal part from Aria of the Unknown Man

Sound sample of the fragment of the vocal part from Aria of the Unknown Man

== Recordings ==
- 2 CDs Alexey Nikolayevich Verstovsky: Askold's Tomb, opera – Label: Consonance – Distributor: Koch. Run time: 1 hour 58 minutes – DDD – 794081001529. Performers: Tchaikovsky Symphony Orchestra (Moscow Radio) with Tatiana Panfilova, Lidiya Kovaleva, Galina Simkina, Andrei Salnikov, Lev Kuznetsov, Yuri Markelov, Boris Bezhko, Igor Miroschnichenko, Vladislav Verestnikov, Raisa Kotova, Vladimir Kudryashov, conducted by Yuri Nikonenko

== Score ==
- Song of Torop sheet music free download

== Quotations ==
- «Сюжет Аскольдовой могилы в сущности настолько хорош, что за него не грех было бы взяться и современному композитору и, кто знает... не возьмусь ли я сам когда-либо за него» (Николай Римский-Корсаков) – “The subject of Askold’s Grave essentially is so good that it would not be a sin even for a contemporary composer to put a hand into it, and, who knows... probably one day I will put my own hand into it.” (Nikolai Rimsky-Korsakov)

== Bibliography ==
- Abraham G.: The Operas of Alexei Verstovsky, 19th Century Music, 7 (1983) no. 3, 326–335.
- Shcherbakova M.: Introduction to piano score of Askold's Grave, 1983.
- Верстовский А.: Аскольдова могила. Клавир. Редактор В. Жаров. От авторов (предисловие). Государственное Музыкальное Издательство. Москва 1963 — Verstovsky, A. Askol’dova mogila. Vocal Score. Preface. State Music Publishers. Moscow, 1963.

== More external links ==
- About the historical Askold’s Grave
- About Verstovsky and his operas on Russian page
