= Kruty Heroes Memorial =

Memorial in Kruty, Ukraine

Coordinates: 51°04′52″N 32°09′33″E

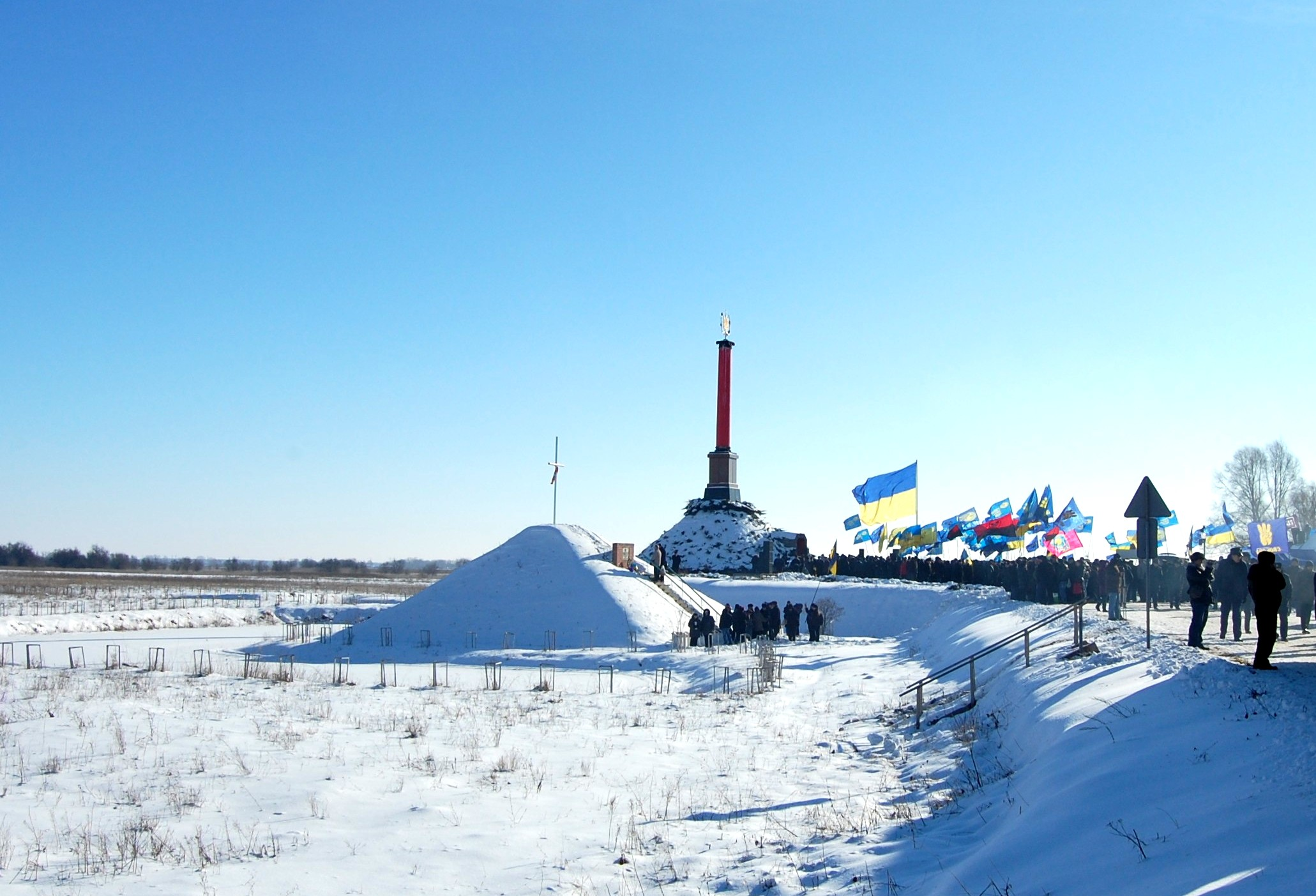

Kruty Heroes Memorial (Ukrainian: Меморіал пам'яті героїв Крут, romanized: Memorial pamiati heroiv Krut) is a monument honoring 500 cadets who died defending Kyiv at the Battle of Kruty delaying the advancement of Bolshevik Red Army on January 29, 1918. The memorial is a 10 metre red column situated on a hill and includes a chapel and a cross-shaped lake. It was dedicated by President of Ukraine Viktor Yushchenko in the village of Kruty, Chernihiv Oblast on August 25, 2006.

== History ==
The events at Kruty rail station have long remained outside the official attention of USSR historiography, providing fertile ground for myths and inventions on both sides. For example, commanding Red Army officer Muraviev claimed to have bravely fought for two days against the Ukrainian National Republic forces allegedly led by Petlura; other claims dealt with the number of casualties, between 500 and reaching into thousands. Muraviev required two days to fix the rail station and reorganize it. There is no official estimate for the number of deaths, but according to the participants of the battle, around 250-300 Ukrainian defenders died at Kruty. Only the names of those captured are available. They were later buried at Askold's Grave in Kyiv.

In Soviet times, the dead soldiers of Kruty were considered traitors or ignored. The student mounds at Askold's grave were flattened and a city park was planted at first. Later, after the Second World War, the area of the monument was used for the burial of Soviet soldiers who died in battles for the Ukrainian capital. Since the initial event at Kruty in 1918, the first memorial action was undertaken in the 1990s by the People's Movement of Ukraine or Rukh which erected a wooden cross. This initiated plans for a more permanent monument. In 2000, architect Volodymyr Pavlenko seriously commenced efforts at memorial design. On August 25, 2006, the Kruty Heroes Monument was dedicated.

=== Dedication of the memorial ===
The ceremony began with a liturgy by the Patriarch Filaret of the Ukrainian Orthodox Church - Kyiv Patriarchate in remembrance of the slain soldiers fighting for independence of Ukraine. Anatoliy Haydamaka, author of the memorial, introduced the monument as a hill 7m high, upon which stands a 10m red column. The red column serves a mnemonic purpose. It is a direct reference to the similar columns of the main building of the Kyiv University, whence hailed the majority of students laid at Kruty. A chapel accompanies the memorial at the bottom of the hill, while a lake in the shape of a cross was dug out nearby. President Yushchenko officially dedicated the memorial, calling the actions of the Ukrainian cadet battalion at the Battle of Kruty - a lesson for the living generation:

I think this battle was a very challenging historical lesson, and it taught us to win and defend our independence.

President Yushchenko noted that for almost 90 years, Ukrainians were forced to ignore this event in their history, "never stop at this site and never even look at this field." In conclusion, Yushchenko applauded those who preserved the site, and allowed "another page of our history to come back to our memory."

== Vandalism ==
The vandals poured the yellow paint on the monument and left graffiti with anti-Ukrainian slogans and obscenities. One of the graffiti was "Long live Russia".

On May 20, 2007, the monument was vandalized with yellow paint covering the statue and anti-Ukrainian messages written over it. The monument's sculptor stated that this was the second time the monument was attacked by vandals.

On 1 March 2022, during the Russian invasion of Ukraine, local officials claimed that Russian forces had fired on the memorial.
