= Nikolai Lavrov =

Russian baritone opera singer

Lavrov, Nikolai Vladimirovich (Russian: Лавро́в, Никола́й Влади́мирович; 1802–1840) was a Russian baritone opera singer.

He sang in Moscow at the Bolshoi Theatre. He possessed a voice of beautiful timbre and wide range, and was especially famous for his roles in the operas Robert le diable by Giacomo Meyerbeer, Zampa by Louis Herold and Askold's Grave by Alexey Verstovsky.
