= Battle of Kruty =

1918 battle of the Ukrainian–Soviet War

- Part of the Ukrainian–Soviet War
- Scheme of the Battle of Kruty.
Date	January 29 or 30, 1918
Location	near Kruty, Ukraine 51°4′46.32″N 32°9′33.48″E
Result	Tactical Bolshevik victory; Massacre of students who defended the station from the Bolshevik offensive; Strategic Ukrainian victory; Capture of Kiev by Russian forces delayed; Conclusion of the Peace Treaty of Brest-Litovsk

Belligerents
Ukraine	Soviet Russia

Commanders and leaders
Averkii Honcharenko	Mikhail Muravyov; Pavel Yegorov; Reinholds Bērziņš

Units involved
Ukrainian People's Army; Cadet sotnia of Bohdan Khmelnytsky Youth School; Student rifle kurin; Company-sized unit of Free Cossacks	Group of forces in battle with the counterrevolution in the South of Russia

Strength
Total: 600 soldiers 500 students 2 armored trains ~100 Cossacks	Total: 3,000-4,000 soldiers 1,000 men (strike force); 2,000+ men (reserves); 2 armored trains artillery battery

Casualties and losses
Less than 260; 36 prisoners (28 later executed)	Heavy, about 300

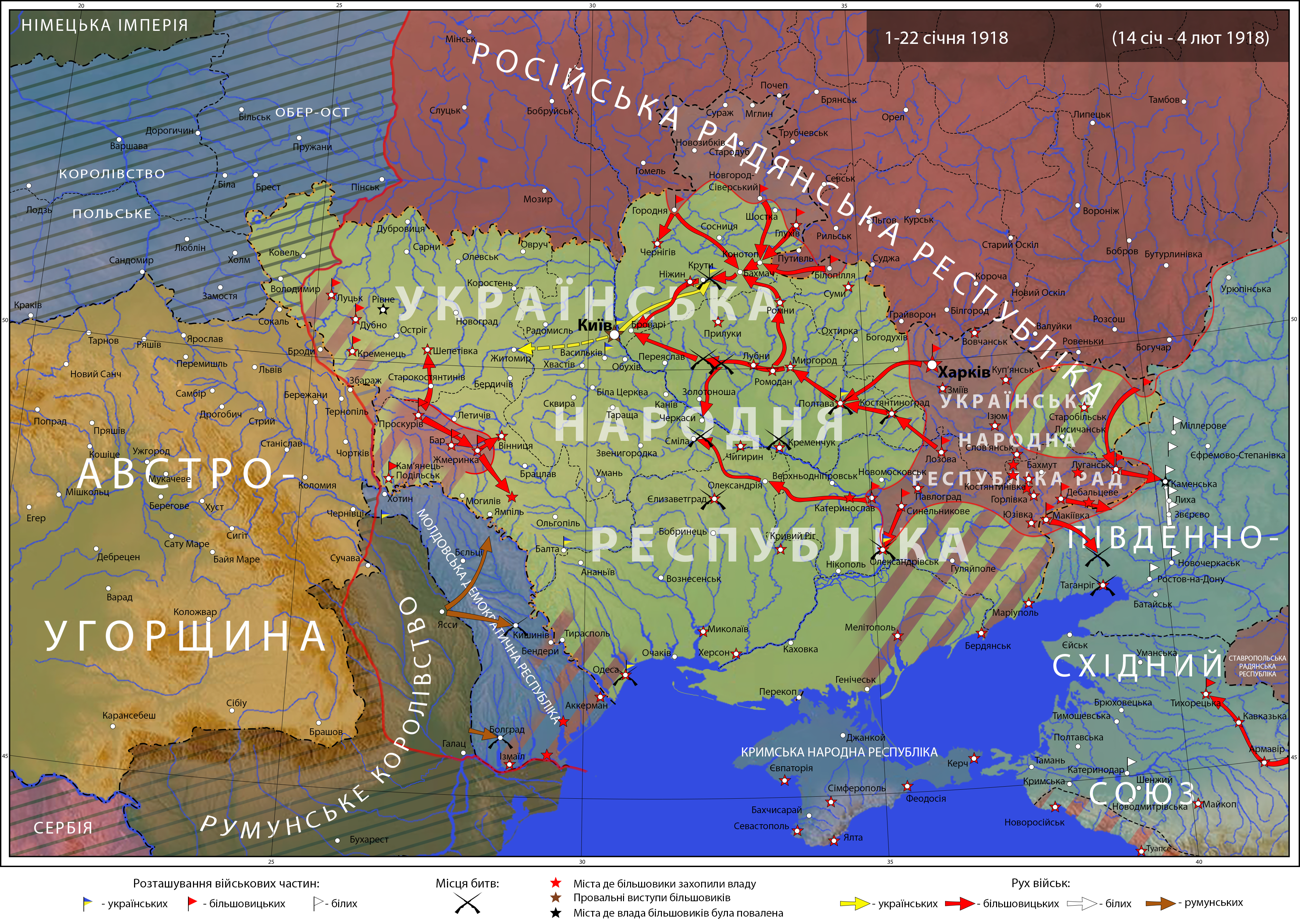
Bolshevik advances (red) and actions of Ukrainian forces (yellow) around the time of the battle in January 1918

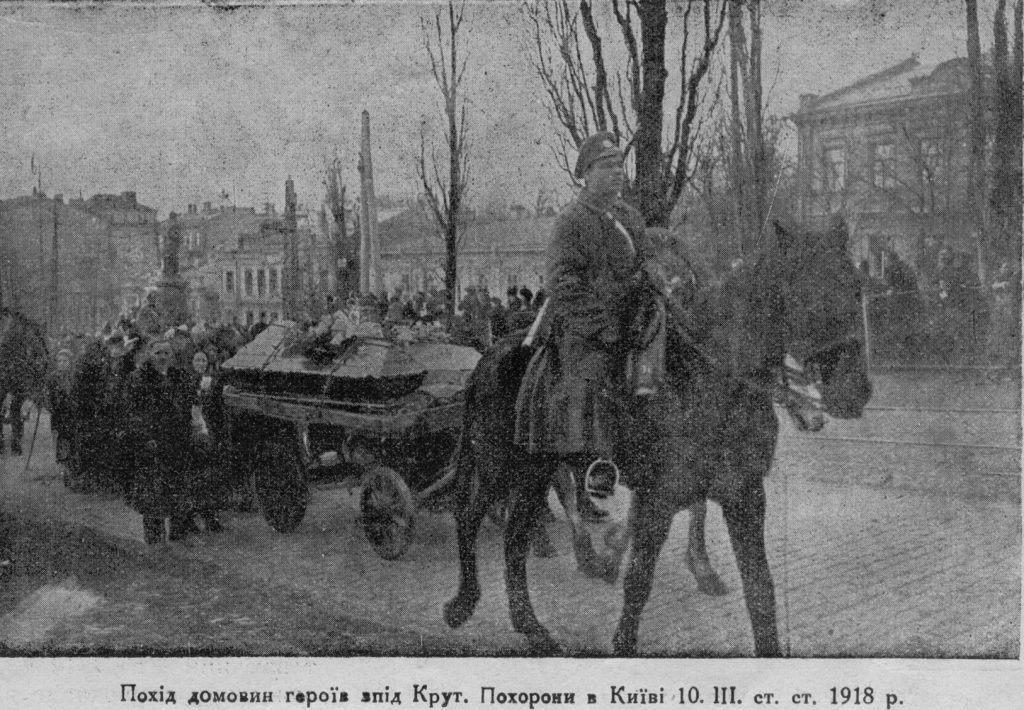
Funeral of student soldiers who died at the Battle of Kruty, Kyiv, 19 March 1918

The Battle of Kruty (Ukrainian: Бій під Крутами, romanized: Bii pid Krutamy) took place on January 29 or 30, 1918, near Kruty railway station (today the village of Pamiatne, Nizhyn Raion, Chernihiv Oblast), about 130 kilometres (81 miles) northeast of Kiev, Ukraine, which at the time was part of Nizhyn Povit of Chernihiv Governorate.

The battle involved a numerically inferior force composed of military cadets and parts of the Ukrainian People's Army, which managed to postpone the Bolshevik advance on Kyiv at the cost of huge losses in its own ranks. This allowed the Ukrainian delegation to win time at the peace negotiations in Brest. The battle became a moral symbol of sacrifice brought by Ukrainian youth in defence of their country.

== Location ==
Starting from the 1890s, the station of Kruty was located at a crossing of two major railway lines and played an important strartegical role. The original wooden station building saw numerous battles during the following period and was eventually destroyed during World War II.

== Order of battle ==
Ukrainian forces (D. Nosenko)

- 1st Student Company (Note: The student company consisted of students from the Kyiv University, the Ukrainian People's University and the 2nd Kyiv Gymnasium of St.Cyril and Methodius.) (Sich Riflemen auxiliary kurin) — Petro Omelchenko (fatally wounded) (116 soldiers) was split into four platoons
- Cadet Corps of the 1st Ukrainian military school of Bohdan Khmelnytskyi (Note: Former 1st Kyiv Konstantinovskoye Military School) — Averkii Honcharenko (~200 soldiers)
- Hlukhiv Free Cossacks (80 soldiers)
  - Cavalry detachment
- Ad hoc armed train (consisted of artillery gun on a flatcar) — S. Loshchenko
- Armored train — M. Yartsev (wounded), withdrew to Nizhyn

Russian forces (Mikhail Muravyov)

- 1st Revolutionary Army (Komdiv Pavel Yegorov) — 1,500
  - Baltic sailors of Remnyov
  - 1st Petrograd Red Guards
    - 1st battalion — Lifanov (wounded)
    - 2nd battalion — Vorobyov
  - 1st Moscow Red Guards — Ye. Lapidus
  - Armored train No. 2
- 2nd Revolutionary Army (Komdiv Reingold Berzin)
  - 436th Novo-Ladoga Regiment
  - 534th Novo-Kyiv Regiment
  - Detachment of Baltic sailors
  - Lenin armored train

== The battle ==
As Bolshevik forces of about 4,000 men, commanded by Mikhail Muravyov, advanced toward Kyiv, a small Ukrainian unit of 400 soldiers of the Bakhmach garrison (about 300 of which were students), commanded initially by Captain F. Tymchenko, withdrew from Bakhmach to a small railroad station Kruty midway towards Nizhyn. The small unit consisted mainly of the Student Battalion (Kurin) of Sich Riflemen, a unit of the Khmelnytsky Cadet School, and a Free Cossacks company.

Just before the assault Tymchenko was replaced by D. Nosenko. Tymchenko left for Nizhyn in attempt to recruit the locally quartered Shevchenko Regiment (800 soldiers) to the Ukrainian side. On January 30, 1918, the Shevchenko regiment sided with the Soviet regime, the news of which forced the Ukrainian garrison of Kruty hastily to withdraw. Over half of the 400 men were killed during the battle, which lasted up to five hours. In Soviet historiography, the battle is mistakenly dated on January 29, 1918 and confused with the Plysky rail station skirmish (uk:Плиски (станція)).

The Haidamaka Kish of Symon Petlyura (300 soldiers) that rushed to reinforce the Kruty garrison and was delayed due to the Darnytsia railworkers sabotage and stopped in close vicinity at Bobryk railway station. They eventually turned back to Kyiv due to the Bolshevik Arsenal Uprising, which occurred on the same day.

Eighteen of the students were re-buried at Askold's Grave in the centre of Kyiv after the return of the Tsentralna Rada to the capital on 19 March 1918. At the funeral the then President of the Ukrainian Central Rada, Mykhailo Hrushevsky, called every one of the 400 students who fought in the battle, heroes. Poet Pavlo Tychyna wrote his poem "To the memory of the thirty" about the heroic death of the students.

After the fall of the Ukrainian People's Republic, the bodies of the students were moved to the Lukyanivske Cemetery in Kiev.

=== Notable participants ===
- Leonid Butkevych, the youngest soldier who was in the sixth grade
- Yakiv Ryabokin-Rohoza-Rozanov
- Volodymyr Shulhyn, a brother of the Ukrainian statesman Oleksander Shulhyn
- Ivano Hrushetsky, later an Orthodox priest who eventually died in a Soviet prison in August 1940
- Mytrofan Shvydun, later continued to fight on the "Shooter" and "Free Ukraine" armored trains and in 1941 organized the Lutsk Battalion of OUN (Organization of Ukrainian Nationalists)
- Mykhailo Mykhailyk, later wrote a detailed memoir about the battle
- Numerous former students of Kruty became the base of the officer corps of the legendary Black Zaporizhians Cavalry Regiment
- Mykola Kryvopusk and Hnat Martynyuk in 1920-1921 served as personal bodyguards of Symon Petlyura, Martynyuk, after becoming a priest, perished in Volyn in 1943 under unknown circumstances
- Serhiy Zakhvalsky, eventually became an officer in the Polish Army, however, he was renowned for imprisoning a whole company of the Red Army in 1920, while heading one of the cavalry squads of the Zaliznyak Cavalry Regiment
- Averkiy Honcharenko, in 1943 became one of the organizers of the SS Halychyna of which he was appointed a commander in 1945
- Petro Franchuk, one of the members of SS Halychyna
- Yuri Voronoy, son of Ukrainian mathematician Georgy Voronoy, performed the first human kidney transplant in 1933

== Legacy ==
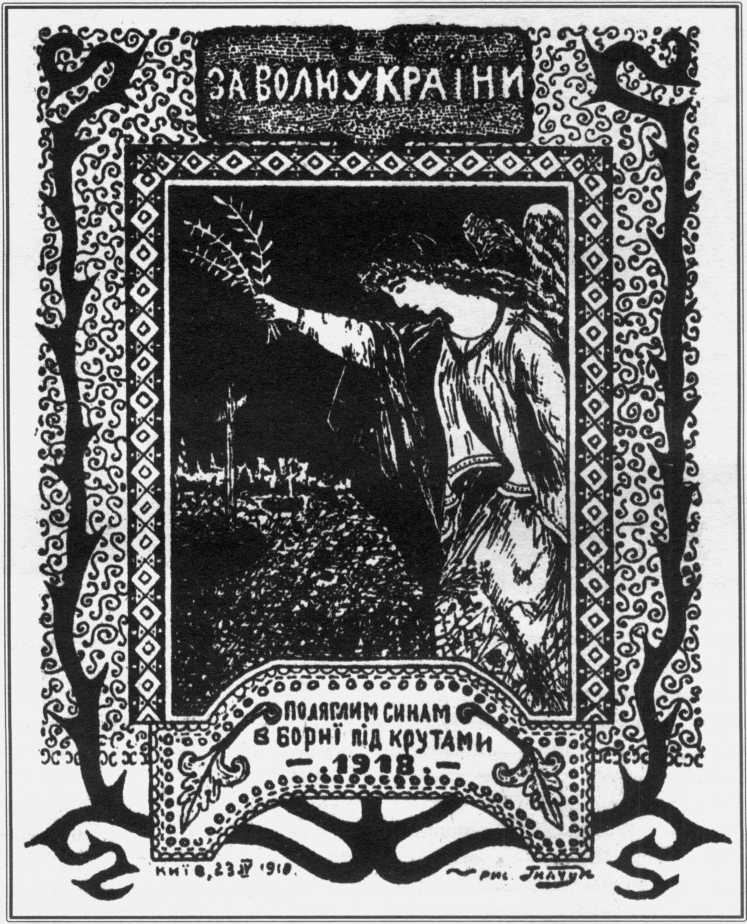
Poster of the Ukrainian People's Republic, referring to the Battle of Kruty. Text: "For the freedom of Ukraine / To the sons who died in the Battle of Kruty 1918"

The battle's first anniversary, which included a memorial service held by families of fallen students, was mentioned in Ukrainian press on 30 January 1919, a few days before the new capture of Kyiv by the Bolsheviks. An accurate history of the battle was long suppressed by the Soviet government. The memory about the event was preserved in Western Ukraine and among the Ukrainian diaspora, where it became a subject of numerous poems and other publications.

Poet Mykola Zerov called the battle's participants "Ukrainian Spartans", comparing them with heroes of the Battle of Thermopylae. The battle and subsequent massacre are mentioned in the "Prayer of the Ukrainian Nationalist" by Osyp Mashchak. In his 1941 publication Ukrainian author Yevhen Malaniuk described the battle as "birth of the New Ukrainian".

The battle has been described as the "Free World's First Resistance To Communism" by historian Volodymyr Yaniv, as it was one of the earliest examples of a free people resisting an invasion by a foreign communist army intent on subjugating them, a precursor to the Russian invasion of Georgia two years later in 1921.

On 29 January 1991 the People's Movement of Ukraine installed a birch memorial cross in the vicinity of the battlefield. In 1998 a mound with a stele was constructed nearby. A monument was set up to commemorate the 80th anniversary of the Battle of Kruty at Askold's Grave, and a commemorative hryvnia coin was minted. In 2006, the Kruty Heroes Monument was erected on the site of the historic battle. The battle is remembered each year on or around January 29.

Ukrainian youngsters lost their lives to stop the Bolshevist army of Russian Lieutenant General Nikolai Muravyov from advancing on Kyiv.

— Ex-President Viktor Yuschenko at the 91st anniversary of the battle describing the students

Young people, like Spartan soldiers, died for the sake of their motherland in a struggle against foreign aggressors, and it was an example of their sacrifice and selfless love for their native land. Every anniversary of the Heroes of Kruty is not only a day to honor those people who loved our motherland more than their lives. This is also another reminder to our contemporary politicians regarding their responsibility for the fate of their country and people.

— Ex-Prime Minister Yulia Tymoshenko describing the battle

Near Kruty the Kyiv military cadets and students became the forerunners of the Ukrainian political nation. Having different ethnic roots, they as one fought for our Ukrainian State. As the founding of the Ukrainian People's Republic became the base of the Ukrainian statehood, so the heroism of the Kruty's warriors became the beginning and the symbol of liberating struggles of Ukrainians for the liberty in the past 20th century.

— Ex-President Viktor Yuschenko at the 91st anniversary of the battle

On 1 March 2022, during the Russian invasion of Ukraine, fighting between Ukrainian and Russian forces in the area around the villages of Pamiatne and Khoroshe Ozero reportedly resulted in nearly 200 Russian troops being killed in action, according to local officials. Before the fighting, Russian soldiers took photos near the Kruty Heroes Memorial and fired on it.

== In culture ==
=== Publications ===
A bibliography of sources related to the battle was published in 1933-1934 in Lviv. For the 40th anniversary in 1958 a brochure was published by V.Yaniv.

=== Poetry ===
==== To the Memory of the Thirty ====
At the Askold Cemetery
They were buried,
The thirty martyrs-Ukrainians,
The glorious young...

At the Askold Cemetery
The Ukrainian bloom! —
By the bloody roadway
For us to follow into the world.

Onto whom has dared to rise
The betrayer's hand?
Sun is blooming, wind is playing
And the Dnieper-river...

Against whom has Cain committed?
O, Lord, punish them!
Over everything they loved
It was their loved land.

They died in the New Testament
With the glory of saints.
At the Askold Cemetery
They were buried.

— Pavlo Tychyna, 1918 (free translation)

=== Music ===
Several Ukrainian folk songs mention the Battle of Kruty in their texts.

=== Art ===
A watercolor painting depicting the Battle of Kruty was created by Ukrainian painter and Ukrainian People's Republic army veteran Leonid Perfetsky. In recent times, a mural dedicated to the battle's participants has been created in Kyiv.

=== Film ===
A Ukrainian movie dedicated to the battle was presented in 2018.

== Gallery ==
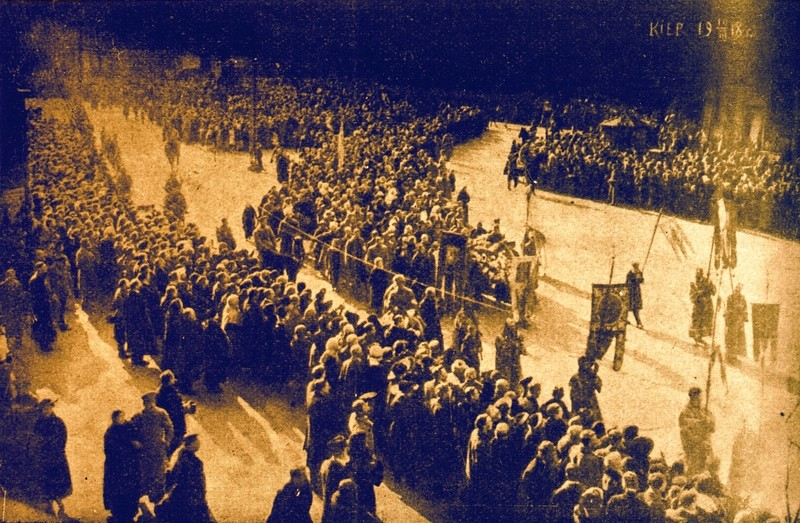
Photo showing the burial of Bolshevik terror victims, frequently mistaken for a photo of the burial of the students fallen at Kruty, 10 March 1918

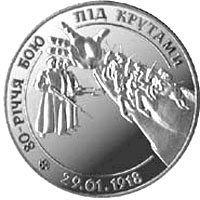
A hryvnia coin commemorating the Battle of Kruty

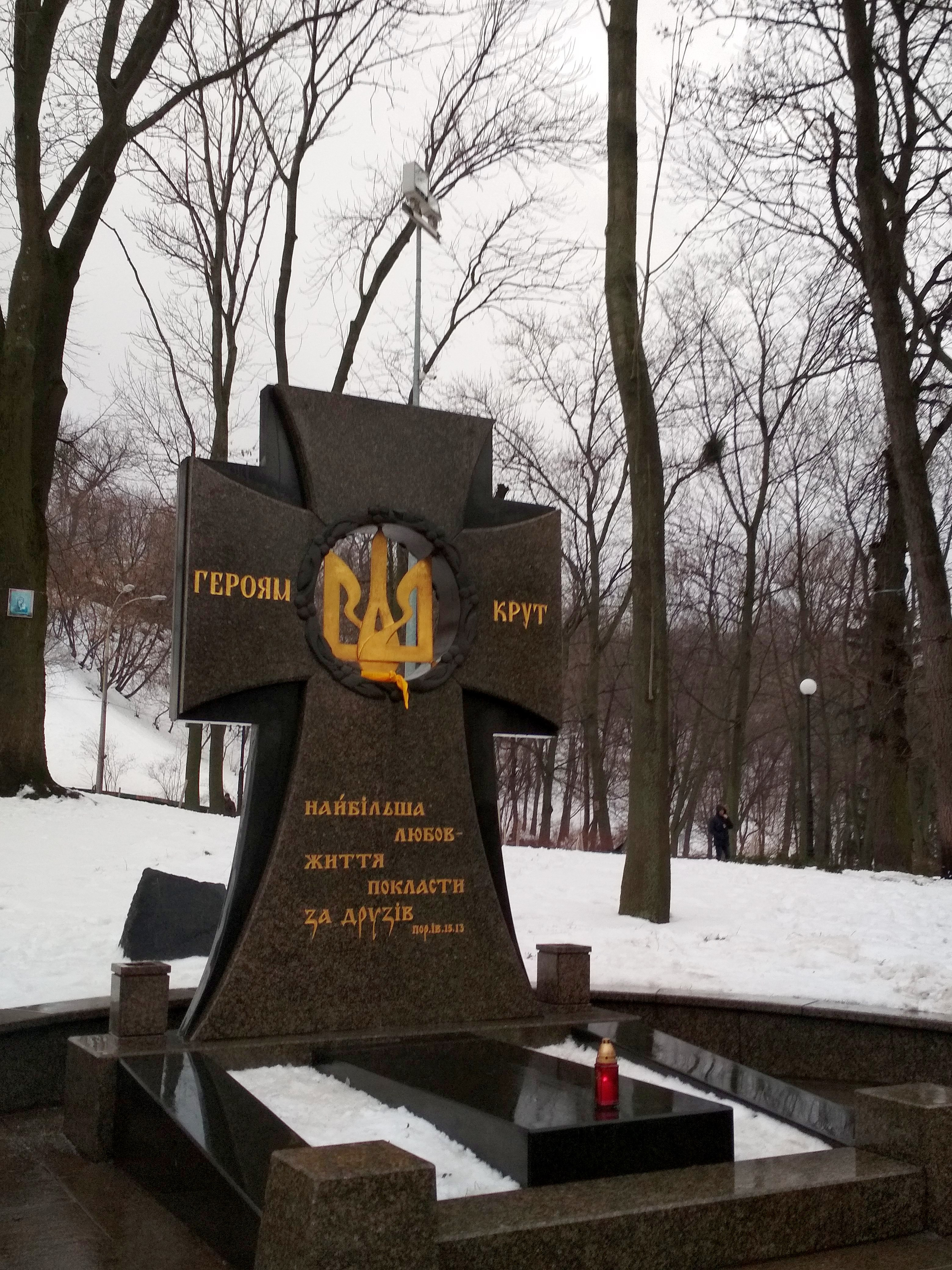
Kruty monument on Askold's Grave

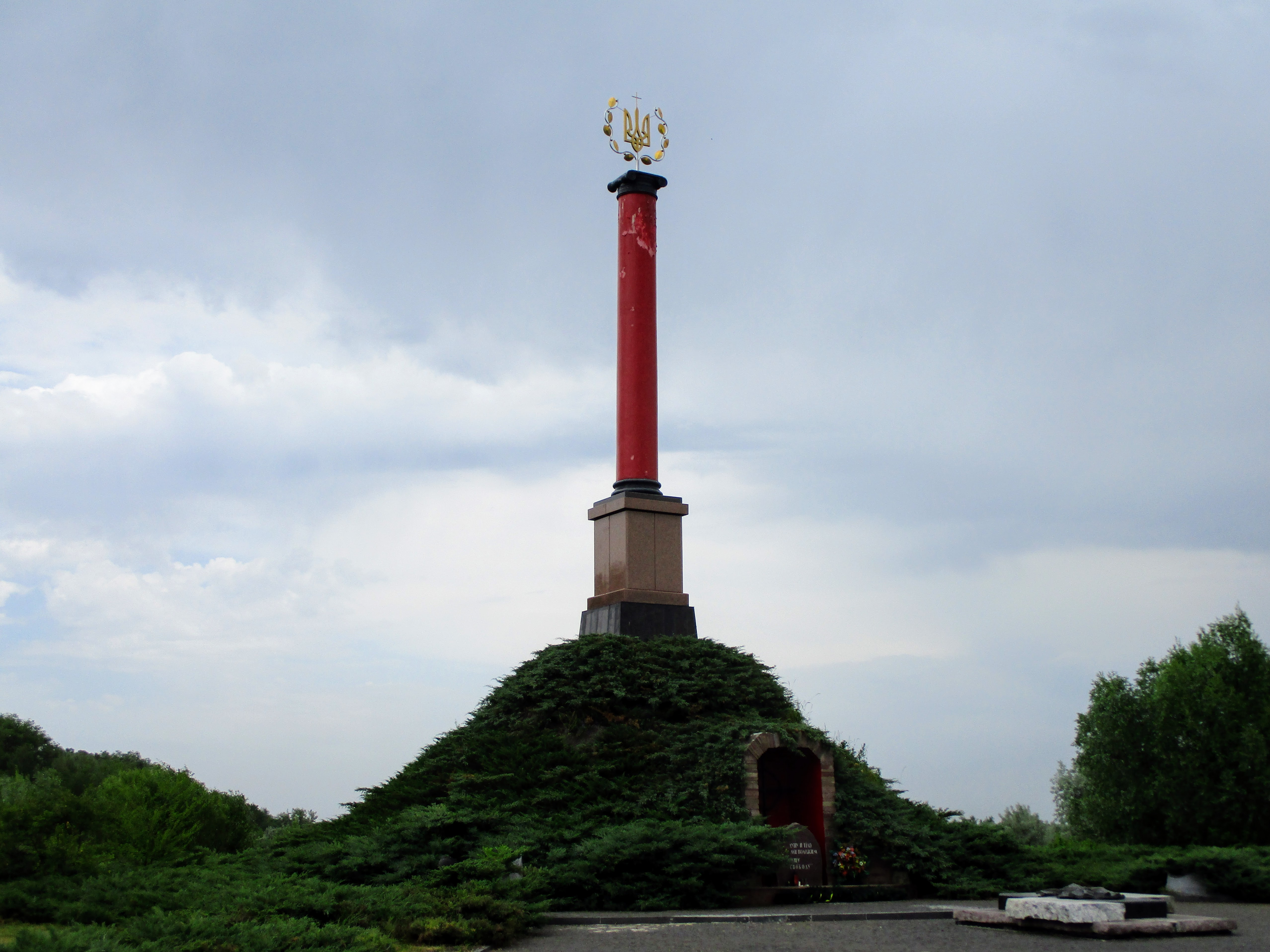
Memorial stele at the site of the battle

== See also ==
- Kruty Heroes Memorial
- Kyiv Arsenal January Uprising
- Group of forces in fight with counter revolution in the South Russia
