= Mark Paslawsky =

American-born Ukrainian military personnel (1959–2014)

Mark Gregory Paslawsky
- Born: January 16, 1959; Manhattan, New York City, US
- Died: August 19, 2014 (aged 55); Ilovaisk, Donetsk Oblast, Ukraine
- Burial place: Askold's Grave, Kyiv, Ukraine
- Alma mater: United States Military Academy
- Military career
- Allegiance: United States Army; National Guard of Ukraine
- Service years: 1981 – 1991, 2014
- Rank: Major (U.S. Army)
- Nickname: Franko (Франко)
- Units: 75th Ranger Regiment; Donbas Battalion
- Known for: The only American fighting for Ukraine at the time
- Conflicts: Russo-Ukrainian War; War in Donbas; Battle of Ilovaisk †
- Awards: Order of Danylo Halytsky

Mark Gregory "Franko" Paslawsky (16 Jan 1959 – 19 August 2014), also known as Marko (Markiian Hryhorii) Paslavskyi (Ukrainian: Марко (Маркіян Григорій) Паславський) was an American-born Ukrainian man who served as a private of the Donbas Battalion, a volunteer unit of the National Guard of Ukraine. He died in the War in Donbas during the Battle of Ilovaisk. He was awarded the Order of Danylo Halytsky posthumously.
