= Lukianivska =

Lukyanivska may refer to:

- Lukianivska (Kyiv Metro)
- Lukyanivska Prison
- Lukianivska (street)

== See also ==
- Lukyanivka (disambiguation)
