= Church of St Nicholas on Askold's Grave =

Historic church in Kyiv, Ukraine

Coordinates: 50°26′38″N 30°33′05″E

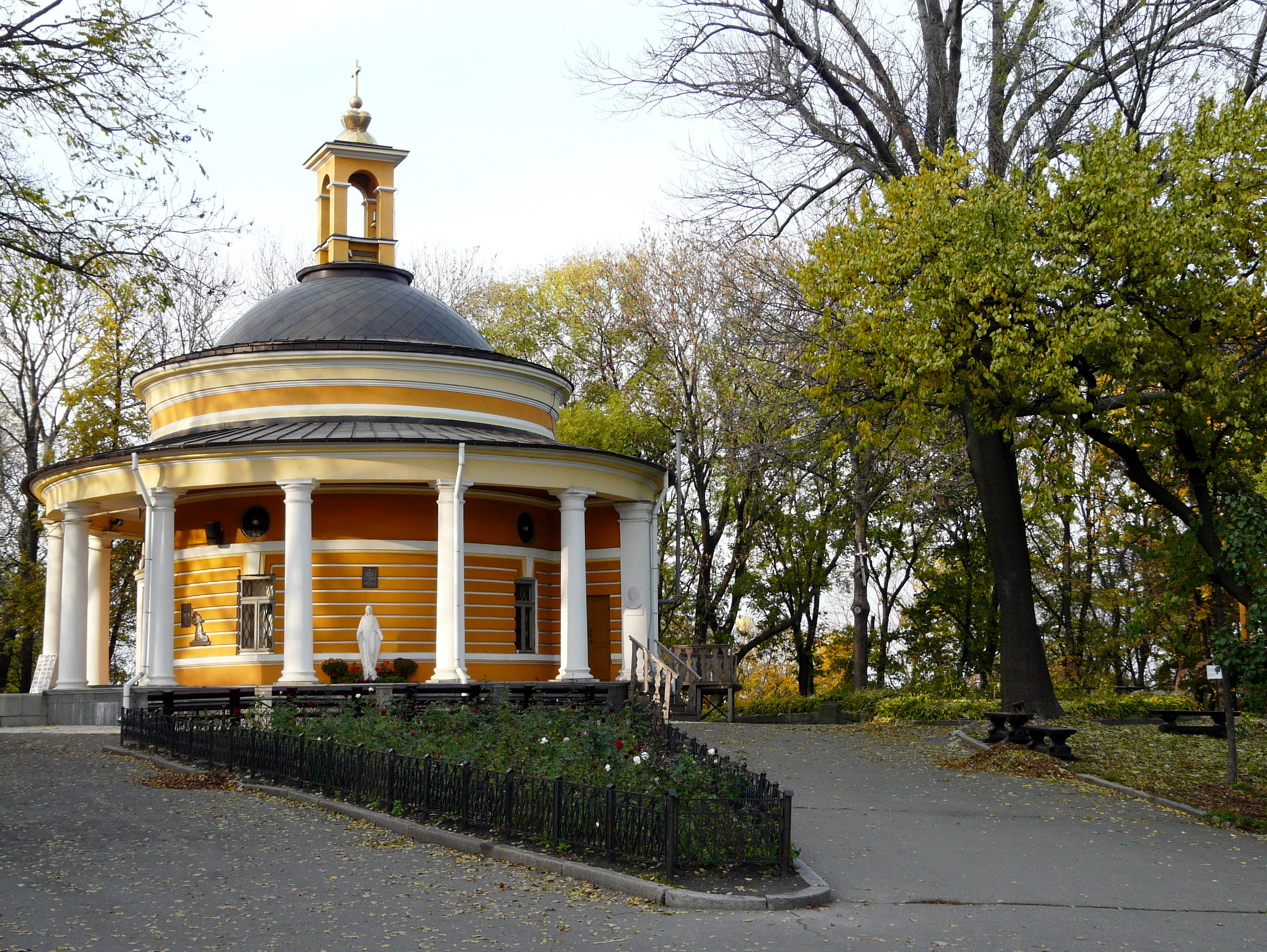
- Church of St Nicholas on Askold's Grave
- Address: 1 Parkova Doroga St., Kyiv
- Country: Ukraine
- Denomination: Ukrainian Greek Catholic Church

History
- Dedication: St Nicholas

Architecture
- Architect: Andriy Melensky
- Years built: 1809–1810
- Construction cost: 8000 rubles

Administration
- Diocese: Ukrainian Catholic Archeparchy of Kyiv

Clergy
- Priest: Ihor Onyshkevych

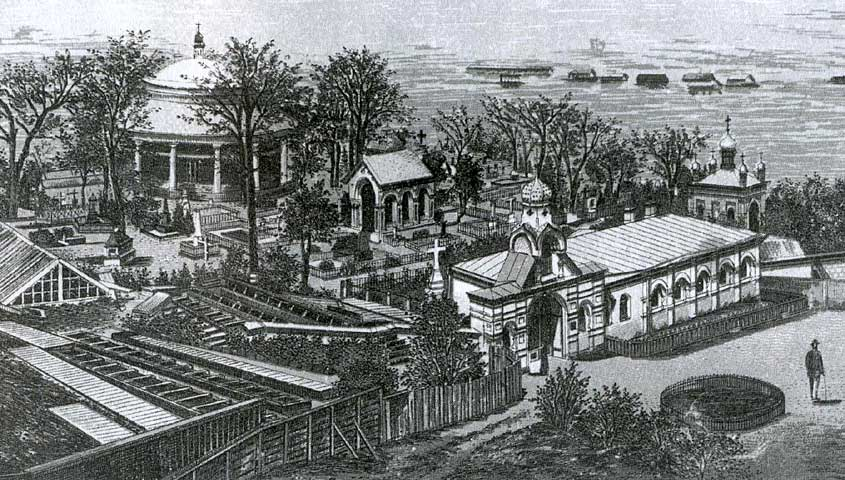
A mid-19th century photograph of the church

The Church of St Nicholas on Askold's Grave (Ukrainian: Церква Святого Миколая на Аскольдовій могилі, romanized: Tserkva Sviatoho Mykolaia na Askoldovii mohyli) is a Neoclassical style rotunda in Askold's Grave, Kyiv.

== Design ==
This former Russian Orthodox church was designed in 1809 by the Russian architect Andrey Melensky and was underwritten by Samuil Meshcheryakov, a merchant from Voronezh. The general contractor for the project, which cost 8,000 rubles, was Vasiliy Serikov. The church was consecrated on 1 September 1810.

== Modern times ==
After the establishment of the Soviet regime, the Church of St Nicholas on Askold's Grave was closed, but from 1921 until 1934, it still functioned as a parish church of the Ukrainian Autocephalous Orthodox Church. In 1934, the church was permanently closed, and the cemetery was destroyed to make way for an amusement park.

In 1936, the church was converted into a restaurant. In 1938, the Ukrainian architect Petro Yurchenko converted it into a park pavilion, adding a Ionic colonnade instead of a dome. The early 20th-century bell tower, the rector's house, and the 1860s fence were all demolished.

The church existed in this form until it was restored to its original appearance in 1997 by the architect Volodymyr Khromchenkov. On 26 April 1992, the church was transferred to the Ukrainian Greek Catholic Church. A church dedicated to Pope Sylvester I is located in the basement. The restored church building was consecrated on 22 May 1998, by the Exarch of Kyiv-Vyshhorod, Lubomyr Husar. The restored crypt in the basement of the church was consecrated on 15 July 2010.

The Church of St. Nicholas on Askold's Grave was the first church to be visited by Pope John Paul II during his apostolic visit to Ukraine in the summer of 2001.

In 2016, a new bell tower was built in Askold's Grave at the expense of the parish church. The bell tower's 51 church bells were consecrated on 22 May 2019, on Saint Nicholas Day. The bells were made in the Netherlands. They can perform a variety of classical and spiritual melodies.

== Sources ==
- Tretyak, Kirill Olegovich (1998). Slyusarenko, A. (ed.). Київ: Путівник по зруйнованому місту [Kyiv: A Guide to the Ruined City] (in Ukrainian). Kyiv, Ukraine: Kyiv University.
