= Agrafena Saburova =

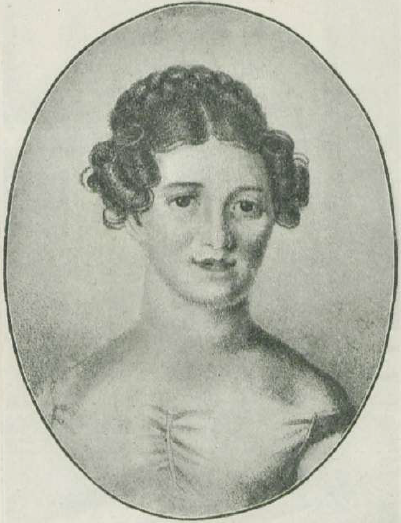
- Born: Agrafena Timofeyevna Okuneva; 1795; Saint Petersburg, Russian Empire
- Died: 2 February 1867 (aged 71–72); Saint Petersburg, Russian Empire
- Occupation: Stage actress
- Years active: 1814-1860s
- Spouse: Alexander Saburov

Agrafena Timopheyevna Saburova (Russian: Аграфе′на Тимофе′евна Сабу′рова, née Okuneva, О′кунева; 1795, Saint Petersburg, Imperial Russia, — 2 February 1867, Saint Petersburg, Imperial Russia) was a Russian stage actress. Originally an opera singer (who lost her singing voice in 1831), she excelled in plays by Alexander Griboyedov, Nikolay Polevoy and Alexander Ostrovsky, first in Moscow's Maly Theatre, then during her short stint at the Saint Petersburg's Alexandrinsky Theatre which she retired from in 1861. Actor Alexander Saburov (1800–1831) was her husband, actress and opera singer Ekaterina Saburova (1829–1905) their daughter.
