= Aleksander Pisarev =

Russian playwright, translator and theatre-critic

- Александр Иванович Писарев
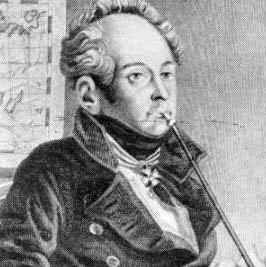
- Born: Aleksander Ivanovich Pisarev; 14 July 1803; Oryol Governorate, Imperial Russia
- Died: 15 February 1828 (aged 24); Moscow, Imperial Russia
- Occupations: playwright, translator, theatre critic

Aleksandr Ivanovich Pisarev (Russian: Александр Иванович Писарев, 14 July 1803, village of Znamenskoye, Oryol Governorate, Imperial Russia - 15 March 1828, Moscow) was a Russian playwright, translator and theatre-critic.

In the course of just five years (1824–28) he authored 23 popular vaudevilles and comedies, most of which enjoyed great success on stages of Moscow's Maly Theatre and St. Petersburg's Alexandrinka. His best-known plays were Student and Teacher (Учитель и ученик, или В чужом пиру похмелье, 1824), The Magic Nose (Волшебный нос, или Талисман и финики, 1825), Caliph's Recreations (Забавы калифа, 1825, set to music by Alexander Alyabyev and Alexey Verstovsky), The Buzzing Man (Хлопотун, или Дело мастера боится, 1825, music by Alyabyev and Verstovsky), and How To Marry Your Daughter (Средство выдавать дочерей замуж, 1828). In 1826, with Alexey Verstovsky, he published the popular Drama Album for the Lovers of Music and Theatre (Драматический альбом для любителей театра и музыки). Pisarev was a controversial figure who, on the one hand used to pan "serious" drama (stating that theatre's mission was to entertain, not moralize) and to lambast Pyotr Vyazemsky and Alexander Griboyedov; on the other, he was himself a shrewd satirist who ridiculed in his plays and epigrams the life and manners of Russian high society as well as some of his literary contemporaries, notably Nikolai Polevoy.

Pisarev died of tuberculosis aged only 24, much to the distress of his friends, one of whom, Sergey Aksakov, was convinced that in 1828 Russian literature lost one of its greatest talents, who had every potential to become the "Russian Aristophanes". "All of our vaudevillians of today count less than this one man, Pisarev", wrote Vissarion Belinsky years later.
