= Afanasiy Remnyov =

Soviet soldier during the Russian Civil War

Afanasiy Remnyov (Russian: Афанасий Ремнёв, 1890–1919) was a Soviet soldier during the Russian Civil War. Remnyov played roles in the 1917 July Days in Petrograd, the establishing of the Soviet regime in Minsk and organizing military resistance against advancing German armies near Bryansk.
