= Pavlo Petrychenko =

Ukrainian soldier (1992–2024)

- Павло Петриченко
- Born: April 16, 1992; Kyiv, Ukraine
- Died: April 15, 2024 (aged 31) near Avdiivka, Donetsk Oblast, Ukraine
- Occupations: Soldier, public activist

Pavlo Viktorovych Petrychenko (Ukrainian: Павло Вікторович Петриченко; 16 April 1992 – 15 April 2024) was a Ukrainian soldier and public activist. He served in the 59th Motorized Brigade and died in battle during the Russian invasion of Ukraine on 15 April 2024, at the age of 31.

== Biography ==
Before the Russian full-scale invasion, he worked as a project manager and participated in public initiatives. Petrychenko was a participant of the Euromaidan and an active participant of the initiative Who ordered the attack on Katya Handziuk, organizer of actions in support of Serhii Sternenko. He worked at the Serhiy Prytula Foundation. In April 2022, he joined the Armed Forces in air reconnaissance.

On 29 March 2024, Petrychenko's petition to limit the operation of online casinos on the website of the President's Office received in less than one day more than 26,000 votes against the 25,000 required for consideration.

Petrychenko was one of the founders of the Telegram channel АРХИПЕЛАГ 95 (transl. ARCHIPELAGO 95).

== Awards ==
- Commander-in-Chief Golden Cross (2023).
- Third-degree Order for Courage (2023).
- Commander-in-Chief's Cross of the Brave (2023).
