= Dmitry Lensky =

Comic theatre actor

Dmitry Timofeevich Lensky
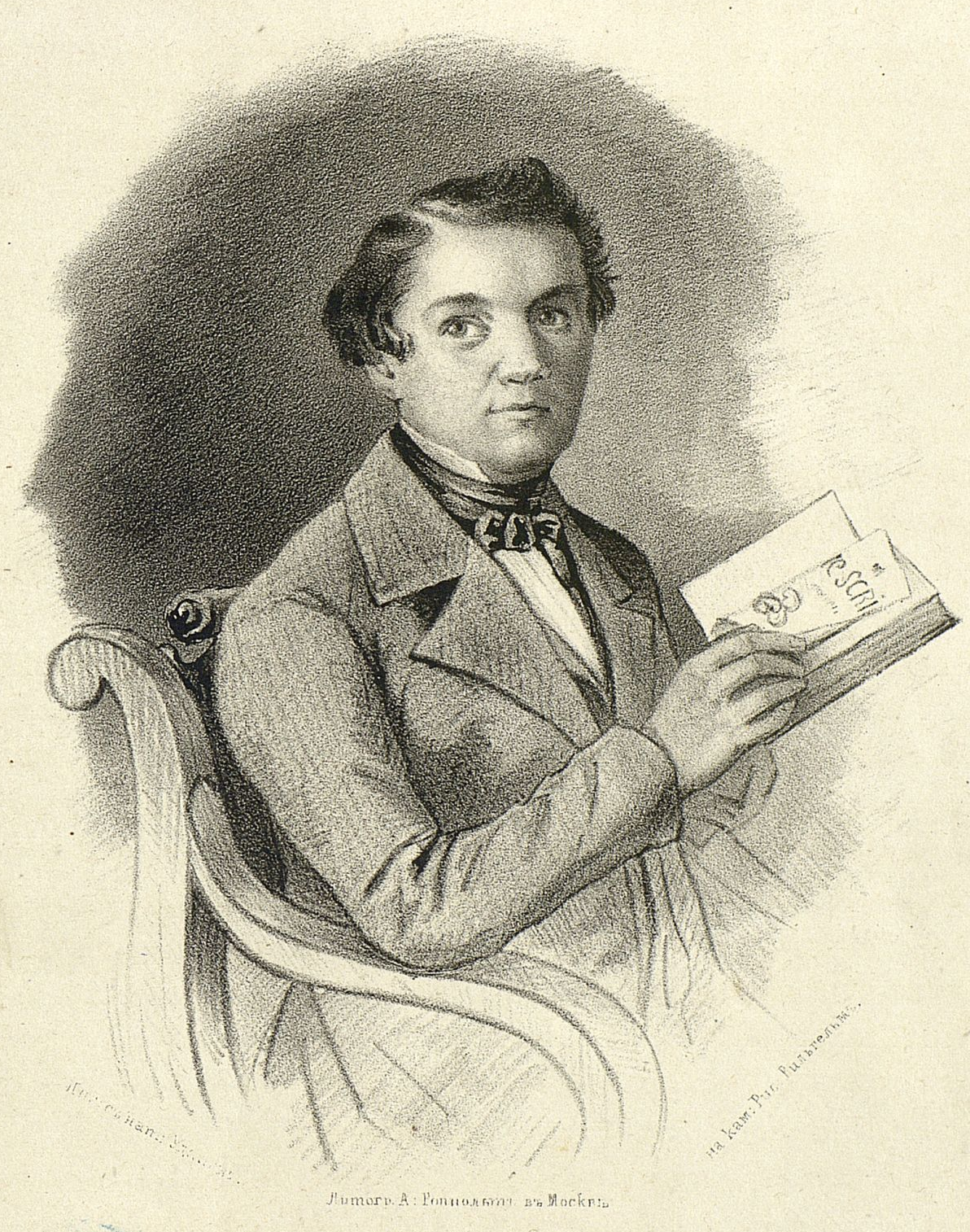

Dmitry Timofeevich Lensky (Russian: Дми́трий Тимофе́евич Ле́нский) real name D. T. Vorobyov (Moscow, 1805–1860), was a Russian comic actor and author of vaudevilles.

Lensky debuted as an actor at the Maly Theatre in 1824, but found success as a writer of vaudeville acts. His best known work is Lyov Gurych Sinichkin ili provintsiabmia debiutantka ("Lev Gurych Sinichkin, or A Provincial Debutante").
