= Lukyanivka =

Lukyanivka, also spelled Lukianivka, may refer to:

- Lukyanivska Prison, a well-known prison in Kyiv;
- Lukianivka, a neighborhood in Kyiv;
- Lukianivka, a village in Brovary Raion, Kyiv Oblast.

== See also ==
- Lukianivska (disambiguation)
