= Alexey Verstovsky =

Russian composer

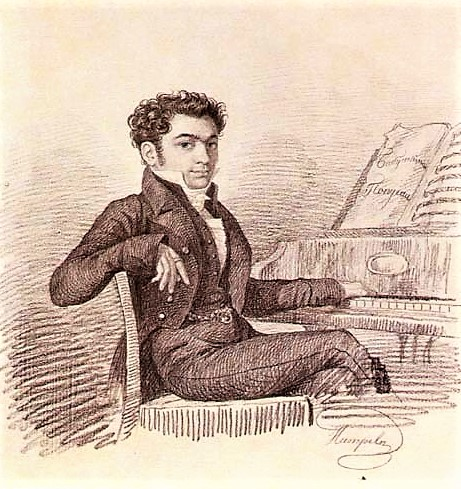
- Portrait of 20-year-old Alexey Verstovsky at the piano
- Education: Imperial Moscow University (1833)
- Occupation: composer

Alexey Nikolayevich Verstovsky (Russian: Алексéй Никола́евич Верстóвский) (1 March [O.S. 18 February] 1799 – 17 November [O.S. 5 November] 1862) was a Russian composer, musical bureaucrat and rival of Mikhail Glinka.

== Biography ==
Alexey Verstovsky was born at Seliverstovo Estate, Kozlovsky Uyezd, Tambov Governorate. The grandson of General A. Seliverstov and a captured Turkish woman, he was also a descendant of the Polish szlachta (gentry or aristocracy). A civil engineer by training, he became interested in music while he was studying at the Corps of Engineers in St Petersburg. He also studied piano, violin, musical theory and composition. John Field was among his teachers.

At the age of 20 he became famous for his 'opera-vaudeville' Grandmother's Parrots (1819). Excited by the success he continued to compose light music for this currently fashionable genre and composed more than 30 of them. He also created a series of ballads for voice and piano, which he called cantatas. The performance of them had often involved a theatrical action. One of them The Black Shawl or Moldavian Song (1823) a setting of Alexander Pushkin's poem, became immensely popular in the aristocrats' salons. In 1825 he was appointed as an 'inspector of music' in Moscow, in charge of the imperial theatres including the Maly and Bolshoi, controlling all the repertoire (from 1830) and chairing the board of directors (from 1848 until 1860).

He turned to the genre of opera in 1828 and wrote six works. The romantic opera Askold's Grave, written on a subject from Russian history, was the most successful of the six. It has been claimed that the music for Askold's Grave was polished up by Gioachino Rossini, based on Verstovsky's ideas, for a fee that covered a gambling debt. First performed in 1835 (a year before Mikhail Glinka's A Life for the Tsar) Askold's Grave received about 200 performances in St Petersburg and 400 in Moscow in its first 25 years. This was the first Russian opera performed in the United States (in 1869). In the Soviet era the opera was forgotten for decades, until it was revised in 1944 at the Moscow Theatre of Operetta under the title Украденная невеста (Ukradennaya Nevesta – The Stolen Bride), and then returned to the stage in 1959 after its performance in a new version at the Kiev State Opera Theatre.

However the "Epoch of Verstovsky" soon changed to the "Epoch of Glinka" and Verstovsky's operas fell into oblivion once more.

He was a friend and correspondent with many famous writers, among them Alexander Pushkin, Vasily Zhukovsky, Aleksander Griboyedov, Pyotr Vyazemsky, Vladimir Odoevsky, and Aleksander Pisarev. However he was not so popular among his colleagues. Glinka avoided mentioning him in his memoirs; Modest Mussorgsky nicknamed him Gemoroy (Haemorrhoid) by association with the title of his opera Gromoboy.

His wife was Russian actress and singer Nadezhda Repina. He died in Moscow in 1862, aged 63.

== Works ==
- Operas
  - Pan Tvardovsky (Russian: Пан Твердовский, libretto by Mikhail Zagoskin, 1828);
  - Vadim, or the wakening of the twelve sleeping maidens (Вадим, или пробуждение двенадцати спящих дев – Vadim, ili probuzhdenie dvenadtsati spyashchikh dev, after Vasily Zhukovsky, 1832)
  - Askold's Grave (also: Askold's Tomb, Аскольдова могила – Askol'dova mogila, 1835)
  - Longing for Home (Тоска по родине – Toska po rodine, 1839)
  - Day Dream or The Chur Valley (Сон наяву, или Чурова долина – Son nayavu, or Churova dolina, 1844)
  - Gromoboy (Громобой, after Zhukovsky, composed 1854, staged 1857)
- Operas-vaudevilles (more than 30) including:
  - The Sentimental Landlord in the Steppe’s Village (to the text translated from French by Verstovsky, 1817)
  - Grandmother's Parrots (Бабушкины попугаи – Babushkiny popugai, to the text translated from French by N. I. Khmelnitsky, 1819)
  - The Crazy House, or Strange Wedding (to the text translated from French by Verstovsky, 1822),
  - Who is a Brother, Who is a Sister, or a Trick after a Trick (to the text written together with Aleksander Griboyedov, 1824)
- Music to Dramatic Theatre
- Cantatas including The Feast of Peter the Great (after Pushkin)
- Choruses
- Songs, Romances and Ballads including famous The Black Shawl or Moldavian Song (to the poem by Alexander Pushkin)
- Piano music, etc.

== Music and sound sample ==
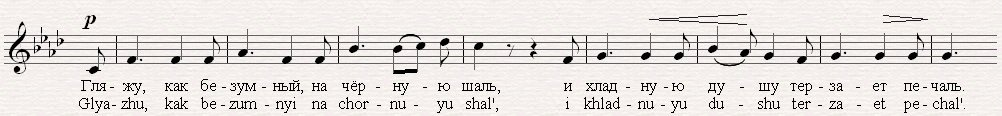
The beginning of the vocal line of the romance The Black Shawl, or Moldavian Song by Alexey Verstovsky

Sound sample of these bars

== Bibliography ==
- Abraham G.: The Operas of Alexei Verstovsky, 19th Century Music, 7 (1983) no. 3, 326–335.
- Dobrokhotov, B.: A.N. Verstovsky, Zhizn', Teatral'naya Deyatelnost', Opernoye Tvorchestvo, Moscow/Leningrad, 1949
- Keldysh, Yu. V.: Istoriya Russkoy Muzyki, 1948. Vol. 1, p. 345–368.
- Levasheva O. E.: Istoriya Russkoy Muzyki ed. by N.V. Tumanina, 1957. Tom 1, p. 216–234.
- Shcherbakova M.: Introduction to piano score of Askold's Grave, 1983.
- Tvorcheskiye Portrety Kompozitorov (Reference book), Moscow, Muzyka, 1989
- Verstovsky, Alexey Nikolayevich by Richard Taruskin, in 'The New Grove Dictionary of Opera', ed. Stanley Sadie (London, 1992) ISBN 0-333-73432-7
