= Without a Dowry =

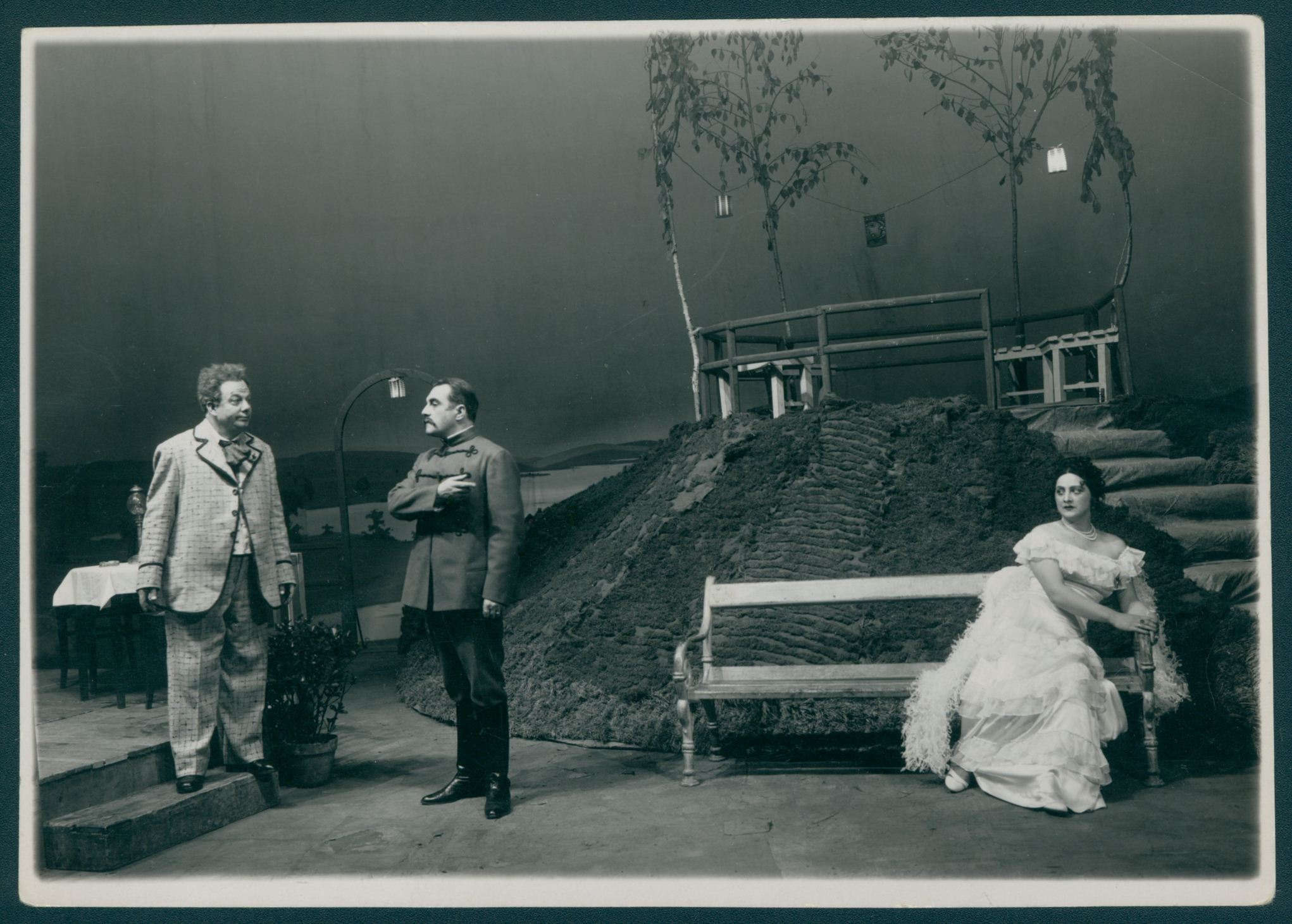
- Original language: Russian
- Written by: Aleksandr Ostrovsky
- Genre: Realistic drama

Premiere
- Date: 10 November 1878
- Place: Maly Theatre in Moscow

Without a Dowry (Russian: Бесприданница) is a play by Alexander Ostrovsky that premiered on 22 November [O.S. 10 November] 1878 at the Maly Theater and first published in the January 1879 issue of Otechestvennye Zapiski. Met with indifference by the contemporary critics, later it came to be regarded as a classic of the Russian theatre. Yakov Protazanov directed a cinematic adaptation, Without a Dowry, which was released in 1937, and Eldar Ryazanov also adapted it into a popular 1984 film.

== Synopsis ==
In Bryakhimov, a "large city on the bank of the Volga River", after a hard, desperate year and devastated by the abrupt (and unexplained) end of her romance with a rich man (Paratov) with whom she was in love and almost worshipped, Larisa decides to marry the first man who approaches her. Karandyshev is a silly, obnoxious and vain person, but Larisa doesn't much care about that, wishing only to get away from it all and to live in the country. Suddenly, Paratov arrives and causes a stir both in the local community and in the girl's heart. It turns out he's about to marry a rich woman and now enjoys his last bachelor spree, selling ships he owns to get money to burn. He finds out Larisa still loves him and realizes that his own feelings for her are also still strong.

Karandyshev, just to show off, throws a party, inviting among others a young man Vozhevatov (Larisa's childhood friend), local millionaire Knurov (who'd earlier told Larisa's mother he'd be willing to become her daughter's 'sponsor' and take her to Paris should she feel inclined that way; the mother is quite receptive to the offer) and Paratov himself. Paratov, to punish Karandyshev for being impolite and to make Larisa see him for what he was, stages a kind of practical joke. Using his alcoholic actor friend's drinking prowess he makes the young man get drunk and make a fool of himself, prompting laugher and ridicule from the other guests. Leaving Karandyshev behind, Paratov, Knurov and Vozhevatov take Larisa out for an impromptu nighttime picnic.

As the party ends, Larisa approaches Paratov and proposes marriage. She gets a straight answer: no, he won't marry her after all, for he is betrothed to that other woman. Larisa feels humiliated, betrayed and compromised. Feeling unable to return home and face her fiancé, whom she now hates, she contemplates suicide. Knurov and Vozhevatov discuss her position among themselves too; they end up tossing a coin to decide which of them will be lucky enough to take her on to a romantic trip to Paris. The older man wins, but Larisa rejects his offer. Drunk Karandyshev appears brandishing one of the Turkish pistols from his collection and implores Larisa to return home. Full of contempt, she refuses. In a fit of desperation, he draws the pistol and shoots her. Mortally wounded, she reaches for the pistol, trying to make it appear as if she shot herself, and even thanks her murderer. "You all are... good people and... I love you all," are her last words.

== Composition ==
According to the author's note, the idea of the play came to him on 16 November [O.S. 4 November] 1874, in Moscow. On 13 October [O.S. 1 October] 1876, informing his friend, the actor Fyodor Burdin about how his work on the Truth is Good But Happiness Better was going on, Ostrovsky wrote: "Now my attention and energy are focused on my next large play which I have been working upon since last year... I intend to finish it this year and am going to polish it with the utmost care for it will be my 40th original work." The play's manuscript has been marked by the author as "Opus 40".

Next time Ostrovsky mentioned it in his 15 February [O.S. 3 February] 1878, in a letter to Burdin: "Now I am busy working on a large original play. I'd rather finish it this winter before the new season starts so as to have more spare time in the summer." Yet, he continued to work upon the play all through the summer and autumn on his Shchelykovo estate, all the while negotiating the terms for the future stage production. On 29 October [O.S. 17 October] 1878, the play was finished, he sent it to Burdin on the 7 November [O.S. 26 October], and two days later it had been approved by the Theatre and Literature Committee.

Burdin appeared to be unhappy with the part of Knurov, which he deemed 'secondary', and suggested some cuts should be made in the text. Ostrovsky wrote back: "I've read the play in Moscow five times, among the audiences there were people whom I'd hardly call my friends, but all unanimously agreed that Without a Dowry was my best play to date. The idea of cutting anything in the text hasn't crossed anyone's mind. But you there, do cut whatever you will, I won't dispute it".

== Production history ==
Without a Dowry was premiered in Moscow's Maly Theater on 22 November [O.S. 10 November] 1878, as a benefit for the actor Nikolai Muzil (who played Robinson). Larisa was played by Glikeriya Fedotova, Paratov by Alexander Lensky, Karandyshev by Mikhail Sadovsky, Knurov by Ivan Samarin. Several days later the play was performed for the second time, as a benefit for Prov Sadovsky, with Maria Yermolova as Larisa. Ostrovsky in a letter informed Burdin of the "great success" these two shows had. In Saint Petersburg Without a Dowry was performed for the first time on 4 December [O.S. 22 November], in the Alexandrinsky Theatre, as a benefit for Burdin. Maria Savina played Larisa and it was her inspired performance that drew all the attention. Otherwise the critical response was lukewarm.

In the early 1890s, Without a Dowry was successfully revived on stage by Vera Komissarzhevskaya, who created her own, unique version of the Larisa character. Konstantin Stanislavski directed production for his Society of Art and Literature (an organisation that aimed to bring together amateur and professional performers) that opened on 31 December [O.S. 19 December] 1896. In the Soviet era, the play was staged regularly in numerous theaters and in 1948 made a return to the Maly Theater's repertoire.
