= Mikhail Shchepkin Higher Theatre School =

Drama school in Moscow

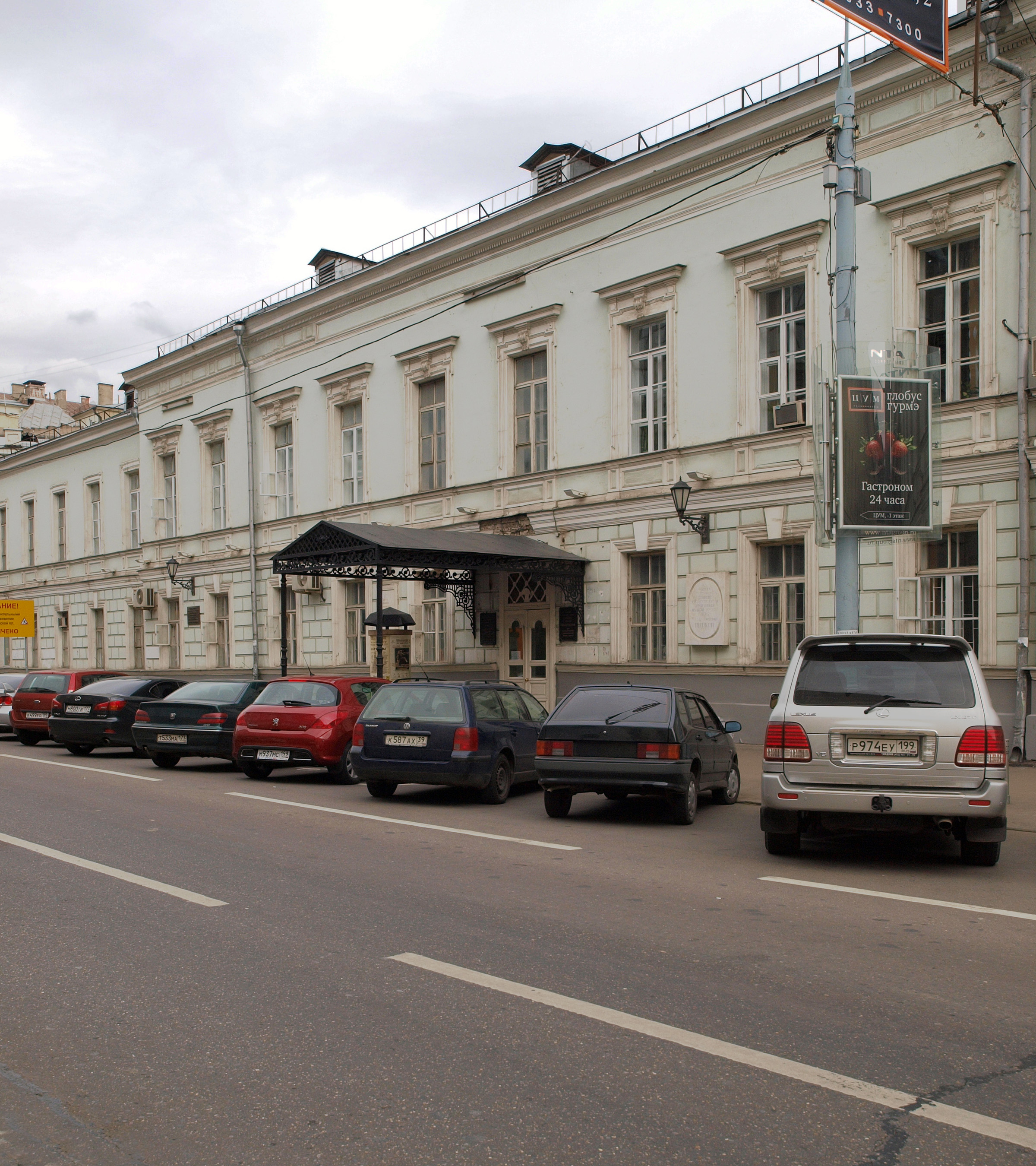
- Under the State Academic Maly Theatre
- Location: Moscow, Russia; 55.760419°N 37.621151°E
- Website: chepkin.maly.ru schepkin.maly.ru/eng

The Mikhail Semyonovich Shchepkin Higher Theatre School (Institute) is a drama school associated with the State Academic Maly Theatre in Moscow. It was established in 1809 by decree of Alexander I of Russia. It is the oldest theatre school in Moscow.

== History ==
Since 1938, the school has been named after Mikhail Shchepkin, a prominent Russian actor and college teacher in the period from 1830 until his death in 1863. With the direct assistance of the Shchepkin School in 1863 received a building on Neglinnaya Street, where it remains to this day.

The school’s identity has been shaped by its direct institutional and artistic ties to the Maly Theatre. From its earliest decades, the school functioned as the principal training ground for the Maly company; by 1909, two-thirds of the theatre’s troupe were graduates of the school. This close relationship continues in the present day. The school is described as “inseparably linked with the Maly Theatre” and as “the main source of replenishment for its troupe.”

In 1943, the school received the status of a higher educational institution.

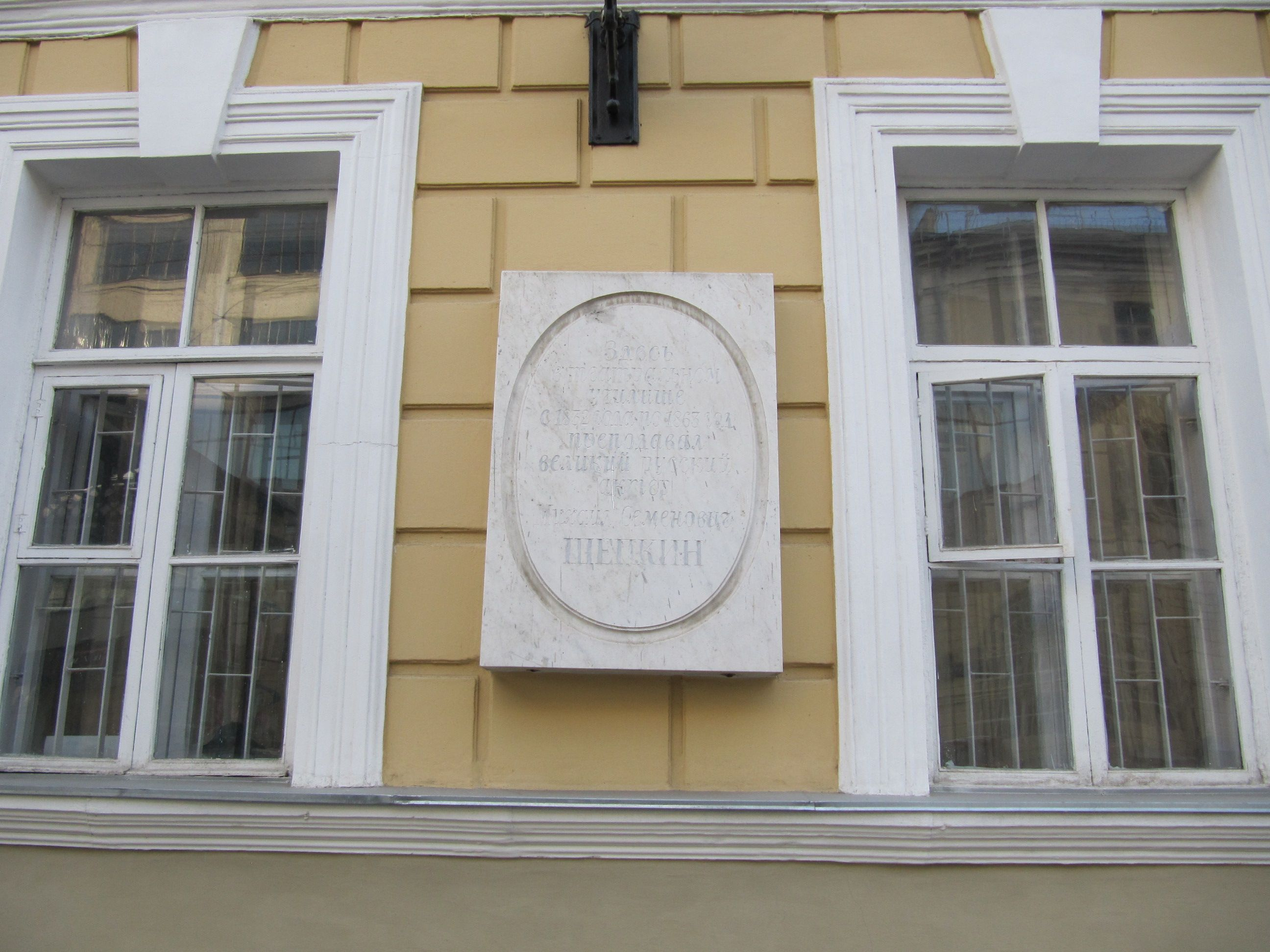
Memorial sign on the teaching in the School of Theater Mikhail Shchepkin

As of 2026, the rector of the school is Anton Leshchinsky, who succeeded Boris Lyubimov; Lyubimov moved to the post of president of the institute. Leshchinsky has said that the two work in “absolute tandem” on key staffing and organisational decisions. The historic building on Neglinnaya Street is undergoing a large-scale renovation and reconstruction covering more than 7,000 square metres, commissioned by the Ministry of Culture; during the works, classes are held in rented premises.

== Alumni and Graduates ==
The Shchepkin School has been a principal source of actors for the Maly Theatre for over two centuries. As early as 1909, two-thirds of the Maly Theatre's company were graduates of the school, a proportion that underscores its enduring influence on the troupe's artistic identity. Many of its alumni have also shaped Russian theatre, film, and performing arts far beyond the Maly stage. The school has been called a “forge of personnel” for Russian theatre and cinema.

=== 19th century ===
In the 19th century, graduates pioneered the realist acting tradition in Russian theatre. Maria Ermolova, who graduated in 1871, became an iconic tragic actress renowned for her classical Russian drama roles at the Maly Theatre. Glikeriya Fedotova, Ivan Samarin, and Sergey Shumsky were instrumental as early advocates of realism, contributing to the evolution of naturalist performance styles.

=== Early 20th century ===
Early 20th-century alumni solidified the school's legacy at the Maly Theatre. Vera Pashennaya, Varvara Massalitinova, Evdokiya Turchaninova, Varvara Ryzhova, Leonid Leonidov, Alexander Ostuzhev, and Yuri Yuryev became staples of the ensemble, excelling in roles that advanced psychological depth in dramatic portrayals. The official history of the school lists Ostuzhev, Pashennaya, Turchaninova, and Ryzhova among its most distinguished 20th-century graduates.

=== Soviet era ===
From the 1920s, graduates such as Vsevolod Aksyonov, Fyodor Kaverin, Nikolay Annenkov, Evgeniy Velikhov, Varvara Obukhova, and Sofya Fadeeva expanded theatre's experimental frontiers, with Kaverin founding his own studio to nurture innovative acting techniques. The school's official history also names Kaverin and Annenkov among its notable Soviet-era alumni.

In the Soviet and post-Soviet eras, alumni continued to excel in theatre and film. Yuri Solomin, Alexandra Klimova, and Konstanciya Roek—trained under Vera Pashennaya—achieved prominence as People's Artists, starring in landmark productions and films that defined mid-20th-century Russian culture. The school's list of graduates from this period further includes Svetlana Nemolyaeva, Pavel Luspekaev, Sergey Lyubshin, Tatyana Pankova, Oleg Dal, Vitaly Solomin, and Inna Churikova.

=== Post-Soviet era ===
Recent generations of graduates have continued the school's tradition in theatre and cinema. The official history cites Oleg Menshikov, Dmitry Kharatyan, Evgeniya Glushenko, Oksana Mysina, Alexander Domogarov, Dmitry Nazarov, Natalya Vdovina, Egor Beroev, Marat Basharov, Igor Petrenko, Andrey Chadov, Pyotr Krasilov and Anatoliy Beliy as testament to the high professionalism of its graduates in recent years.

Graduates joining the Maly Theatre in recent years include Philip Martsevich, Lydia Milyuzina, and Ekaterina Porubel, who have portrayed complex contemporary roles in modern Russian drama.

=== International and global recognition ===
A notable graduate of the post-Soviet era is Yura Borisov, who completed his training at the school in 2013 (workshop of V. Beilis and V. Ivanov). In 2025, Borisov became the first actor from the Russian Federation to receive an Academy Award nomination, earning a Best Supporting Actor nod for his role in Sean Baker's film Anora. This milestone marked the first Oscar acting nomination for a Russian actor in nearly five decades. The nomination received international media coverage. Borisov attended the Shchepkin school, where he trained in acting, dancing, and martial arts. He is a classically trained actor shaped by the school’s Russian realist tradition.

In May 2026, first-year students from the school competed in the nationwide “First Actors of Russia” contest.

The school's ethnic studios, established since 1950, have trained over 1,000 performers from national republics, including Yakutia graduates who formed professional acting and directing troupes in regional theatres across the former Soviet Union. Additionally, graduating classes from the past two decades founded independent venues such as the Moscow Drama Theater «Modern» and the FEST Theatre, fostering new generations of Russian dramatic art.
