= Alexander Ostuzhev =

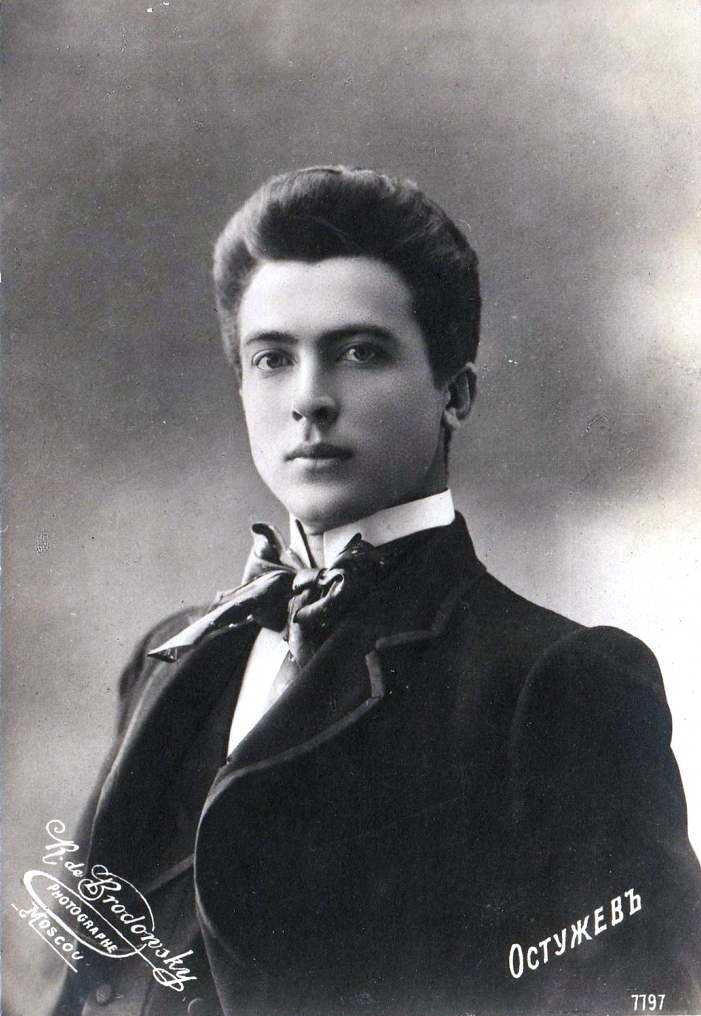

Alexander Alexeyevich Pozharov (Russian: Александр Алексеевич Пожаров; April 28 [O.S. April 16] 1874, in Voronezh – March 1, 1953, in Moscow), better known by the stage name Alexander Ostuzhev (Russian: Александр Остужев), was a Russian and Soviet drama actor. Ostuzhev became the lead actor of the Maly Theatre company in Moscow in 1898.

He completely lost his hearing by 1910 yet managed to stay on stage and play leading roles at Maly until 1952, including critically acclaimed productions of Othello (1935) and Uriel da Costa (1940).

== Early career ==
Alexander Pozharov was born in the family of a railroad engineer in Voronezh. After two years in high school he was expelled after a conflict with the schoolmaster and had to rely on accidental jobs to make a living. He played as an amateur at a local drama theatre where he was spotted by Alexander Yuzhin. Yuzhin invited Pozharov to Maly Theatre College of Acting in Moscow and granted him a scholarship of 300 roubles annually. Pozharov trained at the College of Acting under Alexander Lensky and Vladimir Nemirovich-Danchenko for two years.

In 1898 Lensky set up his own company of actors at Maly Theatre, inviting Pozharov. Young actor adopted stage name Ostuzhev (based on Russian: стужа/stuzha, English: frost), antonymous to his real surname (based on Russian: пожар/pozhar, English: fire). Most common version, later retold by Ostuzhev himself, connects the choice with the director's fear of the public mistaking the actor's real surname with a fire alarm call. Historian Yury Eichenwald proposed a different, perhaps parallel, version, that Lensky chose surname Ostuzhev for being opposite to Alexander's hot temper on stage and in real life. In 1901 the media named him the perfect Romeo (his first top billing at Maly), but soon his explosive personality backfired: Ostuzhev physically assaulted another actor and was forced to leave Maly. Ostuzhev joined the private Korsch Theatre company for the 1901–1902 season and was later readmitted to Maly, where he would play for the next five decades.

== Voice and deafness ==
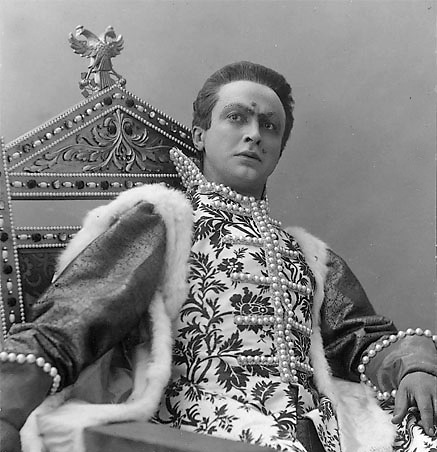
As False Dmitriy I, 1909

Young Ostuzhev was admired for his voice. Tommaso Salvini who watched Ostuzhev as Cassio in 1900 rehearsals of Othello, seriously advised him to pursue a career in bel canto singing. However, Vsevolod Meyerhold argued that Ostuzhev "would have been a better actor had he not had such a beautiful voice" and branded his style "declamatory singsong a la Ostuzhev".

In late 1900s Ostuzhev gradually moved from juvenile, romantic parts of his early days to modern drama, particularly exploring mother and son relationships in a duo with Maria Yermolova (Neznamov in Guilty without Guilt and Zhadov in A Profitable Place by Aleksandr Ostrovsky, Oswald in Ghosts by Henrik Ibsen). Ostuzhev's career could have ended there: around 1908 his hearing, damaged by Ménière's disease, declined, and by 1910 the actor was completely deaf. But Ostuzhev defied disability and remained on stage: in August 1909, approaching deafness, he played the tragic part of False Dmitriy I in False Dmitry and Vasily Shuisky by Aleksandr Ostrovsky (August 1909); already deaf, he played in the new Maly productions of Shakespeare's comedies – Ferdinand in The Tempest, Orlando in Twelfth Night (1912) and Bassanio in The Merchant of Venice (1916)

He designed and followed a rigorous training routine to stay on stage despite the disability; he memorized all parts of each play flawlessly before the first rehearsal, to be able to read the lips of his stage partners and even provided them with accidental prompting services, undetected by the audience. He retained full control of his voice and attributed his later acting success to "concentration within himself" imposed by his disability. Off stage, Ostuzhev retreated into his hobby of metalworking; his small apartment contained only a bedroom and a workshop.

Deafness, coupled with Ostuzhev's reputation of a star, was a significant obstacle to directors; from onset of deafness until meeting director Sergey Radlov in 1935 Ostuzhev never felt being directed professionally. Radlov controlled Ostuzhev in writing with long personal letters.

== Personal crisis ==
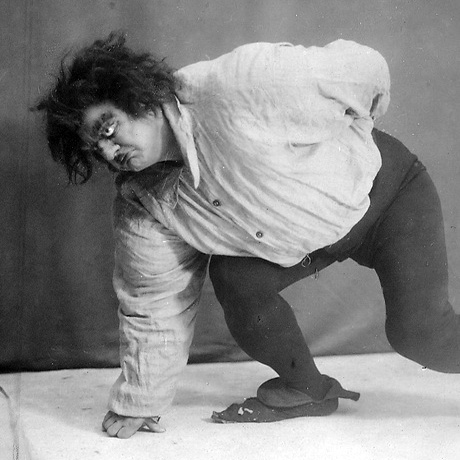
As Quasimodo, 1925

Russian Civil War and early 1920s brought forward new names and innovations in theatre; Maly rejected experiment and remained a traditional old-school drama theatre despised by left-wing critics. Ostuzhev experienced a personal and professional crisis; he retired from his earlier shows, believing that he was too old to play young lovers, and could not secure new, more appropriate, parts in the atmosphere of increased theatrical rivalry. He did not make headlines until the 1923 premiere of Iron Wall by Runda-Alekseev (as Crown Prince) and the 1925 part of Quasimodo in The Hunchback of Notre-Dame. His Mark Antony in Julius Caesar and Fiesco in Fiesco's Conspiracy at Genoa failed to impress the audience and both shows were soon abandoned.

In 1929 Ostuzhev was billed as Karl Moor in The Robbers. The play was a success, but spelled a professional catastrophe for Ostuzhev: between The Robbers in 1929 and Othello in 1935 he got only one part to play, that of Vova in The Fruits of Enlightenment, "entirely alien to him". By January 1935, when director Sergey Radlov began rehearsing Othello at Maly, the audience and fellow actors had nearly written him off but Radlov preferred Ostuzhev to his younger rivals and rediscovered the actor's true capabilities.

== Late success ==
As Othello, 1935

Othello became a late breakthrough for the sixty-year-old actor. "The resonance was unheard of: all Moscow was at the door of the Maly Theatre, the queues formed since dawn." Maly Theatre veterans said that publicity of Othello surpassed the fame of best performances by Alexander Yuzhin and Maria Yermolova. During the first night (December 10, 1935) Ostuzhev received thirty-seven curtain calls. A man in the audience responded to Ostuzhev's monologue with a desperate shout: "It wasn't his fault!". By December 21, 1937, Maly Theatre produced a record run of 100 performances, although Ostuzhev himself experienced a heart attack on stage in the summer of 1936 and was incapacitated for several months. Ostuzhev played an Othello "who was meant to inspire love"; he reasoned that "Othello believed that in killing Desdemona he is destroying the source of evil but in the end his suicide is his punishment of the source of evil in himself". His opinion that "jealousy was not the theme of the play" was followed in all but one of the seventy-eight productions of Othello in the USSR.

After Othello Ostuzhev starred as The Miserly Knight in Little Tragedies by Alexander Pushkin (1937) and in the title role of Uriel da Costa by Karl Gutzkow (1940); the latter became a signature play for Maly.

During World War II Ostuzhev, nearly seventy years old, performed with travelling companies ("brigades") for the front-line troops. "No triumph that I have had playing Othello can compare with the tremendous joy I felt... I felt that the soldiers of my people needed me." He returned to Maly Theatre at the end of the war and continued acting; his last premiere on stage was The Narrator in War and Peace while Othello and Uriel da Costa continued running until his retirement.

According to actress Yelena Gogoleva, Ostuzhev left the theatre in despair when another actor was given the part of Uriel da Costa while Ostuzhev himself was ill. Ostuzhev took the fact that someone else could successfully replace him as a personal insult.
