= Nadezhda Medvedeva =

Russian stage actress (1832–1899)

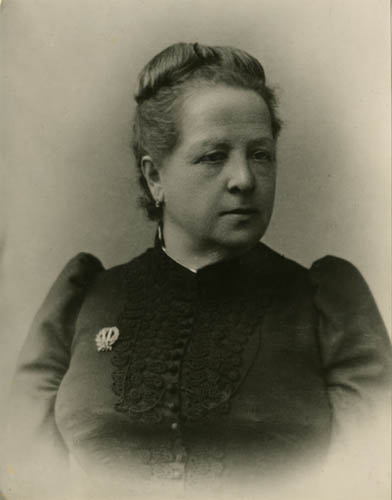
- Born: 6 October 1832; Moscow, Russian Empire
- Died: 24 September 1899 (aged 66); Corfu, Greece
- Occupation: stage actress

Nadezhda Mikhaylovna Medvedeva (Russian: Надежда Михайловна Медведева, 6 October 1832, Moscow, Imperial Russia,—24 September 1899, Corfu, Greece) was a Russian stage actress associated with the Maly Theatre in Moscow.

== Life ==
A daughter of the actress Akulina Medvedeva (1796-1895) and one of Mikhail Shchepkin's students, Nadezhda Medvedeva made her successful debut on stage at age 14 as Agnesa in Moliere's L'École des femmes but for a while remained shadowed by stars like Lyubov Nikulina-Kositskaya, Ekaterina Vasilyeva and Nadezhda Rykalova. In 1854, after a two-year stint at the Odessa Theatre she returned to become Maly's leading actress but made her breakthrough later in the plays by Alexander Ostrovsky who wrote several parts (like that of Gurmyzhskaya in The Forest) especially for her.

Medvedeva trained a young Maria Yermolova, while Konstantin Stanislavski drew inspiration from her performances at the Maly at the beginning of his career, describing her as his "teacher."
