= The Forest (play) =

Play by Alexander Ostrovsky

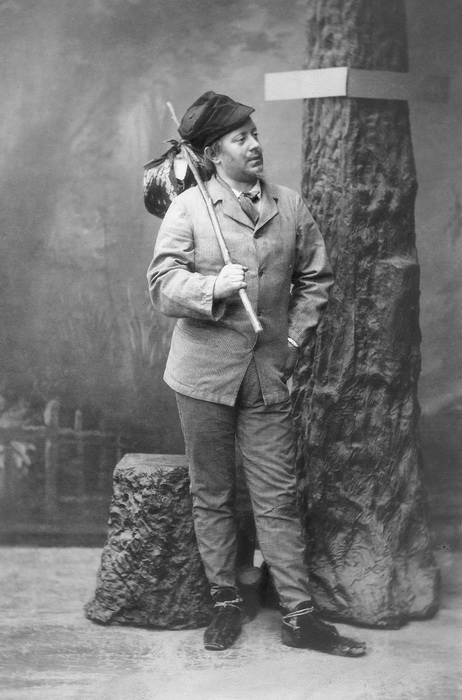
- Nikolai Yakovlev as Schastlivtsev; Maly Theatre, 1898
- Original language: Russian
- Written by: Aleksander Ostrovsky
- Genre: Social comedy

Premiere
- Date: 1 November 1871
- Place: Alexandrinsky Theatre in Saint Petersburg

The Forest (Russian: Лес, romanized: Les) is a play by Alexander Ostrovsky written in 1870 and first published in the January 1871 issue of Otechestvennye Zapiski magazine. It was premiered at Saint Petersburg's Alexandrinsky Theatre on 1 November 1871, as a benefit for actor Fyodor Burdin. In Moscow's Maly Theatre it was performed on November 26, 1871.

== History ==
Ostrovsky started writing The Forest in the last days of summer 1870 in his Shchelykovo estate. Initially it was supposed to be a family comedy but gradually the satirical line in it strengthened with Nestchastlivtsev, originally a marginal character, becoming the main hero.

The play's first informal public reading took place at the house of Alexander's brother, Mikhail Ostrovsky. Following the latter's advice, soon after the publication of the play, Ostrovsky nominated it for the prestigious Uvarov Prize but hasn't got it. The jury's decision has been criticized by Pavel Annenkov who wrote: "Alexander Nikolayevich has been refused the Prize. Such was the decision of those walking suitcases stuffed with quasi-scientific nonsense who sit in the [Academy's] Department of the Russian literature, having... not a drop of taste or poetical feeling; not a trace of understanding what mastery is in literature," he wrote to Mikhail Ostrovsky.

On 14 May 1871 the play received the censors' permission at the Theatre and Literature committee. It was premiered in Saint Petersburg's Alexandrinsky Theatre as a benefit for Fyodor Burdin who played Neschastlivtsev. It also featured Maria Tchitau (as Gurmyzhskaya), Yelena Struyskaya (Aksyusha) and Platon Pronsky (Milonov). Ostrovsky, who was not in a position to control the artistic process personally, has been trying to do it by means of letters, addressed to Burdin. After the premiere, the latter informed the author that the "play has been received very warmly" but opined that his presence would have done well to improve the quality of the production. What happened in reality was, the play flopped, due, mostly to Burdin's inadequacy who, according to one reviewer, "[had] not a modicum of a tragic actor in him." Tchitau's performance (as Gurmyzhskaya) was found wanting too, while the performances by Zubrov (as Schastlivtsev) and Vasilyev the 2nd (as Vosmibratov) were reviewed positively.

In Moscow, The Forest was performed on 26 November 1871, as a benefit for Sofia Akimova, who played Ulita. It also featured Nadezhda Medvedeva (Gurmyzhskaya), Glikeriya Fedotova (Aksyusha), Ivan Samarin (Milonov), Vasily Zhivokini (Bodayev), Prov Sadovsky (Vosmibratov, Neschastlivstev), Sergey Shumsky (Schastivtsev).

== Critical reception ==
Critics of the conservative camp reviewed the play negatively. Viktor Burenin saw The Forest as having no relevance whatsoever, arguing that it was lacking any serious content and was built upon the accidental sets of events and characters. Nikolai Strakhov, a Slavophile critic, expressed similar reservations, seeing the play as having no social significance and criticizing its humour as "Shchedrinian" and a "low-brow" type.

The Forest was praised by Nikolai Nekrasov (who called it 'brilliant') and Ivan Turgenev, who told Ostrovsky in a letter that he thought the character of Neschastlivtsev was one of the author's best creations ever. Aleksey Pleshcheev, reviewing the Moscow Artist Club's production of The Forest, expressed indignation at the fact that such a masterpiece has been so poorly treated by the Russian Imperial Theatres. One of the play's admirers was the actor Prov Sadovsky who's made a personal request for his son Mikhail to appear as Bulanov, as gymnasium student, which the latter did at the Moscow premier, on 26 November 1871.

== See also ==
- Vsevolod Meyerhold State Theatre
