= Aleksandra Yablochkina =

Actress

Aleksandra Aleksandrovna Yablochkina
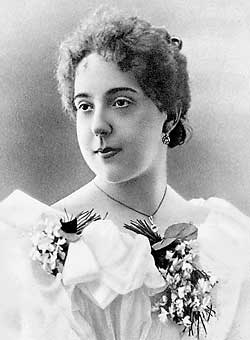
- Born: November 3, 1866; St. Petersburg, Russian Empire
- Died: March 20, 1964 (aged 97); Moscow, Soviet Union
- Years active: 1885–1961
- Awards: People's Artist of the USSR (1937); USSR State Prize (1943); Order of Lenin

Aleksandra Aleksandrovna Yablochkina (Александра Александровна Яблочкина; November 3, 1866 - March 20, 1964) was a leading actress of the Maly Theatre in Moscow for more than 75 years. She studied acting under her father before joining the Korsh Theatre troupe in 1886. Two years later, she moved to the Maly, where she worked with Maria Yermolova and Alexander Yuzhin. Yablochkina specialized in comedy roles and was renowned for the purity of her enunciation. In 1915, she was selected to lead the Russian theatrical society. In 1937, she became one of the first individuals to be awarded the title of People's Artist of the USSR. In 1943, she was awarded the USSR State Prize. She wrote two volumes of memoirs, My Life in Theatre (1953) and 75 Years in Theatre (1960).

== Honors ==
- The Central House of Actors in Moscow bears Yablochkina's name.
- Yablochkina crater on Venus was named after her in 1985.
