= Ivan Samarin =

Ivan Samarin may refer to:

- Ivan Samarin (racing driver) (born 1988), Russian racing driver
- Ivan Samarin (actor) (1817–1885), Russian stage actor, theatre director and playwright
