= Elmira Ismayılova =

Azerbaijani actress (born 1945)

- Born: 13 November 1945 (age 80); Yerevan, Armenian SSR, Soviet Union
- Citizenship: Soviet Union; Republic of Azerbaijan
- Occupation: Actress

Elmira Ismayılova (Azerbaijani:Elmira Məhərrəm qızı İsmayılova; b. Yerevan, Armenian SSR) is an Azerbaijani actress and People's Artist of Azerbaijan (2007).

== Life ==
Ismayilova was born in Yerevan in 1945. In 1968, she graduated from Armenian State Pedagogical University and began to work in the Yerevan State Azerbaijani Dramatic Theater.

Her roles include Humay (Sabit Rahman, "Aliqulu is Getting Married"), Afat (M. Shamkhalov, "Mother-in-law"), Countess (William Shakespeare, "All's Well That Ends Well"), Dilara (Anar, "City's Summer Days"), Mrs. Dilbar (Najaf bey Vazirov, "Haji Qamber"), Oqudalova (A. Ostrovsky, "Without a Dowry"), Smeraldina (Carlo Goldoni, "The Servant of Two Masters"), Böyükxanım (J. Jabbarli, "Aydin"), Xala (Uzeyir Hajibeyov, "Arshin Mal Alan"), Nazik (S. Rahman, "Star"), and others. Ismayilova has also appeared in television films such as "A Night Longer Than Life" and "The Song of Twins".

== Family ==
Her husband, Vidadi Aliyev, was also an actor and People's Artist of Azerbaijan.

== Awards ==
- Order of Honor of the Supreme Soviet of the Azerbaijan SSR — 24.11.1978
- Merited Artist of Azerbaijan — 25.10.2000
- People's Artist of Azerbaijan — 16.10.2007
- Award of the President of the Republic of Azerbaijan — 2006, 2007, 2008
- "Artist" medal (Medal of the Union of Theater Workers of Azerbaijan) — 2021
