= The Fruits of Enlightenment =

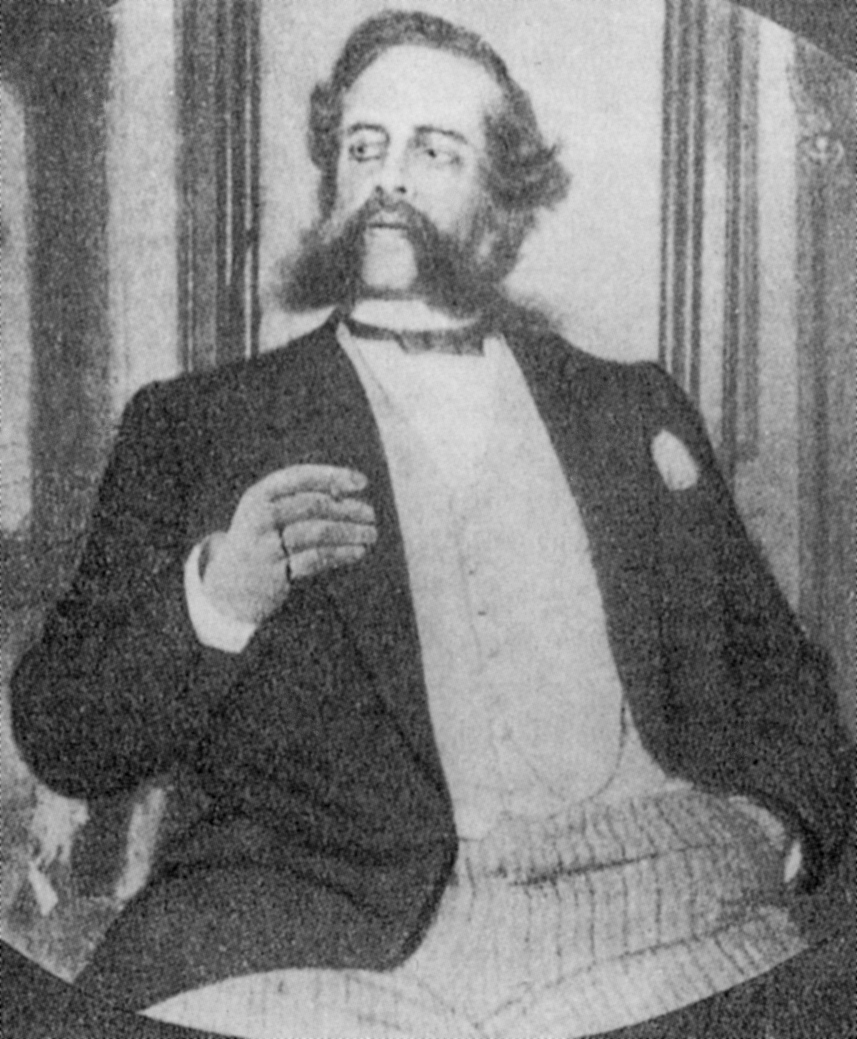
- Konstantin Stanislavski as Zvezdintsev in The Moscow Society of Art and Literature's production in 1891.
- Original language: Russian
- Written by: Leo Tolstoy
- Genre: Realism

Premiere
- Date: 30 December 1889

The Fruits of Enlightenment, a.k.a. Fruits of Culture, (1889–90, pub. 1891) is a play by Russian writer Leo Tolstoy satirizing the persistence of unenlightened attitudes towards the peasants amongst the Russian landed aristocracy. In 1891, Konstantin Stanislavski achieved success directing the play for his Society of Art and Literature, the first of several increasingly sophisticated Moscow performances.

== History ==
Tolstoy created the first draft of the play in 1886, along with The Power of Darkness, but it was incomplete. Three years later, his children and wife persuaded him to complete the manuscript sufficiently for a house performance in Yasnaya Polyana, Tolstoy's home near Tula. Tolstoy initially resisted but quickly took the lead in directing the amateur actors; the cast included four of his children, two nieces, a court prosecutor from Tula, and a judge from Moscow. According to the author's eldest son, Sergei Tolstoy, this version, first performed on 30 December 1889, deliberately reflected the contemporaneous realities of Yasnaya Polyana and the neighboring country estates, even using the real names of Tula gentry for the stage characters (these names were replaced with purely fictitious ones later). The first performance washed out the border between imaginary characters and the real personalities playing them, removing the fourth wall between actors and the audience; it has never been reproduced in this form. The audience received the play well, and it was reproduced by Tula amateurs, including Tatyana Tolstaya, in April 1890, with the proceeds donated to a local orphanage. The second performance was attended by Maly theatre actor Alexander Yuzhin and independent theatre director Vladimir Nemirovich-Danchenko.

In 1891, Konstantin Stanislavski directed the first public performance in Moscow for his amateur Society of Art and Literature in its theatre on Tverskaya Street. This production starred Vera Komissarzhevskaya, Maria Lilina (Stanislavski's wife), Vasily Luzhsky, and Stanislavski himself as Zvezdintsev. The first professional performance was staged in Saint Petersburg's Alexandrinsky Theatre in September 1891. The leading role of Zvezdintsev was offered to Vladimir Davydov, who declined the honour and chose the lesser role of third peasant; the second peasant wore makeup to resemble Leo Tolstoy himself, and the first peasant's makeup was designed by Ilya Repin. The show was a success and premiered in Moscow's Maly Theatre in December 1891. Tolstoy attended Maly Theatre production in January 1892 and left dissatisfied with the artists' rendition of the three peasants. The play has remained in Russian and Soviet theatre repertory ever since.

== Sources ==
- Banham, Martin, ed. 1998. The Cambridge Guide to Theatre. Cambridge: Cambridge University Press. ISBN 0-521-43437-8.
- Magarshack, David. 1950. Stanislavsky: A Life. London and Boston: Faber, 1986. ISBN 0-571-13791-1.
- Gritsenko, I. P. "Traditsii lyubitelskogo teatra v semye Tolstogo (Традиции любительского театра в семье Л.Н. Толстого)" (in Russian).
- Rybkova, Yulia (1982). "Comments to the Fruits of Enlightenment" (in Russian). In the 11th volume of the 22-volume set of Leo Tolstoy works.
