= Yablochkina (crater) =

Crater on Venus

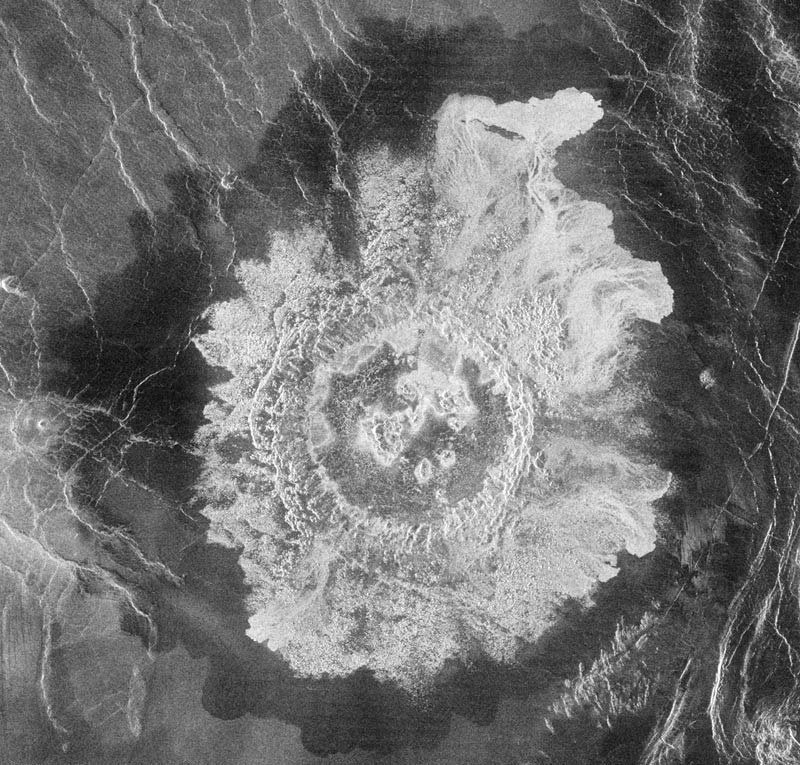
- Magellan radar image of Yablochkina
- Location: Venus
- Coordinates: 48.3°N 195.3°E
- Diameter: 64.3 km (40.0 mi)
- Eponym: Aleksandra Yablochkina

Yablochkina is an impact crater on the surface of Venus. It was named in 1985 after Soviet actress Aleksandra Yablochkina.

Yablochkina has a peak ring, outflow deposits, and a radar-dark halo. It has a continuous ejecta radius of 42.4 km, and a wall width of 10.1 km.

== Surroundings ==
Yablochkina is neighboring the crater Raymonde, along with Ahsonnutli Dorsa, Izumi Patera, and Nemesis Tesserae.
