= Mikhail Shchepkin =

Russian actor (1788–1863)

Mikhail Shchepkin Михаил Щепкин
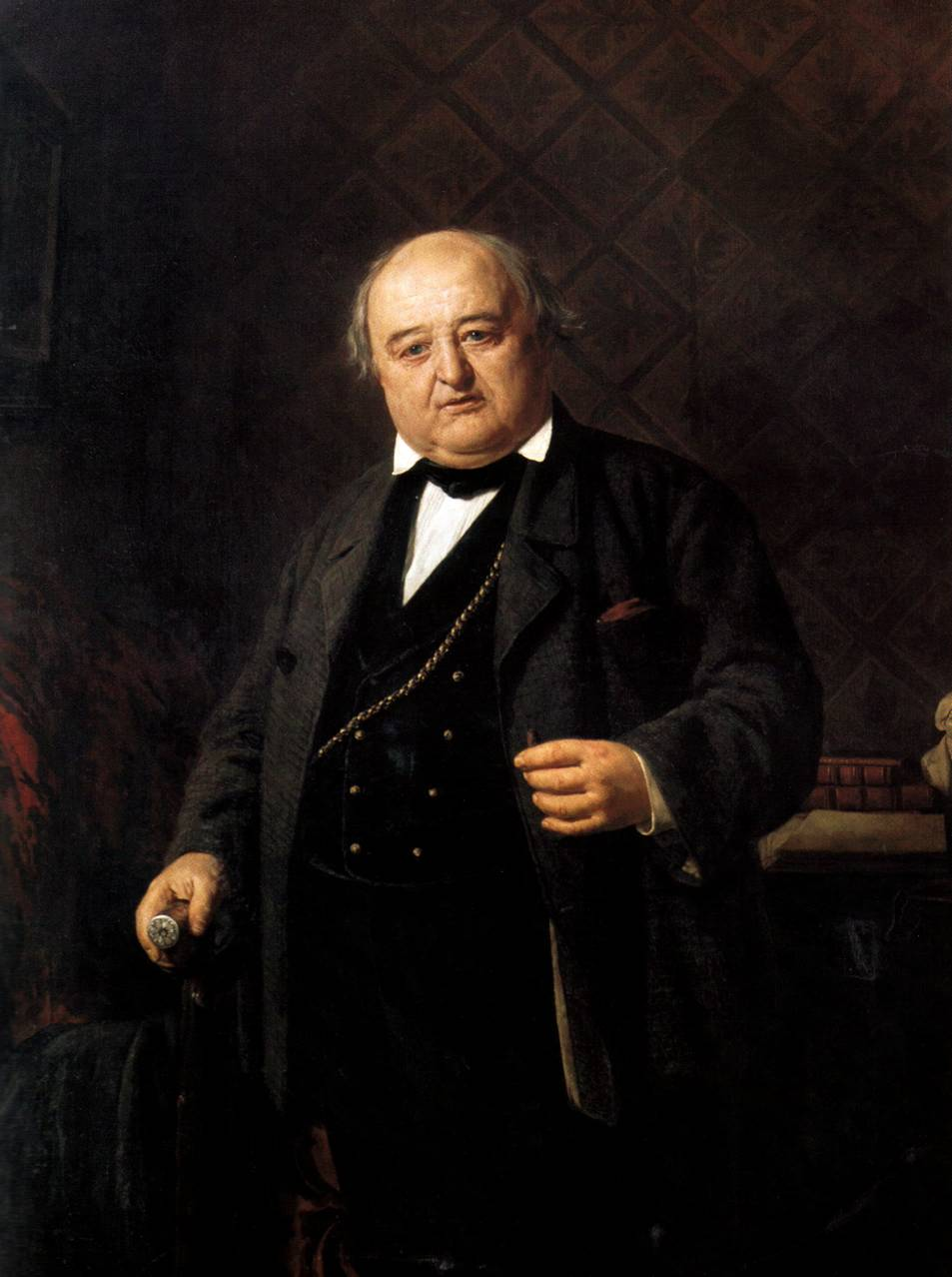
- Portrait by Nikolai Nevrev, 1862
- Born: 17 November [O.S. 6 November] 1788; Krasnoye, Kursk Governorate, Russia
- Died: 11 August [O.S. 30 July] 1863 (aged 74); Yalta, Russia
- Occupation: Actor
- Writing career
- Language: Russian
- Years active: 1805—1863
- Period: 19th-century theatre
- Notable work: Memoirs
- Movement: Realism

Mikhail Semyonovich Shchepkin (Russian: Михаи́л Семёнович Ще́пкин; 17 November [O.S. 6 November] 1788 — 11 August [O.S. 30 July] 1863) was a Russian actor. He is considered to be the most prominent Russian actor of the 19th century and the "father" of realist acting in Russia and, via the influence of his student, Glikeriya Fedotova, a major influence on the development of the 'system' of Konstantin Stanislavski. Shchepkin's significance to the Theatre of Russia is comparable to that of David Garrick to the English theatre.

He distinguished between two kinds of actors, both of whom are dedicated to the art of acting: those who have developed the art of pretense based on intelligence and reason; and those who express feelings experienced by the actor in performance and work based on "a flaming-soul, heavenly spark." Shchepkin considered the effect of the latter approach superior to that of the former. He was opposed to the principles advanced by the French playwright and philosopher Denis Diderot in his Paradox of the Actor (published posthumously in 1830), which inverted Shchepkin's evaluation.

== Life ==
Shchepkin was born in the village of Krasnoye, Kursk Governorate, to a serf family owned by Count G. S. Volkenshtein. Shchepkin's freedom had to be bought by his admirers in 1821. Three years later, he joined the Maly Theatre in Moscow, which he would dominate for the next 40 years—it became known as the 'House of Shchepkin'. Shchepkin was the first to play Famusov in the Woe from Wit (1831) and the Mayor in The Government Inspector (1836). His acting was acclaimed by Alexander Pushkin, Nikolai Gogol, Alexander Herzen, and Ivan Turgenev for its subtlety, with much attention given to realistic detail and understatement.

== Acting philosophy ==
Shchepkin argued that an actor ought to get into the skin of a character, identify with their thoughts and feelings, observe life, and have knowledge of their nature, which provides the source for an actor's work. In 1848 he wrote:

It is so much easier to play mechanically—for that, you only need your reason. Reason will approximate to joy and sorrow just as an imitation approximates to nature. But an actor of feeling—that's quite different. [...] He just begins by wiping out his self [...] and becomes the character the author intended him to be. He must walk, talk, think, feel, cry, and laugh as the author wants him to. You see how his efforts become more meaningful. In the first case, you need only pretend to live—in the second you have to live.

Shchepkin's distinction between the 'actor of reason' and the 'actor of feeling' influenced the formation of the ideas about acting contained in the 'system' devised by Konstantin Stanislavski.

== Family ==
In 1812, Shchepkin married Elena Dmitrievna ("Alyosha") who was a Turkish captive during the Siege of Anapa. They had five children, including the philologist Dmitry Mikhailovich Schepkin; the publisher and teacher Nikolai Mikhailovich Schepkin; the lawyer Petr Mikhailovich; and the actresses Fyokla (Faina) Mikhailovna and Alexandra Mikhailovna.

== See also ==
- Tatiana Shchepkina-Kupernik, his granddaughter

== Bibliography ==
- "Щепкин, Михаил Семенович" . Brockhaus and Efron Encyclopedic Dictionary (in Russian). 1906.
- Banham, Martin, ed. 1998. The Cambridge Guide to Theatre. Cambridge: Cambridge UP. ISBN 0-521-43437-8.
- Benedetti, Jean. 1999. Stanislavski: His Life and Art. Revised edition. Original edition published in 1988. London: Methuen. ISBN 0-413-52520-1.
- Benedetti, Jean. 2005. The Art of the Actor: The Essential History of Acting, From Classical Times to the Present Day. London: Methuen. ISBN 0-413-77336-1.
- Carlson, Marvin. 1993. Theories of the Theatre: A Historical and Critical Survey from the Greeks to the Present. Expanded ed. Ithaca and London: Cornell University Press. ISBN 978-0801481543.
- Golub, Spencer. 1998b. "Shchepkin, Mikhail (Semyonovich)". In Banham (1998, 985-986).
- Senelick, Laurence. 1984. Serf Actor: The Life and Art of Mikhail Shchepkin. Westport, Conn.: Greenwood Press. ISBN 0-313-22494-3.
