= Pavel Mochalov =

Russian actor

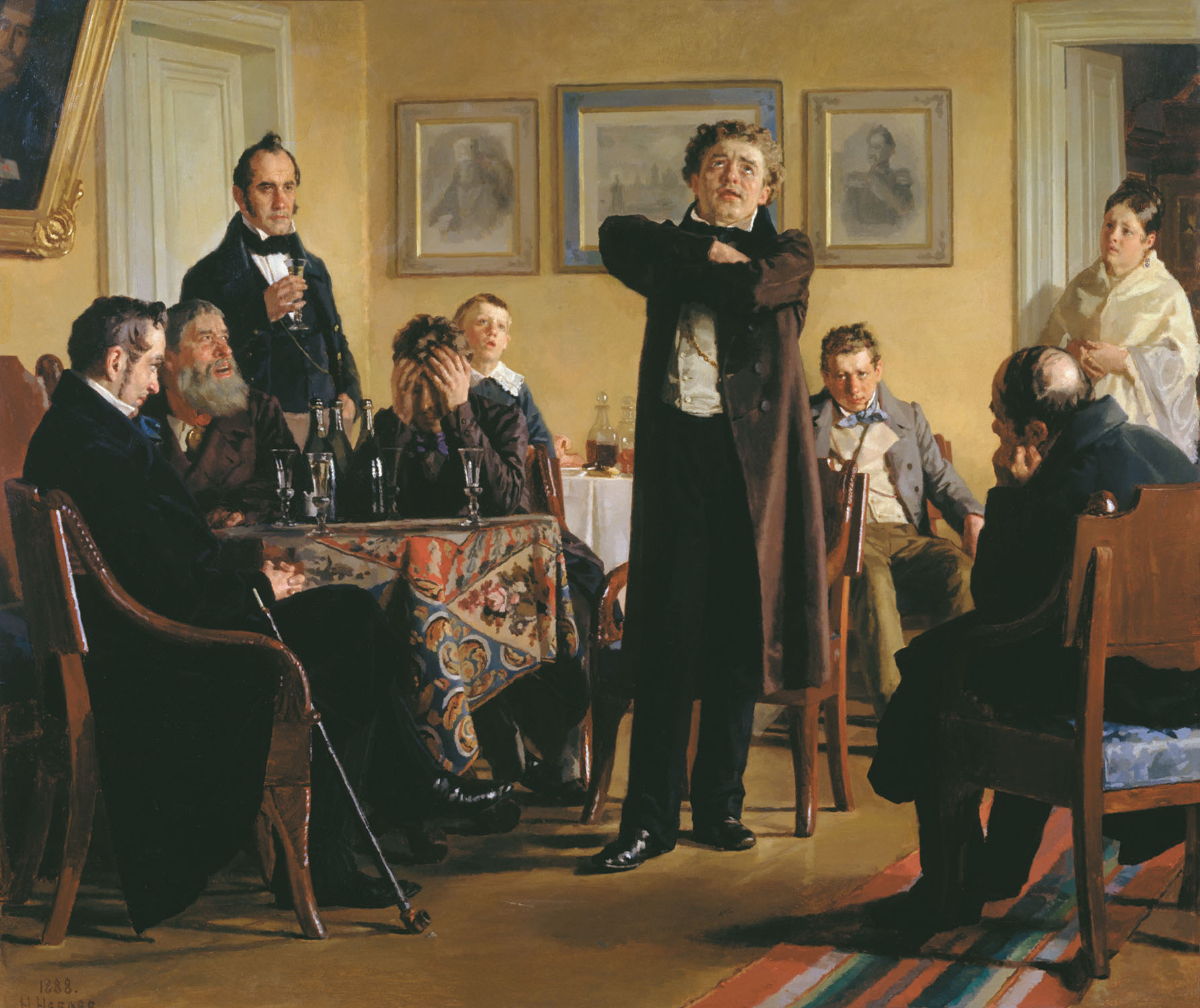
Pavel Mochalov among his admirers by Nikolai Nevrev.

Pavel Stepanovich Mochalov (Russian: Павел Степанович Мочалов; 1800 – 1848) was thought to be the greatest tragedian of Russian Romanticism, much admired by Alexander Herzen, Mikhail Lermontov and other contemporaries.

During his prolonged career at the Malyi Theatre of Moscow, Mochalov gave inspired although uneven performances in melodrama and neoclassical tragedy, as well as Shakespearean works. He excelled in plays by Friedrich Schiller, in the title role of Don Carlos, as both Karl Moor and Franz Moor in The Robbers, and as Mortimer in Maria Stuart; and in title roles in Shakespeare's plays as Hamlet, Othello, King Lear, and Richard III. His acting had a Byronic flavour and relied heavily upon inspiration.

Sometimes styled the "Russian Kean", Mochalov was frequently compared with his St Petersburg rival, Vasily Karatygin, whose acting was more poised and calculated.
