= Nikolai Nevrev =

Russian painter (1830–1904)

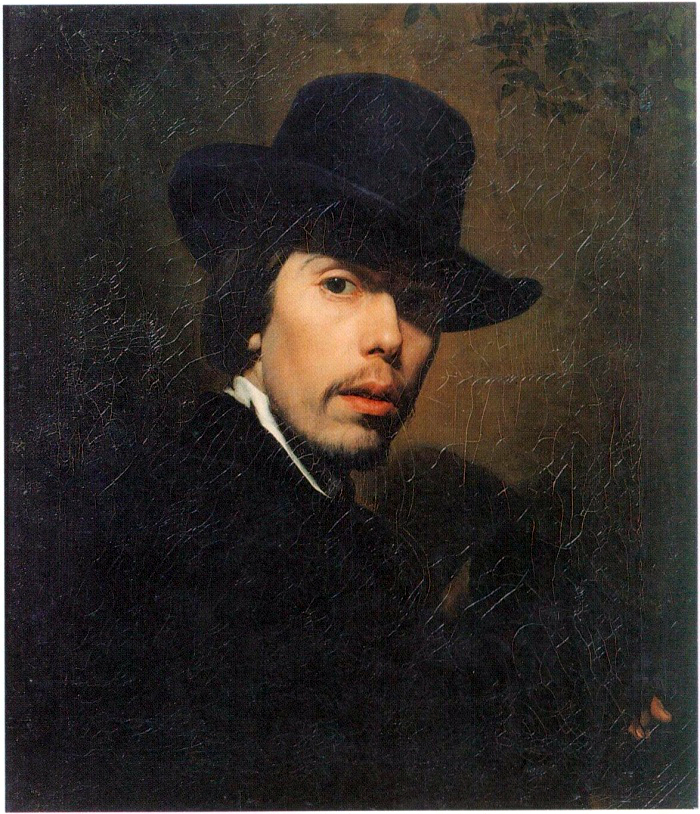
Self-portrait (1858)

Nikolai Vasilyevich Nevrev (Russian: Никола́й Васи́льевич Не́врев; 1830 in Moscow – 3 May 1904 in Mogilev Governorate) was a Russian painter who specialized in genre and historical scenes.

== Life ==
Nevrev was born to a family of merchants. His first art lessons came from his stepfather, who was a drawing teacher. At the age of 21, Nevrev entered the Moscow School of Painting, Sculpture and Architecture (MSPSA), where he studied under the Russian-Italian painter, Mikhail Scotti. Upon graduating in 1855, he was named a "Free Artist". In the 1860s, Nevrev painted one of his masterpieces, "The Bargain" (1866), in which he depicted the sale of a serf. Some other paintings focused on criticisms of the Church.

He temporarily stopped working in the 1870s, for unknown reasons, but began painting historical art in the 1880s. In 1881, he became a member of the Association of Travelling Art Exhibitions. His best work during this time were his genre paintings, each exhibiting a human moral. From 1887 to 1890, he taught at the MSPSA and, in 1889, became curator at the Tretyakov Gallery.

In 1898, following the death of Pavel Tretyakov, he was offered the position of Director at the gallery, but declined, citing old age and poor health. At the age of 74, in great financial distress, he committed suicide by shooting himself at his estate near Mogilev.

On 25 September 1980, the Soviet Union issued a 6 kopek postage stamp commemorating the 150th anniversary of his birth (together with that of Konstantin Flavitsky).

An international open-air painting festival is held annually in his honor in the Mogilev Region of Belarus.

== Gallery ==
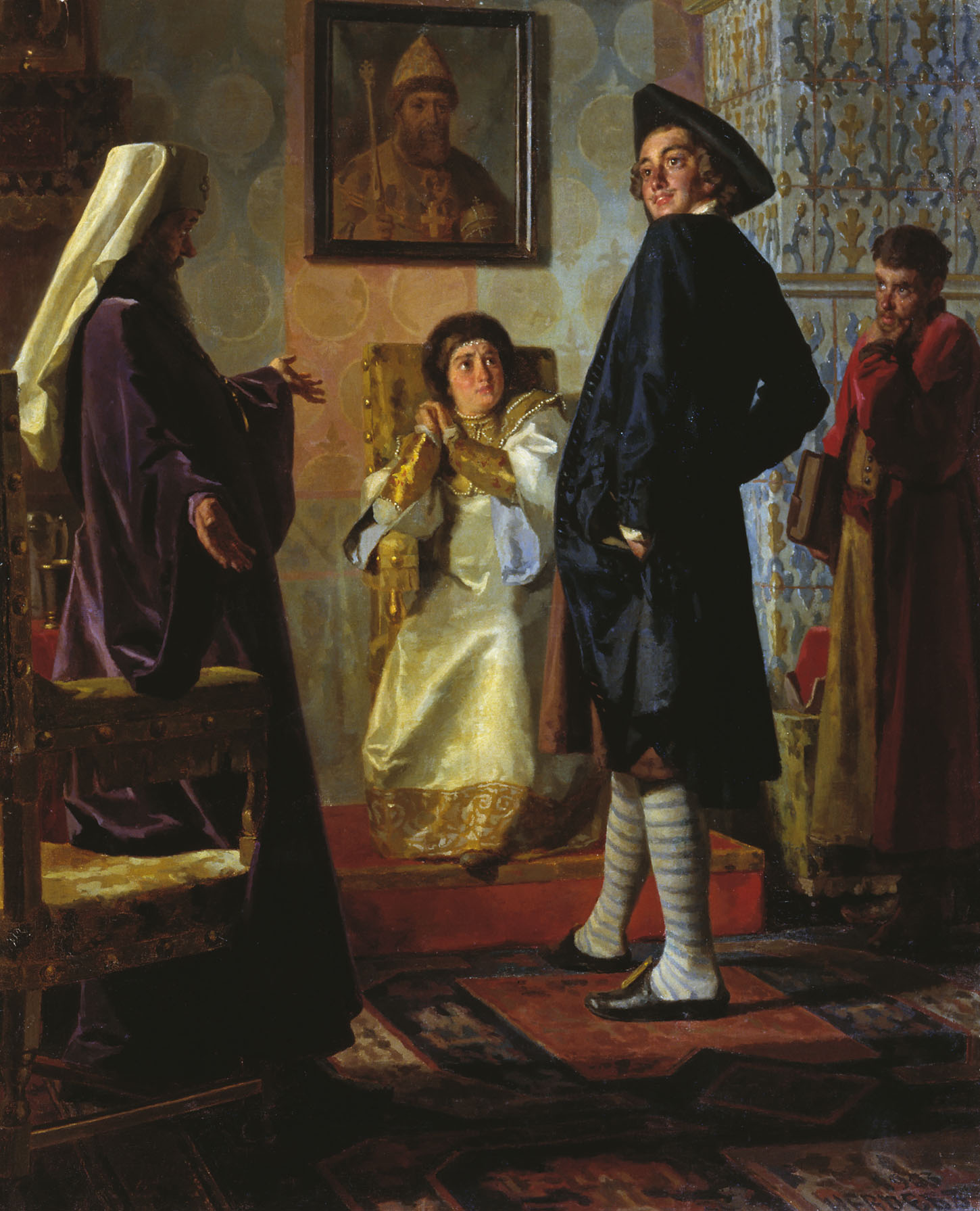
Peter I in a foreign outfit in front of his mother Natalya Naryshkina, Patriarch Adrian and Nikita Zotov (1903)

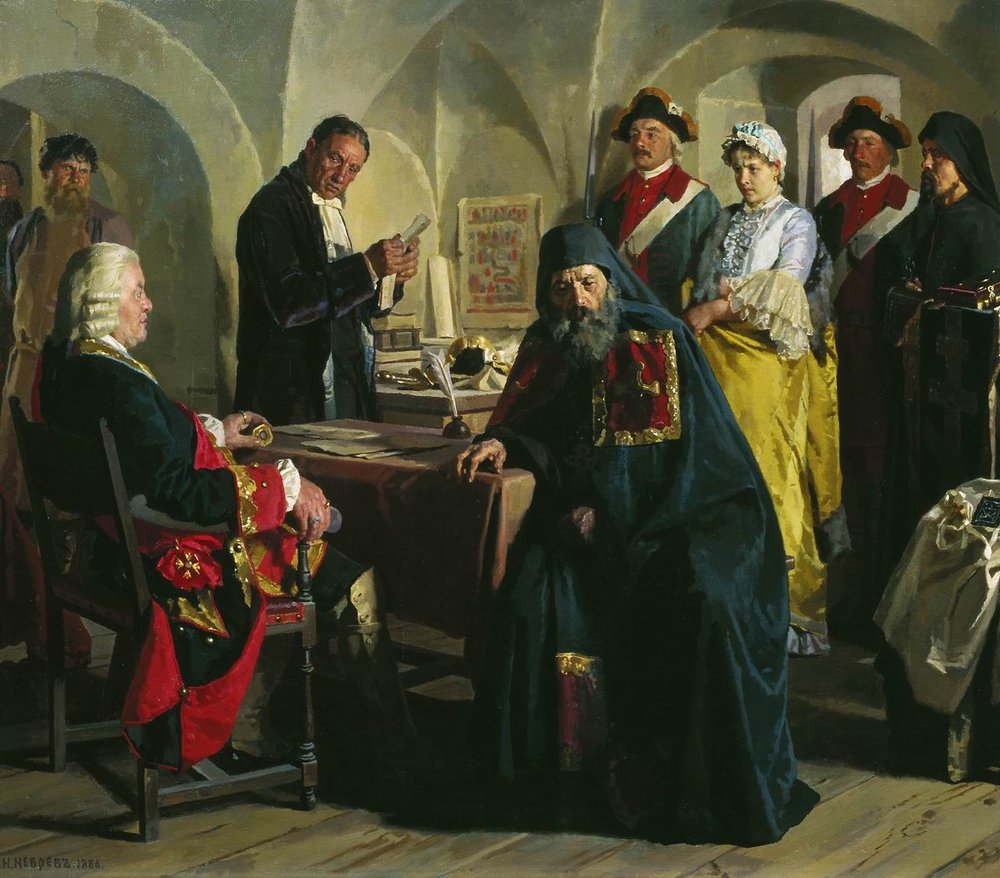
Princess Praskovya Yusupova before becoming a nun (1886)

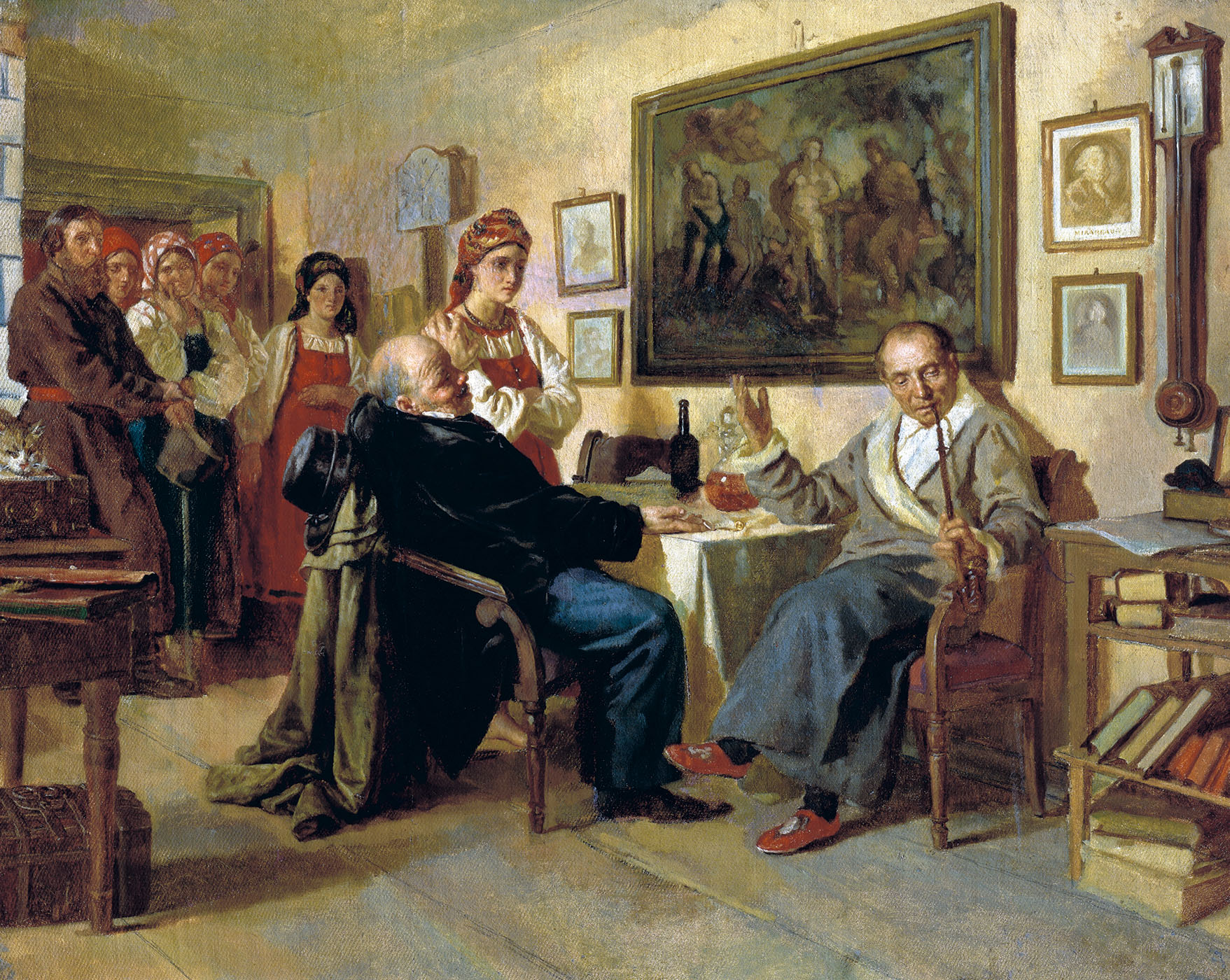
The Bargain (1866)

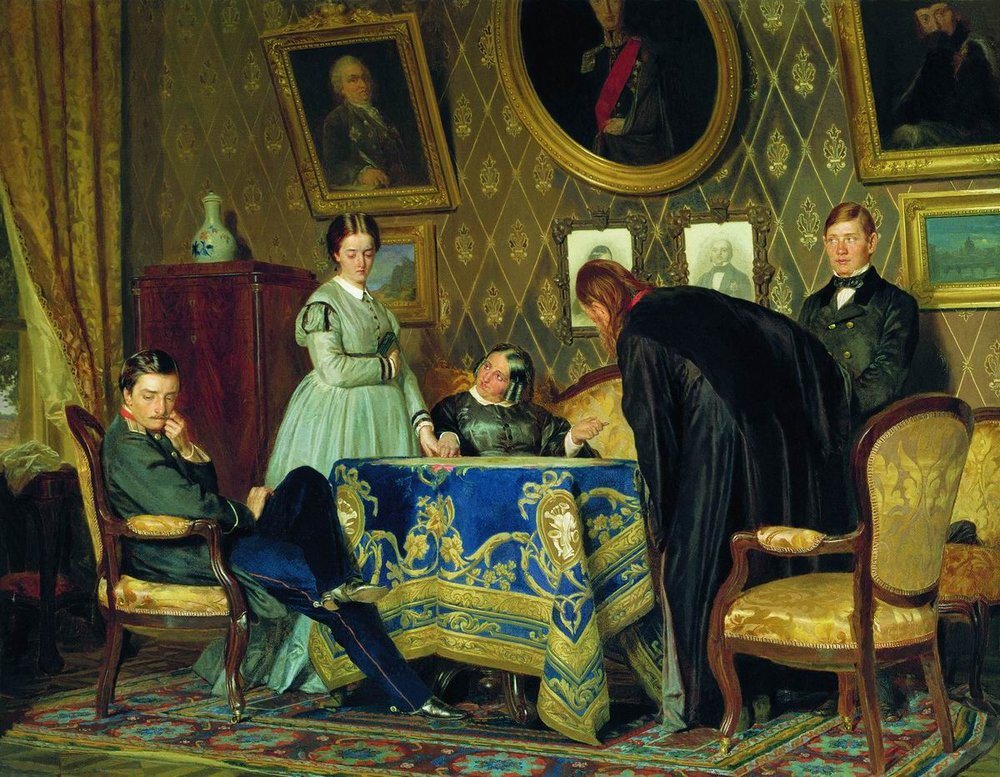
The Ward (1867)

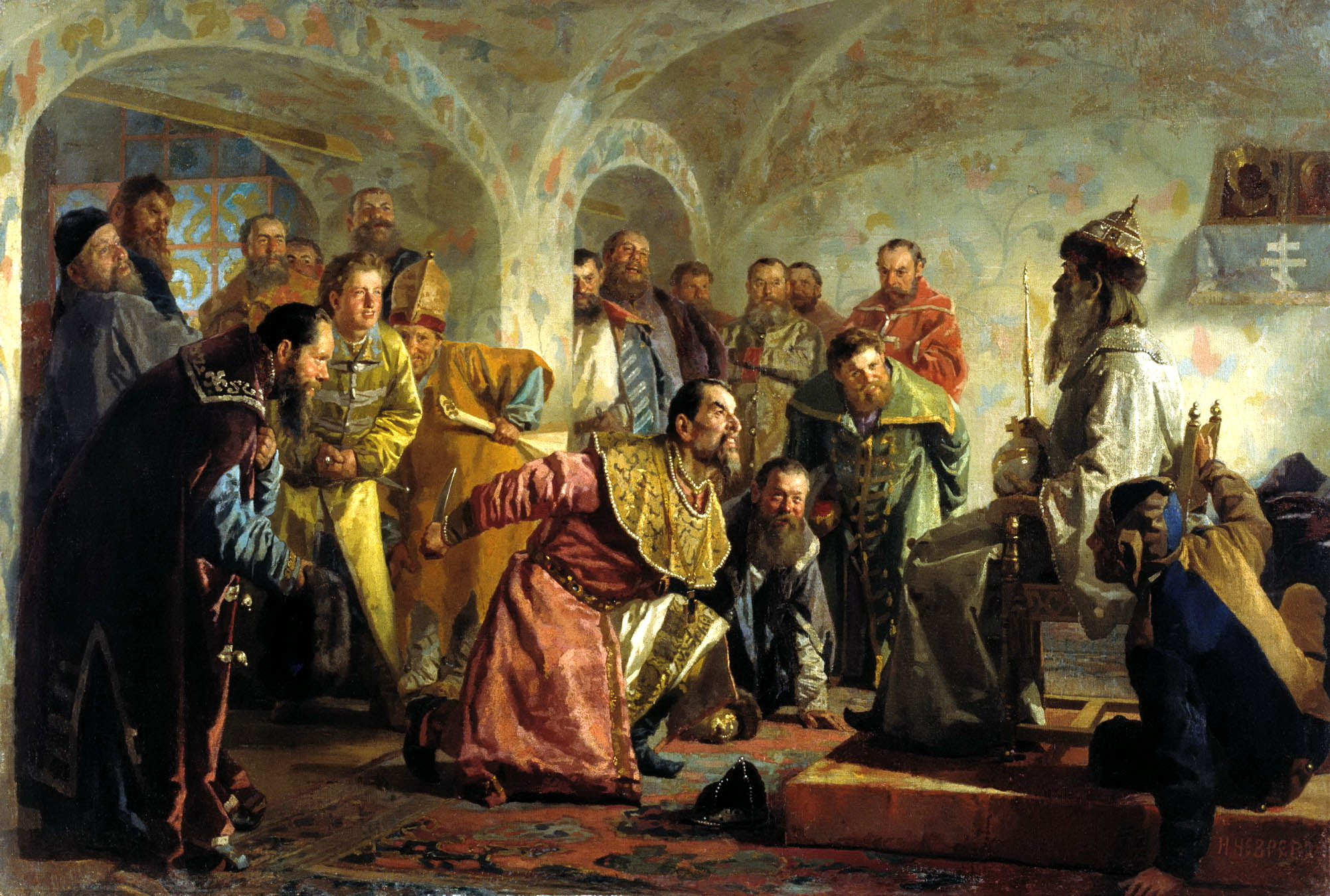
Oprichniki (1870s)

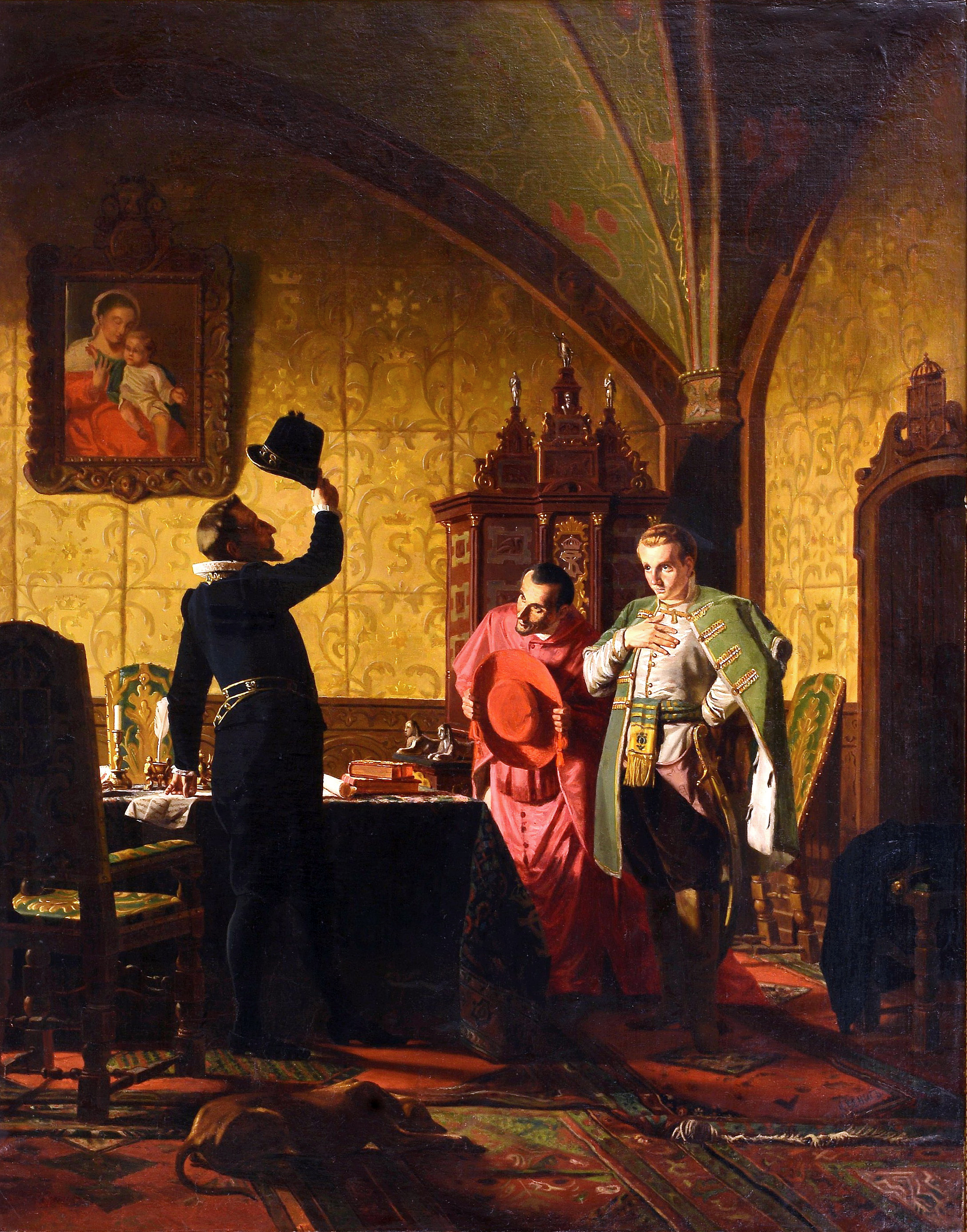
False Dmitry takes an oath of allegiance to king Sigismund III Vasa (1874)

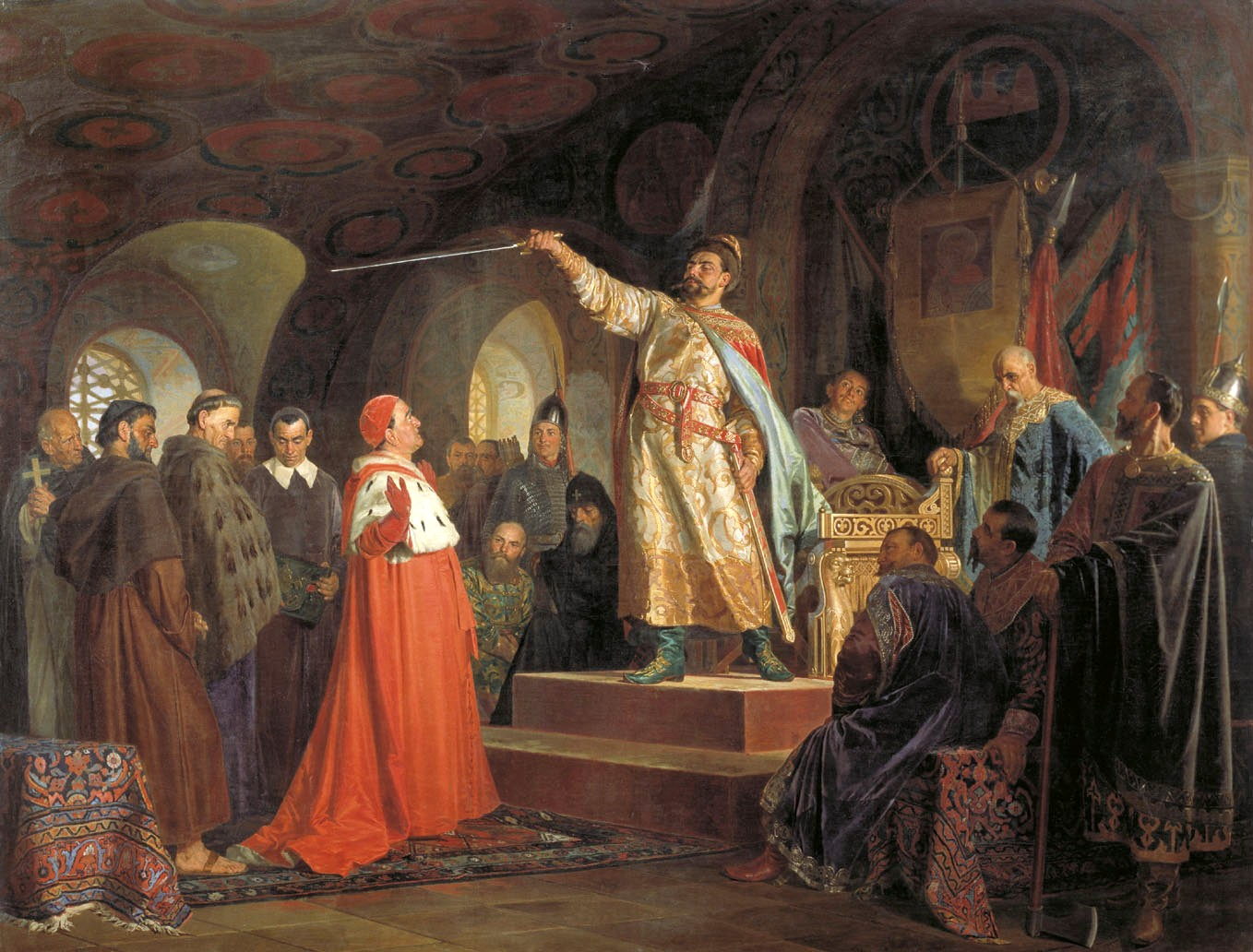
Roman of Halych receives an ambassador from Pope Innocent III (1875)

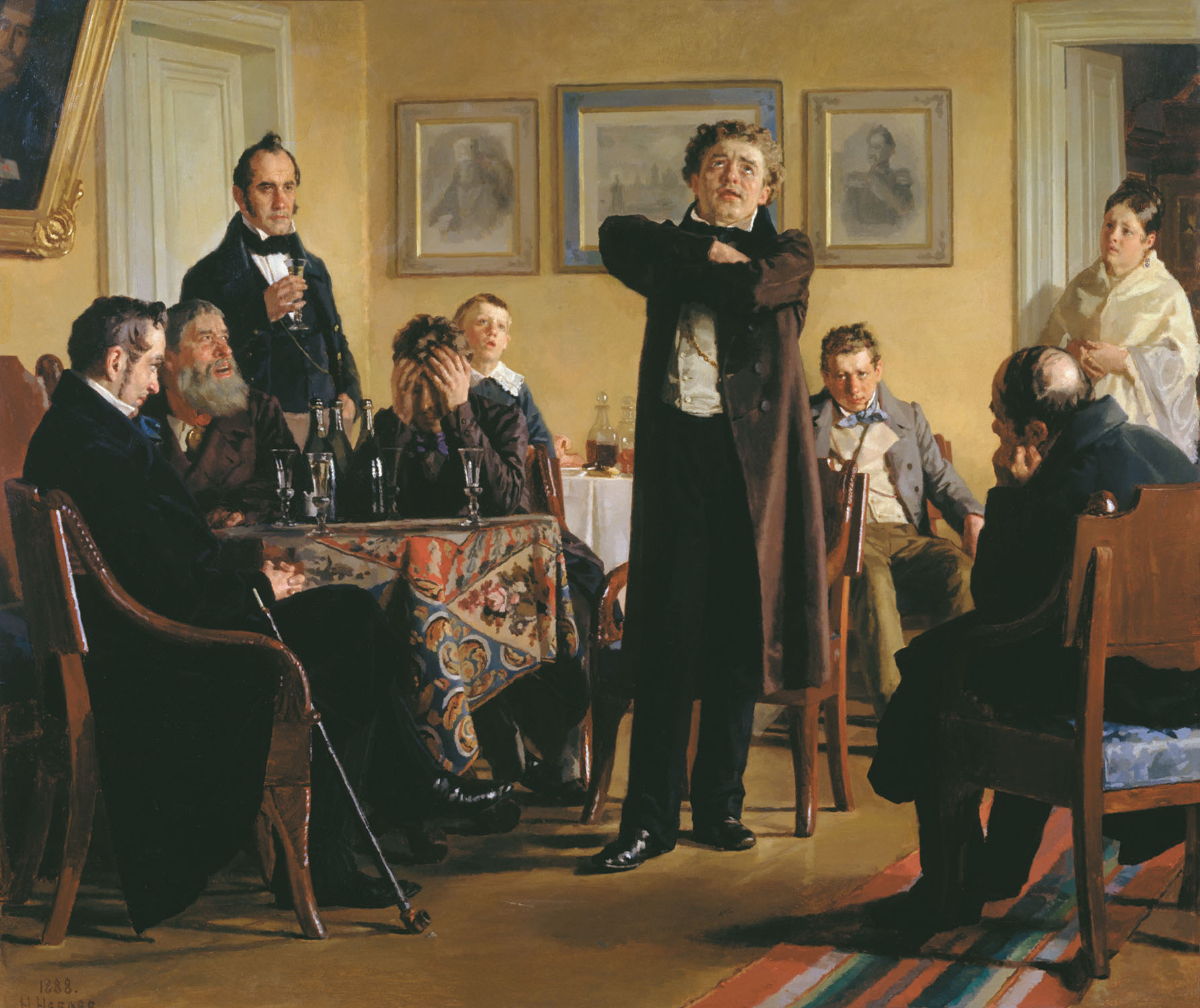
Pavel Mochalov among his admirers (1888)

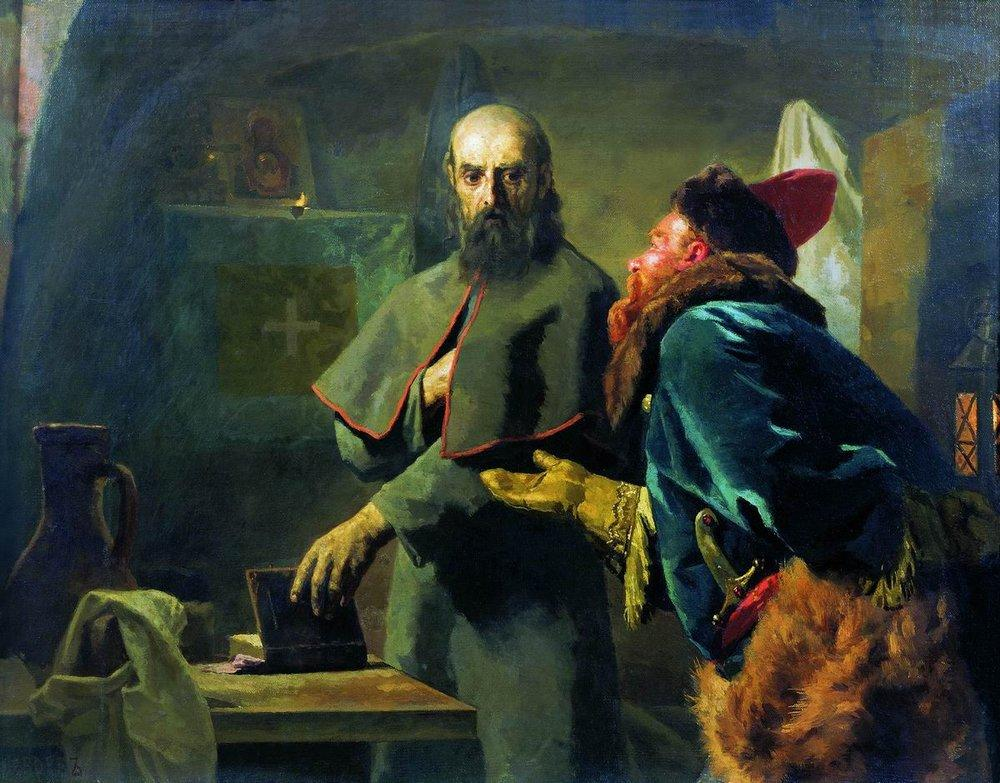
Malyuta Skuratov approaching Metropolitan Philip in order to kill him (1898)
