= Ivan Samarin (actor) =

Russian actor

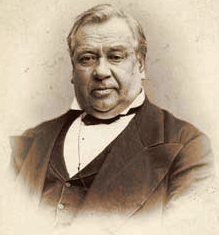
- Born: Иван Васильевич Самарин; 19 January 1817; Saint Petersburg, Russian Empire
- Died: 25 August 1885 (aged 68); Moscow, Russian Empire
- Occupations: actor, playwright

Ivan Vasilyevich Samarin (Russian: Иван Васильевич Самарин; 19 January 1817, in Saint Petersburg, Russian Empire – 1885 in Moscow, Russian Empire) was a Russian stage actor (later theatre director and playwright), associated with the Maly Theatre, who achieved his greatest success with the parts of Chatsky (from 1839 onwards) and later (starting from 1863) Famusov in Alexander Griboyedov's Woe from Wit, as well as Khlestakov in Gogol's Revizor. As a comic he excelled in several plays by William Shakespeare.

== Works ==
In 1862 Samarin started to teach drama at the Shchepkin Theatre Institute. Among his best-known students there were future stars Glikeriya Fedotova and Nadezhda Nikulina. In 1874 he became the head of the Drama department at the Moscow Conservatory.

Moved by Samarin's 1879 production of his Evgeny Onegin at the Maly Theatre, Tchaikovsky in 1884 wrote a piece for string orchestra called "Privet blagodarnosti" (Address of Gratitude) later to be known as the "Elegy for Ivan Samarin".

Samarin authored several plays, among them Utro vechera mudreneye (Tomorrow Is a New Day, 1864) and Samozvanets Luba (Luba the Impostor, 1868).

== Literature ==
- Рогачевский М. Иван Васильевич Самарин. — М. — Л., 1948. (Сomprehensive 1948 biography by M. Rogachevsky)
