= Aleksandr Lensky =

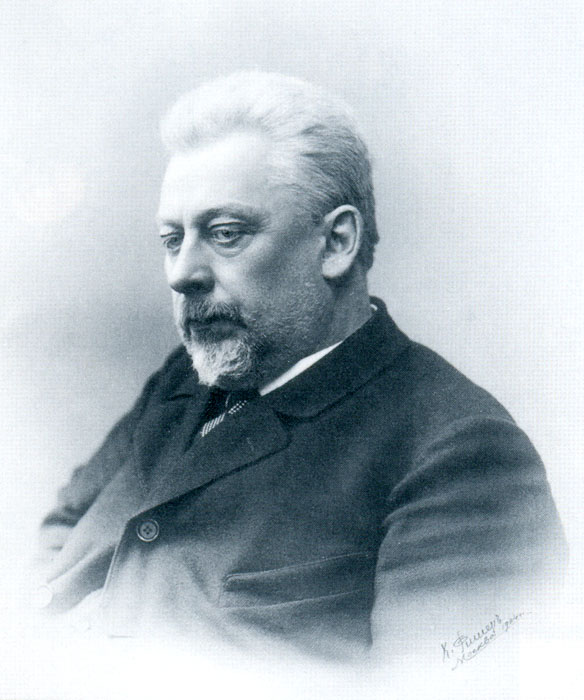
Lensky, 1908

Aleksandr Pavlovich Lensky (Russian Александр Павлович Ленский; 1 (13) October 1847 – 13 (25) October (Note: 26 October according to other reports) 1908) was a Russian actor, director and theatrical educator. He was born in Kishinev (now Chişinău, Moldova). He was an outstanding figure of theatre under the Russian Empire. He was the illegitimate son of Prince Pavel Gagarin and singer Olga Vervitsioti. He made his debut in 1865 in Vladimir at the theater under the direction of Alexandra Chitau-Ogarieva. Lensky died in Moscow and is buried in Kaniv.
