= Glikeriya Fedotova =

Russian actress (1846–1925)

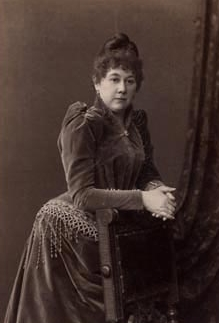
- Born: 22 May 1846; Oryol, Russia
- Died: 27 February 1925 (aged 78); Moscow, Soviet Union
- Occupation: Actress
- Employer: Maly Theatre

Glikeriya Nikolayevna Fedotova (Russian: Гликерия Николаевна Федотова; née Pozdnyakova [Позднякова]; 22 May [O.S. 10 May] 1846 – 27 February 1925) was a Russian actress associated with Moscow's Maly Theatre.

She was honoured with the titles of Meritorious Artist of the Imperial Theatres, People's Artist of the Republic (1924), and Hero of Labour (1924). She was also a personal friend and teacher of Konstantin Stanislavski.

== Career ==
Of the 29 parts Fedotova had in Alexander Ostrovsky's plays, at least two (Snegurochka, Vasilissa Melentyevna) have been written specifically for her by the author. The part of Katerina in The Storm was hers for 35 years, from 1863 onwards. In the 1880s, Stanislavski invited Fedotova to teach drama at the Art and Literature Society; the most famous of her students there was Alexandra Yablochkina.

== Personal life ==
She was married to the actor and theater director Aleksandr Fedotov.

== Sources ==
- "Федотова, Гликерия Николаевна" . Brockhaus and Efron Encyclopedic Dictionary (in Russian). 1906.
