= Alexander Yuzhin =

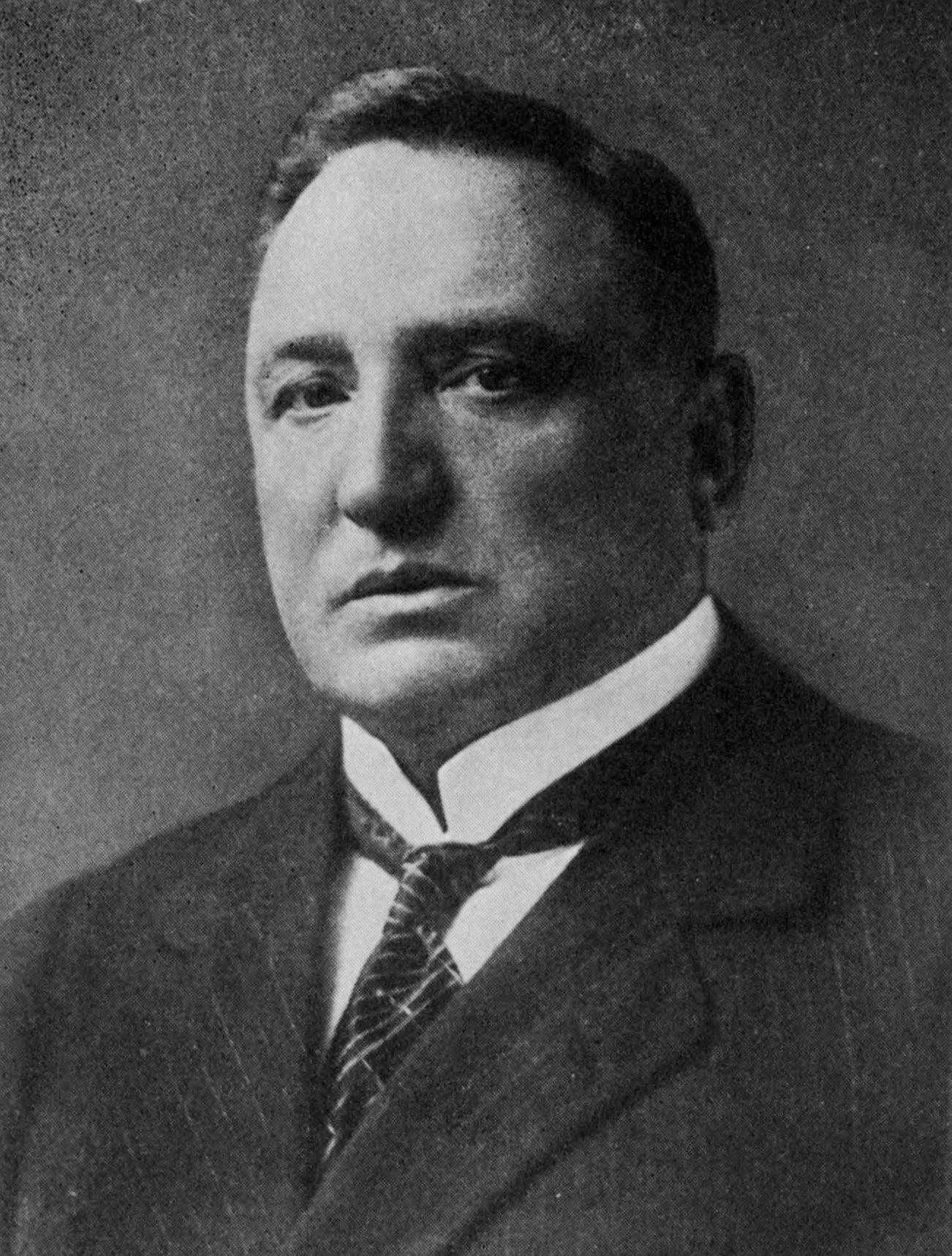
Alexander Yuzhin

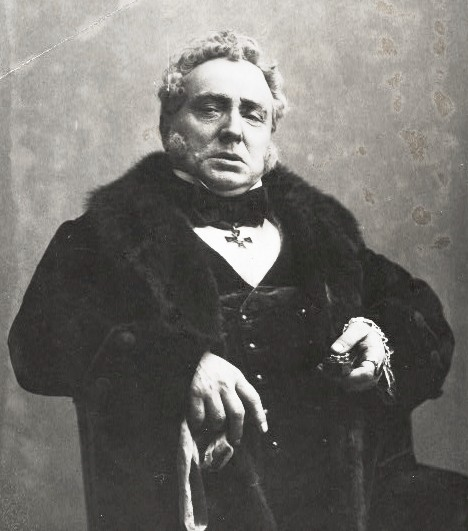
Alexander Yuzhin as Famusov in Woe from Wit by Aleksandr Griboyedov, Malyi Theatre, 1915

Alexander Ivanovich Yuzhin (Russian: Алекса́ндр Ива́нович Ю́жин. 1857–1927) was a stage name of the Georgian Prince Sumbatov (Sumbatashvili), who dominated the Malyi Theatre of Moscow at the turn of the 19th and 20th centuries. He was best known for the Romantic parts in the dramas by Schiller and Victor Hugo but also penned a number of plays himself. Yuzhin lived on to become one of the first People's Artists of the Republic in 1922.

He was a freemason. Initiated to February 17, 1908 in the masonic lodge "Renaissance" (Grand Orient of France).
