= Maly Theatre (Moscow) =

Theatre in Moscow, Russia first opened in 1806

- Малый театр
- Imperial Moscow Theatre; Императорский московский театр
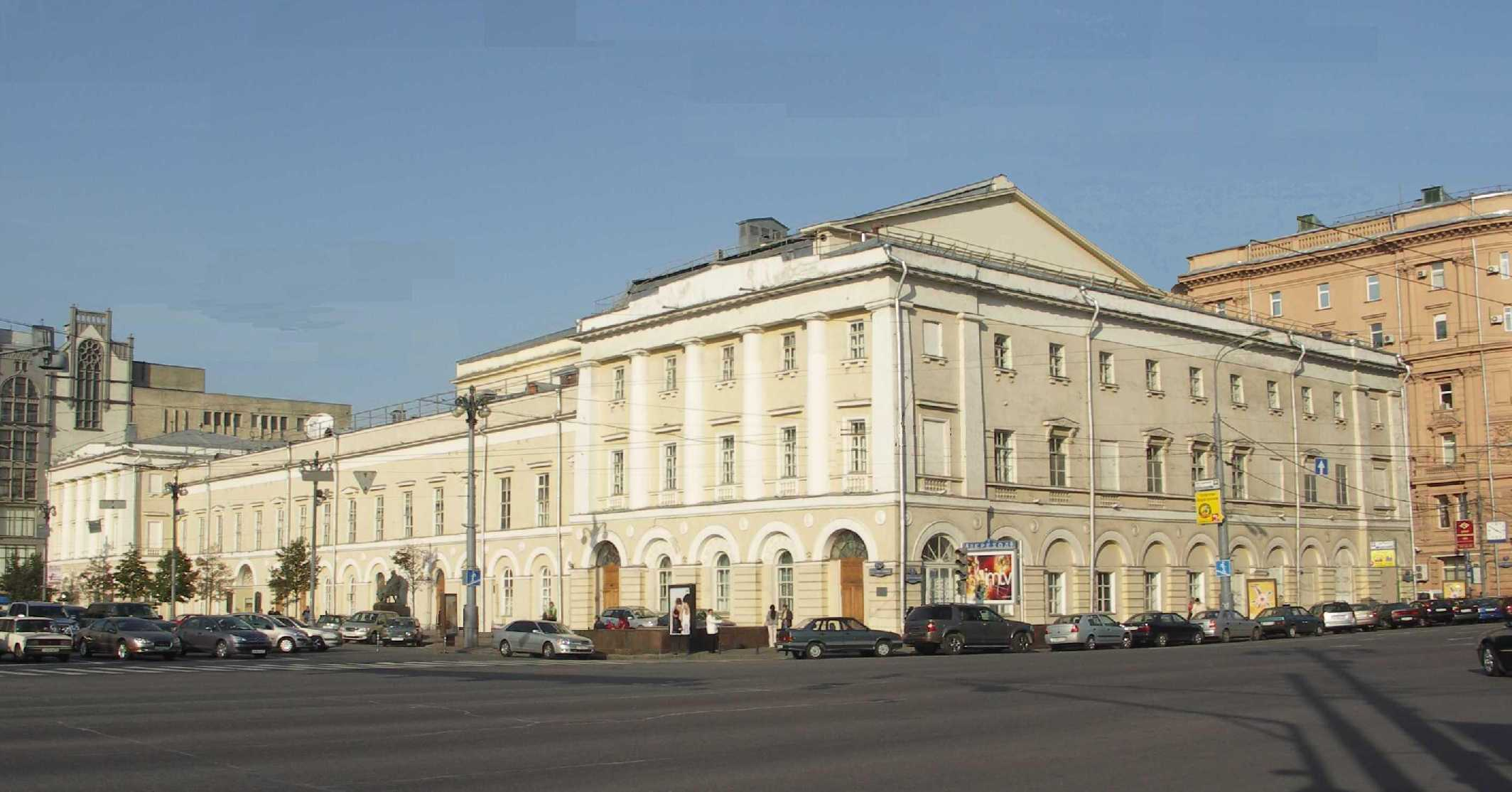
- Interactive map of Maly Theatre
- Address: Theatre Square; Moscow; Russia
- Coordinates: 55°45′35″N 37°37′14″E
- Owner: State theatre
- Capacity: 953 (main stage); 760 (second stage)
- Type: Drama theatre

Construction
- Opened: April 11, 1806 (at Pashkov House); October 14, 1824 (at Theatre Square)

Website
- www.maly.ru

Maly Theatre (Russian: Малый театр, lit. 'Small Theatre' as opposed to the nearby Bolshoi) is a theatre in Moscow, Russia, principally associated with the production of plays. Established in 1806 and operating on its present site on the Theatre Square since 1824, the theatre traces its history to the Moscow University drama company, established in 1756. In the 19th century, Maly was "universally recognized in Russia as the leading dramatic theatre of the century", and was the home stage for Mikhail Shchepkin and Maria Yermolova. 40 of Alexander Ostrovsky's 54 plays premiered at Maly, and the theatre was known as The House of Ostrovsky. The Maly Theatre in Moscow and Alexandrinsky Theatre in Saint Petersburg "to a great extent determined the development of Russian theatre during the 19th and 20th century".

Maly Theatre positions itself as a traditional drama theatre that produces classical heritage plays. For example, the 2009–2010 season program of Maly included plays by Russian authors from Denis Fonvizin to Mikhail Bulgakov, and a single play by Molière. The second stage of Maly, located in Zamoskvorechye District, also performs plays by W. Somerset Maugham, Luigi Pirandello and Eugene Scribe. Maly had a long tradition of producing William Shakespeare but, as of 2026, performed only one Shakespearian play, The Merry Wives of Windsor on its second stage.

Maly Theatre employs a staff of over seven hundred, including over one hundred drama actors. It is the only drama theatre in Russia that has retained a symphony orchestra and a professional choir. The theatre also operates Shchepkin Theatre School, Moscow's oldest drama school, established in 1809 as the Imperial Theatre School.

== History ==
The exact year of Maly's establishment is debated. In the 19th and 20th century, it was agreed that it was established in 1824, the year when the theatre moved into its Theatre Square building. The centennial of Maly was celebrated in 1924, and the 175th anniversary in 1999. However, the official bicentennial was moved to 2006, based on the establishment of the Imperial Moscow Theatre in 1806. Some of the shows produced by the Imperial Moscow Theatre premiered as early as 1804, and its company continued the tradition of Michael Maddox's company, which was established in 1780. The theatre website dates back its history to the year 1756.

=== Predecessors ===
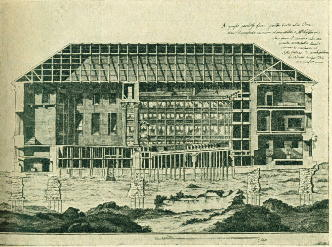
Petrovsky theatre, 1780

In 1756 empress Elisabeth of Russia decreed the establishment of a "Russian language theatre for comedies and tragedies". The ukaz was largely targeting Saint Petersburg—then devoid of any public entertainment—and specifically instructed that actors be recruited from Fyodor Volkov's company, which had already relocated from Yaroslavl to the capital. When Volkov and his company moved to Saint Petersburg, playwright Alexander Sumarokov became the first theatre manager.

Also in 1756, Moscow University students formed the Free Theatre (Вольный театр, free as in liberty and independence). By 1757, the amateur company was recruiting professional female singers and teachers of singing. Rector Ivan Shuvalov planned to build the university's own theatre hall, but later made an agreement with Italian impresario Giovanni Battista Locatelli, who managed the Opera House at the Red Gates. Locatelli opera, established in the beginning of 1759, was suffering financially, and the impoverished impresario willfully shared his stage with Shuvalov's company. The first show, The New Arrival by Marc-Antoine Legrand, premiered at the Opera House on May 25, 1759. Plays by Molière, Kheraskov, Rousseau were a success with Moscow audiences, but the death of Elisabeth in 1762, the subsequent twelve-month official mourning, and Shuvalov's retirement killed the theatre, and the company dispersed.

Between 1763 and 1766, various Russians and foreigners attempted to set up a permanent theatre in Moscow and failed. In 1776, Catherine II of Russia awarded the theatre license to prince Pyotr Vasilyevich Ouroussoff. Urusov teamed with English impresario Michael Maddox and erected a large wooden theatre on Petrovka Street, west of Neglinnaya River (the site of present-day Bolshoi Theatre). This hall, named Petrovsky Theatre, burnt down in February 1780. Urusov stepped out of the business and Maddox became the sole venturer. In five months, Maddox built and outfitted a three-storey stone theatre on the same site; the premiere, Wanderers by A. O. Ablesimov, ran on December 30, 1780. Maddox assembled a small but professional company and left the choice of plays and style to the actors. In 1783, the theatre produced 30 new plays and held 70 performances. Moscow governor Vasily Dolgorukov became the most influential supporter of the new theatre, but could not improve its finances. By 1790, Maddox was bankrupt. the theatre was nationalized de facto by the new governor, Alexander Prozorovsky. Petrovsky Theatre, managed by the Imperial Board of Theatres, operated until another fire destroyed it on October 22, 1805.

=== First decades ===
In 1806, the government of Alexander I established the Imperial Moscow Theatre in place of the former Petrovsky. The new theatre consolidated actors from state and private companies into the unified state company, buying out serf actors from their private owners (among them Stepan Mochalov and his five-year-old son Pavel Mochalov). Alexander himself joined the trading, pressing reluctant slave owners to cut their prices. The new company officially premiered April 11, 1808, at the Pashkov House with a double act of Servant of Two Masters by Carlo Goldoni and Poverty and Chivalry by August von Kotzebue. For the next two or three decades, foreign plays dominated the program. Kotzebue, particularly, was favored for his ability to "enchant" the audience.

Carlo Rossi designed the new building, built in wood on Arbat Square. The new Arbatsky Theatre opened April 10, 1808, with Bayan by Sergey Glinka. In 1812, when Napoleon's forces approached Moscow, governor Fyodor Rostopchin delayed evacuation of the company until the last moment: actors fled in disarray when Moscow was already ablaze. Some died on the road, some joined Saint Petersburg companies, and others returned to Moscow in 1813. Arbatsky Theatre had burned down, and the company performed in Apraksin House on Znamenka Street and, since 1818, in Pashkov House.

In 1820, the state began redevelopment of Theatre Square. Joseph Bove designed a grand opera theatre (the future Bolshoy) on the site of former Petrovsky with four identical buildings around it. One of these, the Vargin House, was built with a small theatre hall which the Imperial Theatre leased for its drama company. The owner of the buildings, caught in the politics of war minister Alexander Chernyshyov, soon went broke and ended up in jail. and by 1830, the state had bought out the property.

January 5, 1823, Alexander I created a new Moscow Board of Theatres that reported to Moscow's governor, making Moscow theatre independent from the Saint Petersburg board. Governor Dmitry Golitsyn became an influential fundraiser for the theatre and arranged emancipation of serf actors. In the same year, future stars Mikhail Shchepkin and Pavel Mochalov joined the company, immediately receiving top billings. Later, in the 1830s, cast hiring was influenced by Shchepkin, who hired and mentored future stars Prov Sadovsky and Ivan Samarin.

The smaller stage in Vargin House (Maly) opened October 14, 1824 with Alexey Verstovsky's Lily of Narbonne. The larger Bolshoy opened on January 6, 1825. The name Maly (small) emerged in the same year, and referred specifically to the building and not the company. Bolshoy and Maly theatres were run as a single company (Imperial Moscow Theatre), sharing an orchestra, choir, ballet, and even props. Standard weekly programs for Maly in 1825 included three German, two French, and one "German or French" daily slots, with just one Friday night open to Russian plays. Thursdays and Fridays at Bolshoy were reserved for "light comedy" or musical genres. Thus, popular drama was regularly performed at the Bolshoy stage, alone or bundled with opera and ballet. For example, the January 31, 1828 night at Bolshoy stage for the benefit of Mikhail Shchepkin featured The Robbers by Friedrich Schiller, a single-act French opera, and a "vaudeville ballet by Alexander Shakhovskoy in rhyme and free verse with machines, flooding of the entire theatre, diverse dancing and music compiled from folk songs".

In the second quarter of the century native Russian plays gradually increased their share. Maly performances included works by Vasily Zhukovsky, Alexander Griboyedov (Woe from Wit 1831 featuring both Shchepkin and Pavel Mochalov). Alexander Pushkin (Ruslan and Ludmila 1825, The Fountain of Bakhchisaray 1827, The Gypsies 1832) and lesser known, now forgotten authors. In three decades, from the 1820s to the 1840s, the theatre shed the over-dramatization of vaudeville and romanticism and replaced it with "something approaching a realistic style [that] we would recognize today." The former Vargin House was expanded to its present size by Konstantin Thon between 1838 and 1840. The new stage allowed use of elaborate box sets that became standard practice at Maly, while Bolshoy conservatively relied on primitive wing-and-border cloth sets.

=== House of Ostrovsky ===
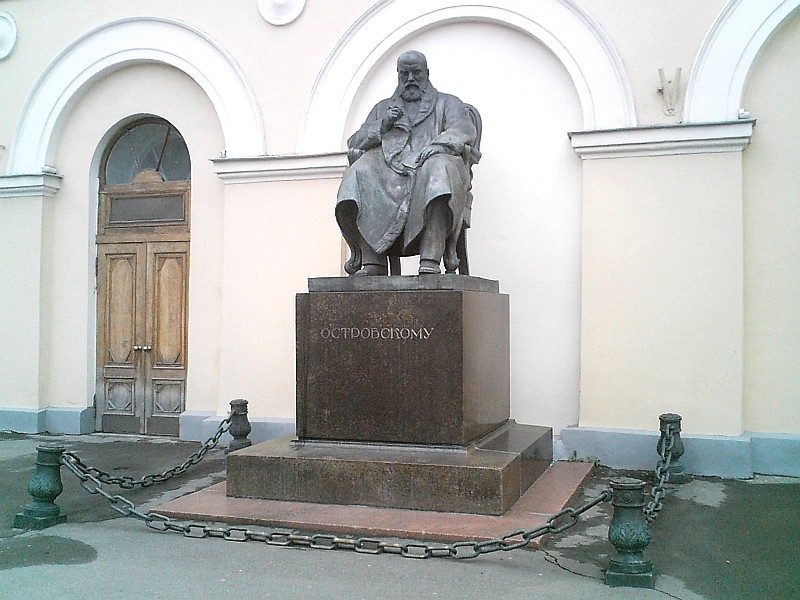
Monument to Alexander Ostrovsky at the main entrance to Maly, sculptor Nikolay Andreyev

In 1849 former court clerk and university dropout Alexander Ostrovsky wrote It's a Family Affair, a play that was banned by state censorship. Ostrovsky continued writing, and in 1853 Maly produced two of his plays: The Morning of a Young Man and Don't Sit in a Sledge You Don't Own. For the next thirty years, Maly produced one or two new plays by Ostrovsky each year. Ostrovsky's modern drama became a trademark for the theatre; previously known as House of Shchepkin, Maly became House of Ostrovsky. Plays by Ostrovsky appeared difficult to old-school actors like Schepkin, but helped in establishing a new generation of Maly actors. Prov Sadovsky, promoted by Shchepkin, became the "primary interpreter of Ostrovsky". Ostrovsky lived in poverty due to hostility of the Imperial Theatre Board, and ironically, he was appointed director of Moscow Theatre Board shortly before his death, becoming the head of Maly. Public activities by Ostrovsky contributed to the establishment of national playwright's union (1865) and abolition of state monopoly on theatre (1882). As a manager, Ostrovsky formed lasting relationships with the cast, campaigned for professional stage training, and even conducted statistical surveys of the audience.

Other Russian authors who wrote for Maly were Ivan Turgenev (A Provincial Lady, 1851 and A Month in the Country, 1872), Aleksey Pisemsky (two plays that premiered in 1866 and 1875), and Alexander Sukhovo-Kobylin (Scenes from the Past, 1854–1869). In 1878 young Anton Chekhov wrote his first large-scale drama Platonov specifically for Maria Yermolova, but she rejected the play and it was not published until 1923. The Miserly Knight by Alexander Pushkin premiered in Maly posthumously in January 1853, three months later than in Saint Petersburg's Alexandrinsky Theatre. Numerically, quality Russian drama remained scarce: between 1862 and 1881 Maly and Alexandrinsky theatres together produced a total of 607 foreign plays, 500 Russian vaudevilles and only 120 "serious" original Russian plays (including 49 by Ostrovsky).

The last quarter of the 19th century, coincident with Ostrovsky's brief tenure at Maly, brought forward the new generation of lead actors that "could be described as a constellation of great personalities". Maria Yermolova, daughter of the theatre prompter, joined the company at the age of 17 in 1870. She was confined to vaudeville until six years later, when she obtained the role of Laurencia in Fuente Ovejuna. The fiery show incited political demonstrations and was shut down by authorities, while Yermolova instantly became the lead actress of Maly. Yermolova played The Maid of Orleans, her greatest success, for 18 years (1884–1902); In 1894, the show moved onto Bolshoy stage to maximize revenue. Actor and playwright Prince Sumbatov, known under stage name Alexander Yuzhin, was also active for six decades (1877–1926) as lead actor and playwright. According to Vladimir Nemirovich-Danchenko, "demonically hard working" Yuzhin "filled every step with energy, persistence, and determination", and expressed the same qualities in his own plays. Instead of relying on professional directors, the star cast of Yuzhin, Yermolova, Mikhail Sadovsky, Alexander Lensky, and others collectively directed their own shows.

=== Revolution, reforms and stagnation ===
The period of World War I and Russian Civil War brought forward experimental theatre of Vsevolod Meyerhold, Alexander Tairov, and other independent directors. Maly, on the contrary, consistently preserved the realistic tradition established in the 19th century. Commissar of Education Anatoly Lunacharsky, married to Maly actress Natalya Rozenel, actively sponsored the theatre and wrote drama plays for it while the public and left-wing art circles neglected Maly in favor of new theatres.

The theatre that was once governed by its lead actors gradually became a director's theatre. In the 1920s, Maly was unconditionally ruled by directors Nikolay Volkonsky, Ivan Platon, Lev Prozorovsky, and CEO Vladimir Vladimirov, who replaced ailing Yuzhin in 1926. Vladimirov's haphazard, authoritative management style alienated lead actors like Alexander Ostuzhev and contemporary playwrights. In the second half of the 1930s, Maly absorbed first-rate actors from now defunct experimental companies (Igor Ilyinsky, Mikhail Zharov) but it was hired visiting directors who re-established Maly as the leading drama theatre in Moscow.

Sergey Radlov produced Othello (December 1935) starring deaf Alexander Ostuzhev, and the play became a breakthrough for the theatre and the actor. Director Aleksey Dikiy, according to the theatre's web site, became one of the most controversial characters in Soviet theatre and cinema. A star of Moscow Art Theatre since 1910, he leaned to experiment and left for an independent director's career in 1927. After directing Tarelkin's Death at Maly in 1936, Dikiy vanished into GULAG, but returned to Maly in September 1944 and directed five more plays there. His stage partner Boris Babochkin, another vagrant director and the star of Chapaev, directed and played at Maly for the last two decades of his life.

During Khrushchev Thaw, Maly had its spark of novelty, starting with the 1956 production of The Power of Darkness directed by Boris Ravenskikh and starring Igor Ilyinsky, who was personally torn between allegiance to communist ideology and Leo Tolstoy's ideas. By 1968, state control over theatres tightened. Maly, being a "court theatre", was especially pressed for obedience. It even became an "exile" for once independent directors Boris Lvov-Anokhin and Leonid Kheyfets, a place deemed "safe enough" to produce a stage version of Brezhnev's trilogy. Nevertheless, the theatre at this time experienced some of its true successes, like Innokenty Smoktunovsky playing Tsar Fiodor (Tsar Fiodor Ioannovich, 1973) or Ilyinsky playing Leo Tolstoy in the 1978 premiere of Return to his circuits by Ion Druţă.

== Current company ==
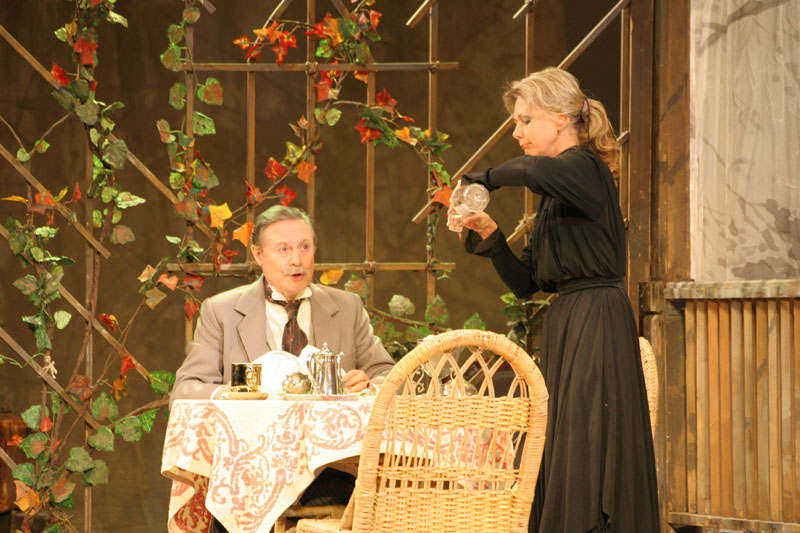
Yury Solomin in The Seagull, 2006

As of 2009, Maly employs over a hundred professional stage actors. The cast includes a People's Artist of the USSR - Yury Solomin, and 33 People's Artists of Russia.

The current (2009–2010 season) program of Maly includes plays almost exclusively by Russian authors (Mikhail Bulgakov, Anton Chekhov, Denis Fonvizin, Nikolay Gogol, Alexander Griboyedov, Pyotr Karatygin, Alexander Ostrovsky, Alexander Pushkin, A. K. Tolstoy) and a single play by Molière. The theatre announced, as of August 2009, upcoming premieres of Cabal of Hypocrites by Bulgakov and Smart Things by Samuil Marshak.

=== Main building ===
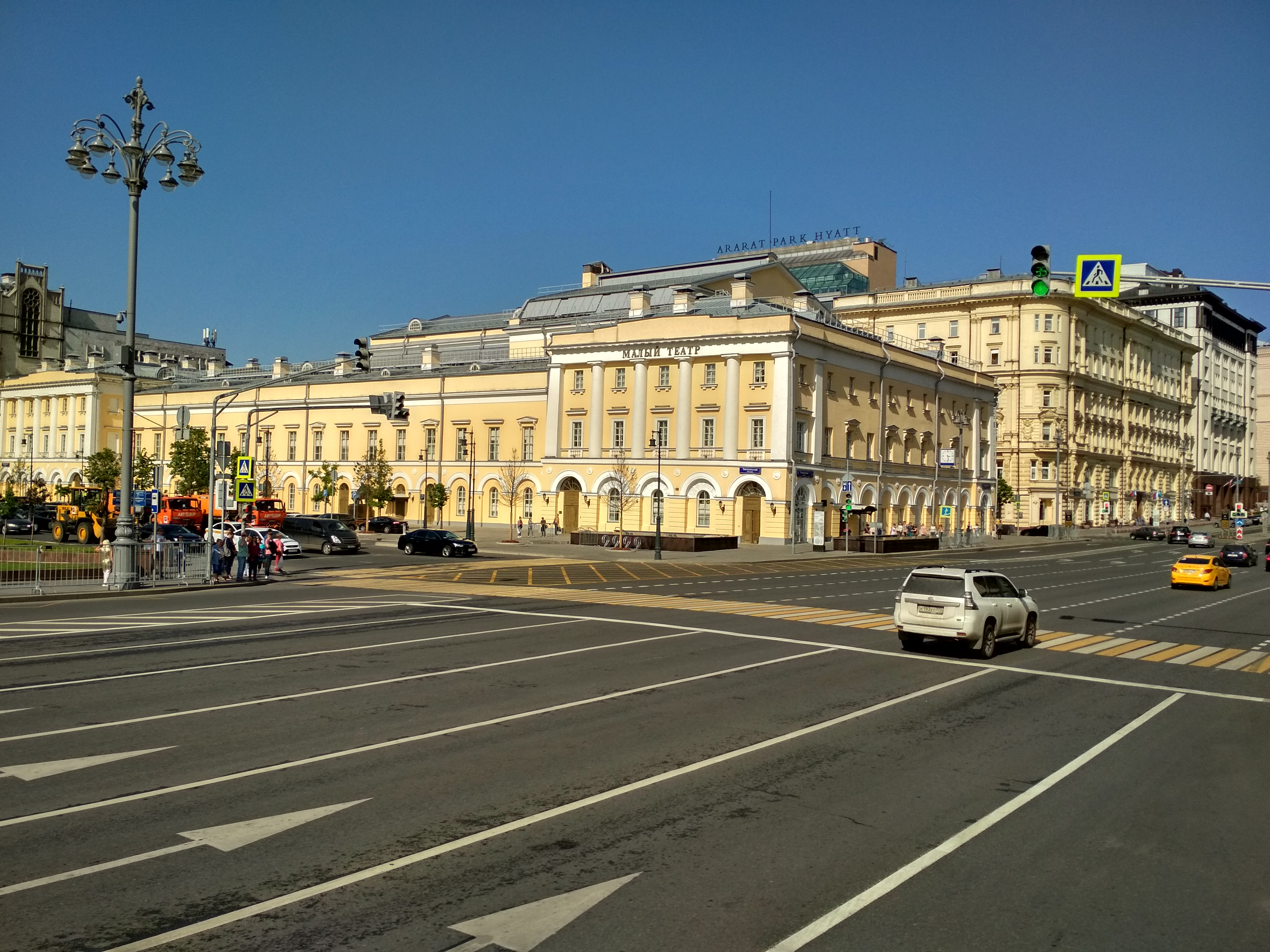
Building of the Maly Theater after reconstruction. May 2018

Maly Theatre, facing Petrovka Street, is the last remaining of four identical buildings erected in the 1820s by Joseph Bove for private customers. In the 19th century, the other three buildings were demolished and rebuilt, and Theatre Square lost its original highly symmetrical appearance. The Maly building itself has little in common with the original Vargin House of 1824. Vargin House, squeezed between Petrovka and the wide, recently created Neglinny Lane, was narrower than the present-day building; its Petrovka facade housed an open shopping arcade.

Between 1838 and 1840, the theatre acquired neighboring land lots and was completely rebuilt by Konstantin Thon. Thon expanded the building to the northwest and northeast, taking over the land of Neglinny Lane. The arcade disappeared, and all the interiors were gutted and redesigned from scratch. Thon retained Bove's stern neoclassical styling and left most wall surfaces unadorned. In 1945 this "omission" was rectified, and the facade acquired their present shape with a continuous molding separating first and ground floors and small cornices above first floor windows. The main hall retains its 1840 layout and plafond artwork was recreated after World War II. Hall capacity, originally set at exactly 1,000 seats, has been reduced to 953 seats.

=== Schepkin School ===
The theatre recruits new actors primarily from its own Shchepkin Theatre School, an undergraduate level drama school located in a neighboring block on Neglinnaya Street. The school, established in 1809, has always been run as a division of Maly. Maly's current CEO Victor Korshunov and art director Yury Solomin are also deans of Schepkin School. Maly Theatre and Shchepkin School are two of eleven Russian institutions eligible for the presidential theatre support grants established in 2005. Both are also included in the State Code of Particularly Valuable Objects of Cultural Heritage, a list of top priority cultural sites and institutions that, by law, are state property and may not be privatized.

=== Second stage ===
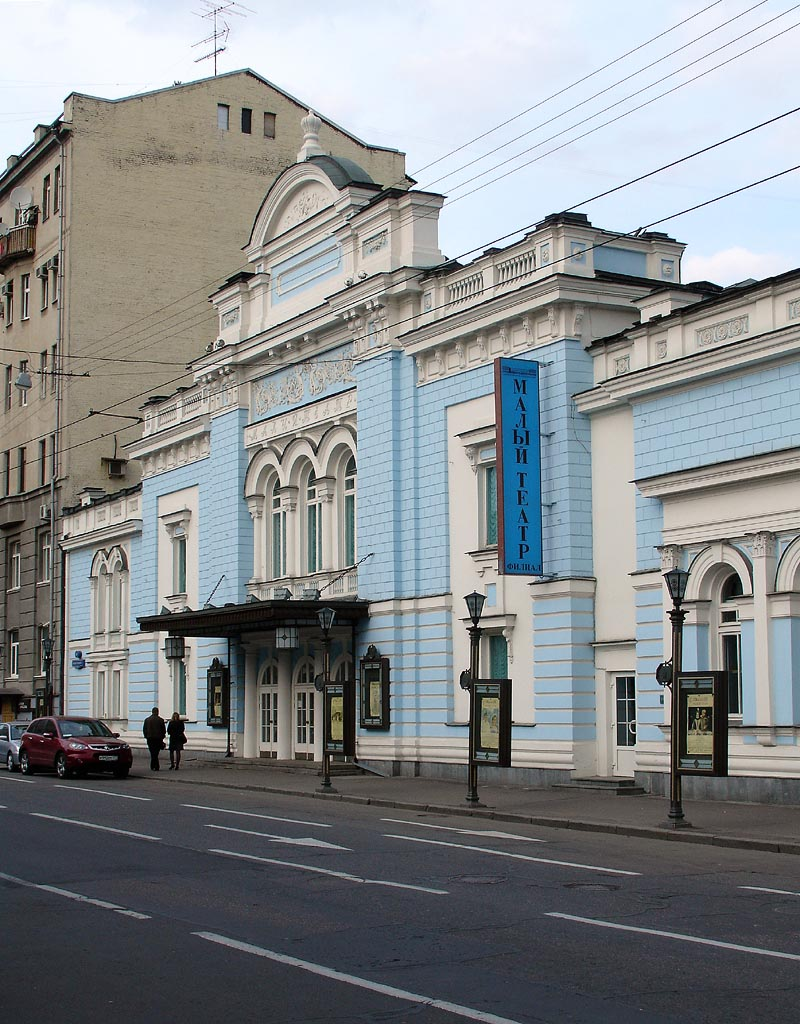
Entrance to the second stage on Bolshaya Ordynka Street (the theatre hall itself, dominating the block, is not visible in this photo)

The branch, or the second stage, of Maly Theatre is located at the south end of Bolshaya Ordynka Street in Zamoskvorechye District. Its eclectic building was built in the 1900s as a cinema, and rebuilt in 1914 into a theatre hall for the Struysky company. In the interwar period the building housed an independent Zamoskvorechye Theatre.

Former Struysky Theatre became a branch of Maly after World War II and has since been expanded. The last major renovation was completed in 1995. As of 2009 it has 760 seats (the main stage has 935 seats).

The second stage provides an experimental venue for an otherwise conservative company, and ventures into musical theatre genres, starting with Alexander Kolker's Krechinsky's Wedding musical (1997). It performs a larger share of plays by foreign authors.

== Sources ==
- Bubnova, O. V. (2006). "Ot Locatelli k Medoksu, ot Medoksa k domu Schepkina (От Локателли - к Медоксу, от Медокса - к "Дому Щепкина")" (in Russian). Nashe Nasledie magazine (online version only).
- Banham, Michael (1995). The Cambridge guide to theatre. Cambridge University Press. ISBN 978-0-521-43437-9. "Maly."
- Cody, Gabrielle H.; Sprichorn, Evert (2007). The Columbia encyclopedia of modern drama. Columbia University Press. ISBN 978-0-231-14424-7.
- Hochmann, Stanley, ed. (1984). McGraw-Hill Encyclopedia of World Drama: An International Reference Work in 5 Volumes. McGraw-Hill Companies. ISBN 978-0-07-079169-5.
- Leach, Robert; Borovsky, Victor (1999). A history of Russian theatre. Cambridge University Press. ISBN 978-0-521-43220-7.
- Londré, Felicia Hardison; Berthold, Margot (1999). The history of world theater: from the English restoration to the present. Continuum International Publishing Group. p. 307. ISBN 978-0-8264-1167-9. "maly theatre."
- Senelick, Lawrence (1991). National theatre in northern and eastern Europe, 1746–1900. Cambridge University Press. ISBN 978-0-521-24446-6.
- Smelyansky, Anatoly; Miles, Patrick; Senelick, Lawrence (1999). The Russian theatre after Stalin. Cambridge University Press. ISBN 978-0-521-58794-5.
