= Maria Yermolova =

Russian actress

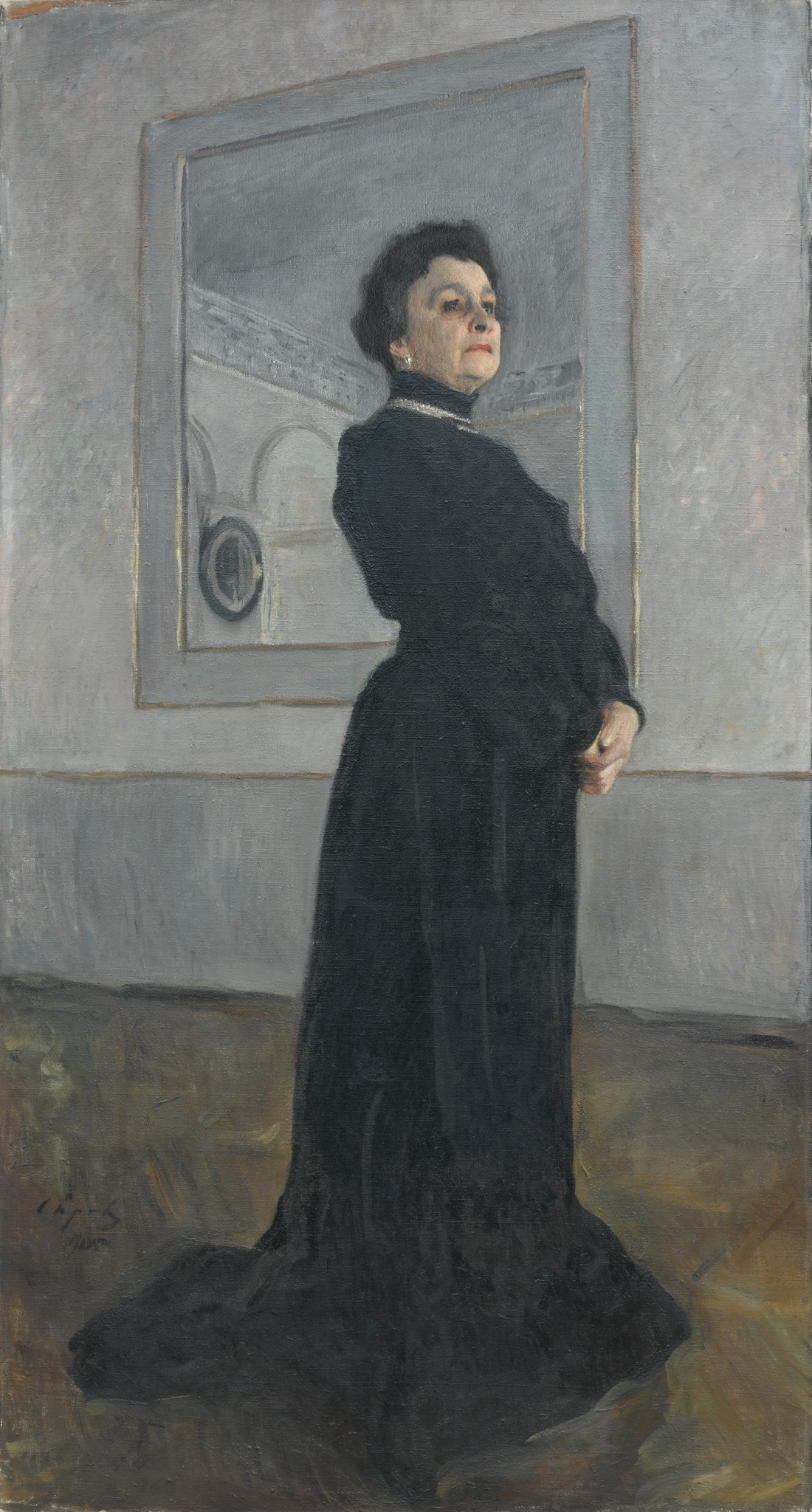
Portrait of Maria Yermolova by Valentin Serov.

Maria Nikolayevna Yermolova (Russian: Мария Николаевна Ермолова; 15 July [O.S. 3 July] 1853 in Moscow – 12 March 1928, id.) was a Russian actress, said to be the greatest in the history of the Maly Theatre in Moscow and the first person to be proclaimed the "People's Artist of the Republic" (1921).

== Career ==
In the course of her 50-year career, Yermolova particularly excelled in the roles which allowed her to "emphasize her independence of spirit and her popular heroism in defiance of corrupt authority", as the Encyclopædia Britannica put it. Her contemporary and fellow Russian actor Constantin Stanislavski proclaimed her the greatest actress he had ever observed, thus placing her above Sarah Bernhardt and Eleonora Duse.

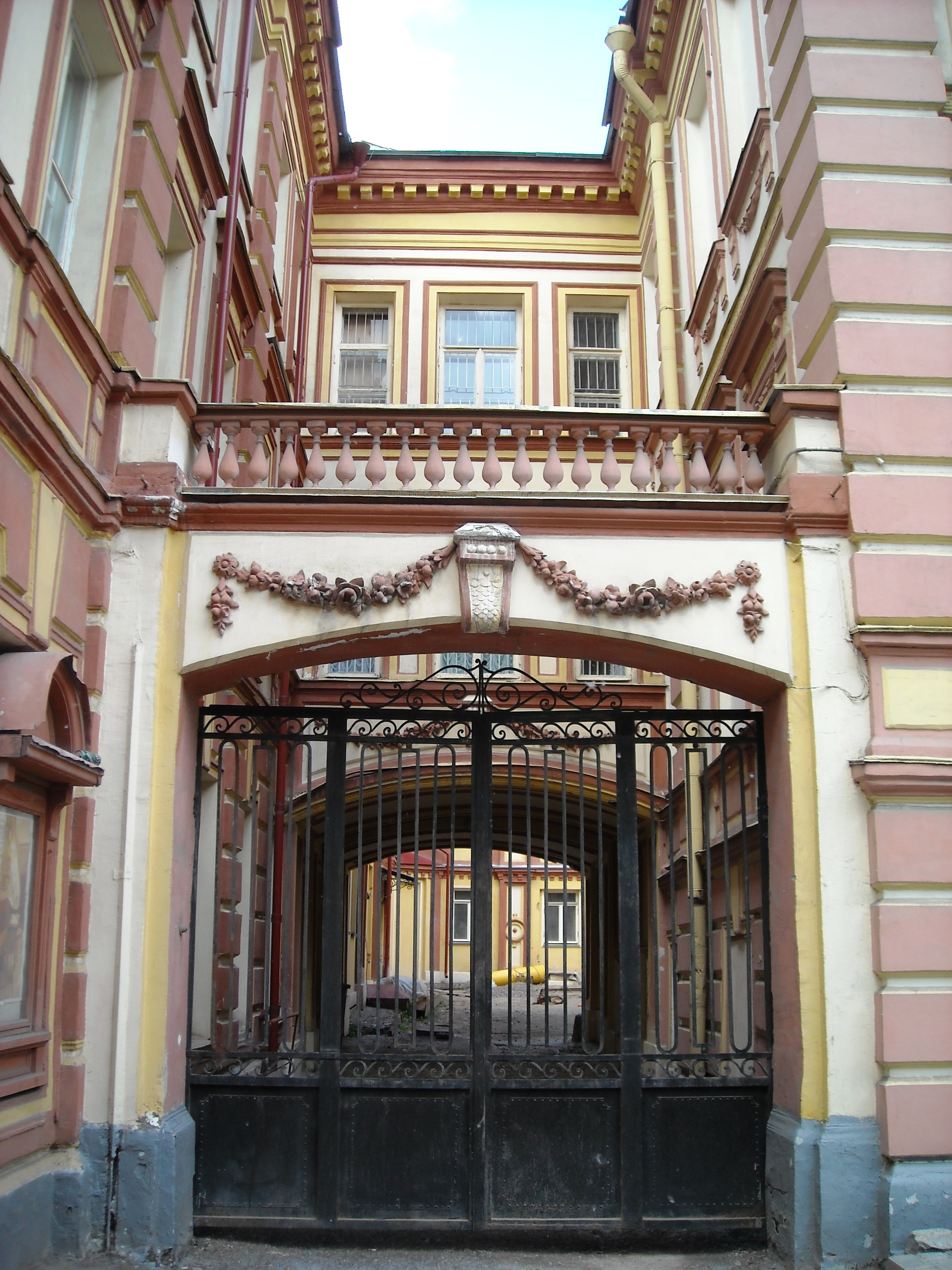
Maria Yermolova House

From 1889 to 1928 she lived in a house on Tverskoy Boulevard in Moscow.

Following her death, her flat was designated a national monument, and the Yermolova Theatre in the Tverskoy District of Moscow still bears her name. A minor planet 3657 Ermolova, discovered by Soviet astronomer Lyudmila Zhuravlyova in 1978 is named after her. Ermolova crater on Venus is also named in her honor.
