= Tatiana Davydova =

Aleksandra Tchaikovsky's daughter and Pyotr Tchaikovsky's niece

- Татьяна Львовна Давыдова
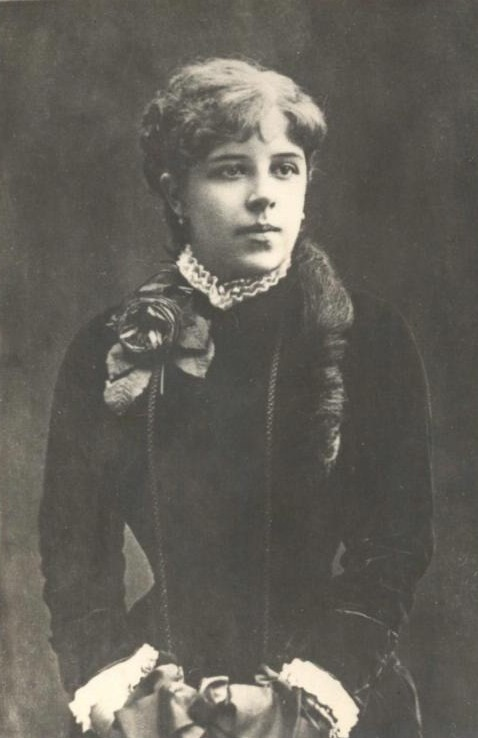
- Born: 6 September 1861; Kamianka, Russian Empire
- Died: 1 February 1887 (aged 25); Saint-Petersburg, Russian Empire

Tatiana Lvovna Davydova (Russian: Давыдова, Татьяна Львовна) (September 18 [O.S. September 6] 1861, in Kamianka, Chigirinsky uyezd, Kiev province, Russian Empire – January 31 [O.S. January 19] 1887 or February 1 [O.S. January 20] 1887, St. Petersburg, Russian Empire) was the niece of Russian composer Pyotr Ilyich Tchaikovsky. She is the elder sister of Vladimir and Yuri Davydovs.

Tchaikovsky's biographer Valery Sokolov distinguished two periods in Tatyana Davydova's life — the fortunate (until 1879) and the "dramatic" (1879–1887).

Tatiana was the eldest daughter of the composer's sister Alexandra and her husband Lev Davydov. Tchaikovsky was close to his niece, dedicating Six Vocal Duets (Op. 46) to her, and when she became pregnant by pianist Stanislav Blumenfeld in 1883, the composer and his brother Modest took Tatiana to Paris and arranged for her to give birth. After she gave birth to a boy, the composer himself registered the child's birth, arranged for his baptism, and provided financial support. Tchaikovsky participated in his adoption by his older brother Nikolai. Valery Sokolov wrote: "The niece was destined to become one of the deep wounds in Pyotr Ilyich's soul, the scars of which remained for a very long time". Tatiana Davydova died, probably of a morphine overdose, in St. Petersburg at the age of 25. She was buried in the cemetery of the Alexander Nevsky Lavra, but the place of her burial has not been preserved".

In 2021 the Russian composer and music historian Valery Sokolov dedicated to Tatiana Davydova a large (110 pages) article Tatiana Davydova in the life of P. I. Tchaikovsky in the collection of scientific publications St. Petersburg Musical Archive, published under the auspices of the Tchaikovsky Society. In it he reconstructed the biography of the girl and tried to determine the role of her problems in the life and work of the composer.

== Biography ==
=== Childhood and youth ===
Tatiana Lvovna Davydova (Tchaikovsky called her Tanya, Tanyusha, Tanyurka, Tanka in his letters and diaries) was born on September 6 [18], 1861, in the estate Kamianka in the Chigirinsky district of Kiev province, where her parents, Alexandra Ilinichna (Tchaikovsky's sister) and Lev Vasilyevich Davydov, (Note: The Davydovs' children, in order of seniority, were Tatiana, Vera, Anna, Natalia (called Tasia by her family), Dmitry (known as Mitya), Vladimir (referred to as Bob), and Yuri.) lived permanently. Pyotr Ilyich responded to this event with a poem of his own composition, which included the line: "Let's celebrate, great Tatiana! Rejoice, all Russia".

In early childhood, Tatiana demonstrated remarkable abilities. By the age of four, she had already learned to read and spoke fluent French. At the same time, the girl, under the guidance of her mother, began piano lessons and already performed four-handed with Alexandra Davydova Red Sarafan by Aleksandr Varlamov, Chizhik-Pyzhik, and "the first scale" (Note: (according to Sokolov, "the first scale" here means the scale in the key of C major, C being the first note in the traditional octave. The piano keys are naturally laid out according to the C major scale). For some time, Alexandra Davydova noted great successes in her daughter's mastery of the instrument, but in 1868, a new governess, who had a musical education, criticized the girl's musical skills and forced her to return to the scales and engage in musical theory.

In the summer of 1870, Tatiana and her mother visited St. Petersburg for the first time. Returning to Kamianka, in January 1872, the girl began studying English. In letters to Tchaikovsky, Alexandra Davydova asked him to send the notes of complex etudes for piano to Tatiana and her sisters but noted the emergence of difficulties in their upbringing — "it is a pity to look at yawning girls".

David Brown, a British researcher of Tchaikovsky's work, claimed that the origins of the idea for the ballet Swan Lake date back to 1871, when the family of Alexandra Davydova, with the active participation of the composer himself, staged an amateur production of this very plot in the estate of Kamianka. Pyotr Ilyich acted as stage director and ballet master, as well as providing musical accompaniment ("Uncle Pyotr, with a flushed face, wet with sweat, when he sang the melody, presented quite an amusing spectacle"). His younger brother Modest danced the Prince, and little Tatiana Davydova performed the role of Odette. Also, with the active assistance of Tchaikovsky, and with Tatiana's participation, were staged the plays the Misanthrope by Molière and Marriage by Nikolai Gogol.

In the fall of 1873, Alexandra Davydova and her children moved to Switzerland, where the Davydovs lived first in one of the main centers of the Swiss Riviera — the city of Vevey (1873–1874), and then in Geneva (1874–1876). Only then did the mother think about the need for the systematic education of her elder daughters in a private or public school.

The 12-year-old Tatiana Davydova was assigned to a school of the highest level (French école supérieure) in Vevey. Before that, Pyotr Ilyich went there to find out the possibilities of boarding schooling for his sister's two older daughters. Tatiana studied well, but the music teacher, "a certain Rotzenberg," a graduate of the Stuttgart Conservatory, "irritable and strict," inspired fear in the girl. He taught according to the "Rubinstein method" and charged 5 francs per hour. As a punishment for poor playing, he strongly beat Tatiana on her hands. Her mother, in a letter to her brother Modest, noted that Tatiana was a "windy" and "spoiled" girl, with a "fastidiousness of character". Alexandra Davydova wrote: "Her innocent pranks are endless, and she has become such a master of making fun that I tolerate, tolerate, yes, and rashohochuchuchuchatu. This difficult child only now began to get along with everyone and please me". That Tatiana was a difficult child in her early years was also noted in the memoirs of her niece, Galina von Meck. Tatiana took lessons in dancing and physics, which she noted as the most interesting in her letter, and practiced the Russian language.

It was in Switzerland that Tatiana Davydova's painful condition began to gradually increase: "All these days I have a strong flush to my head, my face is quite blue and a little swollen... nothing helps, and my head hurts a lot". At the same time, she had a growing sense of dissatisfaction with herself: "I lost the last shadows of beauty in me, and I myself am often frightened by the extent to which I am manipulative. I can make friends with anyone and imitate his habits, knowing that it is not good and dishonest. Then I feel that I do not love God enough and do not pray enough".

Since the summer of 1874, Tatiana and her sisters began attending public high school in Geneva. The girl made great strides in playing the zither and became, to her mother's worries, the central figure at the school ball. It was at this time that she first became interested in the works of Pyotr Ilyich and asked to have his works sent to Switzerland. From time to time, Tatiana took piano and harp lessons at the Geneva Conservatory. Alexandra Davydova even wrote in a letter to Modest Tchaikovsky that before leaving Switzerland, Tatiana participated in a certain concours de musique (French for "musical examination", as interpreted by Valery Sokolov) at the conservatory. The composer, who visited the Davydov family in Geneva, noted: "Tania has lost the appearance of an idle young lady here and therefore makes a very pleasant impression".

"At the age of 14–15, Tatiana Lvovna looked like a perfect beauty... Beautiful, intelligent, kind girl, Tatiana Lvovna gained numerous admirers early on. In Switzerland, several students of various colleges quarreled to gain her attention", her younger brother Yuri wrote in his memoirs.

In the spring of 1876, the head of the family decided to return his wife and children to Russia. In July of the same year, Alexandra Davydova and the children returned to her husband's estate. The pianist Stanislav Blumenfeld was invited from Kiev to teach her music. Her mother made plans to enroll the girl in university. At this time, however, Tchaikovsky wrote about Tatiana as his mother's "sore spot" and feared that "the closed sphere of family life is insufficient for her talented personality". In his opinion, "she is already weighed down by her fate".

In 1877, the attention of the Davydov family living in Kamianka turned to the problems of Pyotr Ilyich in connection with his failed marriage and severe mental crisis. Tatiana and Tchaikovsky's wife Antonina Miliukova, who came to Kamianka, became friends. Soon, however, their relationship escalated sharply. When Miliukova said that she wanted to commit suicide, Tatiana sharply replied, "Go now, but do not say it, because it is ridiculous: who wants to commit suicide does not talk about it." Sokolov assumed that the reason for this turn of affairs was Tatiana's impression of her favorite uncle's difficult experiences.

A complete surprise for the mother was the discovery of Tatiana's note shortly after the girl's 16th birthday (with the orthography of the original and the reconstruction of Valery Sokolov's punctuation): "Bury me close to Seryozha, I ask only for a marble slab and on it the name Tatyana, with no cross (?) at the feet[:] 'She did not love life and had no regrets!'" Sokolov assumed that the girl's mental trauma was related to one of her two young teachers, either Blumenfeld or the teacher who prepared her for university, a senior student of the Kiev Theological Academy, Bernatovich.

=== Adulthood ===
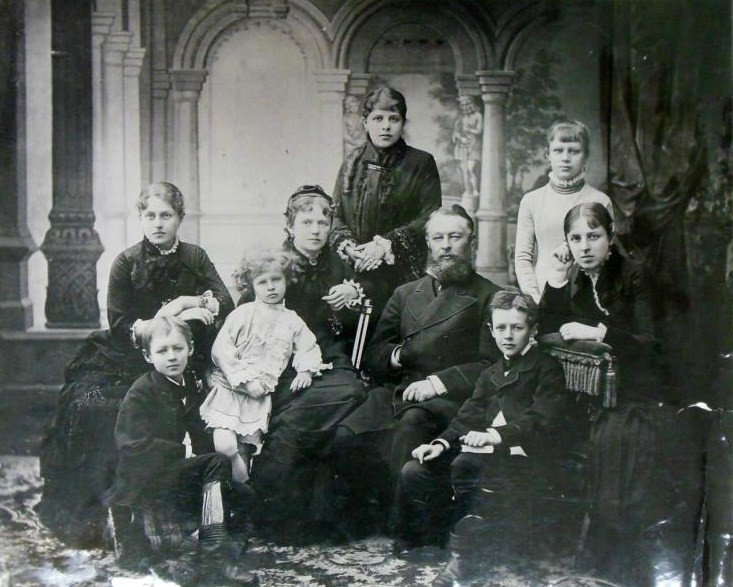
The Davydov family. Tatiana standing in the center of the back row, 1881.

Alexander Poznansky, an American biographer of Tchaikovsky, wrote that even before Tatiana was born, her parents dreamed of a "fabulous future" for their daughter. She was always a family favorite. Under the influence of universal adoration, Tatiana herself believed in her own exceptionalism.

Since the winter of 1878/1879, the Davydovs perceived their daughter as a grown-up young lady: in St. Petersburg, she went to theaters, balls, picnics, flirted, and attracted the attention of secular society. Her participation "in the court ball" and presentation to Emperor Alexander II were planned. Returning to Kamianka, Tatiana tried to continue leading a social life. In 1879, during a trip to Yalta, Tatiana attracted the close attention of two men at once — Prince Alexei Tsereteliev (Tsereteli) and 35-year-old Oryol landowner Koshkarov, who even made her an offer. Tchaikovsky was outraged by the latter fact, writing that Koshkarov was old and ugly, "but very clever and managed to interest Tanya with his uniqueness and authentic personality". Tatiana's new promising young man was Prince Trubetskoy, aged 24, an officer awarded the Cross of St. Georgy, "extremely handsome, kind, and sweet." He also made her a "formal proposal." The composer's niece gave her consent, but subject to the approval of the marriage by the groom's parents. They, who had once lived with their children in Vevey at the same time as the Davydovs, spoke favorably of the marriage but were unable to provide for their son financially. Their attempts to place him in the civil service for this reason postponed the marriage indefinitely.

In the fall of 1880, Tatiana went to Yalta again. She was introduced to Maria Feodorovna, the wife of the throne's successor Alexander Alexandrovich, the future Emperor Alexander III, and met Praskovia Konshina, who later became the wife of the statesman, senator, and Privy Councillor Anatoly Tchaikovsky — the composer's younger brother.

Some time later, Tatiana became close to one of the officers of the Hussar regiment near Kamianka. She wrote: "Glavatsky is in love with me, with me alone, and only with grief from my indifference fell in love with Vera, and told me that he was ready to kiss the whip with which I will beat him or something like that! ... After the ball, Glavatsky spoke to my mother and asked for the hand of both of us!" Valery Sokolov noted the seriousness of the religious, philosophical, and aesthetic issues raised in this letter of a 19-year-old girl (Tatiana discussed the prose of Fyodor Dostoevsky and Sergei Aksakov), but wrote that such topics in her correspondence are almost never found.

Tatiana's health continued to deteriorate: she "suffers from a completely incomprehensible disease for such a young girl — gastric catarrh. This disease is expressed by a complete lack of appetite, frequent colic, sickness, anemia, and premature and unhealthy obesity". Tchaikovsky, in a letter to Nadezhda von Meck, described the appearance of his two nieces, Tatiana and Vera: "As for the color of their hair and eyes: both have blue eyes, and their hair is blonde. However, not the lightest shade... The complexion of both nieces is pale, at the slightest excitement turning into a bright blush on the cheeks, as it generally happens with girls suffering from anemia". In December 1880, Tatiana Davydova's health deteriorated sharply ("she is haunted by headaches and all kinds of nervous attacks", "for 15 days that she has been out of bed, she does not get up and only incessantly suffers and weakens; no food, she vomits everything that she eats in moments of improvement"). Relatives attributed this to the indefinitely postponed marriage with Trubetskoy. In 1881, Alexandra Davydova took her daughter to Kiev for medical treatment.

It was Alexandra Davydova who, according to Alexander Poznansky, offered her daughter morphine, which she herself used for mood elevation and as a painkiller. The drug worked for a while but had an addictive effect.

In April 1881, the situation with Trubetskoy began to clear up. He retired and went into the civil service with a small salary of 600 rubles a year. Trubetskoy's father died, and the estate he inherited was ruined. Tatiana Davydova could receive 3000 rubles a year from her father but was, as Pyotr Ilyich put it, "very impractical and very spoiled." The young people were engaged, and the marriage was scheduled for the fall. On May 5, there was an unexpected rupture between the young people. According to Tchaikovsky's version, Trubetskoy "appeared to Tatiana in Moscow drunk and said many insulting words". The composer's American biographer even claimed that he tried to rape her. The girl threw her wedding ring in his face and demanded that he never show up again.

Sokolov put forward several hypotheses at once as to the causes of the breaking of the engagement:

- Trubetskoy's family's financial problems led them to find him a rich bride.
- Tatiana Davydova's frivolous behavior and the consequences of her drug consumption were notable. Anatoly Tchaikovsky at this time noted that Tatiana "is not only seriously ill but, no doubt, mentally, nervously, and psychologically... I am simply afraid that she will do something terrible".
- The low moral qualities of the prince himself were also evident. On May 2, the eve of the rupture, Anatoly Tchaikovsky met with Trubetskoy, who told him that he "went to look for brothels but could not find any good girls, and asked for a recommendation".

Tatiana returned to Kamianka "in a state close to insanity, all soaked in ether, morphine, and all sorts of horrors. She was even drinking in Moscow". Tchaikovsky wrote that the girl "considers herself dishonored, lost, unworthy to accept the caresses of relatives, because Trubetskoy was kept by her at the cost of straining all her strength only where everything was over" (Valery Sokolov believed that he meant an intimate relationship with the former fiancé). Tatiana screamed, sobbed, and convulsed in the composer's arms. Pyotr Ilyich himself tried to calm and distract her from her gloomy thoughts by talking to her, playing four-handed piano with her, and encouraging her to read.

For a short time, Tatiana Davydova met with Stanislav Bernatovich, head of the traffic service of the Fastov railroad. He was married, so the girl made plans to marry him after her lover's divorce from his wife. After the breakup with him, she began an affair with a rich merchant, Otto Kern, a German by birth. Kern made Tatiana an offer, but the girl evaded a direct answer. Her parents opposed the marriage, as Kern was not an aristocrat. In the spring of 1882, Tatiana resumed relations with pianist Stanislav Blumenfeld, who had previously been her private music teacher. One of their secret dates was witnessed by Pyotr Ilyich. He had once recommended the young pianist to the Davydovs, but now his intimacy with his niece irritated him. With indignation, he wrote that the girl allows herself with Blumenfeld what, according to his ideas, is peculiar only to prostitutes. Tatiana got pregnant, but her relatives did not notice it for a long time.

Tatiana moved to St. Petersburg, and the cover for the upcoming birth was provided by Pyotr (he was simply put in front of the fact of pregnancy in January 1883) and Modest Tchaikovsky, as well as her aunt Vera Butakova. Following this, the girl moved to Paris, where the composer was already staying, under the pretext of being treated for drug addiction by the then-famous psychiatrist and neurologist Jean-Martin Charcot. Modest, who had accompanied the girl, returned to Russia in mid-April, and all responsibility for her fate fell on the shoulders of Pyotr Ilyich. Valery Sokolov believed that already then the childless Nikolai Tchaikovsky had a plan to adopt his niece's future child. The boy, named Georgy, was born in Paris on April 26, 1883.

Another version of events is presented by Galina von Meck. In her version, the parents learned that Tatiana was pregnant. Davydova was sent abroad, and her son was born in Paris. The young mother could not return to the estate with her illegitimate son, so the eldest of the Tchaikovsky brothers adopted him. Tatiana, after giving birth in Paris, made the decision never to see Blumenfeld again, but she never forgot him. According to Galina von Meck, he was the girl's only love.

In May 1883, Tatiana returned to Kamianka. The family perceived her, according to Modest Tchaikovsky, as "a guest". In September of that year, she went to Paris to see Charcot's collaborator Dr. Ferret again, informing her family that she was going to marry him. However, she was accompanied on the trip by Kern, who, like those around her, was also convinced that she was ready to become Ferret's wife. Upon arriving in Paris, Tatiana learned that Ferret was marrying his compatriot. Treatment for addiction to the drug continued with alternating cold and hot water, but Davydova practically did not leave the house and remained bedridden. The state of her health was serious, and Tchaikovsky, realizing that "she has no interest in life and that nothing occupies and interests her," offered his niece the opportunity to make a career as an actress in France, without informing his own family.

In August 1884, Tatyana Davydova returned to Kamianka. Her mother noted a significant improvement in her health. In the winter of 1884 to 1885, the girl lived in Moscow with her sister Anna, who had married Nadezhda von Meck's son Nikolai. It seemed to those around her that she had returned to normal life: "sits, walks, and is very much in spirit," but she no longer seemed attractive to those around her. Davydova spent the winter of 1885 to 1886 with her mother and brothers in St. Petersburg. In mid-June, the composer brought her young son to the capital, where he was adopted by Nikolai Tchaikovsky.

=== Last years ===
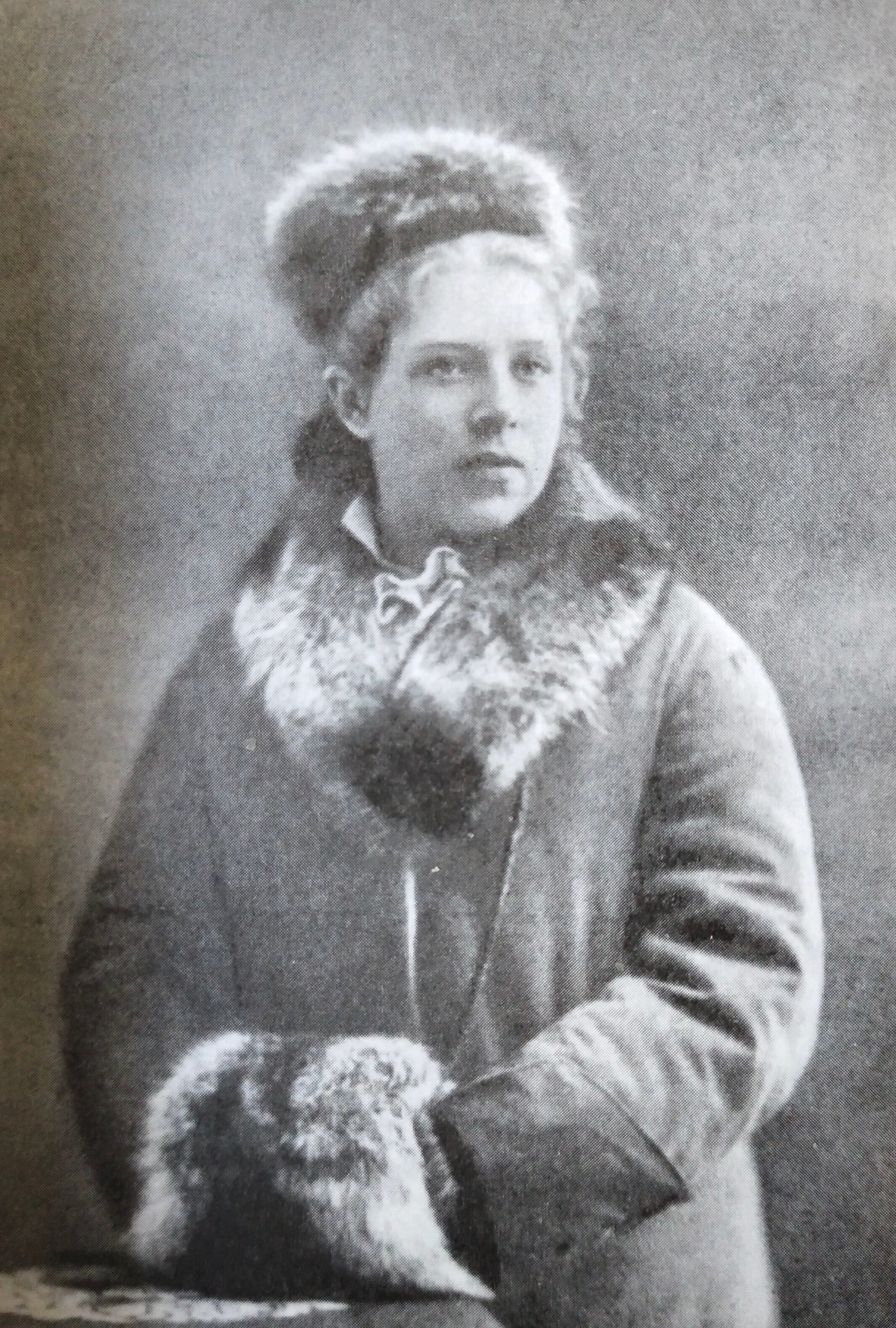
Tatiana Davydova in the 1880s.

The supposed recovery of her daughter by her relatives allowed Alexandra Tchaikovskaya, in 1886, to make Tatiana the tutor of her younger brothers Dmitry and Vladimir, who were studying and living at that time in St. Petersburg. Valery Sokolov believed that from the end of 1884 to 1887, she changed in many ways. Tatiana Davydova became calmer, her health was returning, and she devoted a lot of time to her household and the upbringing of her brothers. At the same time, he admitted that "loved ones simply 'waved goodbye' to the possibility of her full recovery, stopped dramatizing her problems, and resigned themselves to the possibility of her death". Tatiana Davydova died, according to various accounts, on January 19 or January 20 [February 1], 1887 in St. Petersburg. During a masquerade ball in the capital, she suddenly collapsed and soon died of a heart attack. Valery Sokolov thought it more accurate to date Davydova's death on January 20, noting that the masquerade was held late into the night. The newspaper Novoe Vremya dedicated a note to her death:

Today, at one o'clock at midnight, in the midst of a brilliant masquerade in the Noble Assembly, a tragic event occurred: a young woman of twenty-five, Mrs. Tatiana Davydova, died suddenly of a heart attack. She had hardly had time to be carried out of the hall to the restroom: her face immediately became lifeless, her eyes drooped, and her lower lip sagged. The champagne demanded by General Gresser only revived her for a few minutes. She had come to the masquerade in the company of a companion. The closest immediate cause of paralysis was, according to the doctor's certification, a tight corset. In addition, it was certified that the patient suffered from morphinomania. At the masquerade, attended by the Minister of Foreign Affairs N. K. Giers, French Ambassador de Laboulaye, the Spanish envoy Campo-Sagrado, the entire staff of the German, French, and Japanese embassies, and almost all of St. Petersburg's court and official nobility.

The second note, with a slightly different explanation of the cause of death, was published by Peterburgskaya Gazeta:

It was exactly 12:30 a.m. when Mrs. Davydova, strolling through the hall on the arm of one of her acquaintances, suddenly felt ill and, staggering, fell to the floor. There was a rush. Two men picked up the mask and carried her to the ladies' restroom, where she was placed on a couch. Having freed the lady from the constricted corset and removed all unnecessary clothing, they began to administer rubbing and spraying with water. But it was too late; her face was covered with a mortal pallor. Death was caused by a heart attack resulting from anemia of the whole body.

The third testimony belongs to the memoirist Galina von Meck, Tatiana Davydova's niece:

One day the brother of her companion [E. M. Molas], wishing to amuse Tatiana, suggested that she go with him to a masked ball. At that time such balls were very popular in Moscow and St. Petersburg in winter. After some hesitation, Tanya decided to go. There my aunt danced one or two dances. Then she slipped and fell. She had a heart attack. She was carried to one of the side rooms, but as soon as they got there, she was dead.

Some information about Elisabeth Molas is given in the memoirs of Galina von Meck: the companion was half Spanish and half German. Molas was born into a family of naval officers and was well acquainted with the Tchaikovskys. It was the Tchaikovsky brothers who recommended her to the Davydovs. Molas remained with Tatiana Davydova until her death.

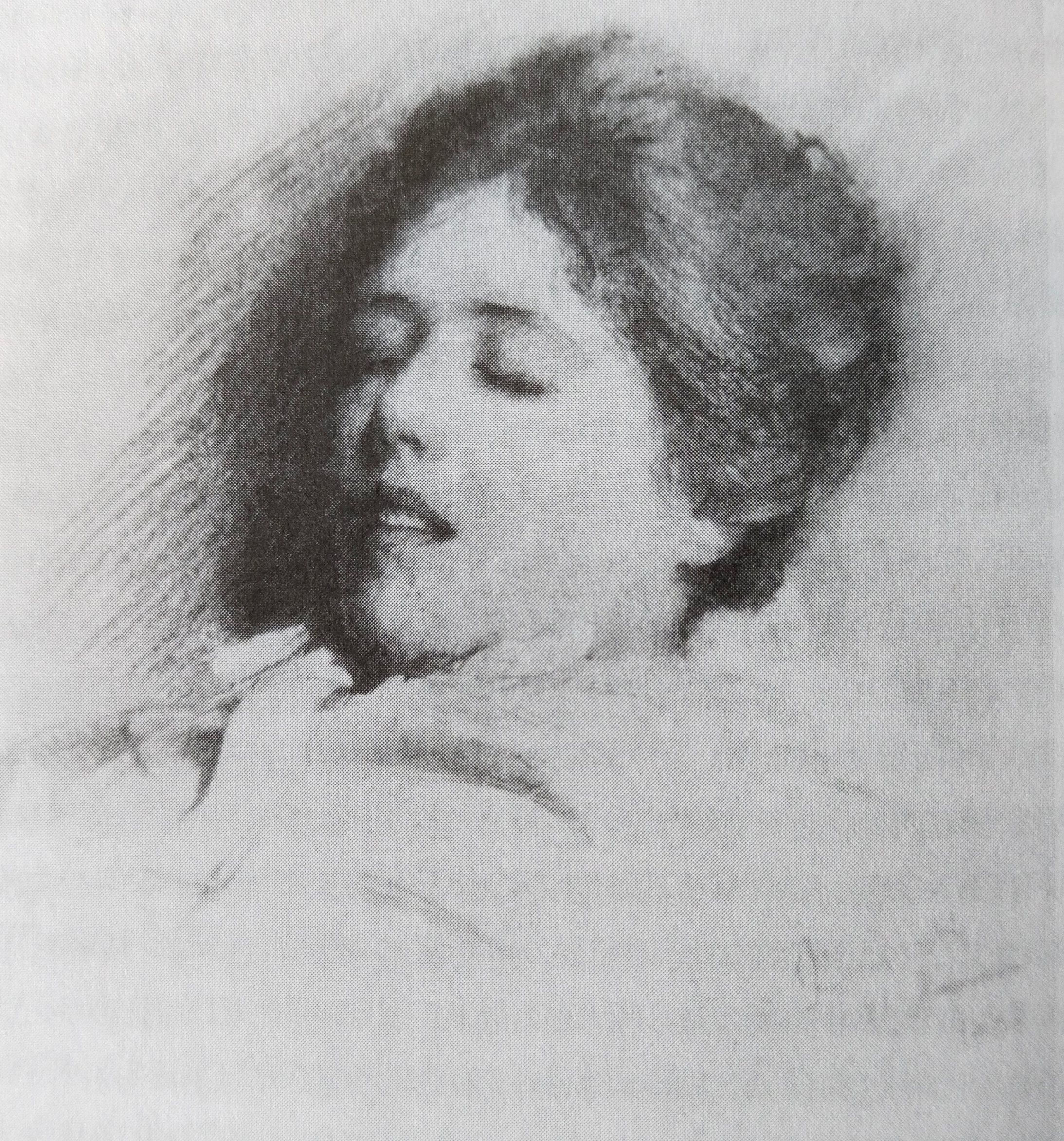
Jan Cionglinski. Tatiana Davydova on her death bed, 1887.

Nadezhda von Meck wrote that Tatiana "died with a smile on her face". Pyotr Ilyich openly mentioned morphine as the cause of his niece's death in his letters: "She was cured there of morphinomania, but soon returned to the drug and finally poisoned herself with it", "for this unfortunate person the best and most desirable result was death, but nevertheless I was deeply shocked by the news ... her body had long been broken. It was a shadow of the old Tanya; the morphine had ruined her, and one way or another the tragic result was inevitable".

The family originally planned to hold the funeral in the Kiev Governorate (as Sokolov assumed, in Kamianka). But certain circumstances forced the parents to change their decision. Tatiana Davydova was buried in the cemetery of the Alexander Nevsky Lavra in St. Petersburg, in the "tent" of the Dukhovskaya Church, but the grave has not been preserved. Above the tomb in a marble frame was originally a copy of Murillo's Madonna, commissioned by the famous artist Jan Ciaglinski. The funeral cost 745 rubles, which were deposited in the church treasury by Nikolai Tchaikovsky.

== Pyotr Tchaikovsky and Tatiana Davydova ==
The composer's biographer Valery Sokolov wrote about Tatyana Davydova's role in Pyotr Ilyich Tchaikovsky's life:

Tatyana's life at a certain stage became the object of Tchaikovsky's increased attention and many of his contradictory experiences. The painful scope of these experiences, along with his constant worries about his sister's poor health, proved to be the main "filling" of the emotional side of the composer's life during the Kamianka period, especially between 1880 and 1884. The niece was destined to become one of Pyotr Ilyich's deep emotional wounds and even "ulcers," the scars of which remained for a very long time.

Sokolov noted that Tatiana, as well as her brother Vladimir, were at the center of Tchaikovsky's attention from early childhood. Subsequently, Vladimir became the composer's true fan and "model". On the contrary, Tatyana was increasingly criticized by Tchaikovsky as time went on. Pyotr Ilyich was a direct witness of the formation of the girl's personality, and in his childhood years he took part in her upbringing, later he tried to take part in solving her "adult" problems. Tatiana was for a long time one of the most frequently mentioned "characters" in his correspondence.

Sokolov distinguished several areas of the composer's statements about his niece. One is Tchaikovsky's open admiration for Tatyana's talents, intelligence, kindness, and love for those close to her. The other is his equally sharp condemnation of the girl's laziness, selfishness, moral promiscuity, unscrupulousness, and, above all, her abuse of morphine, which caused irreversible changes in her psyche and physical state. A significant aspect of Tchaikovsky's thoughts and feelings on this matter was his assessment of the impact of Tatyana Davydova's fate on the condition of her mother, the composer's favorite sister. Valery Sokolov wrote that this theme was "monstrously heavy... for the composer himself — the constant observation (and even imagination) of her during the mentioned period (1880–1884) became a real 'bane' for his nervous system and mental state".

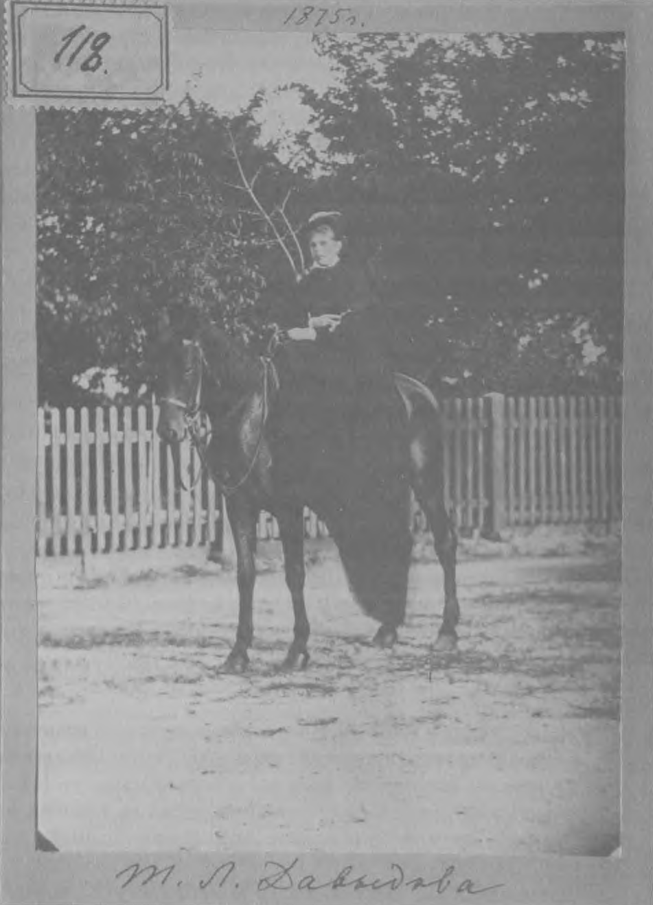
Tatiana Davydova on a horse, 1875.

Until his first visit to Kamianka in 1865, the composer had only seen the girl in photographs sent to him by her parents and judged her growth based on stories from his relatives. Sokolov noted with irony that, at this time, his attention to the girl was limited to "kisses from my side to my kind niece". One of the photographs of the girl with her mother, "stolen," according to him, by Tchaikovsky from Alexei Davydov, was a constant object of the composer's attention. Sokolov assumed that Tchaikovsky's interactions with his niece during his visits to Kamianka included, in addition to games and walks, "piano lessons with four-handed playing".

As Tatiana Davydova grew older, she became closer to Modest Tchaikovsky and more distant from Pyotr Ilyich. Sokolov noted that a comparison of Tatiana's letters to the Tchaikovsky brothers reveals a fundamental difference in her attitude toward the addressees: "With the younger one, love was in the first place; with the older one, respect above all". At the same time, he quotes one of his niece's letters to the composer, which includes the fragment: "My dear, priceless one, love me a little, and I love you so, so, so firmly". The researcher considered the year 1878 a turning point, when "some features of her character and behavior... began to cause him irritation and rejection," although the composer still found her "pretty and clever" and noted her artistic abilities. In turn, Tatiana wrote long letters to Tchaikovsky, in one of them asking him to send his cycle of 12 pieces, Opus 40.

The composer's attitude towards Tatiana Davydova was contradictory. Periods of estrangement alternated with moments of closeness. In a letter to his younger brother, he wrote in 1879: "She has a wonderful heart, and all her faults, her roughness, her affectivity are felt and hated by herself, but she simply does not understand what must be done in order not to be like that". Tchaikovsky noted that the girl felt unhappy. He observed the changes in her appearance ("The children have improved after measles, although they are still thin and pale. Tanya was shaved but looks very pretty"), as well as her success in mastering foreign languages and the piano, and he admired her performances on the amateur stage. Tchaikovsky stated, "Gifted with great abilities, a wonderful heart, and remarkable beauty, [Tatiana] suffers from one rather obnoxious disadvantage—she is eternally and always bored. Her character is somehow broken, full of painful doubts and distrust of herself, restless, imbued with premature disappointment".

In June–August 1880, Tchaikovsky composed Six Vocal Duets (Op. 46), dedicated to Tatiana Davydova. Tchaikovsky's duets vary in style. Tears, In the Vegetable Garden Near the Ford, Passion Has Passed, and Dawn are filled with deep feeling and touch the listener with their lyricism. In contrast, Evening is a musical piece of an illustrative and descriptive character with declamatory turns, while Scottish Ballad is a dramatic dialogue. The work on the cycle began in Kamianka and continued at the estates of Nadezhda von Meck, in Brailov and Simaki. The cycle was first published by Pyotr Jurgenson in 1881. The autograph of the Six Vocal Duets is now in the Tchaikovsky House-Museum in Klin (f. 88, No. 129). Books from the composer's personal library have also survived, from which he studied the poems that formed the basis of the duets. Two duets from this cycle were later reworked for duet and orchestra: the duet Tears was arranged by Sergei Taneyev (this score has never been published and exists only in manuscript), and the duet Dawn was arranged by Pyotr Ilyich himself (this score has also not been published). Most of the duets are for soprano and mezzo-soprano, but one duet (No. 2) is for soprano and baritone.

American musicologist Roland John Wiley based on an analysis of the text of the poems underlying the duets, concluded as follows:

In composing the cycle, Tchaikovsky alluded to the difficulties in the fate of Tatiana Davydova herself: night brings relief from the cares of the day (No. 1), inconsolable sadness (No. 3), the girl suffers from the arrogance of the young man (No. 4), love has passed, but a return to the serene past is no longer possible (No. 5), admiration for nature and prayer (No. 6). The only duet that does not fit into the overall scheme, in Wiley's view, is No. 2 (the father's blood on the son's hands). Wiley also noted that the composer himself pointed out that this particular duet should be recited rather than sung. The cycle clearly traces the sequence of the times of day to which the duets are dedicated — from Evening (No. 1) to Dawn (No. 6).

The closeness between Pyotr Ilyich and Tatiana in 1881 is illustrated by a letter to him from his brother Anatoly, who wrote: "From her own words I know that you are almost the only person who can have an influence on her". The composer himself, however, noted, "If I were asked what is the worst torture in the world, I would say: to spend two evening hours in Tanya's company... within five minutes [she] will perform 100 senseless and aimless actions and utter 400 incoherent thoughts, scraps of thoughts, memories, or just some nonsense". He wrote with regret that he begins to be more angry at Tatiana than pity her, notes her "selfishness, heartlessness, weakness of character," resents that "a healthy girl, out of characterlessness, out of caprice, to spite herself and others voluntarily ruin themselves, like a drunkard, drinking inebriated". Tchaikovsky suggested that the sister's painful condition was caused by anxiety for Tatiana. The composer concluded, "My nerves are terribly shaken, and I will simply be forced to leave here [Kamianka] soon, at least for a while, so as not to fall ill myself". He saw only one way out in solving the problems of his niece — her marriage: "Only serious duties around her husband and children can excite in her the desire to take care of her health". Pyotr Ilyich organized the delivery of Tatiana Davydova in Paris and her drug treatment at the hospital of Charcot's assistant, Dr. N. Pascal. Charcot personally examined the patient. She was treated by reducing the dose of morphine and using opium.

The condition of the patient was grave: Tatiana "screamed, tore her hair, incessantly fainted, delirious, in a word, it was something so terrible that I do not know how I endured this impression", wrote the composer to Nadezhda von Meck. In response to a letter from Anatoly Tchaikovsky, who used the expression "your Tanya", the composer wrote in irritation that he was ready to help Tatiana and be useful to her, but flatly refused to consider her his own, noting that he had recently felt fear in relation to her. Tatiana's stay in the hospital, the payment of a maid, and a separate nurse forced Tchaikovsky to ask Nadezhda von Meck for additional financial assistance, and his publisher Pyotr Jurgenson for a loan of 2,000 rubles. Von Meck sent 5,000 rubles. Tchaikovsky was disappointed with the methods of treatment and wrote that, instead of morphine, Tatiana was simply becoming accustomed to other drugs. He explained her severe condition not as a result of addiction but as the "fatal properties of this girl", expressing a desire only to "be away" from Tatiana and making plans to leave the capital of France. Poznansky claimed that Pyotr Ilyich employed a special tactic in his dealings with Tatiana and other representatives of the Davydov family: he pretended not to notice anything, thereby trying not to aggravate the situation. The Davydovs, in turn, were aware of the composer's pretense and were grateful to him for it. To these problems was added the rapid deterioration of Tatiana's eyesight.

The composer took care of the paperwork, the baptism of the child born to Tatiana Davydova, as well as the issue of arranging for the child's feeding and upbringing. Dr. Ferre performed the Catholic rite of baptism. Tatiana's maid Sasha and the composer became godparents, with Tchaikovsky flatly refusing to call himself a Catholic. According to the composer, Ferre conducted the rite "unusually swaggeringly" and then "sat at Tanya's bedside, holding her hand and looking at her in love". The boy was given the name Georgy-Léon or Georgy. He was very much liked by the composer, who even made plans to adopt him for a while. Tchaikovsky arranged for the boy to be cared for by a nurse who lived outside Paris. Tchaikovsky wrote with dismay that the mother was not much impressed by the parting with her son; she also thought little of the trouble she had caused the family. However, the composer did not condemn his niece, drawing from his own experience of sin.

External videos
- | Pyotr Tchaikovsky. Six Vocal Duets (Op. 46). Performed by Alexandra Ogaryova (soprano), Tatiana Rubinskaya (mezzo-soprano), Tatiana Afanasievskaya (piano)

The composer's treatment of Tatiana had become sharply negative by March 1885. In a letter to his brother Modest, he wrote: "I cannot see her without malice and disgust". In the summer of that year, Tchaikovsky planned to move Georgy to his homeland, but Tatiana opposed this, hinting at some change in her own destiny that would allow her to take over the boy's upbringing herself. Valery Sokolov believed she was referring to Nikolai Tchaikovsky's decision to adopt Georgy, which Tatiana had presumably already learned about. In August 1885, the composer's older brother and his wife traveled to Paris specifically to meet the boy. John Roland Wiley, however, wrote: "The circumstances of Georgy-Léon's adoption remain mysterious". In February, Tchaikovsky coordinated the financial matters connected with the adoption and allocated 500 rubles for it. In June, the plans were disrupted at Tatiana's initiative, who requested to keep the child in France for another year. Tchaikovsky prepared to suspend the adoption process already underway, but in August, his brother Nicholas arrived in Paris. Wiley assumed that the child's return to Russia the following June was against the mother's will.

Pyotr Ilyich's meetings with his niece became increasingly rare. The last of them took place in September 1886 in Moscow at the house of Anna von Meck and in October–November of the same year in St. Petersburg. He stated, "Tania has terribly lost weight, but is perfectly healthy". The composer took the news of her death hard: "This morning I received one sad piece of news (the unexpected death of my niece, a young beautiful girl), which has so shaken me that the pen is falling from my hands and that even about yesterday, which constitutes an epoch in my life, (Note: It is about the premiere of the opera Cherevichki in Moscow.) I find it difficult to speak. All my thoughts have gone to the place where the terrible misfortune occurred". Tchaikovsky, along with his Moscow relatives, attended the funeral service for Tatiana.

In early February, Tchaikovsky learned that a posthumous drawing of his niece had been made. He ordered a copy of it for himself. The portrait of the deceased was created by the artist Jan Cionglinski. A copy of it is now in Tchaikovsky's study in his House-Museum in Klin.

== Georgy Nikolayevich Tchaikovsky ==
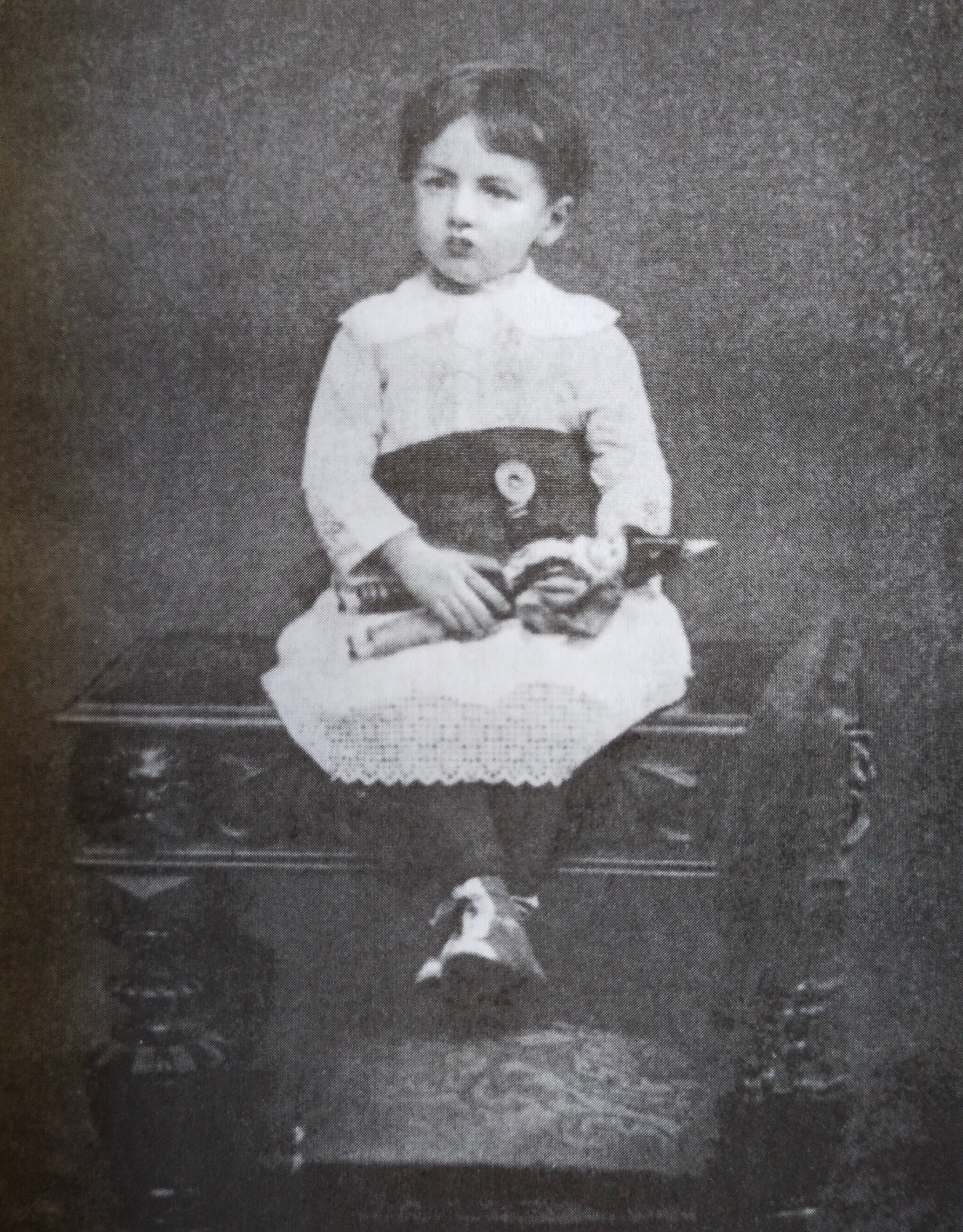
Georgy Tchaikovsky in 1886.

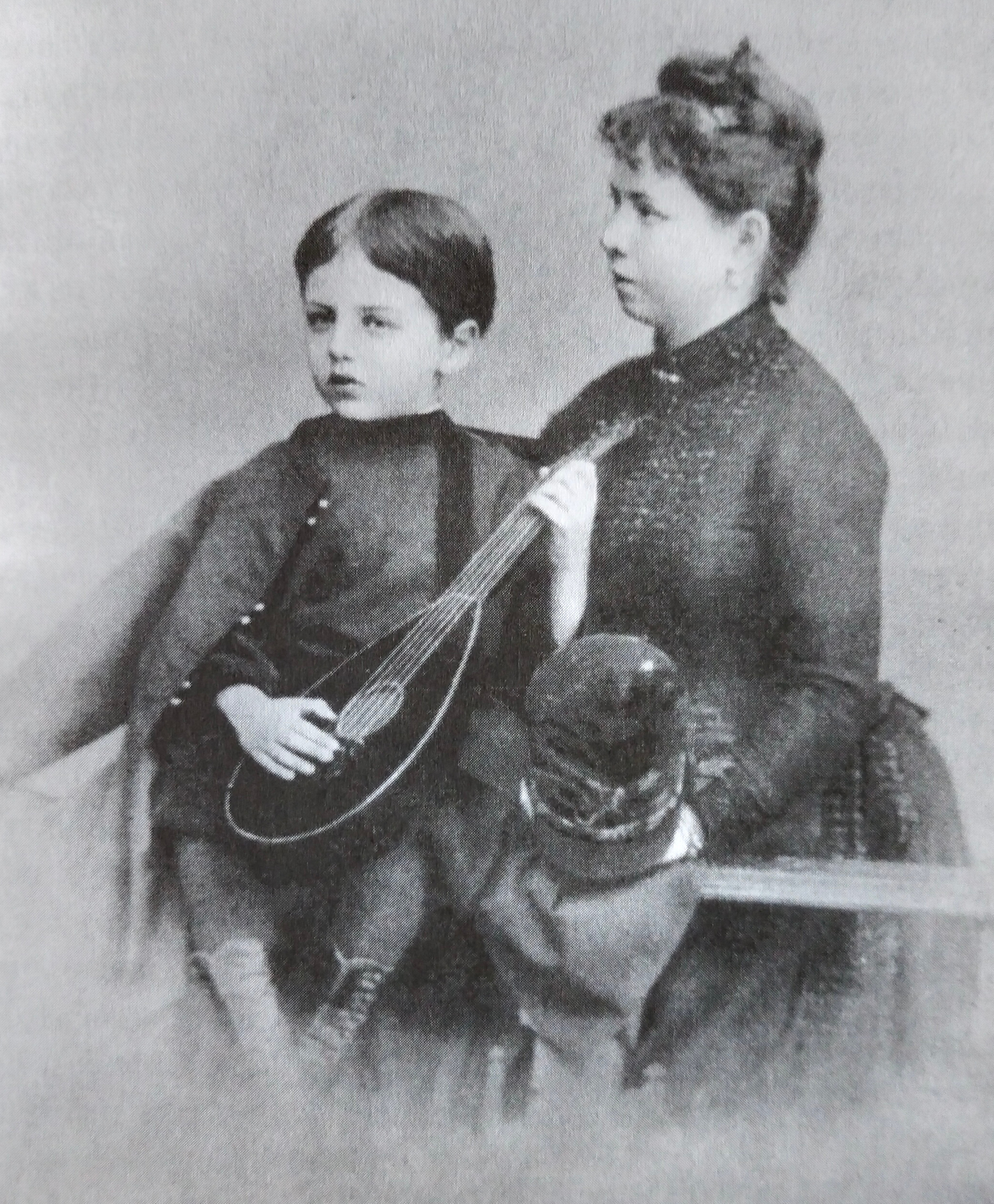
Georgy Nikolayevich with his step-mother, 1886.

In France, Georgy was raised by the Auclair family in Villeneuve, south of Paris. He spent the first three years of his life there. Tchaikovsky visited him when he came to Paris, and grudgingly noted the boy's resemblance to his supposed father, Blumenfeld, although he felt sympathy for the child. Later, Tchaikovsky took an active part in his fate. In particular, in his will, the composer provided for the boy's material well-being.

Lydia Konisskaya claimed that Davydov senior did not know about the existence of her grandson for a long time. The secret was revealed by chance. Lev Davydov declared to Nikolai Tchaikovsky: "Oh, how I don't like this Frenchman of yours!", the composer's younger brother, Major General in the Admiralty, Hippolyte Tchaikovsky, who was present, carelessly replied: "How can you not love him, he is your grandson!" By this time Tatiana was long dead. Ippolit himself did not learn the secret of the boy's adoption at once. Pyotr Ilyich noted in one of his letters: "Hippolyte visited Nikolai Ilyich and several times noted with surprise that Zh[orzh] looked like Tanya, but did not suspect anything". In turn, John Roland Wiley wrote that thanks to Blumenfeld's boasting about his victory in the field of love, Tatiana Davydova's pregnancy was known all over Kiev, and Alexandra actively asked her brother about Blumenfeld, although she had never been interested in him before.

Galina von Meck, who knew Georgy well in his childhood and youth, claimed that Georgy knew that Tatiana was his real mother (the composer's English biographer Anthony Holden claimed that Tatiana Davydova visited him regularly after he was adopted by Tchaikovsky). Her portrait was always on her son's desk. He studied in Moscow and became a mining engineer. Georgy married a girl who was also illegitimate. They had a son. The family emigrated to Italy after the October Revolution.

Valery Sokolov described Georgi's fate differently: After World War I, Georgi and his wife Elena Vladimirovna (adopted daughter of Olga Mikhailovna Golovinskaya) emigrated to Yugoslavia. They originally lived in the town of Trebinje (now in Bosnia and Herzegovina near Dubrovnik, where they later moved). Georgy Tchaikovski was listed as a technician for the Ministry of Railways in Zemun, near Belgrade. He died in this town on February 16, 1940, and was buried in the New Cemetery in Belgrade.

== Historiography ==
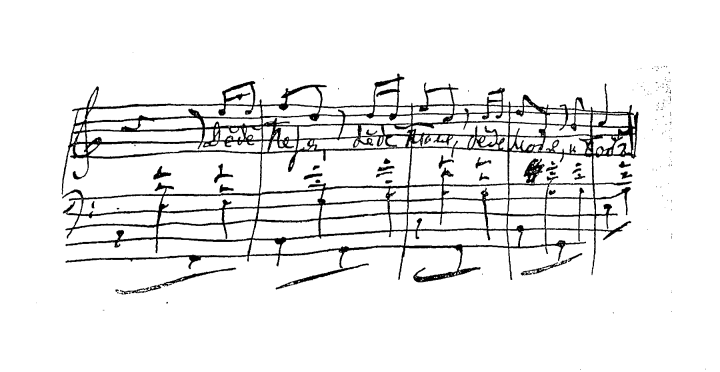
Tchaikovsky's letter to Vladimir Davydov with the theme of a salon polka dedicated to Georgy Tchaikovsky dated April 15, 1893.

Valery Sokolov wrote that Tatyana Davydova's biography "can be traced through the composer's letters to various addressees." Her own letters to relatives, as well as her mother's letters to Pyotr and Modest Tchaikovsky regarding Tatiana's fate, have also survived. They contain descriptions of both the early and the most dramatic events of the girl's life. Some details of her life can be found in the correspondence of Nikolai and Anatoly Tchaikovsky. There are few of Tatiana's letters to Pyotr Ilyich — only for the years 1878–1881. The international site of researchers of Tchaikovsky's biography and work, Tchaykovsky Society, states that only two letters from Tchaikovsky to Tatiana Davydova, dated 1878 and 1881, have survived: Letter 937 of October 10, 1878, from St. Petersburg (which discusses the relationship between Tatiana and Anatoly Tchaikovsky, as well as the impact of the death of his brother on the mental state of Pyotr Ilyich's friend, Aleksey Apukhtin, and is in the National Library of Russia, f. 834, ed. xr. 18, л. 1-2), and Letter 1702 of March 4, 1881, from Naples (where Tchaikovsky talks about his stay in Italy and plans for the future, and which is in the National Library of Russia, f. 834, xr. 18, fol. 3-4). In the archives of the Tchaikovsky State House-Museum, there are 9 letters from Tatyana Davydova to the composer, dated 1878 and 1879.

Among memoirists, the most detailed accounts of Tatiana Davydova's fate are given by her close relatives — her younger brother Yuri Davydov in his book Notes on P. I. Tchaikovsky, published in 1962, and her niece Galina von Meck in her book As I Remember Them (1973). Yuri Davydov, in particular, delicately circumvents the problem of Tatiana's abuse of morphine. He explains the girl's health problems by stating that "from too rapid mental and physical development, she began to have severe headaches that tormented her all her life". The memoirist avoids describing the real difficulties in the relationship between the composer and his niece. According to Davydov, "Pyotr Ilyich admired his niece and loved his sister very much, but he could not establish their relationship, and he himself, in turn, became irritated and suffered". Tatiana's child, according to her brother, was born in Paris from an unnamed married Russian (a Catholic by religion), who could not divorce his wife in accordance with the laws of the Russian Empire. The adoption of Georgy, according to Davydov, was carried out by Nikolai Tchaikovsky "at the urgent request" of the composer. Yuri explains his sister's death as being due to a heart attack.

Only three times does Modest Tchaikovsky recall the fate of Tatiana Davydova in his three-volume book The Life of Pyotr Ilyich Tchaikovsky (Based on Documents Kept in the Archive in Klin). Twice he mentions her death. Modest Tchaikovsky describes how he was awakened in Moscow by a telegram about Tatiana's death in the capital. He did not immediately wake up his older brother, who got up only "at the 11th hour contented, happy, and alert". The composer was grief-stricken by the unexpected news but "did not change his decision to conduct the Cherevichki two more times". He mentions Tatiana once in connection with the dedication of six duets to her, dating their creation from June 5 to July 10, 1880 (Dombaev, for example, dates them from June 4 to August 24 of the same year).

Soviet musicologists and biographers of Tchaikovsky preferred not to delve into the problems associated with Tatiana Davydova. Art historian Andrei Budyakovsky mentions Tatiana Davydova's name quite often in his book The Life of Pyotr Ilyich Tchaikovsky, created at the turn of the 1930s and 1940s but published only in 2003. He summarizes the events of 1883 as follows: Tatiana refuses suitors "right and left," but falls in love with Blumenfeld. In Paris, she gives birth to a son, Georgy, and "Tchaikovsky, who saw a significant share of his guilt in the fact that he allowed his niece to do this, managed to hide what had happened from his parents". The composer took the child into his care, but this story "poisoned his fascination with his favorite city and ... had a detrimental effect on his mental health and his work".

Local historian Lydia Konisskaya, in her book Tchaikovsky in St. Petersburg (1969 and 1974 editions), limits herself with regard to Tatiana to an abridged retelling of Yuri Davydov's notes, but cites fragments from the composer's diary that testify to Pyotr Ilyich's sympathy for Georgy, Tatiana Davydova's son: "G. was charming in his balakhonchik. He was clever and patient. In the font he cried very much... Georgy was very pleased with the toys, especially the soldiers entering the fortress. Left secretly from him, avoiding tears". From entries in Tchaikovsky's diary and from his letter to his brother Modest, it is known that the child was baptized again, this time in an Orthodox church. Russian philologist Boris Anshakov, in his biographical essay The Tchaikovsky Brothers (1981), tells the story of Tatiana Davydova's childbirth in Paris and the adoption of her son in a chapter dedicated to his adoptive father, Nikolai Ilyich Tchaikovsky.

The emigrant writer and biographer Nina Berberova only mentions Tatiana Davydova in passing in her widely acclaimed essay Tchaikovsky. At the same time, in one sentence, she offers two interpretations of events, contradicting the widespread belief of researchers: "The grandson of N. F. von Meck, Adam Karlovich Benigsen, son of the eldest daughter of Nadezhda Filaretovna, who invited me to his house several times and talked to me — not about Tchaikovsky, whom he could not know, but about the von Meck family, about his uncle, who had squandered the von Meck millions, and about another who had married Tchaikovsky's niece, Anna Davydova, the sister of Tanya, whom P. I. I. loved so much and who secretly gave birth to an illegitimate son by Felix Blumenfeld, a famous pianist and conservatory professor of his time [according to all other researchers, the protagonist of the drama is another Blumenfeld, Stanislav], and soon committed suicide [no one else describes this version of events]".

Doctor of Art History and Professor at the National Pedagogical Drahomanov University in Kiev, Galina Poberezhnaya, in her biography of Tchaikovsky published in 1994, does not mention specific events in the life of Tatiana Davydova. However, discussing the images of strong women in the composer's works, she writes: "A bright trace in the memory and soul of the composer was left by his niece Tatiana Davydova — an outstanding, tragic personality. Female love, as the supreme embodiment of the idea of life and the inevitability of death, received in her fate a real, not conventional-theatrical, embodiment".

According to ballet critic Pavel Yashchenko, who undertook an analysis of Tchaikovsky's ballet The Nutcracker, the Davydovs' estate in Kamianka "was transformed in the composer's mind into a childish utopian realm of sweet Confiturenburg, where the owner of the estate, the composer's sister Alexandra Ilyinichna, was a magnanimous queen, her daughter Tatiana, who had died five years before her, was Clara, and his 'idol'... Bob 'prince-lover'". The very 'kingdom of Confiturenburg', where the main characters of The Nutcracker find themselves, is akin to some kind of narcotic vision, which, from his point of view, correlates with the Davydov family's fascination with morphine.

In 2021, Russian composer and music historian Valery Sokolov dedicated a large (110-page) article, "Tatiana Davydova in the Life of P. I. Tchaikovsky," to Tatiana Davydova in the collection of scientific publications St. Petersburg Musical Archive, which was dedicated to Tchaikovsky and published under the patronage of the Tchaikovsky Society. In this article, he reconstructed the girl's biography and attempted to determine the role of her problems in the composer's life and work. Sokolov distinguished two stages in Tatiana Davydova's life: the prosperous (until 1879) and the "dramatic" (1879–1887). Tatiana Davydova also became one of the main characters in the second volume of American historian Alexander Poznansky's book Pyotr Tchaikovsky: A Biography. The book published rare photographs of the girl. Tatiana Davydova occupies a significant place in the monographs of another American researcher, John Roland Wiley, as well as British musicologist David Brown.

== Cultural representations ==
The episodic role of little Tatiana Davydova in the film The Music Lovers (1971) by British director Ken Russell was played by his daughter Victoria.

Tatiana Davydova was a supporting actress in the film Apocrypha: Music for Pyotr and Paul, directed by Russian director Adel Al-Hadad in 2004. The role of Tatiana was played by actress Alina Bulynko, in the movie she is much younger than her prototype. According to the plot, the composer, returning from Vienna in 1878, visited his sister Alexandra Davydova at her husband's estate in Kamianka. The first performance of the composer's new work Handsome Joseph was to take place in the local church. Households and villagers eagerly await the premiere, but the performance unexpectedly ends in failure. The screenwriter Yuri Arabov significantly changed a real episode from the composer's life (described in detail by the British researcher David Brown), which he himself told in a letter to Nadezhda von Meck. In fact, Good-looking Joseph is not the Tchaikovsky's work, but a troparion arranged by Bortnyansky, which the composer decided to perform as a regent. The work was not performed by a church choir, as in the film, but by an amateur family quartet composed of representatives of the Davydov and Tchaikovsky families, including Tatiana. For Pyotr Ilyich, the unsuccessful performance was not a tragedy. The event itself took place not in 1878, but on April 18, 1880.

Pyotr Tchaikovsky wrote about the events of the performance of Good-looking Joseph in a letter to Nadezhda von Meck dated April 18, 1880:

Today I made my debut as a church regent. My sister wanted us to sing Good-looking Joseph when the shroud was taken out today. We got out the sheet music, formed a quartet of my sister, Tanya, Anatoly and me, and prepared this troparion arranged by Bortnyansky. The singing went well at home, but in church Tanya became confused, and after her all of us. Despite my vain efforts to restore order, I had to leave without finishing. Sister and Tanya were very upset by this incident, but on Sunday there would be a chance to make up for our shame at dinner. I undertook to learn with them the 7th Bortnyansky's Hier Cherubim and Our Father from my liturgy.

David Brown suggested that these events were the occasion for Tchaikovsky's composition of the Six Duets (op. 46).

== Bibliography ==
=== Sources ===
- Давыдов, Ю. Л. (1962). П. И. Чайковский и семья Давыдовых // Записки о П. И. Чайковском (in Russian). М.: Государственное музыкальное издательство. pp. 3–43.
- Чайковский, М. И. (1997a). Жизнь Петра Ильича Чайковского (по документам, хранившимся в архиве в Клину) в 3-х томах. Гений в искусстве (in Russian). Vol. V- 2. 1877—1884. М.: Алгоритм. p. 605. ISBN 5-88878-007-3
- Чайковский, М. И. (1997b). Жизнь Петра Ильича Чайковского (по документам, хранившимся в архиве в Клину) в 3-х томах. Гений в искусстве (in Russian). Vol. V. 3. 1885—1893. М.: Алгоритм. p. 401. ISBN 5-88878-007-3
- Чайковский, П. И. (2020). Завещание композитора // Музыкальное обозрение: Газета (in Russian). М.: Музыкальное обозрение. ISSN 2224-7025.
- Чайковский, П. И. (1966). Письмо Татьяне Давыдовой (4 марта 1881 года) // Полное собрание сочинений. Литературные произведения и переписка (in Russian). Vol. Х: Письма (1881). М.: Музыка. pp. 58–59.
- Чайковский, П. И. (1965a). Письмо Анатолию Чайковскому (7 сентября 1880 года) // Полное собрание сочинений. Литературные произведения и переписка (in Russian). Vol. IХ: Письма (1880). М.: Музыка. pp. 260–261.
- Чайковский, П. И. (1965b). Письмо к Надежде фон Мекк от 18 апреля 1880 года // Полное собрание сочинений. Литературные произведения и переписка (in Russian). Vol. IX: Письма (1880). М.: Музыка. pp. 109–110.
- Чайковский, П. И. (1962). Письмо Татьяне Давыдовой (10 октября 1878 года) // Полное собрание сочинений. Литературные произведения и переписка (in Russian). Vol. VII: Письма (1878). М.: Музыка. pp. 422–423.
- Чайковский, П. И. (1959a). Письмо Александре Давыдовой (23 октября 1861 года) // Полное собрание сочинений. Литературные произведения и переписка (in Russian). Vol. V: Письма (1848—1875). М.: Музыка. pp. 69–71.
- Чайковский, П. И. (1959b). Письмо Александре Давыдовой (4 декабря 1861 года) // Полное собрание сочинений. Литературные произведения и переписка (in Russian). Vol. V: Письма (1848—1875). М.: Музыка. pp. 71–72.
- Чайковский, П. И. (1959c). Письмо Александре Давыдовой (10 сентября 1862 года) // Полное собрание сочинений. Литературные произведения и переписка (in Russian). Vol. V. Письма (1848—1875). М.: Музыка. pp. 73–75.
- Meck, G. von (1973). The Mecks // As I Remember Them. London.: Dobson Books Ltd. pp. 29–42. ISBN 0-2347-7454-1

=== Researches and fiction ===
- Аншаков, Б. Я. (1981). Николай Ильич // Братья Чайковские. Очерк (in Russian). Ижевск.: «Удмуртия». pp. 12–22.
- Берберова, Н. Н. (1997). Чайковский (in Russian). М.: Лимбус Пресс. p. 256. ISBN 978-5-8538-8003-0.
- Будяковский, А. Е. (2003). Жизнь Петра Ильича Чайковского (in Russian). СПб.: КультИнформПресс. p. 351. ISBN 5-8392-0229-0
- Конисская, Л. М. (1974). "Чтоб музыка моя распространялась" // Чайковский в Петербурге. 2-е изд., переработанное и дополненное (in Russian). Л.: Лениздат. pp. 188–223.
- Побережная, Г. И. (1994). Изобразительный элемент в музыке П. И. Чайковского // Пётр Ильич Чайковский (in Russian). Киев: Рос. мовою. pp. 102–129. ISBN 5-8238-0156-4
- Познанский, А. Н. (2009a). Пётр Чайковский. Биография. В 2-х томах. Жизнеописания (in Russian). Vol. 2. СПб.: Вита Нова. p. 624.
- Познанский, А. Н. (2009b). Пётр Чайковский. Биография. В 2-х томах. Жизнеописания (in Russian). Vol. 1. СПб.: Вита Нова. p. 608. ISBN 978-5-9389-8229-1.
- Познанский, А. Н. (2011). Чайковский в Петербурге (in Russian). СПб.: Композитор. p. 544. ISBN 978-5-7379-0445-6.
- Соколов, В. С. (1994). Антонина Чайковская. История забытой жизни (in Russian). М.: Музыка. p. 296. ISBN 978-5-7140-0565-7. ISBN 5-7140-0565-1
- Соколов, В. С. (2021). Татьяна Давыдова в жизни П. И. Чайковского // Петербургский музыкальный архив. Чайковский: сборник статей / сост. и отв. ред. Т. 3. Сквирская (in Russian). Vol. 15. СПб.: Композитор. pp. 206–317. ISBN 978-5-7379-0965-9.
- Ященков, П. (2014). Балет со следами морфия и неразделённой любви к племяннику. Часть 3 // Московский комсомолец: Газета (in Russian).
- Brown, D. (2009). Tchaikovsky. The Man and his Music. New York: Pegasus Books. p. 512. ISBN 978-1605-9801-71.
- Holden, A. (1995). Tchaikovsky. London; New York.: Bantam Press. p. 489. ISBN 9-780-5930-2468-3.
- Lanza, J. (2007). The Music Lovers // Phallic Frenzy: Ken Russell and His Films. Chicago.: Chicago Review Press. p. 363. ISBN 9-781-5697-6482-4.
- Orlova, A. A. (1990). Tchaikovsky. A self-portrait. Translated by R. M. Davison with a Foreword by David Brown. 1st edition. Oxford, New York.: Oxford University Press. p. 436. ISBN 978-0-1931-5319-6.
- Wiley, R. J. (2009). Tchaikovsky. The Master Musicians. Oxford: Oxford University Press. p. 592. ISBN 978-0195-3689-25.
- Warrack, J. H. (1973). Country Life: 1885—1887 // Tchaikovsky. New York.: C. Scribner's Sons. pp. 189–208. ISBN 978-0-684-13558-8.

=== Manuals ===
- Домбаев, Г. С. (1958). Вокальная музыка для двух голосов с фортепиано // Творчество Петра Ильича Чайковского в материалах и документах (in Russian). М.: Государственное музыкальное издательство. pp. 288–291.
