= Sofia Akimova =

Russian actress

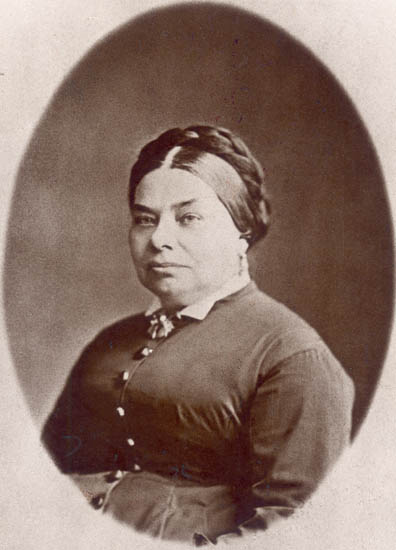
- Born: Софья Павловна Ребристова; September 1824; Moscow, Russian Empire
- Died: 16 June 1889 (aged 64); Ramenskoye, Moscow Governorate, Russian Empire
- Years active: 1846–1889

Sofia Pavlovna Akimova (Russian: Софья Павловна Акимова, née Rebristova, Ребристова; born September 1824, Moscow, Imperial Russia, – died 16 June 1889, Ramenskoye, Moscow Governorate, Imperial Russia) was a popular Russian stage actress, associated with Maly Theatre in Moscow.

Having made her debut on stage in 1846, Akimova excelled in plays by Nikolai Gogol, Denis Fonvizin, Alexander Griboyedov, but most notably Alexander Ostrovsky, including The Storm, Poverty is No Vice, A Family Affair, A Profitable Position, Enough Stupidity for Every Wise Man and An Ardent Heart. With her husband, the Maly Theatre actor (and one-time stage director) A.F. Akimov, she co-translated several French plays.
