= The Snow Maiden (play) =

Play by Alexander Ostrovsky

- Original language: Russian
- Written by: Alexander Ostrovsky
- Genre: Fairytale

Premiere
- Date: 11 May 1873
- Place: Bolshoy Theatre

The Snow Maiden (Russian: Снегурочка, Snegurochka) is a play in verse by Alexander Ostrovsky written in 1873 and first published in the September 1873 issue of Vestnik Evropy. It was adapted into an opera of the same name by Nikolai Rimsky-Korsakov, which premièred in 1882.

== Background ==
The idea of the play based on a fairytale about Snegurochka came to Ostrovsky in his Shchelykovo estate, the place he admired and almost worshipped, imagining it as a piece of wonderland here on Earth, saturated with the spirit of Old Rus with its heroic warriors and gentle, benevolent tsars. The play tells the story of an idyllic utopian kingdom ruled by the Berendei, a poet and an artist who believes in love, peace and good will and promotes this belief of his.

The play's plot was based on the Russian folk fairytale Ostrovsky read in the Vol. 2 of Alexander Afanasyev's book The Slavs' Views Upon Nature (1867).

== History ==
In 1873, the Malyi Theatre was closed for renovations, and its cast was performing at the Bolshoy Theatre location. The management decided to unite the actors of all Imperial theatres for one grand production, for which Ostrovsky was asked to write a play.

His work premiered on May 11, 1873 in the Bolshoy Theatre as a benefit for the actor Vasily Zhivokini. Pyotr Ilyich Tchaikovsky had written music for the play's production. It was not successful despite Ostrovsky's involvement in preparing costumes, decorations and ingenious 'magic' machinery (invented by Karl Fyodorovich Valtz).

In 1900, three theatres produced the play: the Moscow Imperial troupe (with Aleksandr Pavlovich Lensky as a director), the St. Petersburg Imperial troupe (as a benefit for the actor Konstantin Varlamov) and the Moscow Art Theatre (set to music by Alexander Gretchaninov, and directed by Konstantin Stanislavski and Alexander Sanin). In the Saint Petersburg's Alexandrinsky Theatre the play was first performed on December 27, 1900, as a benefit for the actor Konstantin Varlamov.

In 1881 Nikolay Rimsky-Korsakov wrote The Snow Maiden, an opera based on Ostrovsky's play. It was premiered on January 29, 1882, in Saint Petersburg; at the Bolshoy in Moscow it was first performed on January 26, 1893.

== Reception ==
The play took everybody by surprise; a fairytale just couldn't be expected from an author known as a satirical realist specializing in social commentary.

One of Ostrovsky's old-time detractors, the novelist Grigory Danilevsky wrote to Alexey Suvorin: "If there is something that deserves scolding, it's Snegurka by Ostrovsky. Each page just asks to be parodied, it is insufferably tedious. Raw heap of folk songs, bits of Slovo o Polku Igoreve and even from A.Tolstoy and Mei... Nekrasov had sense enough: despite his friendship with Ostrovsky, he read half of the play and returned it, saying: Boring!"

Even the sympathizers of Ostrovsky were taken aback, Leo Tolstoy among them. When the two met, Ostrovsky tried to justify himself, arguing that "even Shakespeare had fairytales alongside serious plays," citing A Midsummer Night's Dream to prove his point.

Nikolay Nekrasov, then the editor of Otechestvennye Zapiski, has been perplexed by the play. As Ostrovsky submitted the play to him for the first time, he responded with a letter (the business-like tone of which the author took as an offence) implying that only a modest fee for it could be offered. "I am your regular contributor, I enter the new direction with this work, expecting from you either advice or encouragement, and what do I get? A rather dry letter in which you evaluate my new work which is so dear to me, as cheap as none of my plays had never been assessed," Ostrovsky replied.

Vexed, Ostrovsky gave The Snow Maiden to Vestnik Evropy, still assuring Nekrasov that he was not meaning to sever ties with him. "I find no reason to depart from the magazine which I sympathize a lot," he added.

Unlike most of the literary men, the Russian musical community loved the play. It took Tchaikovsky just three weeks to write the music for the play's production. Several years later Rimsky-Korsakov wrote an operatic version, using the author's text as a libretto.

Decades later Marina Tsvetayeva praised the play's language, calling it "exemplary".
