= Anna Aleeva-Stecker =

Russian playwright

Anna Aleeva-Steker
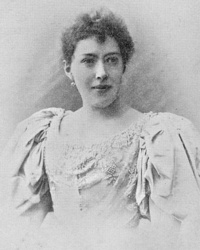
- Born: Anna Alekseeva; 15 November 1866; Moscow, Russian Empire
- Died: 1 May 1936 (aged 69)
- Occupation: Actress

Anna Sergeevna Aleeva-Steker (real name – Alekseeva, married – Steker) (November 15, 1866, Moscow – May 1, 1936, Moscow) – Russian Actor. Sister of K. S. Stanislavsky.

== Early life ==
She was a student and partner of K. S. Stanislavsky in the Alekseevsky circle and the Society of Art and Literature.

== Career ==
From 1899 to 1903 she played in the troupe of the Moscow Art Theatre. She performed under the pseudonym Aleeva-Steker.

She played on the stage of the Moscow Art Theatre:

• Maria Godunova in The Death of Ivan the Terrible by A. K. Tolstoy,

• Hannu in "Gannel" by Hauptmann,

• Elena the Beautiful and Spring (once) in Alexander Ostrovsky's The Snow Maiden and other roles.

In the post-revolutionary years she worked in amateur circles in the countryside. She taught rhythm.

She left the theatre due to domestic circumstances.
