= Konstantin Varlamov =

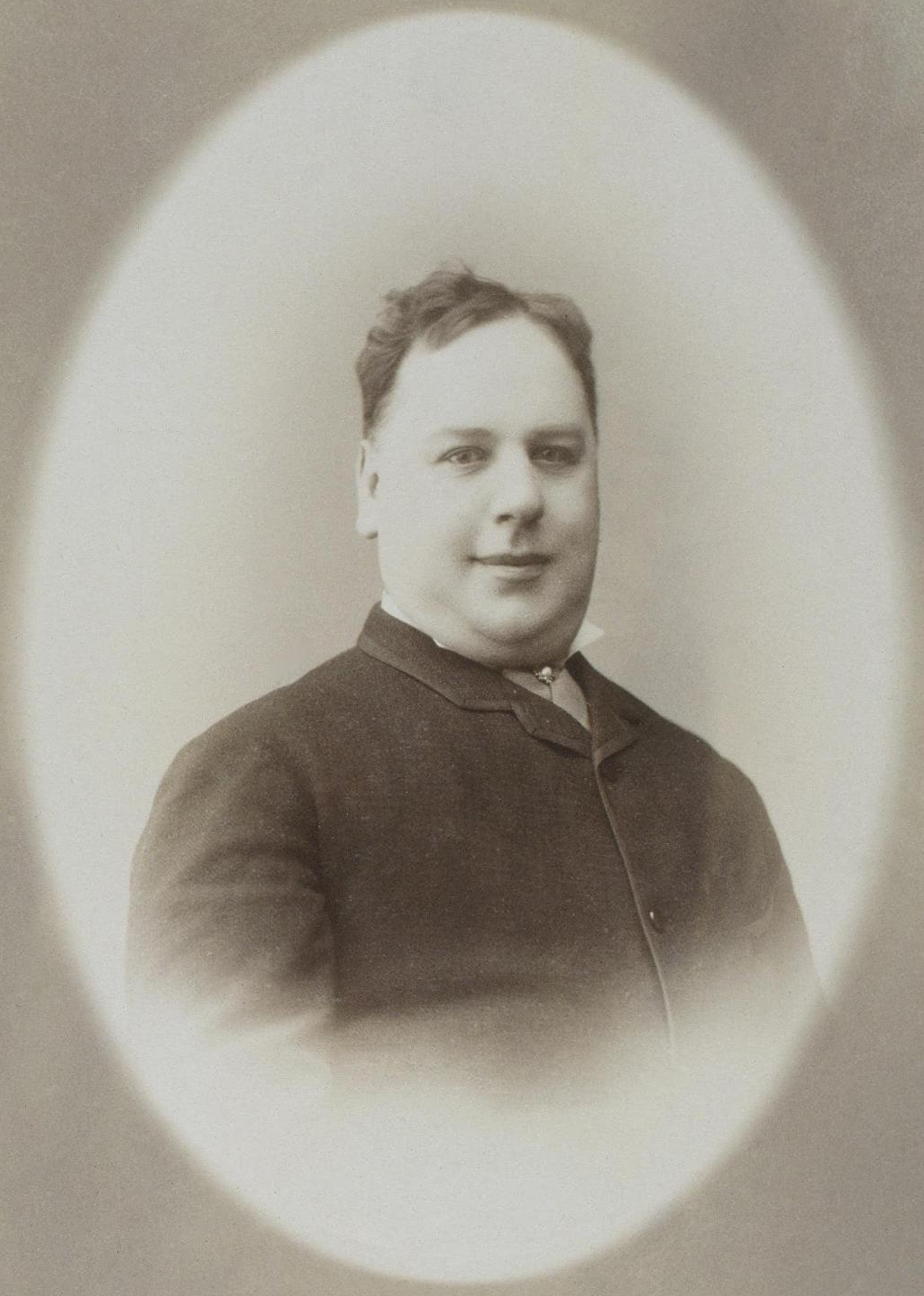
- Varlamov in the 1870s
- Born: Константин Александрович Варламов; 23 May 1848; Moscow, Russian Empire
- Died: 15 August 1915 (aged 67); Petrograd, Russian Empire
- Occupation: stage actor

Konstantin Alexandrovich Varlamov (Russian: Константин Александрович Варламов, 23 May 1848 – 15 August 1915) was an actor from the Russian Empire associated with the Alexandrinsky Theatre.

Konstantin Varlamov was born in Saint Petersburg, Imperial Russia, to the composer Alexander Varlamov. In the course of his thirty-year career with the Alexandrinsky Theatre, he played more than one thousand parts (640 of them leads); among his best-remembered roles were Varravin (The Case, by Aleksandr Sukhovo-Kobylin), Yaichnitsa (The Marriage), Lyapkin-Tyapkin (Revizor) and Chichikov (Dead Souls), all by Nikolai Gogol; Bolshov (Family Affair), Yusov (A Profitable Position), Rusakov (Stay in Your Own Sled), Krutitsky (Enough Stupidity in Every Wise Man) and Kuroslepov (An Ardent Heart), all by Alexander Ostrovsky; Lebedev (Ivanov) by Anton Chekhov; and Skalozub (Woe from Wit) by Alexander Griboyedov.

Varlamov, who regularly staged popular 'kapustniks' (amateur comedy performances) in his own home, was considered the heir to Yakov Shumsky and Vasily Zhivokini, and was a cult figure in his native city, where special trademark Dyadya Kostya cigarettes were produced at one time in his honour.

In 1896 he was honored with the medal for Meritorious Artist of the Imperial Theaters. Konstantin Varlamov died in Petrograd, Imperial Russia, on 15 August 1915 and is interred in Novodevichy Cemetery.
