= An Ardent Heart =

Play by Alexander Ostrovsky

- Written by: Aleksander Ostrovsky
- Original language: Russian
- Subject: Domestic despotism
- Genre: comedy

Premiere
- Date premiered: 15 January 1869
- Place premiered: Maly Theatre in Moscow

An Ardent Heart (Russian: Горячее сердце, romanized: Goryacheye serdtse; also translated as Burning Heart) is a play by Alexander Ostrovsky written in 1858 and first published in the January 1869 issue of Otechestvennye Zapiski. It was premiered on 15 January 1869, at the Moscow's Maly Theatre and then on 29 January at the Saint Petersburg's Alexandrinsky Theatre.

== History ==
"I am now working upon a new large play which will be finished in November," Ostrovsky wrote to his friend, the Alexandrinka actor Fyodor Burdin in October 1869. Once it was over, the dramatist sent the copy to Otechestvennye Zapisky magazine which published it in the No.1, January 1869 issue.

Burdin, as usual, has taken it upon himself to see the play through the censorship routine. To play it safe, he's left his own inscription upon the title page: "The action here takes place 30 years ago." On January 4, 1869, the comedy was licensed by the Imperial Theatres of Russia. On January 15 it premiered at the Maly Theatre, as a benefit for Prov Sadovsky, who played Kuroslepov. It also featured Sofia Akimova (as Matryona Kharitonovna), Glikeriya Fedotova (Parasha), Aleksandr Fedotov (Silan), Vasily Zhivokini (Gradoboyev), Vladimir Dmitrevsky (Khlynov), Sergey Shumsky (Aristarkh), Dmitry Zhivokini (Narkis), Nikolai Muzil (Gavrila), Mikhail Tretyakov-Strelsky (Vasya the Quick One), Konstantin Konstantinov (Landlord), Nikolai Nikiforov (Sidorenko).

There were conflicting reports as to the play's reception at Maly. According to several Moscow newspapers (among them Sovremennaya Letopis), it flopped. Several years later Ostrovsky wrote: "Newspapers reported that... An Ardent Heart had no success in Moscow but those reports were obviously false. The play was getting more and more successful crescendo-like with each and every. Being ill, I could see only the 12th or 13th performance, don't remember exactly which, and how did the public react? Actors Sadovsky, Fedotova, Muzil, Zhivokini, Dmitrevsky, Shuysky, Akimova were being called up after each act and occasionally even after certain scenes. After the curtain the whole cast come up on stage several times to be greeted by the audience. What sort of 'flop' that was?" Leo Tolstoy who saw the performance on January 17, in a letter back home called it 'excellent'.

On 15 January 1869 An Ardent Heart was performed in Saint Petersburg's Alexandrinsky Theatre, as Yulia Linskaya's benefit (she played Matryona Kharitonovna), featuring Pavel Vasilyev (Kuroslepov), Yelena Struyskaya (Parasha), Pyotr Zubrov (Silan), Vasily Samoylov (Gradoboyev), Fyodor Burdin (Khlynov), Nikolai Zubov (Aristarkh), Ivan Gorbunov (Narkis), Nikolai Sazonov (Vasya the Quick One). Ostrovsky was greatly upset with this performance. "For someone who's never known what failure was, experiencing it for the first time is tragedy. This grievance hit me for the first time in 1869 in Saint Petersburg, where An Ardent Heart premiered... Now I think it would have been much better for this play never to appear on the Petersburg stage... They proved to be completely ignorant there about what the 'folk drama' genre was about, and the production... was so negligent and incompetent, it wouldn't have been recognized at all by those who'd seen the play [in Moscow]," he later wrote.

According to The Society of Russian Dramatists, in 1874-1886 the play was missing from the two major cities theatres' respective repertoires but enjoyed more than 30 productions in the province. In 1887-1917 it was produced all in all 196 times. In 1893 the Alexandrinsky Theatre revived the play and this time had success with it. In 1948 actor Yury Yuriev wrote in his memoirs:

I left the theatre positively shaken. Whichever character you'd take, presented an open book of human life, and this time the actors' ensemble was exemplary. Sanina, Varlamov, Davydov, Medvedev, Shapovalenko all together reconstructed this 'realm of darkness', a brutal force of despotism which made us all wince with horror. Everyday routines, stale customs, this whole way of life hung like a dark heavy cloud over an ardent heart, smothering rays of light, making it impossible for a living being to break through this web of harsh reality. The play had enormous success. Even now our theatre's veterans remember it as something close to perfection, the finest moment in the Aleksandrinka's history. The Tchaikovskys were present too. During the break Pyotr Ilych, passing by, said to me: "Isn't it lovely? What a performance. Ostrovsky's every work is pure gold."

An Ardent Heart was successfully revived by several Soviet theatres. The 1926 Moscow Art Theatre's production was considered to be one of the best, with actors like Ivan Moskvin (Khlynov), Mikhail Tarkhanov (Gradoboyev), Vladimir Gribunin (Kuroslepov), Boris Dobronravov (Narkis), Nikolai Khmelyov (Silan) and Faina Shevchenko (Matryona) involved.
