= Aleksandr Varlamov (composer, born 1801) =

Russian composer

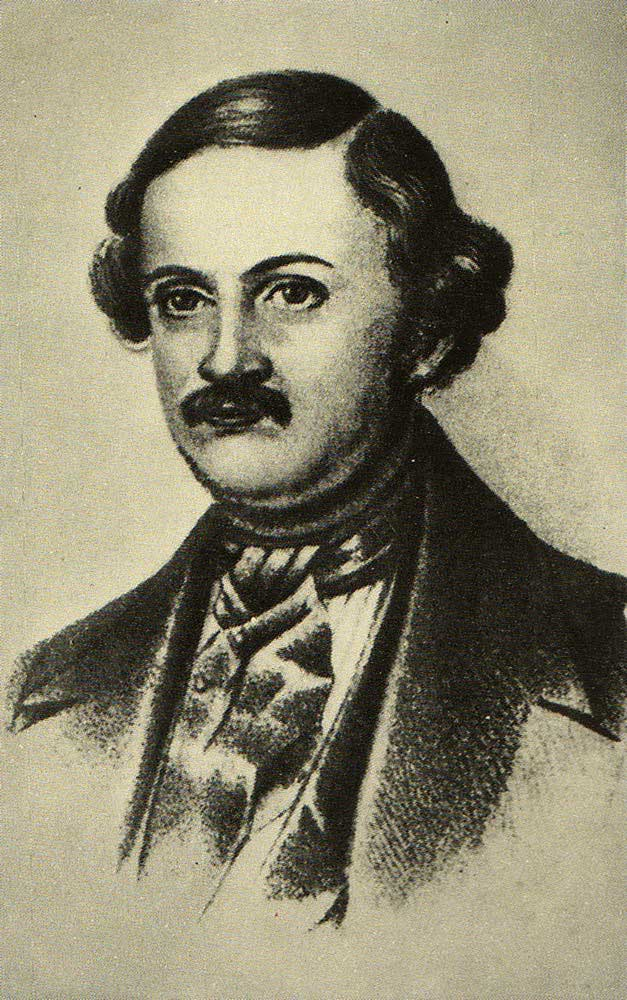
A.E.Varlamov. Unknown artist - 1830s

Alexander Egorovich Varlamov (or Aleksandr Yegorovich Varlamov; Russian: Александр Егорович Варламов; 27 November 1801 – 27 October 1848) was a 19th-century composer, singer, teacher, conductor, and one of the founding fathers of the genre of the Russian art song. He is recorded as being one of the first Russian creators to devise a technical process of singing in his monograph, Polnaya Shkola Penia - The Complete School of Singing (Moscow, 1840) He was also the notable father of Russian, 20th-century Actor Konstantin Varlamov and the great-grandfather of 20th-century composer Alexander Vladimirovich Varlamov. His art songs were famed for their Russian motives and authentic capture of everyday experiences. So much so that many of his songs were immortalized in literature by notable Russian and American authors and playwrights such as N. Gogol, I. Turgenev, and J. Galsworthy.

== Family ==
Alexander Egorovich Varlamov was born into a poor family on the 15th (27th) of November, 1801. His father was a petty officer hailing from Volosh, and is said to have descended from a Moldovan lineage.

== Education ==
Alexander's vocal talent and musical acumen pronounced itself early. Around the age of nine, he was able to learn music solely by hearing and was said to have a beautiful singing voice. He showed a particular interest in church music and folk songs, along with an aptitude for violin playing, which he learned self-directly. Due to these factors, at the age of nine he was sent by his parents to St. Petersburg and quickly accepted as a young singer in the St. Petersburg State Academic Capella. He entered into his studies in/around 1809 and began studying music seriously under the direction of Dmitry Bortnyansky. He was quickly chosen to be the soloist in the Children's Choir. He also began to study the piano, cello, and guitar along with his other studies. He studied in the Academy for 10 years and graduated in 1819.

Upon graduating and having amassed exceptional technical prowess during his studious decade, in 1819 he was chosen to act as the singing teacher at The Russian Court Church in The Hague (Holland), where Anna Pavlovna, sister to Alexander I and wife of Prince Frederick of the Netherlands, was living at the time. However, due to less than adequate training at the Academy, he was lacking in his music theory skills and only had fundamental comprehension of theoretical principles. However, within The Hague and Brussels, there was a strong presence of French operatic culture and thus, he was able to quickly learn about the technicalities of vocalic singing and developed his pedagogical skills. Along with improving his theory acumen, during his time abroad, he often visited concerts, operas, and music performances, along with hosting public performances of his own talents as a singer and guitarist.

During his stay in Holland, he attended various operas, including Gioachino Rossini's Barber of Seville [Barbiere di Siviglia]. He was delighted in the way Rossini used the Russian folk-song "Ах, зачем же огород городить" [Oh, why fence in the Garden?] in the finale of Act 2 of the opera, most likely due to Rossini's relationship with Russian aristocrats and proximity to their musical heritage. But despite his vast network of musical connections and dilettante friends, he felt overstrung with responsibilities and requirements, all of which were leaving him with no time for his own artistic work and development.

He would stay in residence in Holland until 1823, returning to St. Petersburg after four years abroad.

== Career ==
In 1823, Alexander returned to St. Petersburg and restarted his singing pedagogy, taking a position within The St. Petersburg Theater School as a Vocal Teacher for the Preobrazhensky and Semyonovsky regiments. However, at this point he began to infrequently composer alongside hosting concerts of his music and singing in public recitals. The fluctuation in income drove him to seek employment and in 1829, he joined the faculty at the State Academic Capella where he held the position as Choir Director and teacher of singing for the young students. Because of Varlamov's close relationship with the imminent composer M. Glinka, in 1827 having made his acquaintance, he would be asked to become a regular attendee of his salons in St. Petersburg residence where Glinka held evening salons with the boys from the Acapella Academy. They would sing during these events. He would also regularly conduct symphonically and perform as a singer with The St. Petersburg Philharmonic Orchestra, his first Russian performance being facilitated through them.

Two years later, in 1829 he also conjoined with his alma mater, St. Petersburg State Academic Capella, and became a Choir Director and Vocal Teacher there, further providing income and job stability. Varlamov's pedagogical and musical work within the Cappella mostly centered around sacred repertoire. However, Varlamov's interests mostly laid in the secular category, primarily within theater songs called vaudvilles. He would soon leave his position in order to seek more fulfilling work.

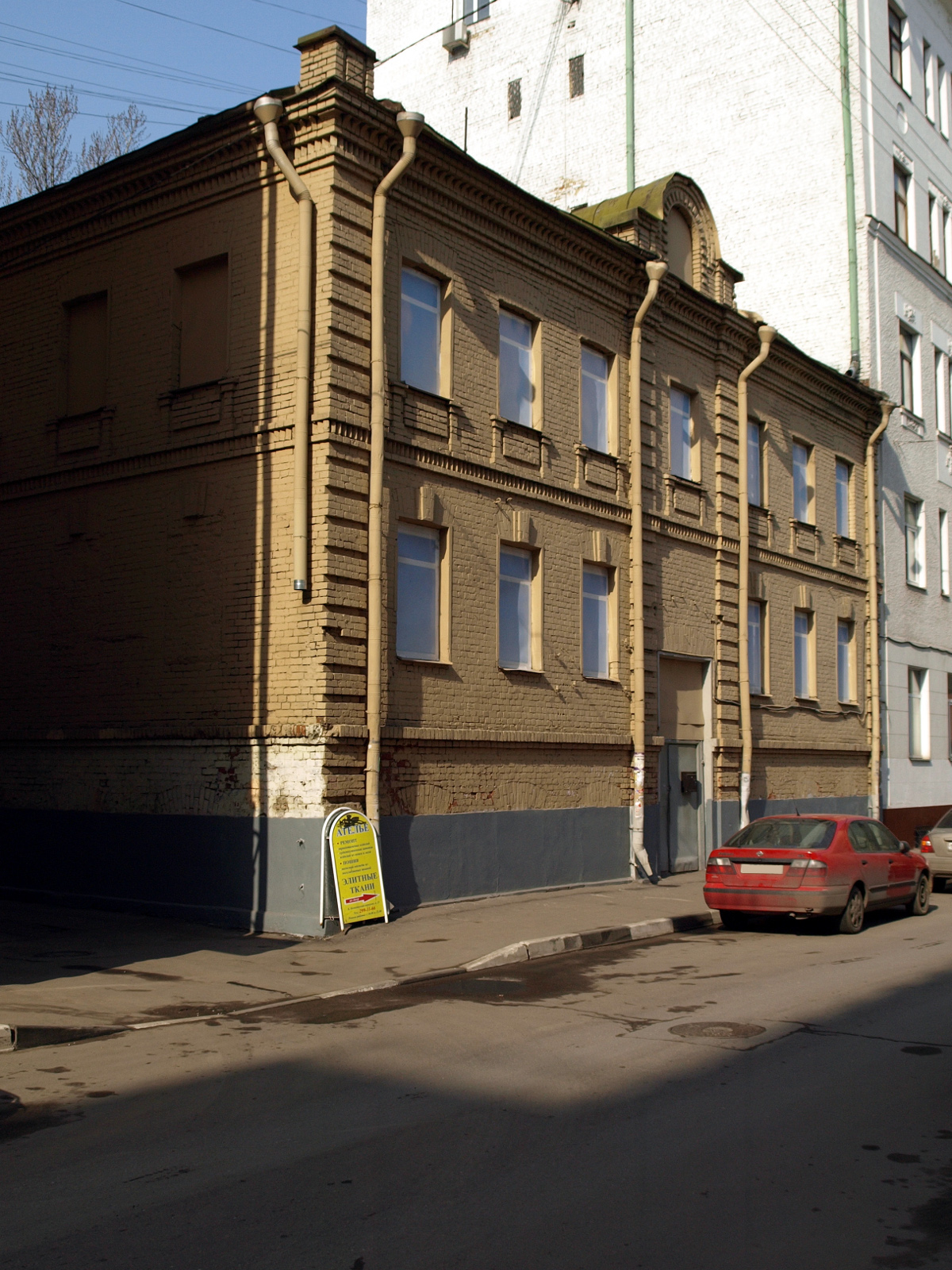
1840s Moscow residence - Demolished in 2011

Due to his increasing unhappiness at the Academy, in 1831 he officially left and moved to Moscow where he joined the staff of the Imperial Theatres of Russian Empire, an organization operated by the Ministry of the Imperial Court. He worked as a Conductor of vaudvilles, as well as vocal Pedagog at the Mikhail Shchepkin Higher Theatre School and private vocal tutor.

During the 1830-1840s, Varlamov's compositional career began to formally begin, some his first romances being created during this time. Many of the themes bear resemblance to the popular Symbolist movement and the idolization of the natural world in all of its transcendental and mysterious ways. Some of the titles of his romances being "Red sundress", "What is foggy, clear dawn", and "Do not make noise, violent winds." Alongside his personal compositions, he also began writing scores for shows at the Maly Theater as well as in St. Petersburg written by Western and European sources. Some of the plays during this time were A. Shakhovsky's The Two Man, Roslavlev based on the novel by L. A. Zagoskin, Shakespeare's Hamlet, and Victor Hugo's Esmeralda.

From 1832 to 1844, Alexander would also take up the position as Assistant Conductor and Kapellmeister at the Moscow Imperial Theater. During this period, Varlamov got to make acquaintances with a number of artists, including everyone from the troupe at the Maly Theater, actors S. F. Mochalov and M. S. Shchepkin, the composer A. Verstovsky and writer L.A. Zagoskin building rapport with the multi-talented musician. From these influences, Varlamov realized his passion of writing authentic music "in Russian," quickly turning to folk-music as his genre of choice.

Nearing the final chapters of his life, he moved back to St. Petersburg in 1887. Before he died, he began publishing some of his vocal arrangements of Russian and Ukrainian folk songs in the magazine Russian Peavets.

== Identity ==
=== Composer ===
Varlamov mostly created theatrical songs [vaudvilles] which used basic accompaniment or full orchestra and incidental compositions, along with orchestral poems and other semi-symphonic works. Additionally, he also composed ballet scores, two of his ballets "The Sultan's Fun" (1834) and "The Sly Boy and the Cannibal" (1837) [also known as "The Thumb Boy"] having been staged at the Bolshoi Theater. He expanded his proficiency in writing romances and art songs. In 1833 alone, over 85 vocal works were published by the composer for public consumption in Moscow. Between 1861 and 1864, a Complete Works edition of his music was published in St. Petersburg under the Russian title Polnoe sobranie sochineniy [Full compositions of writings]. He is most well-known, however the work itself is forgotten, for his art song The Red Sarafan, whose folk-inclined melody is thought to be genuine. The melody is used by the Polish composer Henryk Wieniawski in his fantasy for violin and piano called Souvenir of Moscow, Op. 6.

Varlamov is also accredited with producing two-song, folk-inspired, cycles, a style which was typical of the Russian 19th-century. These curt cycles would were composed of two, diametric songs, both in compositional style and theme. The first song would be slow and methodical, often using more sedate textures and expansive harmonic gestures, while the second would be more lively and up-tempo, using bright sonorities and exuberant effects. Thematically, the songs would mirror these diametrics, the first talking about solemn and morose themes, while the second would deal with lively atmospheres. A peculiarity of these songs would be the emphasis on recreating the folk-song accompaniment, so polyphonic motion would often furnish the underpinnings to the vocal melody above, mimicking the Russian folk traditions of Podgolosnaya ["under the voice"].

As a Composer, his corpus is said to be filled with over 150 original vocal songs, several vocal ensembles, and numerous folk arrangements. However, many of them do not survive to the present day.

=== Performer ===
He also had a career in musical performance. He would routinely perform his own folk arrangements and art songs, receiving praise for his realistic portrayal of emotion. He was greatly sought after for salons and evening gatherings to sing and entertain, as well as greatly loved when giving public concerts and recitals.

=== Teacher ===
Because of his technical training and adeptness in all areas of musical literacy, he was a highly requested music teacher in Russia. In 1840, he published his book called "School of Singing" where he outlined in detail the main attributes of his pedagogical style and accumulated experiences. This publication would prove to be the first available source in Russia on the methodology of the vocal arts.

== Artistic Style ==
Varlamov's affinity for the rustic, agrarian heritage that Russian folk-songs afforded caused his compositional style to match in return. His works are noted for their thematic and musical buoyancy, clarity, and natural elegance. While the social themes did not draw a direct connection to his life as his contemporary Alexander Alyabyev, another notable 'father' of the Russian art song tradition, his song's themes were analogous to the social reality of the Russian 1830s. Because of his adeptness in capturing the sentiments of his surroundings, he became a notable figure in the Russian musical culture of his time, transcending the rigid class boundaries with his melodic tunes which were able to radiate the intrinsic beauty of the Russian everyday experience. Because his compositional prowess at utilizing folk material was so great, stemming all the way back to his childhood development into the musical art form, many of his tunes were mistaken for authentic, agrarian folk-tunes during his time.

Works like "The Red Sarafan," with its fluid lyricism and rustic harmonies, encased within the waves of easy rhythmicity and content tempi, showcased his indelible fidelity to the true natures of the Russian traditional music and her practices. Another song entitled "Don't Wake Her Up at Dawn," won the composer praise for its solemnly pensive yet majestically lush evocativity, albeit using sparse texture and a simplistic accompaniment. It is regarded as one of the composer's best art songs due to its purified musical rhetoric and humble warmth.

This extended even to his singing, being praised for his sincerity of delivery. The contemporarily little-known but historically important Russian composer Nikolai Titov, yet another 'father' of the Russian art song genre, had expressed his praise of the composer's bucolic timbral ability. He is noted as saying he could sing "both in the living room of the grandee, and in the man's chicken hut."

== Compositions ==
=== Songs ===
- Angel
- Do Not Wake Her At Dawn
- Grass
- I Will Saddle My Stallion
- Mary
- Melodie
- Napominaniye (Reminder)
- Not Long Ago, To Magic Sounds
- O Do Not Kiss Me
- O Do Not Leave Me
- O molchi, milyi drug moi, molchi (O never speak of it, my love)
- Snowstorm (song)
- Red Sarafan
- Along the Street a Blizzard Sweeps
- The Lonely Sail Whitens
- The Sail

=== Song Cycles ===
- "Oh you Time," and "What should I live and grieve" (Two-song cycle: Slow/fast)

=== Anthologies ===
- 1973-1966: Songs and Romances, Vol. 1-3 (Vladimiar Zharov), Vol. 4 (V. Zharov and Nikolai Listova), Muzyka.

=== Books ===
- 1840: Polnaya Shkola Penia - The Complete School of Singing (Moscow)

== Recordings ==
Songs of A. Varlamov are performed by modern singers:

- «Белеет парус одинокий» on YouTube of Mikhail Lermontov, Sergei Lemeshev sings
- «На заре ты ее не буди» on YouTube, Afanasy Fet's poems
- The Prayer («Молитва») on YouTube of Mikhail Lermontov (Oleg Pogudin sings)
- Вдоль по улице метелица метет on YouTube of Dmitriy Glebov
- «Соловей-соловушка» on YouTube of Aleksey Koltsov (Anatoliy Aleksandrovich sings)
- «Что затуманилась, зоренька ясная?..» on YouTube, Dmitri Hvorostovsky sings
- «Красный сарафан» (The Red Sarafan) on YouTube of N. Tsyganov (ru: Николай Григорьевич Цыганов). Olga Kulichova sings
