= Nikolai Muzil =

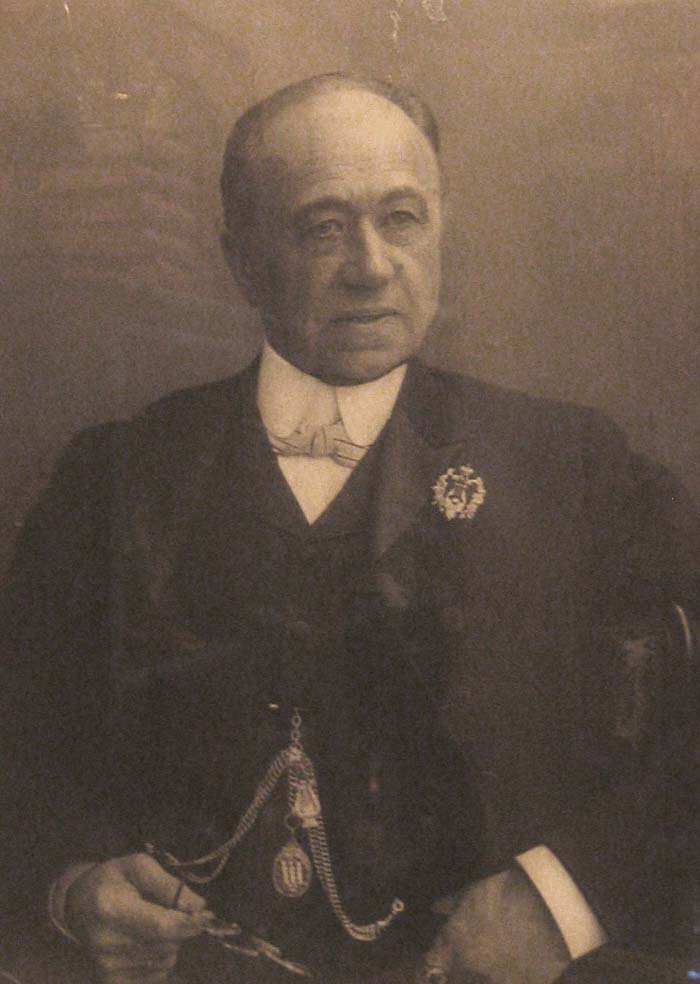
- Born: Николай Игнатьевич Музиль; November 26, 1839; Moscow, Russian Empire
- Died: July 9, 1906 (aged 66); Moscow, Russian Empire
- Occupation: actor
- Years active: 1865-1905
- Spouse: Varvara Myzil-Borozdina
- Awards: Meritorious Artist of the Imperial Theatres (1903)

Nikolai Ignatyevich Muzil (Russian: Николай Игнатьевич Музиль; 26 November 1839 – 9 July 1906) was a Russian stage actor associated with Moscow's Maly Theatre. He was honoured with the Meritorious Artists of the Imperial Theatres title in 1903.

== Biography ==
Born to Ignaty Muzil, a well-established Russian merchant of Czech origins, Nikolai Muzil made his debut at the Maly Theatre in 1865 and stayed with it for the rest of his life. Of his twenty parts in Alexander Ostrovsky's plays (ten of which came in productions given to him as benefits by the author), most lauded (by Konstantin Stanislavski, among others) were those of Gavrila (An Ardent Heart, 1869), Pyotr (The Forest, 1871), Narokov (Talents and Admirers, 1881) and Shmaga (Guilty Without Fault, 1884). The foremost comic actor of Russian theatre of the time, Muzil was praised as master psychologist who imparted his characters with unique vitality and authenticity.

Nikolai Muzil is also remembered as the founder of a distinguished theatrical dynasty. His wife, Varvara Muzil-Borozdina (1853–1927); his daughters, Varvara Ryzhova (1871–1963), Nadezhda Muzil-Borozdina (1880–1952), and Elena Muzil (1871–1961); his son, Nikolai Muzil; his grandson, Nikolai Ryzhov (1900–1986); and his great-granddaughter, Tatyana Ryzhova (1941–2012), all performed as actors at the Maly Theatre.
