= Pyotr Zubrov =

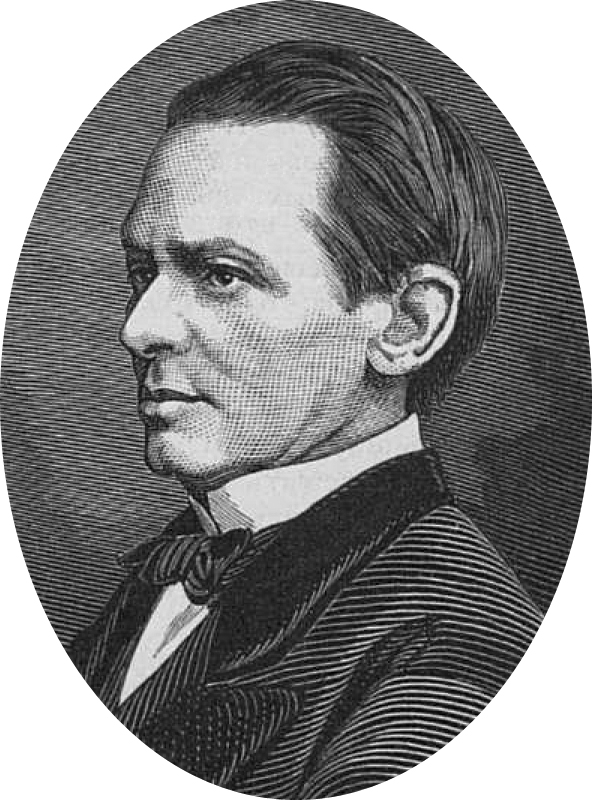
- Portrait by Pyotr Borel. Vsemirnaya Illyustratsia, 1873
- Born: Pyotr Ivanovich Zubrov; Пётр Иванович Зубров; 1822; Saint Petersburg, Russian Empire
- Died: 9 December 1873 (aged 50–51); Saint Petersburg, Russian Empire
- Occupation: stage actor

Pyotr Ivanovich Zubrov (Russian: Пётр Иванович Зубров; 1822, in Saint Petersburg, Imperial Russia – 9 December 1873, in Saint Petersburg, Imperial Russia) was a Russian stage actor, associated with the Alexandrinsky Theatre.

Having debuted on stage in 1851, he achieved his first success as Gordey Tortsov in Alexander Ostrovsky's Poverty is No Vice, and since then excelled in many of the latter's plays' productions, as well as the works by Alexey Pisemsky (Nikashka in A Bitter Fate) and Nikolai Gogol (Gorodnichy in Revizor). Zubrov translated several plays into Russian and authored two original vaudevilles, The Deaf One Is to Blame (Глухой всему виной) and Honestly (Честное слово).
