= Nikolay Tsyganov =

Russian poet

Nikolai Tsyganov
- Born: Николай Григорьевич Цыганов; 1797; Saint Petersburg, Russian Empire
- Died: 12 December 1832 (aged 34–35); Moscow, Russian Empire
- Occupations: poet, folklorist, singer, actor

Nikolai Grigoryevich Tsyganov (Николай Григорьевич Цыганов, 1797, Saint Petersburg, Russian Empire, – 12 December 1832, Moscow, Russian Empire) was a Russian poet, singer and actor. An avid musical folklore collector, Tsyganov became known as an author and performer of his own songs, mostly variations of the traditional ones, some of which (like the well-known "Don't sew me a red sarafan, dear mother" ("Не шей ты мне, матушка, красный сарафан" (Note: The best known arrangement of "Red Sarafan" is by Aleksandr Varlamov) ) later came to be regarded as bona fide Russian folk songs. The Russian Songs by N.Tsyganov, compiled by the author, came out posthumously, in 1834, to much critical acclaim.
