= Voloshino, Voronezh Oblast =

Voloshino Волошино
- Selo
- Location within Voronezh Oblast Location within Russia
- Coordinates: 50°52′N 38°56′E
- Country: Russia
- Region: Voronezh Oblast
- District: Ostrogozhsky District
- Time zone: UTC+3:00

Voloshino (Russian: Волошино) is a rural locality (a selo) in Ostrogozhsk, Ostrogozhsky District, Voronezh Oblast, Russia. The population was 582 as of 2010. There are 7 streets.

== Geography ==
Voloshino is located 12 km west of Ostrogozhsk (the district's administrative centre) by road. Gubarevka is the nearest rural locality.
