= Vasily Zhivokini =

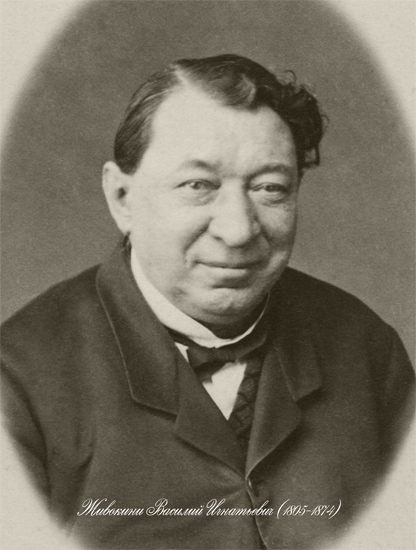
- Born: Giovannio Lammona; 1805; Moscow, Russian Empire
- Died: 30 January 1874 (aged 68–69); Moscow, Russian Empire
- Occupation: actor
- Years active: 1824-1874

Vasily Ignatyevich Zhivokini (Russian: Василий Игнатьевич Живокини, born Giovannio Lammona; 1805 in Moscow, Russian Empire – 30 January 1874 in Moscow, Russian Empire) was a prominent Russian stage actor, a comic, associated with Moscow's Maly Theatre where he performed for fifty years.

== Biography ==
Giovanny Lammona was born in Moscow, to Yoakhim de Lammona, an Italian artist and decorator. His mother Pelageya Vasilyevna Azarevicheva was a serf actress at Count Semyon Zorich Theatre, whom Yoakhim married when working with that troupe as decorator, in the early 1800s. In 1824, still a senior year student at Moscow Theatre Institute, Lammona joined the Moscow's Maly Theatre. From 1826 onwards, when, after his first marriage, he joined the Russian Orthodox Church, he's been known under his assumed Russian name, Vasily Zhivokini.

For the next fifty years Zhivokini was one of Moscow's leading actors, engaged in all the key comic parts of the contemporary repertoire: Dobchinsky and Zemlyanika in Gogol's Revizor; Zagoretsky and later Repetilov in Griboyedov's Woe from Wit, Kochkarev and Podkolesin in Gogol's Marriage, Rasplyuyev in Krechinsky's Marriage (by Aleksandr Sukhovo-Kobylin), and many others. He was appearing regularly in plays by Alexander Ostrovsky (Rispolozhensky in It's a Family Affair-We'll Settle It Ourselves, Gradoboyev in An Ardent Heart, Kuritsyn in Live Not as You Would Like To, etc.), mostly as merchants and senior servants, habitually resorting to humorous improvisations playing havoc with the original text, much to the amusement of the appreciative audiences.

In 1873 Zhivokini's health severely declined and he was advised to retire. Once having felt better, on 17 January 1874 he came up on stage, managed somehow to finish the show and died several hours later.

Vasily Zhivokini's Memoirs, serialized originally in 1864 (Teatralnye Afishi) and 1874 (Moskovskiye Vedomosti), came out as a book in 1914.

== Legacy ==
Konstantin Stanislavski remembered: "Having entered the stage, he immediately headed for the audiences, pronounced his greetings, received the ovation and only then addressed the task of playing his part. Such an outrage would have been unacceptable at any more or less serious theatre, but this habit just couldn't be taken away from Zhivokini, such an integral part of his artistic persona it was. Just seeing their favourite actor filled people's hearts with joy and he invariably received his second, massive ovation later - for being Zhivokini, for giving people those moments of happiness that make life so wonderful..."

"Zhivokini... never created characters, he what he used to do was take any particular mask and stuck it onto his own persona... Endowed with enormous gift, he never even thought of trying to develop it by hard work. He went by pure inspiration, his performances were patchy and unhinged, but for all that, immensely absorbing. According to one critic, 'For fifty years Zhivokoni played himself and nobody else but did this in such a way that the audiences never had a single dull moment in the course of this half a century,'" the theatre historian M. Vasilevskaya wrote.
