= Poverty is No Vice =

- Written by: Aleksander Ostrovsky
- Original language: Russian
- Genre: Comedy

Premiere
- Date premiered: 25 January 1854
- Place premiered: Maly Theatre in Moscow

Poverty is No Vice (Bednost ne porok, Бедность не порок) is a play by Alexander Ostrovsky, written in 1853 and published as a separate edition in the early 1854. It was premiered in Moscow's Maly Theatre on January 25, 1854 and in Saint Petersburg's Alexandrinsky Theatre on September the 9th.

== History ==
Ostrovsky started to work upon Poverty is No Vice (working title: God Thwarts the Proud One, Gordym Bog protivitsa) in the late August 1853 and finished it in just two months. On November 23, 1853, the play was publicly read at Apollon Grigoriev's and was warmly welcomed by the audience of good friends. The next reading took place at the sculptor Nikolai Ramazanov's home with a different set of guests and again was successful. For some reason the Moskvityanin chief Mikhail Pogodin was hesitating with the publication, but the play soon came out as a book and was taken up by the Maly Theatre, for actor Prov Sadovsky's benefice.

Poverty is No Vice was premiered on January 25, 1854, with Prov Sadovsky playing Lyubim Tortsov, the "virtuous drunkard" and "a true Russian," unlike, apparently, his affluent brother who was trying "to be an Englishman." The premiere coincided with the famous French actress Rachel's shows, which had to be moved to morning hours. Such juxtaposition served to polarize even more the Moscow theatrical community as regards Ostrovsky's controversial phenomenon.
