= Aaron Zundelevich =

Jewish Russian revolutionary narodnik

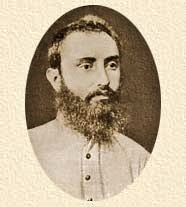
- Born: c. 1852; Soly, Vilna Governorate, Russian Empire
- Died: 23 August 1923 (aged 70–71); London, United Kingdom

Aaron Isaakovich Zundelevich (Note: Also romanized as Zundelevič) (Yiddish: אהרן בן יצחק זונדעלעװיטש, Russian: Аарон Исаакович Зунделевич; c. 1852 – 23 August 1923) was a Jewish Russian revolutionary narodnik.

== Biography ==
Zundelevich grew up in a lower middle class Jewish family in a small town in the Oshmyany uyezd of the Vilna Governorate. He studied at the Vilna Rabbinical School until 1873, where he organized a revolutionary circle whose members included Aaron Liebermann and Abraham Cahan.

Zundelevich later joined the Circle of Tchaikovsky in St. Petersburg and, as a founding member of the secret society Land and Liberty, he advocated the use of terror as a means of political struggle. He fled to Königsberg and Berlin in 1875 under the threat of arrest, but soon returned to Russia illegally. On 30 June 1876, Zundelevich participated in the organization of Peter Kropotkin's escape from the Nikolaev Military Hospital.

The following year, Zundelevich began to organize the import of illegal literature and printing equipment to St. Petersburg and organized a clandestine "free press" to spread Narodnik propaganda. He joined the Russian revolutionary group Narodnaya Volya, soon becoming an elected member of its executive committee, responsible for relations with foreign groups and the dissemination of revolutionary publications. Zundelevich participated in the assassination by Sergey Kravchinsky of Nikolay Mezentsov on 4 August 1878 and the preparation of Alexander Soloviev's attempt on the life of Alexander II on 2 April 1879.

Zundelevich was arrested in the National Library on 28 October 1879 and sentenced in the October 1880 Trial of the Sixteen to indefinite hard labour. He was imprisoned in the Peter and Paul Fortress, and thereafter in the Kara and Akatuy katorga prisons. He was released after the 1905 Russian Revolution, and emigrated to England in 1907.
