= Aleksandr Kvyatkovsky =

Russian revolutionary

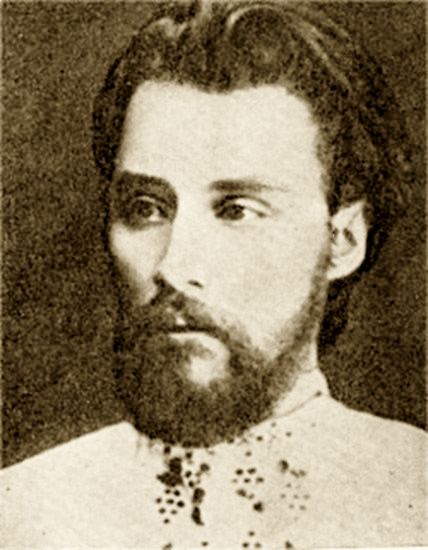
- A Russian revolutionary and member of the Executive Committee of Narodnaya Volya
- Born: January 1852; Tomsk, Russian Empire
- Died: 4 November 1880 (aged 28); Peter and Paul Fortress, Russia

Aleksandr Aleksandrovich Kvyatkovsky (Russian: Александр Александрович Квятковский; January 1852 – 16 November [O.S. 4 November] 1880) was a Russian revolutionary and member of the Executive Committee of Narodnaya Volya.

== Life ==
Kvyatkovsky was born in Tomsk. His family were minor nobility. His father was a gold miner. He studied at St. Petersburg Institute of Technology, but left in 1874 to take part in the Going into the people movement. He and his brother set up a locksmith business in a village in the Tula region, south of Moscow, with the intention of spread in political ideas among the peasants. His brother was arrested, and was sentenced to hard labour at the Trial of the 193. Aleksandr returned to St Petersburg, where he was arrested in November 1874, but released in April, after which he worked in a factory in the Kostroma region. In July 1876, he joined an agricultural colony in Nizhny Novgorod, but had to leave after a police raid in June 1877. He was involved in an unsuccessful attempt to free Porfiry Voynaralsy, one of the leading defendants at the Trial of the 193. During 1878, he and a fellow socialist, Mikhail Popov, toured markets in the Voronezh region, making contact with peasants. According to Popov, they were encouraged by the responses they got, but in autumn 1878, he was called back to St Petersburg by Alexander Mikhailov, who persuaded him to join the Liberty or Death (Свобода или смерть) group, dedicated to assassinating the Tsar Alexander II.

Kvyatkovsky participated in the Lipetsk and Voronezh Congresses of Zemlya i volya or Land and Liberty. When Land And Liberty broke into two factions as the result of an internal dispute over tactics in August 1879, Kvyatkovsky opted to side with the stance taken by the more adventurous People's Will or Narodnaya Volya group.

He was also one of the organizers of Narodnaya Volya. In September–November 1879, Kvyatkovsky was in charge of a clandestine print shop and acted as a liaison between the Executive Committee and Stepan Khalturin during the planning stages of a terrorist act in the Winter Palace.

== Death ==
Kvyatkovsky shared lodgings in St Petersburg with Vera Figner. When she was sent by the organisation to Odesa, she suggested that her younger sister, Yevgenia, should take her room. Yevgenia Figner volunteered to distribute revolutionary literature among students, but out of inexperience, she used the same false name under which she was registered at her address. This brought police to their lodgings, where they were both arrested, on November 24, 1879. The police found dynamite in Kvyatkovsky's room, and a piece of paper containing a diagram. After an explosion at the Winter Palace, three months later, the police realised that the diagram was a plan of the palace, which marked the spot where the bomb was set off.

Kvyatkovsky was sentenced to death at the Trial of the Sixteen in 1880. He was executed at the age of 28 in the Peter and Paul Fortress.
