= Trial of the Sixteen (1880) =

The Trial of the Sixteen ("Процесс 16-ти" in Russian) was a trial of sixteen members of the Narodnaya Volya in Russian Empire on October 25–30 (November 6–11), 1880.

The trial took place at a district military court in St.Petersburg. Members of the Executive Committee of Narodnaya Volya - Aaron Zundelevich, Aleksandr Kvyatkovsky and Stepan Shiryaev - were the principal defendants. Nikolai Bukh, S.A.Ivanova, Andrei Presnyakov and others were also on trial. All of the defendants were accused of being associated with Narodnaya Volya. Kvyatkovsky was also accused of planning two assassination attempts on the tsar, on April 2, 1879 and February 5, 1880. Shiryaev was also accused of planning to murder the tsar on November 19, 1879. Later on, it turned out that I.F.Okladsky was agent provocateur. As a result, Kvyatkovsky and Presnyakov were sentenced to death; four other people to eternal katorga; six others to 4 to 20 years of katorga; and the remaining four to Siberian exile.
