= Vera Figner =

Russian political activist (1852–1942)

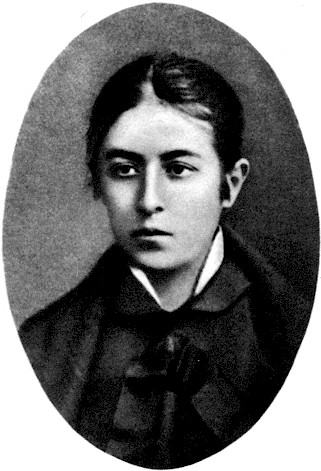
- Portrait, c. 1880
- Born: July 7, 1852; Kazan Governorate, Russian Empire
- Died: June 15, 1942 (aged 89); Moscow, Soviet Union

Vera Nikolayevna Figner Filippova (Russian: Вера Николаевна Фигнер Филиппова; 7 July [O.S. 25 June] 1852 – 25 June 1942) was a Russian revolutionary and political activist.

Born in Kazan Governorate of the Russian Empire into a noble family of German and Russian descent, Figner was a leader of the clandestine Narodnaya Volya ("People's Will") group, which advocated the use of terror to overthrow the government, Figner was a participant in planning the successful assassination of Alexander II in 1881. Figner was arrested and spent 20 months in solitary confinement prior to trial, at which she was sentenced to death. The sentence was subsequently commuted and Figner was imprisoned in the Shlisselburg Fortress for 20 years before being sent into internal exile. Figner gained international fame in large part because of the widely translated memoir of her experiences. She was treated as a heroic icon of revolutionary sacrifice after the February Revolution in 1917 and was a popular public speaker during that year.

== Biography ==
=== Early years ===
Vera Figner was born on 7 July [O.S. 25 June] 1852, the oldest of six children of Nikolai Alexandrovich Figner, a retired army staff captain and his wife, the former Ekaterina Khristoforovna Kuprianova, both members of the hereditary Russian nobility. Her maternal grandfather owned more than 17,000 acres of land, worked by serfs existing in a state of semi-slavery and the family retained two maids, who were also serfs, until the Emancipation of 1861. Her father served in the state forestry service, resigning that post to become a local administrative functionary called a "peace mediator" in the years after emancipation. She was the sister of Lidija Figner and of the famous Russian tenor Nikolai Figner.

During Vera Figner's childhood, the adults in her family thought that she was "a beautiful doll ... good to look at ... but empty" and expected that she would go into society and marry someone older and rich. In 1863, at the age of eleven, Figner was sent to the Rodionovsky Institute for Noble Girls in the city of Kazan, which she attended for the next six years. As one of only six cities in the Russian Empire to host a university, the provincial capital of Kazan was a city of culture and ideas and Figner gradually came to question and ultimately reject the passive and submissive gender role which the Radionovsky Institute attempted to inculcate into its pupils. Despite the stifling intellectual regime at the cloistered institute, Figner expanded her intellectual horizons by surreptitiously reading prohibited books obtained during brief visits home. She proved to be an excellent student, taking a particular interest in history and literature, and received the prize given to the top academic performer upon her graduation in 1869.

Figner desired to study medicine, which was not permitted in Russia following the closure to women of the St. Petersburg Medical-Surgical Academy in the early 1860s. This meant leaving Russia to study abroad, and Vera Figner turned her eyes to the University of Zurich, which was accepting Russian women despite their lack of gimnazium diplomas. In 1870, she married Alexei Filippov, an investigating magistrate who shared her love of books and supported her ambition to go to university. After her father's death, she persuaded Filippov to give up his position and accompany her to Zurich, to study medicine.

From 1872 to 1875, she was a student of Department of Medicine at the University of Zurich. In 1873, Figner joined the Fritsche circle, which was composed of thirteen young Russian radical women, some of whom would become important members of the All-Russian Social Revolutionary Organization. She had trouble reconciling her new political view of herself as a parasitic member of the gentry with her previous view of herself as a good, innocent, person. A directive banning all Russian women students from remaining in Zurich was published in the Government Herald, accusing them of using their medical knowledge to perform abortions on themselves, in 1873.

=== Revolutionary leader ===
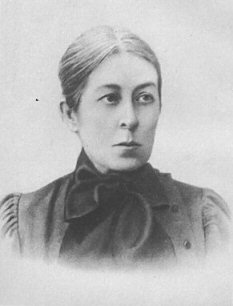
Vera Figner as she appeared during the Revolution of 1905

Most of the Fritsche decided to return to Russia and spread socialist propaganda among the Russian peasantry, but Figner decided to remain in Switzerland to finish her studies. In 1875, Mark Natanson told her that the Fritsche desperately needed her help in Russia. She returned to Russia that year without getting her degree, but found herself unable to help the circle and so got a license as a paramedic and divorced her husband, where she became active with other revolutionary intellectuals in the Zemlya i Volya (Land and Liberty) organization.

Figner took part in the Kazan demonstration in St. Petersburg in 1876. From 1877 through 1879, working as a doctor's assistant, she conducted revolutionary propaganda in the villages around Samara and Saratov.

In the spring of 1879 the Zemlya i Volya organization was deeply divided over the question of terrorism, with one wing of the party advocating revolutionary propaganda in the villages and the other in favor of creating a revolutionary situation through the assassination of key figures in the Tsarist government and monarchy. In June of that year party activists gathered at the Voronezh Congress in a final effort to settle these differences. No permanent solution was reached and by the fall the Zemlya i Volya organization has split into two independently functioning groups: an anti-terror faction led by proto-Marxist Georgy Plekhanov called Cherny Peredel (Black Repartition), which included Pavel Akselrod, Lev Deich, Vera Zasulich, and others; and a pro-terror faction called Narodnaya Volya (People's Will).

Vera Figner aligned herself with the latter, terrorist wing, becoming a member of the group's executive committee, which in a proclamation later in 1879 called for the execution of Tsar Alexander II for crimes committed against the people of the Russian Empire. The Narodnovoltsy (Narodnaya Volya members) established study circles of workers in St. Petersburg, Moscow, Odessa, Kiev, and Kharkov, and coordinated propaganda efforts among students at the country's universities. It also established printing presses for the production of leaflets and issued a magazine and a newspaper in an effort to build support for its revolutionary program.

As a member of the executive committee, Figner also took part in the creation of the paramilitary wing of Narodnaya Volya and coordinated its activities. Figner participated in planning the assassination of the Tsar, including a failed attempt in 1880 in Odessa and the successful effort on 1 March 1881, in St. Petersburg. During the night of 28 February – 1 March 1881, a contingent of Narodnovoltsy gathered at Figner's apartment and prepared bombs for the assassination attempt. On the day of the assassination, Figner was assigned to stay at the flat and shelter Narodnaya Volya members who might later be implicated in the attack. Upon hearing of Alexander II's demise at the hands of her fellow conspirators, Figner would later recall that, "I wept as did others that the heavy nightmare that had oppressed young Russia for ten years was over."

The State secret police were relentless in tracking down members of the terrorist organization responsible for the killing of the Tsar and by the spring of 1882 only Vera Figner remained at large in Russia out of Narodnaya Volya's executive committee of 1879–80. This status made Figner the focal point and leader of the group's depleted forces. One assassination was carried out on her watch, the shooting of a member of the secret police in Odessa in March 1882. Figner's main activity as the de facto head of the Narodnaya Volya organization in 1882 related to the restoration of the underground apparatus, which was devastated by secret police arrests and seizures of equipment. The Narodnovoltsy managed to set up a new underground press in the period and conducted propaganda work among university students.

Originally based in Odessa, Figner later moved to Kharkov, where she was ultimately betrayed by fellow Executive Committee member Sergey Degayev, who turned police informer in order to lessen his punishment after his 20 December 1882 arrest. On 10 February 1883, Figner, characterized by police as "one of the most dangerous of the Central Committee of terrorists," was herself arrested at her Kharkov apartment. The event moved new Tsar Alexander III to write in his diary, "She was finally caught."

=== Political prisoner ===
Following her arrest, Vera Figner spent the next 20 months before her trial in solitary confinement at the Peter and Paul Fortress. In 1884 Figner was sentenced to death, during the Trial of the Fourteen. This sentence was commuted through the intercession of Niko Nikoladze to perpetual penal servitude in Siberia. She was instead imprisoned for 20 years in the fortress at Schlüsselburg.

In 1904, Figner was sent into internal exile to the Arkhangelsk guberniya, then Kazan guberniya, and finally Nizhny Novgorod. In 1906 she was allowed to go abroad, where she organized a campaign for political prisoners in Russia. She spoke in European cities, collected money, published a brochure on Russian prisons translated into many languages. In 1907 Figner joined the Socialist Revolutionary Party (PSR), but left the organization in 1909 after the Azef scandal. In 1915 she returned to Russia. Upon her return, Figner immediately expressed support for the Bolshevik Revolution in 1917.

=== After the revolution ===
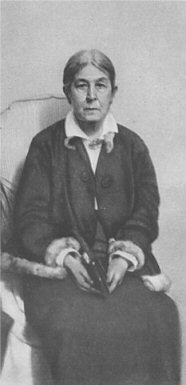
Vera Figner in 1930 as a leading figure of the Society of Former Political Prisoners and Exiles

After the Bolshevik Revolution, Vera Figner decided to share her experiences with the world through literature. In 1921, she published Memoirs of a Revolutionist, recounting her twenty years behind bars. In 1924, she compiled her prison writings into Collected Works (included in most versions of her memoirs). She continued documenting her experiences with In Penal Servitude (1927), which expanded on her time in prison, followed by After Penal Servitude (1930), where she reflected on her life after release. In 1932, she wrote From the Recent Past, a historical analysis of her participation in revolutionary movements, and in 1933, she published Recollections, offering personal reflections on life and the struggles of being a revolutionary.

In 1932, Figner's collected works were published in the Soviet Union by the publishing house of the Society of the Former Political Prisoners and Exiles in seven volumes.

=== Death and legacy ===
Vera Figner died in Moscow on 15 June 1942. She was 89 years old at the time of her death. Her legacy lives on through her writings, which gave praise to the men and women who fought alongside her and those who supported her during her imprisonment. She contributed many records and accounts in her writings about her efforts in promoting the Russian Revolution.
