= Mikhail Rodionovich Popov =

Russian revolutionary and political prisoner

Mikhail Rodionovich Popov (Russian: Михаил Родионович Попов; 26 November [O.S. 14 November] 1851 – 17 January [O.S. 4 January] 1908) was a Russian revolutionary and political prisoner.

== Biography ==
Popov was born in Glafirovka village, in the Yekaterinoslav region of Ukraine. His father was a priest. He studied at the Yekaterinoslav Theological Seminary and at a medical surgical academy. In 1874, during the 'Back to the People' movement, when hundreds of students went out to share the lives of the poor, he made contact with workers in St Petersburg, and nearby. He joined the illegal organisation, Zemlya i Volya in 1876, During 1877, he toured markets in the Voronezh region with Aleksandr Kvyatkovsky making contact with peasants, and was encouraged by the responses they received. In 1878, teamed up with Georgi Plekhanov, the future founder of Russian Marxism, to take control of a strike in the St Petersburg cotton mills, which was "the most important strike in the capital at that time".

In February 1879, Popov learnt that a mechanic named Nikolai Reinshtein who had joined the movement was a spy infiltrated by the police, and he and a fellow revolutionary killed him.

During 1879, a split was opening up within Zemlya i Volya over whether to continue trying to spread propaganda work, which was leading to mass arrests and severe sentences without obvious success, or whether to focus on terrorism, and particularly on a plan to assassinate the Tsar. Popov was one of the main organisers of a secret conference convened in June 1879, in Voronezh, where he and Plekhanov were the leading 'villagers' who were opposed to the turn towards terrorism. When it was agreed to split the organisation, he joined the Chernyi Peredel Black Repartition group, and based himself in Kyiv. After a few months, he became impatient with Plekhanov and other colleagues. He told Yelizaveta Kovalskaya: "People here don't care much about theory; everyone wants to do revolutionary work, they don't want to be a odds over programmes." He founded the South Russian Union, which united members of both parties.

Arrested on 22 February 1880, Popov was sentenced to death by a court in Kyiv, but the sentence was commuted to hard labour life, which he originally had to serve the Kara mines in Siberia. In 1882, there was a mass escape from Kara organised by Ippolit Myshkin. Once those involved had been recaptured, the authorities introduced new restrictions, which provoked protests by the prisoners. Popov was not involved in the escape, but was singled out as one of the leaders of the protests, and with Myshkin and six others, he was transported back to St Petersburg to be held in solitary confinement in the Alexey Ravelin of the Peter and Paul Fortress. In August 1884, he was moved to the Shlisselburg Fortress, where he continued protesting about prison conditions. Vera Figner, a fellow prisoner, wrote that:

He was a man with a constitution of iron, great self-control and an immense capacity for resistance, tempered in the Kara mines and the Alexey Ravelin; a cool, obstinate warrior of steel. When his jailers insulted and abused him, he repaid them in like coin. Rough treatment by the guards, noisy scuffles with gendarmes, did not bother him at all. They bound him, and beat him; several times they beat him cruelly; and he bore it all; he could still go on living.

Popov survived more than 20 years in the fortress. He was released in October 1905, during the 1905 revolution. He died in Rostov-on-Don.
