= Land and Liberty (Russia) =

1860s and 1870s Russian Narodnik revolutionary organization

Land and Liberty Земля и воля
- Symbol of the Land and Liberty movement
- Founded: 1860 (first); 1876 (second)
- Dissolved: 1864 (first); 1879 (second)
- Succeeded by: People's Will; Black Repartition
- Newspaper: Land and Liberty
- Ideology: Populism; Agrarian socialism Collectivist anarchism
- Political position: Far-left
- Movement: Narodniks

Land and Liberty (Russian: Земля и воля, romanized: Zemlya i volya or Zemlia i volia; also sometimes translated Land and Freedom) was a Russian clandestine revolutionary organization in the period 1861–1864, and was re-established as a political party in the period 1876–1879. It was a central organ of the Narodnik movement.

== The first composition (1861–1864) ==
The inspirers of the society were Alexander Herzen and Nikolay Chernyshevsky. The participants set as their goal the preparation of a peasant revolution, their policy documents created under the influence of the ideas of Herzen and Ogarev, the latter of which had coined the term "Land and Liberty" in one of his articles.

The first Executive Committee of the organization included 6 of its organizers (Nikolai Obruchev, Sergey Rymarenko, the brothers Nikolai and Alexander Serno-Solovyevich, Alexander Sleptsov, Vasily Kurochkin). Land and Liberty was a union of circles located in 13-14 cities. The largest circles were Moscow (Yuri Mosolov, Nikolai Shatilov) and St. Petersburg (Nikolai Utin and Natalia Corsini). The militant organization Land and Liberty also formed links with the "Committee of Russian Officers in Poland" under the leadership of Second Lieutenant Andrei Potebnya. According to the data available to Alexander Sleptsov, Land and Liberty counted 3,000 people as members (the Moscow branch alone consisted of 400 members).

In the summer of 1862, the tsarist authorities dealt a serious blow to the organization, arresting its leaders - Chernyshevsky and Serno-Solovyovich, as well as the radical journalist Dmitry Pisarev, who was associated with the revolutionaries. In 1863, due to the expiration of the Charter of the landlord and peasants, the members of the organization expected a powerful peasant uprising, which they wanted to organize in cooperation with the Polish revolutionaries. However, the Polish underground members were forced to organize an uprising ahead of the promised date, and hopes for a peasant revolt in Russia did not materialize. In addition, the liberals for the most part refused to support the revolutionary camp, believing in the progressiveness of the reforms that had begun in the country. Under the influence of all these factors, Land and Liberty was forced to dissolve itself in early 1864.

== The second composition (1876–1879) ==
The second composition of Land and Liberty, which was restored in 1876 as a populist organization, included such figures as Alexander Mikhailov, Georgi Plekhanov, Mark Natanson, Dmitry Lizogub, later Sergey Stepnyak-Kravchinsky, Nikolai Morozov, Sophia Perovskaya, Lev Tikhomirov and Nikolai Tyutchev. In total, the organization consisted of about 200 people. In its activities, Land and Liberty relied on a wide range of sympathizers. The name Land and Liberty was given to the Populist Society at the end of 1878, with the appearance of the organ of the same name.

The organization consisted of the main circle (subdivided into seven special groups according to the type of activity) and local groups located in many large cities of the empire. Land and Liberty had its own organ with the same name. An agent of Land and Liberty, Nikolai Kletochnikov, was introduced into the Third Section.

The revolutionaries chose to "settle" in the provinces of Saratov, Nizhny Novgorod, Samara, Astrakhan, Tambov, Pskov, Voronezh, the Don region and others. They also attempted to spread their revolutionary activities in the Northern Caucasus and the Urals. Land and Liberty organized clandestine publishing and distribution of the revolutionary literature, conducted propaganda among workers and took part in several strikes in Saint Petersburg in 1878-1879. It also influenced the development of the student movement by organizing or supporting demonstrations in Petersburg and other cities, including the so-called Kazan demonstration of 1876, where they would openly admit the organization’s existence for the first time.

The Kazan demonstration was the first political demonstration in Russia with the participation of advanced workers. The demonstration was organized and conducted by the Zemstvoi Narodniks and associated members of workers' circles on Kazanskaya Square in St. Petersburg. About 400 people gathered in the square, where Georgi Plekhanov delivered a passionate revolutionary speech to the audience.

Land and Liberty’s disappointment with the revolutionary activity in the countryside, intensification of the governmental repressions and political discontent during the Russo-Turkish War and ripening of the revolutionary situation favored the conception and development of new sentiments in the organization itself.

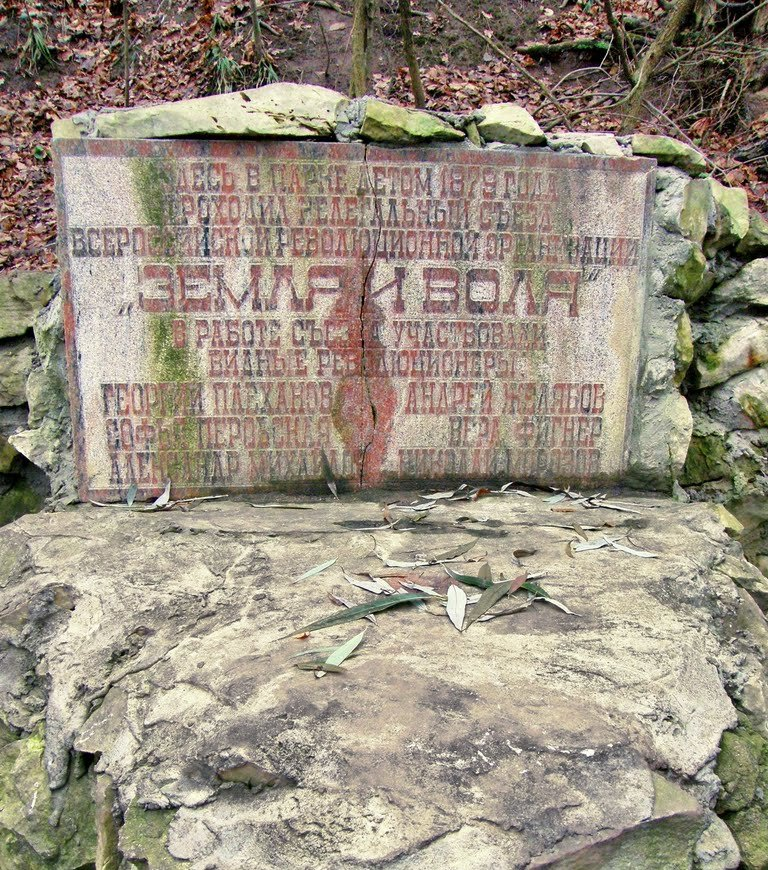
Memorial plaque installed at the site of the last congress of Land and Liberty in Voronezh.

The Lipetsk Congress was held in June 1879 in Lipetsk. Members of Land and Liberty that gathered at the congress included Alexander Mikhailov, Aleksandr Kvyatkovsky, Lev Tikhomirov, Nikolai Morozov and Andrei Zhelyabov, among others. The congress decided to include in the organization's program the recognition of the need for a political struggle against the Tsarist autocracy as a primary and independent task. The participants in the Lipetsk Congress declared themselves the Executive Committee of the Social Revolutionary Party and adopted a charter based on centralism, discipline and conspiracy. The Executive Committee, if the general congress of "land volunteers" in Voronezh agreed with the new program, was to take upon itself the implementation of the terror.

Disagreements between the supporters of the former strategy of inciting the countryside called derevenschiki, or "villagers" (Georgi Plekhanov, Mikhail Popov, Osip Aptekman etc.) and defenders of transition towards political struggle by means of systematic terrorist methods called politicians (Aleksandr Mikhailov, Aleksandr Kvyatkovsky, Nikolai Morozov, Lev Tikhomirov etc.) led to the convocation of the Voronezh Congress of Land and Liberty in June 1879, where the two rival groups would reach a short-term compromise. About 20 people took part, including Georgi Plekhanov, Alexander Mikhailov, Andrei Zhelyabov, Vera Figner, Sophia Perovskaya, Nikolai Morozov, Mikhail Frolenko and Osip Aptekman. Supporters of political struggle and terror (Zhelyabov, Mikhailov, Morozov, and others) attended the congress as a close-knit group, which was organized at the Lipetsk Congress. The resolutions of the Congress were of a compromise: along with activities among the people, the need for political terror was also recognized. Plekhanov, who argued the danger of being carried away by terror for the prospects of working among the people, formally split from Land and Liberty and left the congress.

By 15 August 1879, Land and Liberty had dissolved, breaking up into two independent organizations: the terrorist wing forming Narodnaya Volya and the political wing forming the Black Repartition.

== Program ==
The formation of Land and Liberty, in Saint Petersburg in 1876, was preceded by the analysis of the "Going to the People" campaign (Хождение в народ, or Khozhdeniye v narod) of 1873-1875. As a result, the members of Land and Liberty defined the basics of the political platform, which would be called narodnicheskaya (народническая, or "close to the people", populist). They admitted a possibility of a special, non-capitalist way of development of Russia with the peasantry as its basis. The members of Land and Liberty considered it necessary to adapt the purposes and slogans of the movement to independent revolutionary aspirations that had already existed among the peasants, as they believed. The program proclaimed the ideal of "anarchy and collectivism" and its requirements, generalized in the slogan "Land and Liberty!", were designed to allow for the even distribution of all the lands "into the hands of the rural working strata", "full communal self-management" and division of the Russian Empire into parts "in accordance with the desires of the locals".

The Program of Land and Liberty also envisioned a course of actions, aimed at "disorganization of the state", in its members' opinion. In particular, it allowed for physical elimination of "the most harmful or prominent members of the government". The most famous terrorist act of Land and Liberty was the assassination of the Chief of the Gendarmes Nikolai Mezentsov in 1878.

The members of Land and Liberty saw the peasantry as the principal revolutionary force, as opposed to the working class, which would have to play a part of the "second fiddle". Proceeding from the inevitability of a "forced coup d'état", the revolutionaries considered agitation and organization of revolts, demonstrations and strikes to be very important. Land and Liberty represented a "rebellious" current of the revolutionary movement of the 1870s. Vladimir Lenin said that Land and Liberty’s "striving to enlist all the discontented in the organisation and to direct this organisation to resolute struggle against the autocracy … that was its great historical merit."

== See also ==
- Nihilist movement

== Bibliography ==
- Baron, Samuel Haskell (1966). Plekhanov : the father of Russian Marxism. Stanford University Press. OCLC 22292388.
- Trapeznik, Alexander (2007). V. M. Chernov: theorist, leader, politician. Newcastle upon Tyne: Cambridge Scholars Press. ISBN 9781847180865. OCLC 237024014.
- Yarmolinsky, Avrahm (2014) [1956]. "Land and Liberty". Road to Revolution: A Century of Russian Radicalism. Princeton, New Jersey: Princeton University Press. ISBN 978-0691610412. OCLC 890439998.
