= Alexander Soloviev (revolutionary) =

Russian revolutionary

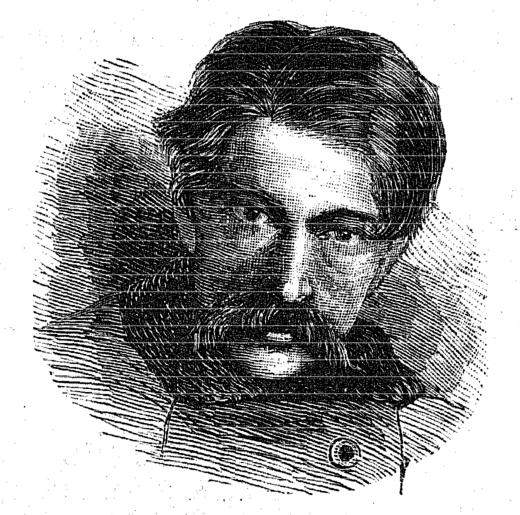
Alexander Soloviev by an unknown artist, from Světozor (1879)

Alexander Konstantinovich Soloviev (Russian: Александр Константинович Соловьев; 18 August 1846 – 28 May 1879), was a Russian revolutionary and former student who unsuccessfully attempted to assassinate Tsar Alexander II of Russia.

Soloviev was born in Luga. He worked as a teacher, but complained later that all his pupils were children of the bourgeoisie, or of government officials, so resigned in 1874 to "go to the people" in the hope that he would improve the lives of Russian peasants. He worked as a railway carpenter, then went from village to village looking for work, hoping to spread propaganda, but was hit by the rising unemployment that followed the Russo-Turkish War.

On his return to St Petersburg, Soloviev told his friend Alexander Mikhailov that he proposed to kill the Tsar. When Mikhailov reported this to fellow members of the Land and Liberty society, it set off a furious argument, in which Georgi Plekhanov, the future founder of Russian Marxism, and possibly a majority of those present, argued that Soloviev should be stopped, but Mikhailov told them that it was useless to argue because Soloviev had made up his mind.

Soloviev also visited Saratov to discuss his plan with young rebels there, who had been trying to improve the living conditions of the peasants by offering medical advice and education. They included Vera Figner, who agreed that the Russian authorities would never allow them to continue this philanthropic work without being harassed or arrested. Soloviev told her it was "mere self-gratification, when one considered the existing order of things, under which the struggle for the interests of the masses on a legal foundation appeared iniquitous and illegal in the eyes of the law, of all property-holders, and members of the administration." He claimed that:

The death of the Emperor may bring about a turn in social life; the atmosphere will become purified; the intelligentsia will no longer be diffident, but will enter upon a broad an fruitful activity among the people. A great stream of honest young vitality and strength will flow into the countryside.

== Assassination attempt ==
On the morning of 2 April 1879, while Alexander II was taking his usual walk in the grounds of the Winter Palace, he spotted Soloviev with a revolver in his hands, and fled. Soloviev fired five times but missed. He resisted as the police guarding the Tsar overpowered him, wounding one of them. He swallowed poison he had brought with him, but was given medical treatment which revived him. Under interrogation, he avoided incriminating Mikhailov, who had watched the assassination attempt from a distance, or anyone else. Soloviev was hanged in front of a crowd of about 70,000 on 28 May 1879 (in Julian calendar; 9 June 1879, in Gregorian calendar).

Soloviev had acted on his own, but his action precipitated a split in the revolutionary movement. Mikhailov and others who supported the tactic of killing the Tsar formed the terrorist group Narodnaya Volya, while Plekhanov and others who opposed it formed the rival group Chernyi Peredel.

== See also ==
- Assassination attempts on Alexander II
