= Lev Tikhomirov =

Russian revolutionary and author

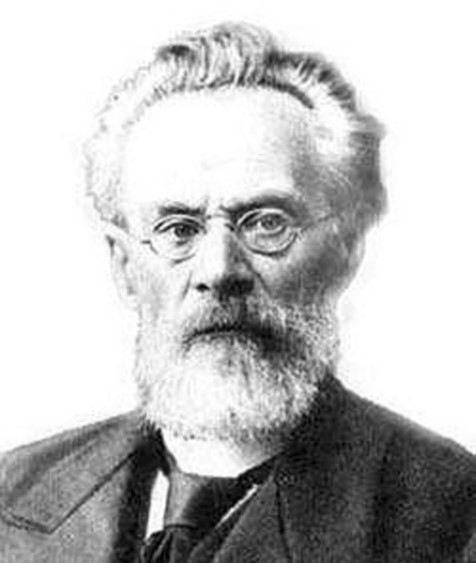
L. Tikhomirov.

Lev Alexandrovich Tikhomirov (Russian: Лев Александрович Тихомиров; 19 January 1852, Gelendzhik – 10 October 1923, Sergiyev Posad), originally a Russian revolutionary and one of the members of the Executive Committee of the Narodnaya Volya, following his disenchantment with violent revolution became one of the leading conservative thinkers in Russia. He authored several books on monarchism, Orthodoxy, and Russian political philosophy.

== Revolutionary ==
Lev Tikhomirov was born in Gelendzhik on 19 January 1852 to a military doctor and his wife, a graduate of the Institute for the Education of Noble Maidens. Despite receiving a conservative education, he came under the influence of radical ideas and became involved in the Narodniki movement. In 1873, Tikhomirov was arrested in connection with the Trial of the 193 and sentenced to a four-year term in St Petersburg's Sts Peter and Paul Fortress.

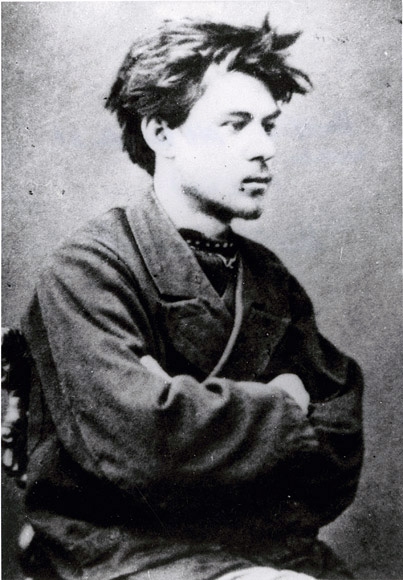
Tikhomirov in his early years

By 1878, Tikhomirov became one of the leaders of the Land and Liberty organization. In August 1879, when Land and Liberty split into two factions as the result of a dispute over organizational tactics, he joined its most radical of the two successors, the People's Will.

In 1882, following the assassination of Emperor Alexander II, Tikhomirov emigrated to Switzerland and then to France. In France, however, he began to reconsider his views writing in 1886:

From henceforth our only hope is Russia and the Russian people. We have nothing to gain from the revolutionaries ... In light of this, I have begun to reconsider my life. I must now build it in such a way so as to serve Russia according to the dictates of my conscience, independent of all parties.

In 1888, Tikhomirov publicly repented of his revolutionary activities, publishing his book Why I am No Longer a Revolutionary. The same year he petitioned to be allowed to return to Russia, a petition granted by Alexander III.

In commenting on his earlier life, Tikhomirov wrote in his memoirs:

I do not like my youth. It is full of the passioned desires of a corrupt heart, full of impurity, full of a stupid pride, a pride of someone who, while realizing his potential, has not yet matured to analytical thinking or independence of thought. I only begin to like my life from that point (in my last years in Paris), when I matured and was liberated ... began to understand the meaning of life, began to seek God.

== Conservative Thinker ==
Following his return from exile, Tikhomirov became one of the leading conservative thinkers of the Russian Empire. He authored several works criticizing liberal democracy, including "Liberals and Terrorists" (1890) and "Liberal and Social Democracy" (1896). He criticized democratic institutions for being controlled by party intrigue and for excessive individualism. He advocated finding a Russian alternative to the democratic idea, writing:

We must seek other ways, understanding that great truth, which is now apparent given the negative experiences of the "new era": that organizing a society is only possible by keeping the spiritual balance in every man. And this spiritual balance comes from a living religious ideology.

In 1905, Tikhomirov authored his largest work, the four-volume On Monarchist Statehood, which quickly became the ideological basis for the Russian monarchist movement. In it he asserted the existence of authority as a fundamental regulatory force in society. The type of authority - democratic, aristocratic, or monarchic - is rooted to the moral and psychological state of the society. Tikhomirov wrote:

If a powerful moral ideal exists in a society, an ideal calling all to voluntary obedience to, and service of, one another, then it brings about monarchy because the existence of this ideal negates the need for physical force (democracy) or the rule of an elite (aristocracy). All that is necessary is the continual expression of this moral ideal. The most capable vehicle for this expression is one individual placed in a position of complete independence from all external political forces.

In 1909, Tikhomirov became the editor of the State-owned monarchist newspaper Moskovskie Vedomosti. However, in 1913 the Interior Ministry suspended funding for the paper and Tikhomirov resigned as its editor. He then moved to Sergiev Posad, where he wrote his second largest work, On the Religious and Philosophical Fundamentals of History.

In the Fundamentals of History, Tikhomirov argued that history is driven by two competing world views: the dualistic and the monistic. The dualistic recognizes the existence of God and the world created by God. The monistic asserts that the world has always existed of its own self. Tikhomirov then traces through all of history as the continual struggle of these two views, which will culminate at the apocalyptic end.

Following the Russian Revolution of 1917, Tikhomirov worked as a school secretary in Sergiev Posad. He died on 10 October 1923.
