= Mark Natanson =

Russian revolutionary (1851–1919)

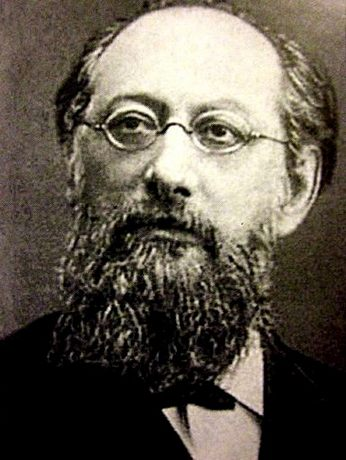
- Born: Mark Andreyevich Natanson; 6 January 1851; Švenčionys, Vilna Governorate, Russian Empire
- Died: 29 July 1919 (aged 68); Bern, Switzerland
- Occupations: Revolutionary; political activist
- Family: Alexander Berkman (nephew)

Mark Andreyevich Natanson (Russian: Марк Андре́евич Натансо́н; party name: Bobrov; 25 December 1850 (N.S. 6 January 1851) – 29 July 1919) was a Russian revolutionary who was one of the founders of the Circle of Tchaikovsky, Land and Liberty and the Socialist-Revolutionary Party. In 1917, he was a leader of the Left Socialist-Revolutionaries, which supported the Bolsheviks during the October Revolution. He was the uncle of Alexander Berkman.

== Early life ==
Natanson was born in 1850 in Švenčionys in the Russian Empire (present-day Lithuania) to a Lithuanian Jewish family. His parents died while he was still young and so he was brought up by his uncle. He graduated from the Kaunas men's grammar school in 1868, studied in St. Petersburg at the Medical and Surgical Academy (1868–1871) and then at the Institute of Agriculture (1871). Meanwhile, he became involved in radical student politics.

== Populist movement ==
Together with his first wife, he was one of the organizers of the populist Circle of Tchaikovsky. They opposed the 'nihilistic' tendency of Sergei Nechaev, who believed that any means were acceptable for achieving revolutionary goals. The Circle of Tchaikovsky, on the contrary, preached high morality and self-improvement. In 1869–1871, he was arrested and imprisoned in the Peter and Paul Fortress, and in 1872 he was exiled to the Arkhangelsk province. In the same 1872 he converted to Orthodoxy in order to formally marry the noblewoman Olga Alexandrovna Shleisner who followed him into exile.

In 1876, Natanson returned to Petrograd. He organized the escape abroad of Peter Kropotkin, a comrade from the Circle of Tchaikovsky. In the same year, he began work on the unification of the Narodnik circles into a single revolutionary organization, which in 1878 was called "Land and Liberty." In December 1876, together with Georgi Plekhanov, he organized a demonstration in Kazan square. In 1877, he was once again arrested and, after serving his term in the Peter and Paul Fortress, he was exiled to Eastern Siberia. Upon returning from exile in 1889, he settled in Saratov, where he got a job on the local railway.

After 'Land and Liberty' split, he once again began work on the unification of disparate revolutionary circles. He set himself the goal of uniting the populist, social democratic and liberal movements in the Russian liberation movement. In September 1893, at the constituent congress in Saratov, a single party, 'The People's Will' (Narodnaya Volya), was created. The organization's headquarters were in Oryol and they ran a printing house in Smolensk, which printed the group's manifesto and revolutionary brochures. Narodnaya Volya favoured agitation among urban workers and intellectuals, rather than spreading propaganda among the peasants (a tactic adopted by the other offshoot of 'Land and Liberty', the 'Black Repartition' group). Narodnaya Volya also endorsed political terrorism as a tactic and in 1881, they assassinated Tsar Alexander II. Natanson was not directly involved in any terrorist act. In April 1894, Narodnaya Volya was liquidated by the police administrator Sergei Zubatov, and its leaders were arrested. In exile in Yakutsk, he married Varvara Alexandrova.

When a shipyard was organised for the construction of a ferry crossing on Lake Baikal, the Corps of Ship Engineers needed an experienced and honest accountant, and Natanson took the job. His merits in organizing the construction are confirmed by the fact that on June 17, 1899, at the gala dinner in honor of the launch of the icebreaker "Baikal", there was a toast pronounced in honor of the political exile.

== People's Rights Party ==
After his release he returned to European Russia and became active in Saratov, where in 1893, he founded the party People's Rights Party (Partiia Narodnogo Prava). Historian Shmuel Galai has argued that "for the first time in the annals of Russian parties, it declared organized public opinion to be the main weapon in the struggle against autocracy," in contradistinction to peasant revolt, general strike, or terror. However, the People's Rights Party proved to be a short-lived venture, as in 1894, Natanson was arrested again and banished to eastern Siberia for ten years. Natanson remained an active revolutionary even in Siberian exile, maintaining the party treasury and coordinating various organisational tasks.

Upon returning from exile, he lived in Baku, where he worked as an accountant in the city government. In 1904 he emigrated to Switzerland, where he met with Vladimir Ilyich Ulyanov. The Russian liberation movement had become permanently divided into social-democratic, liberal and populist movements. In 1902, the followers of the Narodniks united into the Party of Socialist Revolutionaries. After some hesitation, Nathanson joined the Socialist Revolutionaries and became one of their leaders. The successful assassination of the Minister of the Interior Vyacheslav von Plehve, Natanson began to support the terrorist tactics of the Socialist Revolutionaries.

The tactical position adopted by the SRs represented a compromise between the rural agitation favoured by South Russian and Ukrainian populists, the factory organisation favoured by the People's Rights Party and the terrorist tactics embraced by the remnants of 'The People's Will' and some of the revolutionary groups of Moscow and Petrograd. In September 1904, together with Viktor Chernov and Yevno Azef, he negotiated with Plekhanov, Ulyanov and other social democrats in order to convince them to take part in the common cause. During the 1905 Russian Revolution, Natanson moved to Finland. At the first congress of the Socialist-Revolutionary Party in early 1906, he was elected a member of the Party Central Committee. After the revolution was put down, he returned to exile in Switzerland.

Natanson still held a reserved position in relation to the party's terrorist tactics. In 1906, he was an opponent of the assassination of George Gapon, the decision on which was made without his consent. At his insistence, the party refused to take responsibility for this murder. In 1907, he opposed the plan for the murder of Nicholas II, developed by Azef and Grigory Gershuni. However, in 1908, when Vladimir Burtsev began a campaign to expose Azef as an agent provocateur, Nathanson defended Azef. Until the very end, he refused to believe in Azef's cooperation with the secret police. In his memoirs, Burtsev wrote that Natanson was the most evil of his opponents.

== Years of exile ==
When the First World War broke out in 1914, the SRs, like most other European socialist parties, split into those who supported a war of 'national defence' ('Defencists') and those who opposed the war ('Internationalists'). Natanson sided with the 'Internationalists' and attended the international socialist peace conferences such as the Zimmerwald Conference and one at Kienthal in Switzerland, signing the conference's manifestoes on behalf of the SR Internationalists.

== Founder of Left SRs ==
After the February Revolution broke out, Natanson returned to Russia through German territory "in a sealed wagon", as did Lenin. He became one of the most prominent leaders of the left wing of the SRs, which became increasingly disenchanted with the Provisional Government and with Alexander Kerensky and sharply criticised the defensive position of the SR central committee. Natanson advocated the "deepening" of the revolution, the transfer of all land to peasants and of power to the soviets. Natanson and the "Left SRs" supported the October Revolution, which caused a split in the Socialist Revolutionary Party. In November 1917, he initiated the creation of the party of Left Socialist-Revolutionaries. At the first Left SR congress, he was elected to the Presidium, and then to the Central Committee of the new party.

The Left SRs rejected the Brest-Litovsk Treaty by which Imperial Germany imposed onerous terms on Russia in exchange for a separate peace with Russia. The Left SRs exited the Soviet government in protest, and some took up arms against the Bolsheviks. Natanson opposed this course, fearing that a defeat of the Soviet government would spell the end of the revolution and usher in a counter-revolution. He founded the Party of Revolutionary Communism, which supported the Bolsheviks and eventually merged with the Communist Party of the USSR. Natanson was a member of the Presidium of the All-Russian Central Executive Committee. However, Natanson's opposition to the anti-Bolshevik uprising of the Left SRs did not imply whole-hearted acceptance of the Bolsheviks' policies. In particular, he objected to Lenin's decision to ban all other political parties in the Soviet Union. In 1919, due to fear of arrest, he once again went into exile. “I have complete discord with Lenin ... I no longer believe in Lenin,” he told his relatives.

== Death ==
In July 1919, Mark Natanson died in Switzerland from complications of thromboembolism and purulent pneumonia after a surgical operation for a prostate tumor. He is buried in Bern.
