= Alexander Mikhailov (revolutionary) =

Russian revolutionary and populist

- Александр Михайлов
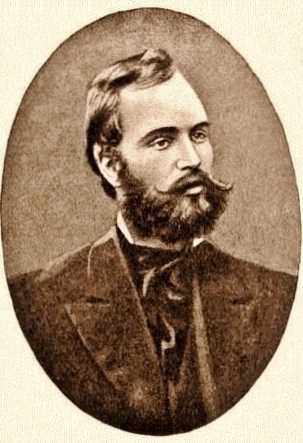
- Born: 29 January 1855; Putivl, Kursk Governorate, Russian Empire
- Died: 30 March 1884 (aged 29); Saint Petersburg, Russian Empire
- Occupations: Revolutionary, political activist

Aleksandr Dmitrievich Mikhailov (Russian: Алекса́ндр Дми́триевич Миха́йлов; 29 January [O.S. 17 January] 1855 – 30 March [O.S. 18 March] 1884) was a Russian revolutionary, populist and one of the co-founders of Zemlya i Volya and Narodnaya Volya.

== Biography ==
Mikhailov was born in Kursk in to a family of poor landowners. According to autobiographical note that he wrote in prison: "From the earliest days a happy star shone above me. My childhood was one of the happiest that a man can have." He entered St. Petersburg Polytechnic University but in the Autumn of 1875, he was expelled due to involvement in the revolutionary student movement and was sent back to Putivl. In December 1875, he moved to Kyiv, but was frustrated by the lack of unity or disciple among young radicals, who were divided between followers of Pyotr Lavrov and the anarchist, Mikhail Bakunin.

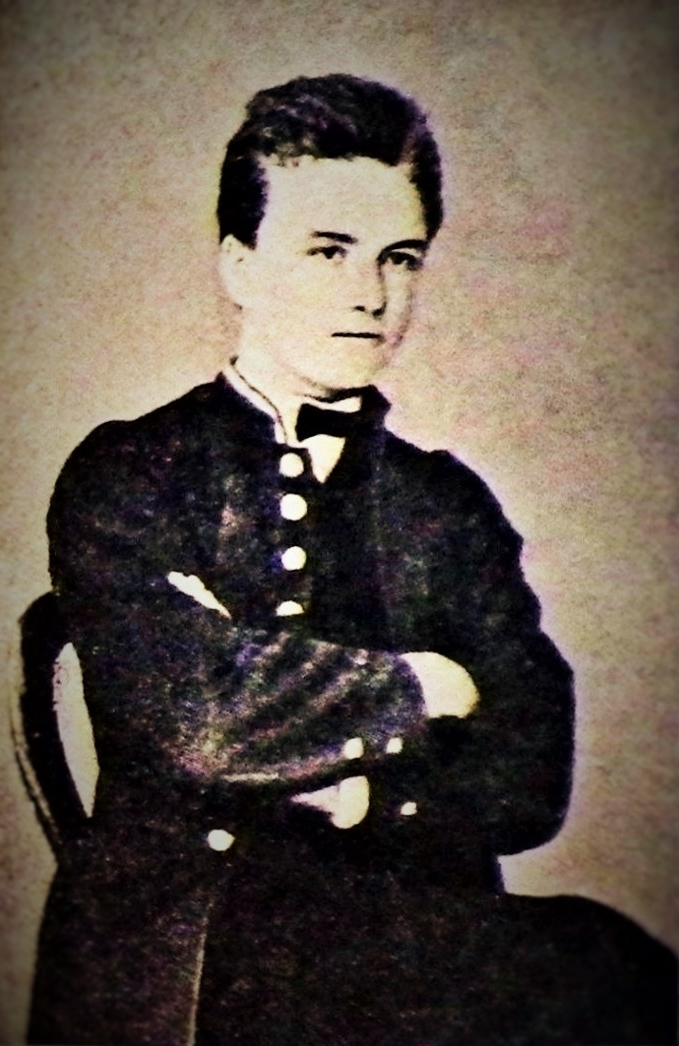
Mikhailov in his student years

In August 1876 he returned to St. Petersburg and entered the Mining Institute and became one of the active organizers of the Zemlya i volya ("Land and Liberty") society. He defined the organisation's programme as "the passage of land belonging both to the state and to private owners into the hand of the people", and "the substitution of the existing state by a structure determined by the will of the people", while the task of the educated revolutionaries was "to create an intelligent and strong opposition able to keep the banner flying from generation to generation" that would "prepare the people for the struggle to obtain what the state has seized from them in past centuries."

In 1878 he returned to St. Petersburg to rebuild Zemlya i volya, which had been almost destroyed by police raids and arrests. Mikhailov took charge of the finances, the production of false passports that enabled revolutionaries to live illegally, maintaining links with provincial members of the organisation and of the printing, editing and distribution of the society's illegal publication.

A talented organizer, he demanded strict discipline from his comrades, and developed an effective conspiracy system. He knew all the courtyards of St. Petersburg, for which he received the nickname "Janitor". In 1879, after the Lipetsk and Voronezh congresses, when the "Land and Liberty" split took place, he became a member of the Executive Committee of the People's Will (Narodnaya Volya). Mikhailov established the work of underground printing houses and dealt with party finances.

== Arrest and Death ==
In November 1880, Mikhailov visited a photographer's shop on the Nevsky Prospect in St Petersburg, to order photographs of Aleksandr Kvyatkovsky and Andrei Presnyakov, two former members of Narodnaya Volya who had been hanged. The owner's wife tried to warn Mikhailov that he was putting himself in danger by putting her hands around his neck. He told this story to comrades, who pleaded with him not to risk his life, but went back to the shop the next day and was arrested, after the owner had called the police.

Mikhailov was the lead defendant at the Trial of the 20 (also known as the Mikhailov trial) in February 1882. At the trial he delivered a speech in which he argued that the defendants were not a "gang of murderers" as the prosecutor presented it, but a party fighting for "raising the interests of the people above the interests of autocracy."

At first being sentenced to death, his sentence was commuted to eternal hard labour. He died in the Peter Paul Fortress at the age of 29 and was later secretly buried in the Preobrazhensky cemetery in St. Petersburg.

== Personality ==
Georgi Plekhanov, the founder of Russian Marxism, who knew Mikhailov before 1879, but refused to join Narodnaya volya, wrote a long tribute to him in 1882, saying:

I do not know if I will meet Mikhailov again, if he will serve the revolutionary cause, again or whether he will die in a forced-labour prison in spite of his iron character. But I am certain that all who know Mikhailov will never forget the image of this man who, like Lermontov’s Novice ‘knew the power of a single idea, and knew one flaming passion’: this thought was the happiness of our native land and this passion was the struggle for its liberation.
