= Kazan Cathedral, Saint Petersburg =

Orthodox cathedral in Saint Petersburg, Russia

Coordinates: 59.9343°N 30.3245°E

Kazan Cathedral Казанский кафедральный собор Kazanskiy kafedralnyy sobor
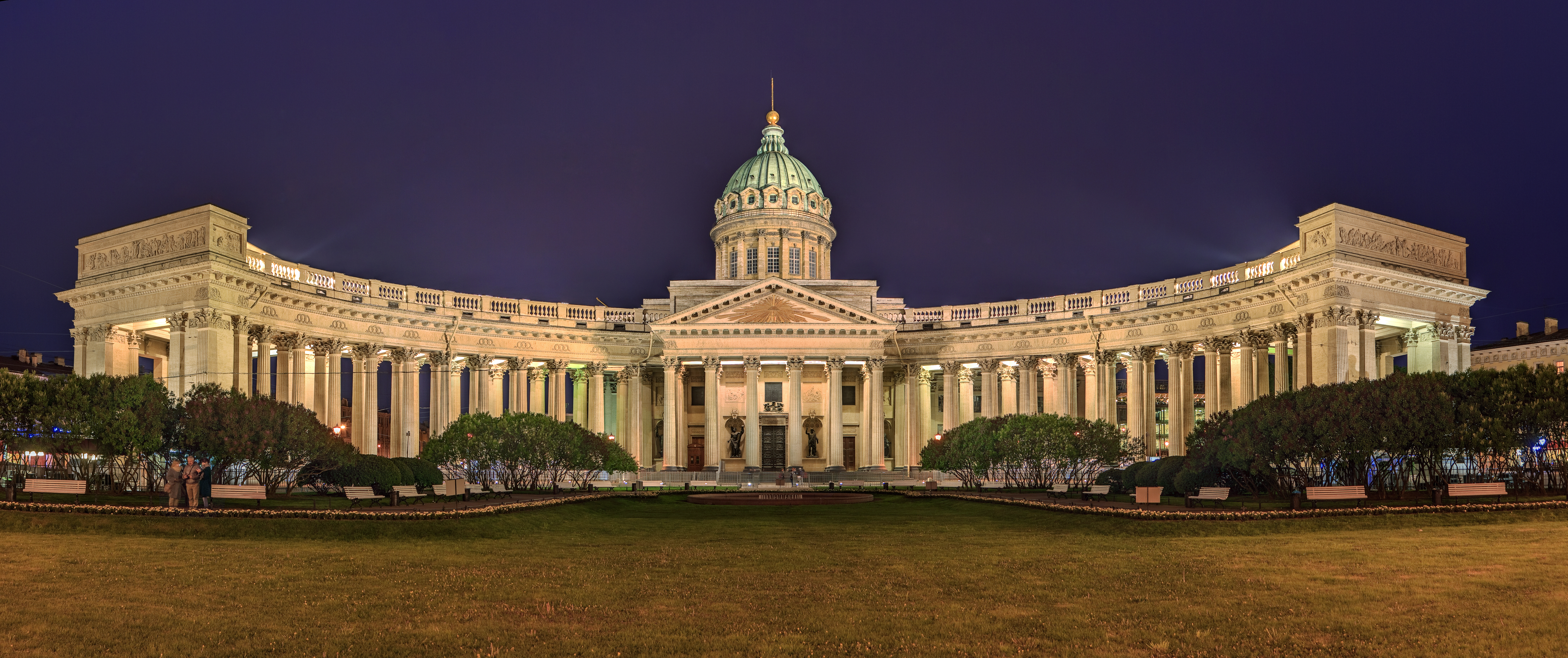
- Kazan Cathedral

Religion
- Affiliation: Russian Orthodox

Location
- Location: Nevsky Prospect 25, Saint Petersburg
- Interactive map of Kazan Cathedral; Казанский кафедральный собор Kazanskiy kafedralnyy sobor

Architecture
- Architect: Andrey Voronikhin
- Style: Empire
- Completed: 1811

Specifications
- Length: 82.5 m (271 ft)
- Width: 86 m (282 ft)
- Interior area: 4,000 m^{2} (interior); 6,200 m^{2} (exterior)
- Height (max): 71.6 m (top cross)

Website
- kazansky-spb.ru

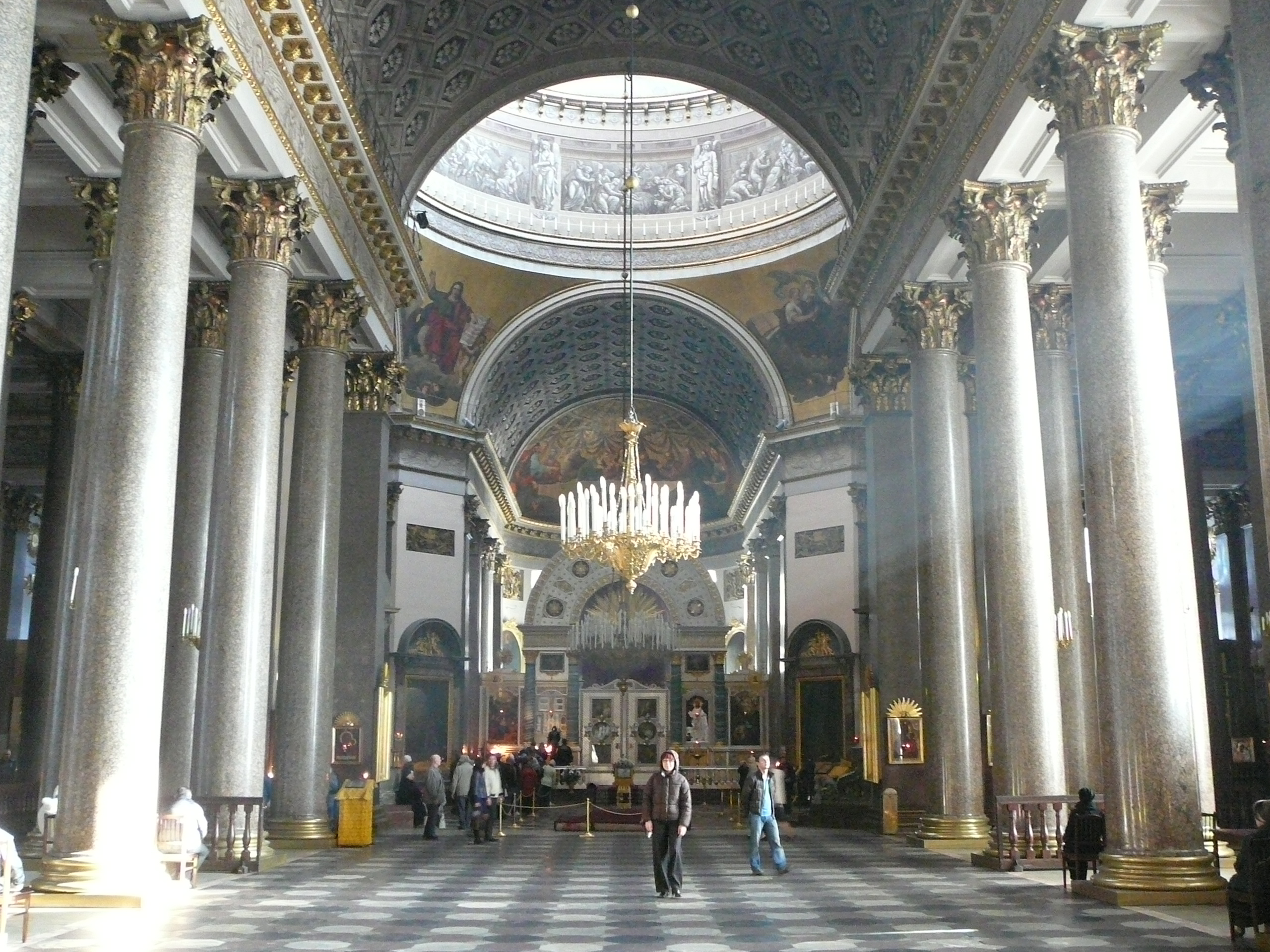
Interior view

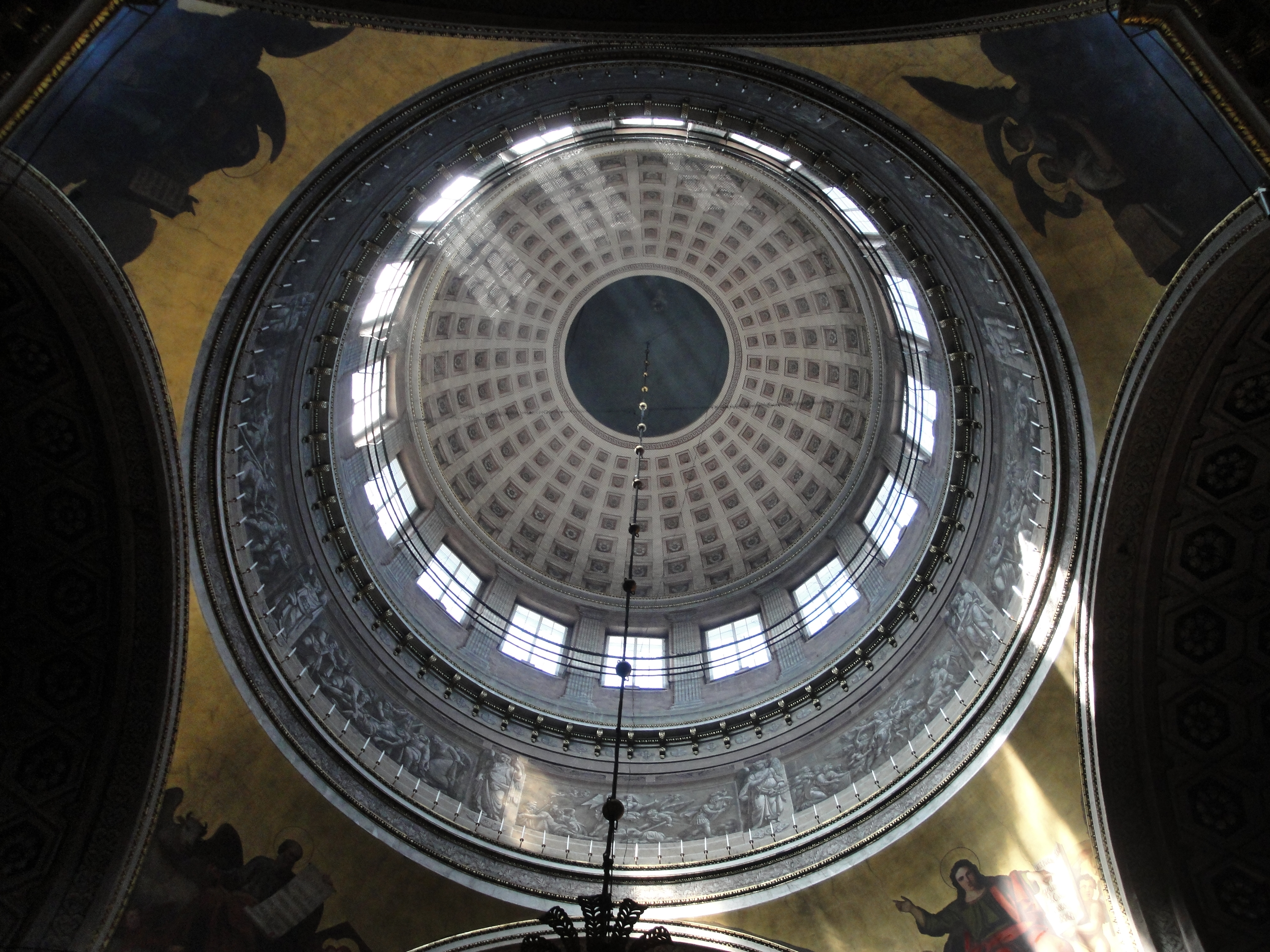
Interior view of the dome

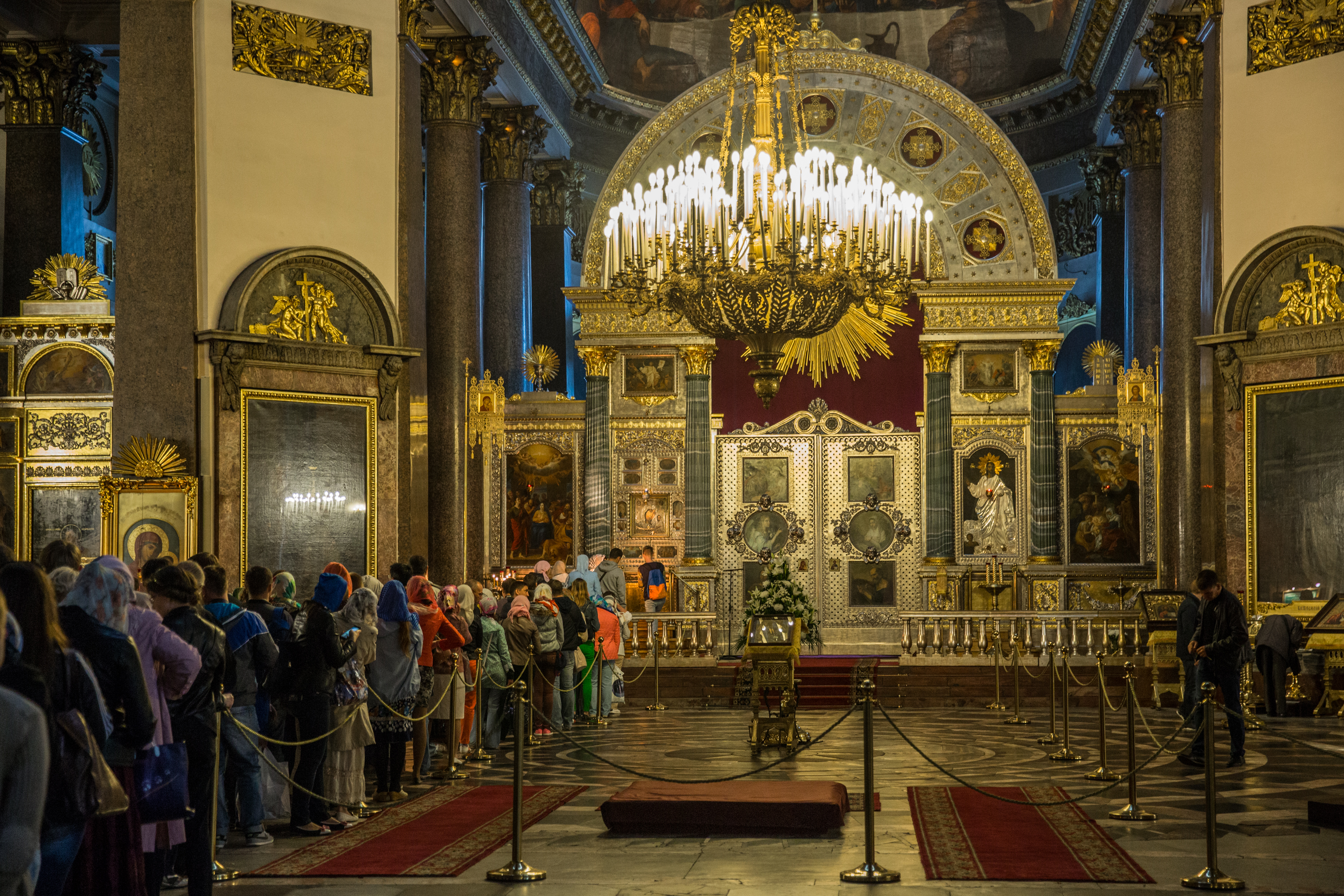
Interior, people at the iconostasis

Kazan Cathedral (Russian: Казанский кафедральный собор, romanized: Kazanskiy kafedral'nyy sobor), also known as the Cathedral of Our Lady of Kazan, is a cathedral of the Russian Orthodox Church on the Nevsky Prospekt in Saint Petersburg. It is dedicated to Our Lady of Kazan, one of the most venerated icons in Russia.

== Background ==
Construction of the cathedral started in 1801 and continued for ten years under the supervision of Alexander Sergeyevich Stroganov. Upon its completion in 1811, the new church replaced the Church of Nativity of the Theotokos, which was disassembled when the Kazan Cathedral was consecrated.

The architect Andrey Voronikhin modelled the building on St. Peter's Basilica in Rome. Some art historians assert that Emperor Paul (reigned 1796–1801) intended to build a similar church on the other side of Nevsky Prospect that would mirror the Kazan Cathedral, but such plans failed to materialize. Although the Russian Orthodox Church strongly disapproved of the plans to create a replica of a Catholic basilica in Russia's then capital, several courtiers supported Voronikhin's Empire Style design.

After Napoleon invaded Russia (1812) and the commander-in-chief General Mikhail Kutuzov asked Our Lady of Kazan for help, the church's purpose altered. The Patriotic War over, Russians saw the cathedral primarily as a memorial to their victory over Napoleon. Kutuzov himself was interred in the cathedral in 1813; and Alexander Pushkin wrote celebrated lines meditating over his sepulchre. In 1815 keys to seventeen cities and eight fortresses were brought by the victorious Russian army from Europe and placed in the cathedral's sacristy. In 1837, Boris Orlovsky designed two bronze statues of Kutuzov and of Barclay de Tolly which stand in front of the cathedral.

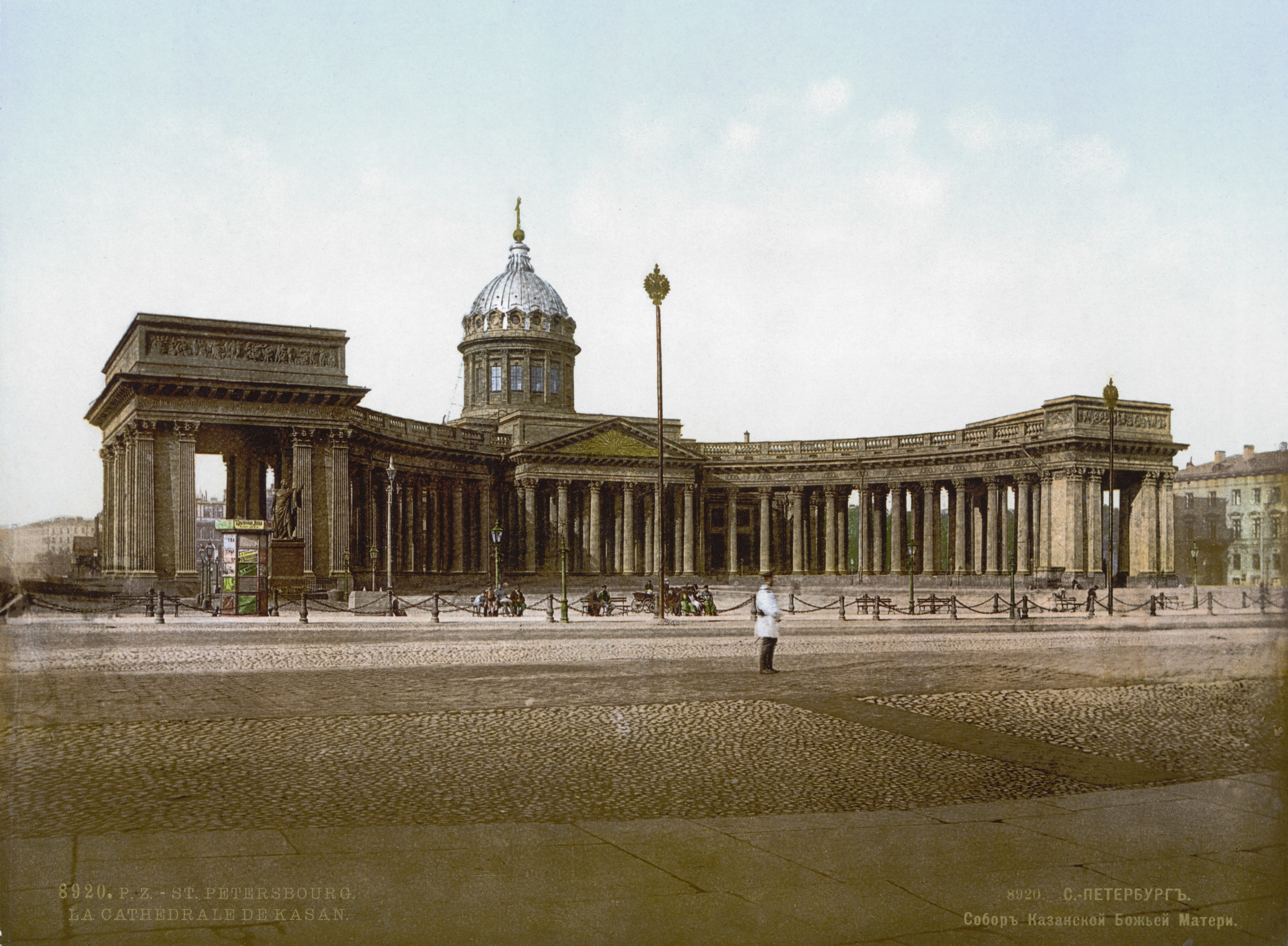
1896 Photochrom print

In 1876 the Kazan demonstration, the first political demonstration in Russia, took place in front of the church. It later became a focal point of student demonstrations against the Tsarist autocracy, following the self-immolation of Maria Vetrova in 1897. After the Russian Revolution of 1917 the authorities closed the cathedral (January 1932). In November 1932 it reopened as the pro-Marxist "Museum of the History of Religion and Atheism". or, as one contemporary writer put it, "Leningrad's largest antireligious museum", complete with Spanish Inquisition waxworks. Services resumed in 1992, and four years later the cathedral was returned to the Russian Orthodox Church. As of 2017 it functions as the mother cathedral of the metropolis of St. Petersburg.

The cathedral's interior, with its numerous columns, echoes the exterior colonnade and is reminiscent of a palatial hall, being 69 metres in length and 62 metres in height. The interior features numerous sculptures and icons created by the best Russian artists of the day. A wrought-iron grille separating the cathedral from a small square behind it is sometimes cited as one of the finest ever constructed.

The cathedral's huge bronze doors are one of four copies of the original doors of the Baptistery in Florence, Italy (the other three are at Grace Cathedral in San Francisco, United States, at the Nelson-Atkins Museum of Art in Kansas City, United States, and at the Florence Baptistery itself).

The Kazan Cathedral is considered to be the model for the neoclassical style of Helsinki Cathedral, one of the most iconic landmarks of Helsinki, Finland.

== Iconostasis ==
The royal doors of the central iconostasis contain 6 paintings, each of them depicting a different biblical character. The left door contains the portraits of St Luke the Evangelist, the Archangel Gabriel and St Matthew the Evangelist. The right door depicts St Mark the Evangelist, the Virgin Mary and St John the Evangelist. They were painted by Vladimir Borovikovsky.

Left door

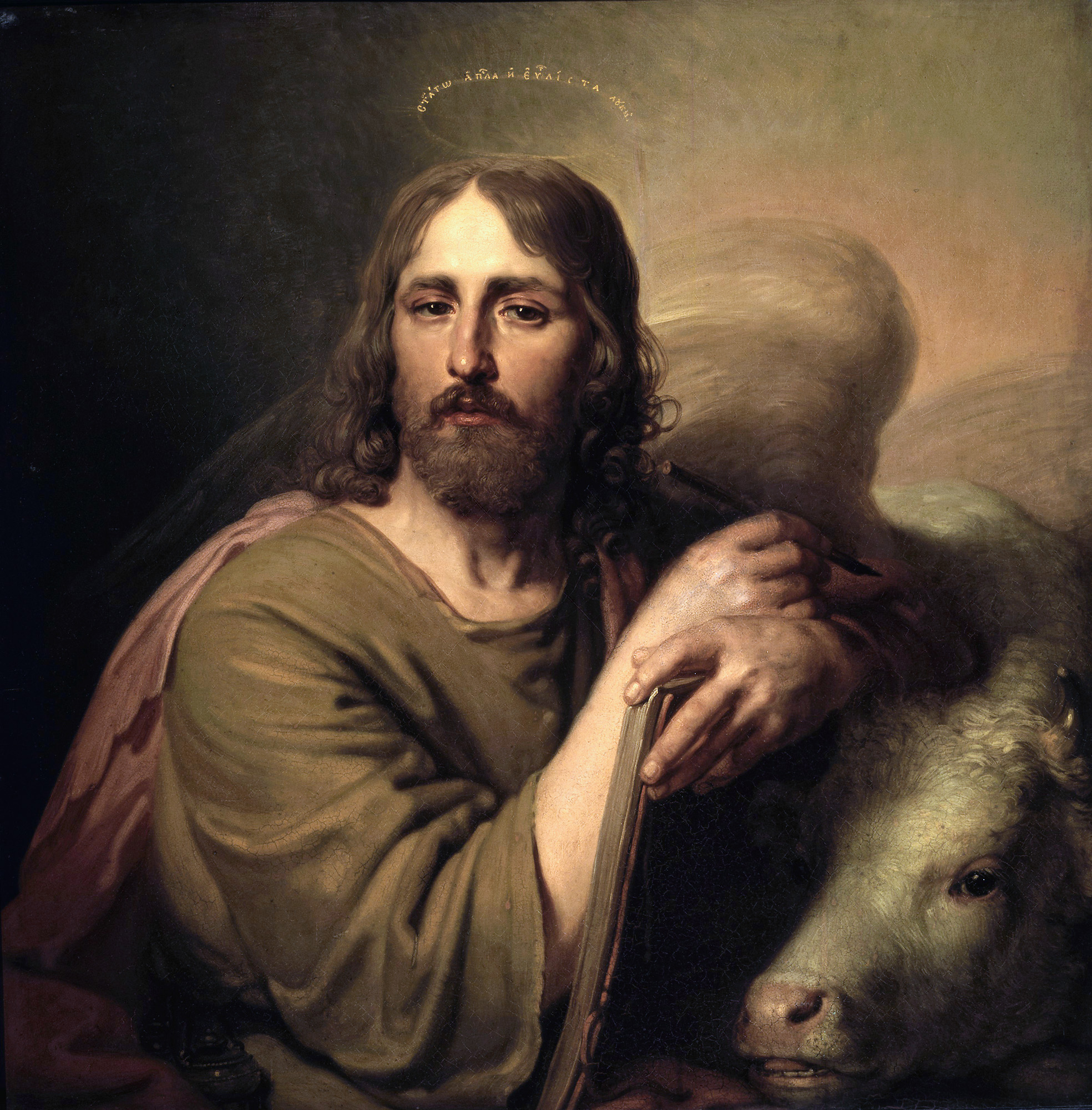
St Luke the Evangelist

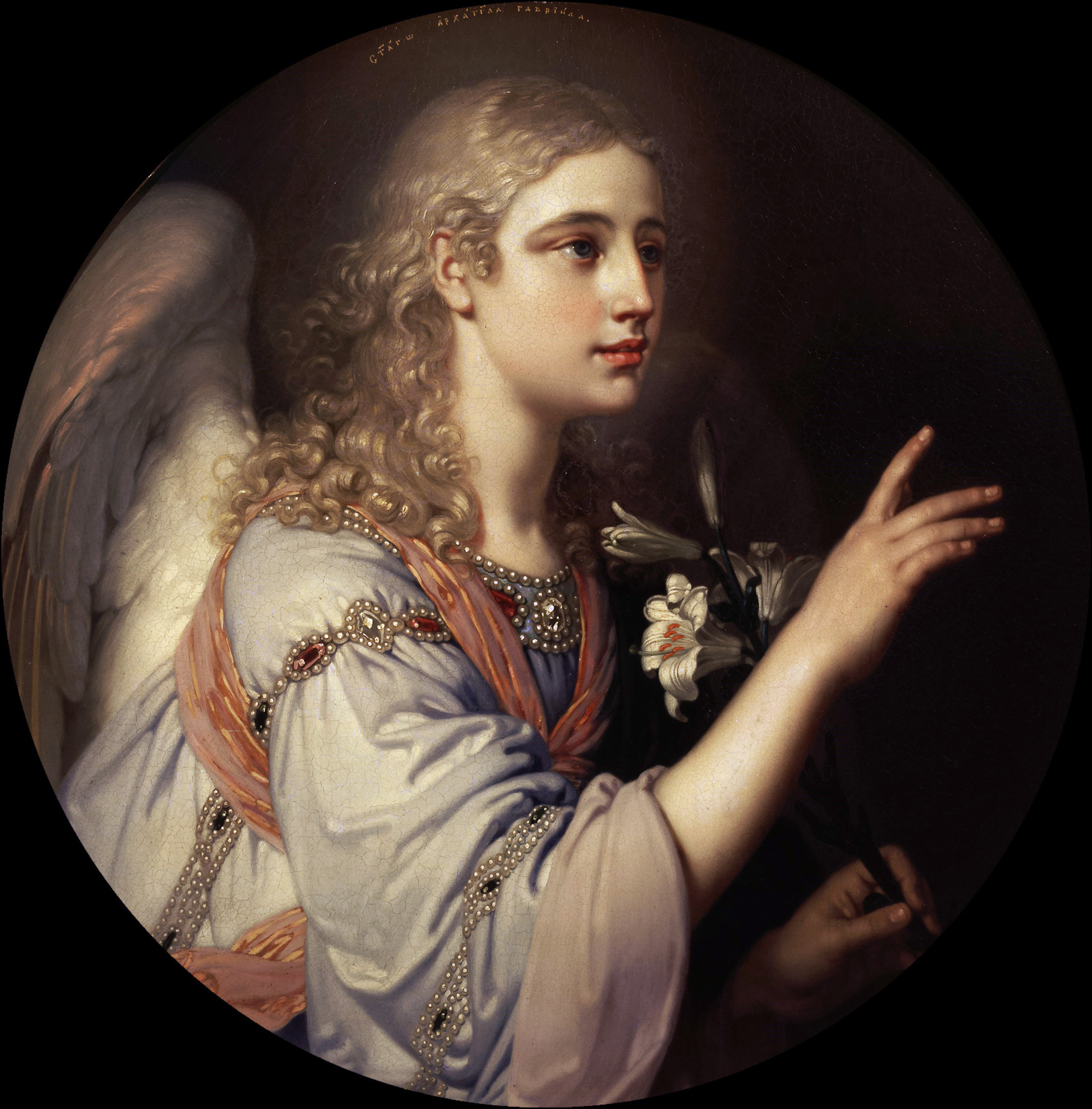
The Archangel Gabriel from the Annunciation

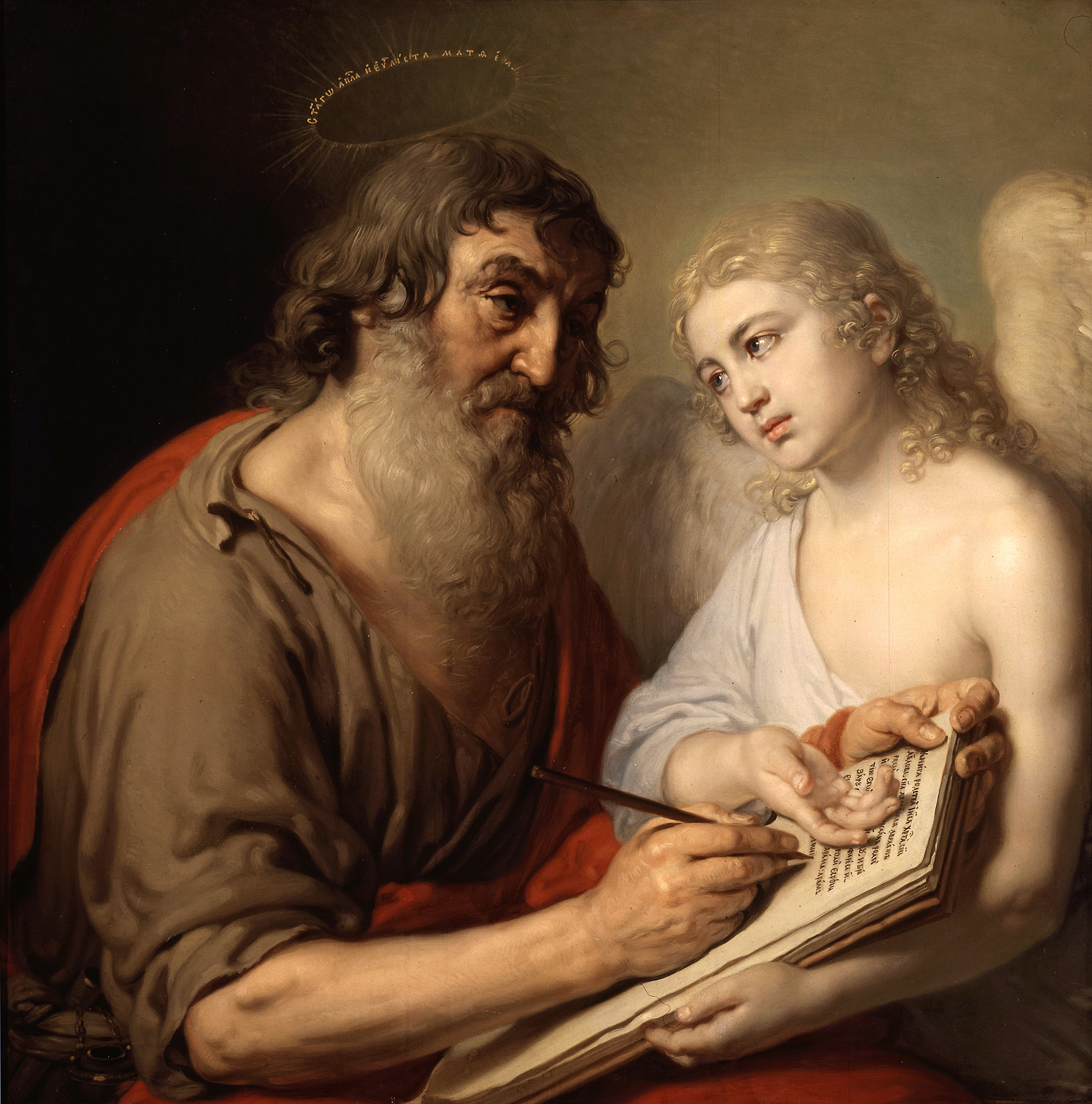
St Matthew the Evangelist
Right door

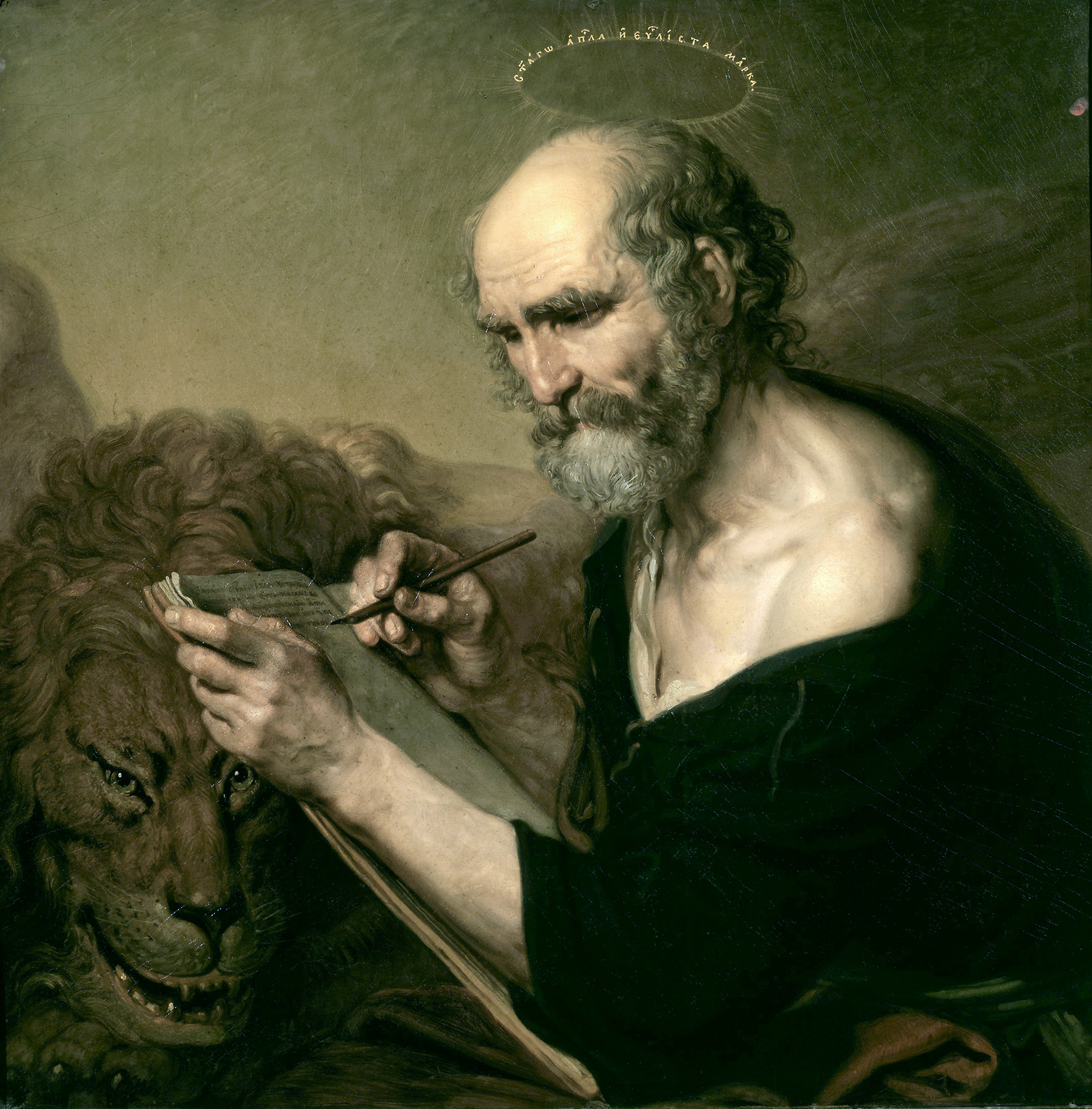
St Mark the Evangelist

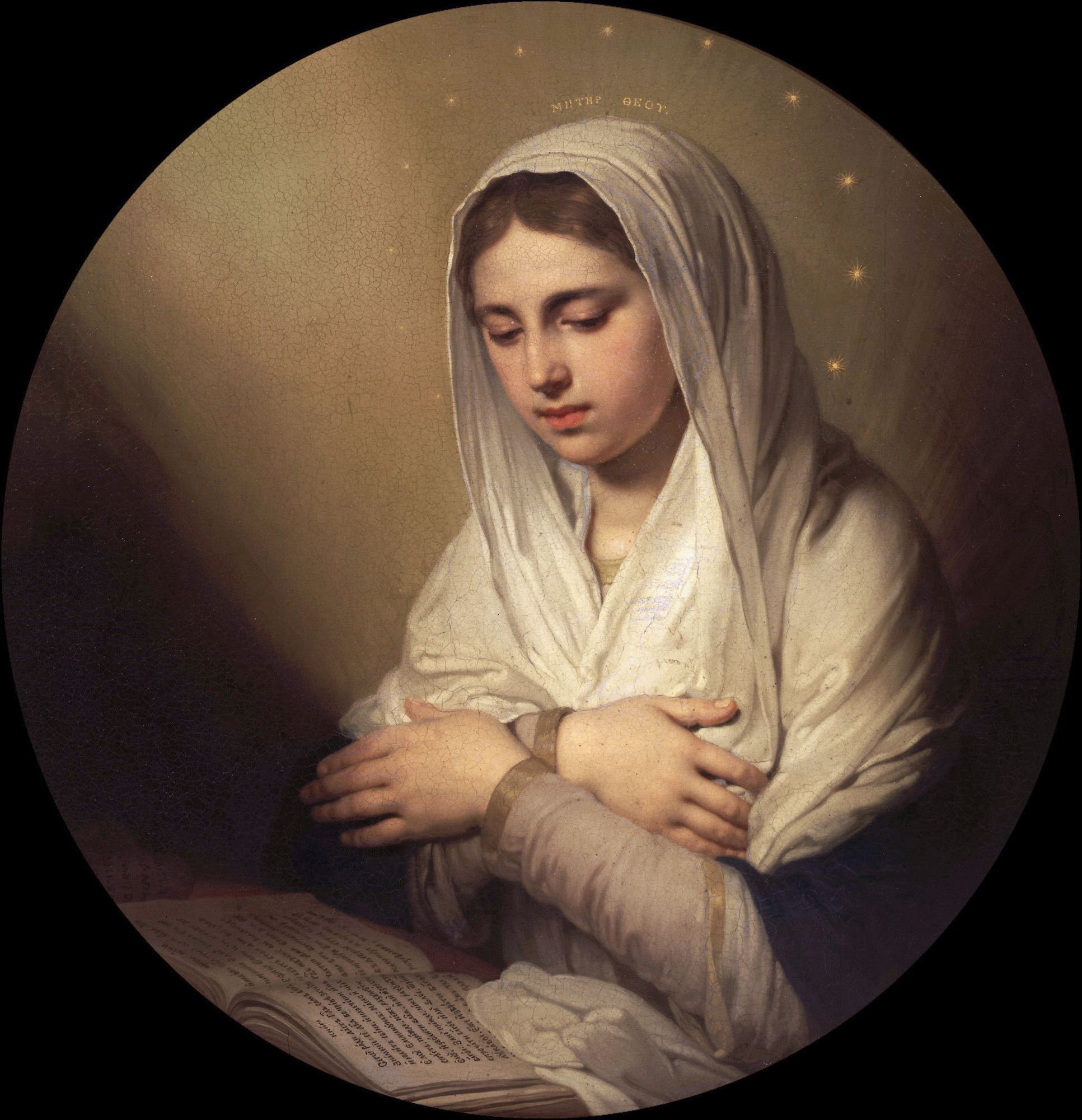
The Virgin Mary from the Annunciation

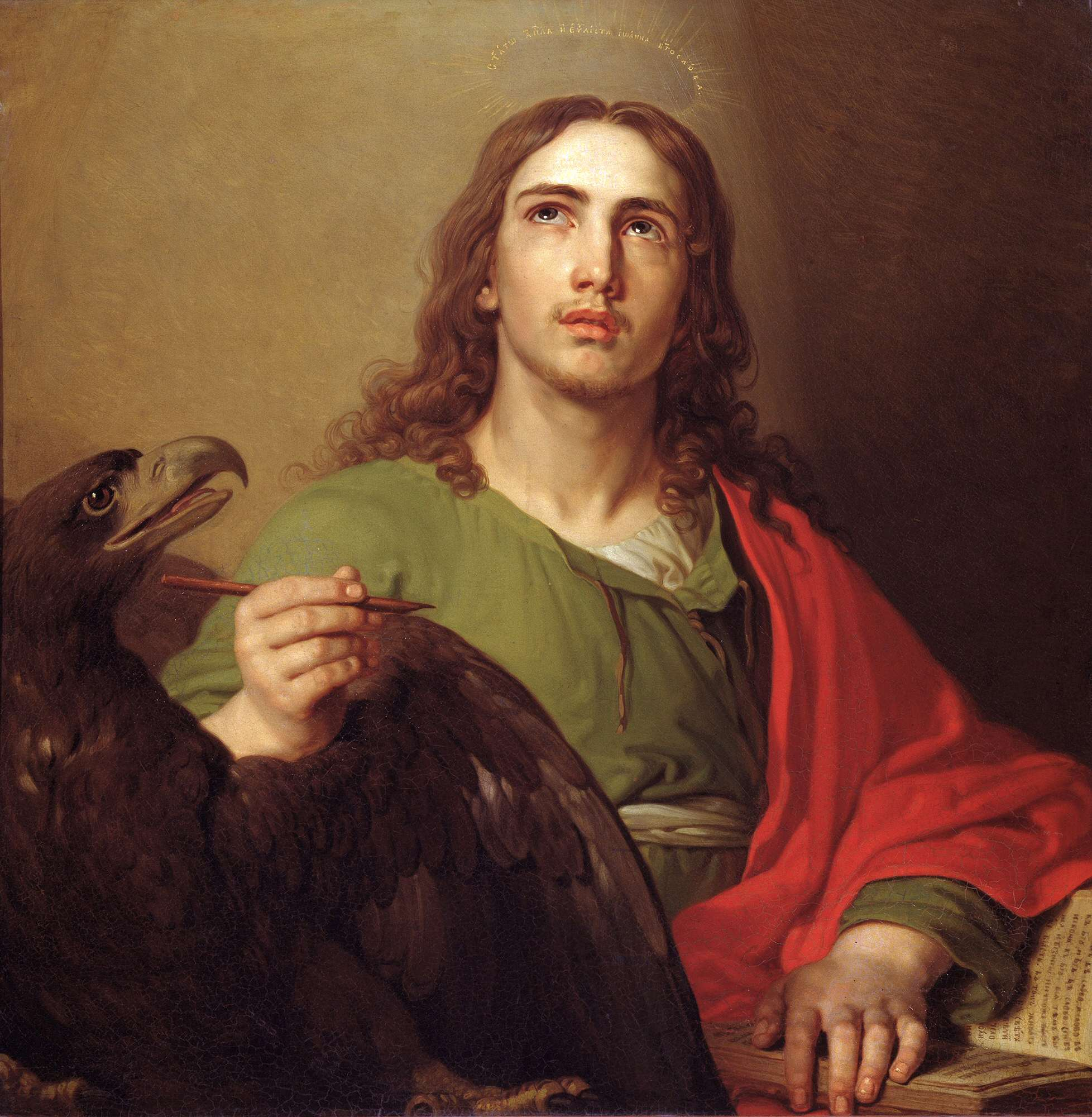
St John the Evangelist

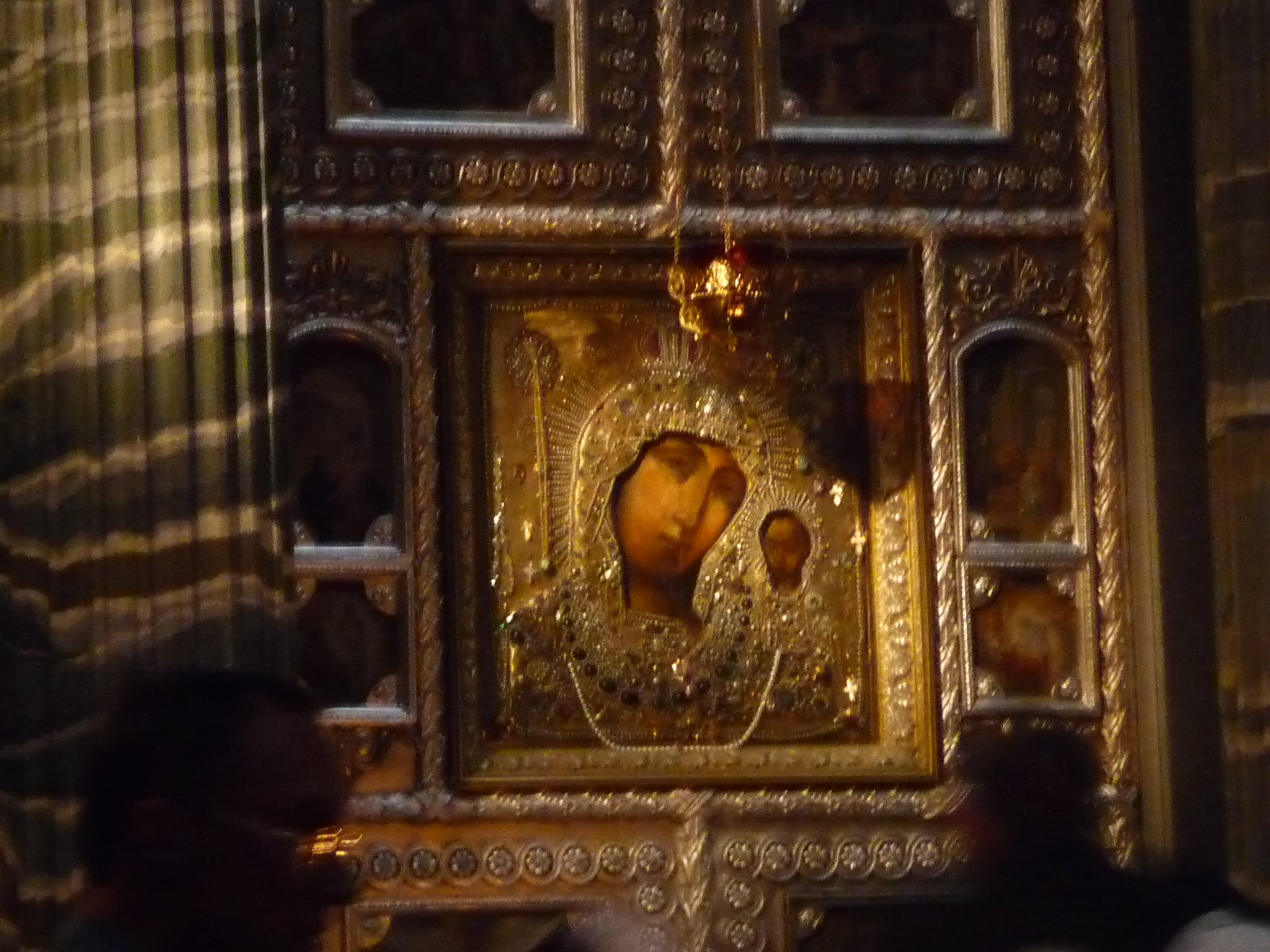
18th-century copy of the Kazan icon of the Mother of God

To the left of the royal doors is the miraculous 18th-century copy of the Kazan icon of the Mother of God, painted by order of Praskovia Saltykova and brought by her to St. Petersburg from Moscow in 1708. After a long stay in the Church of the Nativity of the Virgin on Nevsky Prospect, the icon was enshrined in the new Kazan Cathedral in 1811. After its closure in 1932, the icon was saved, and after staying in other churches around the city in the late 1930s, it was transferred in 1940 to Saint Vladimir Cathedral. In 2001, the icon was returned to Kazan Cathedral and installed on the iconostasis to the left of the royal doors.

== Gallery ==
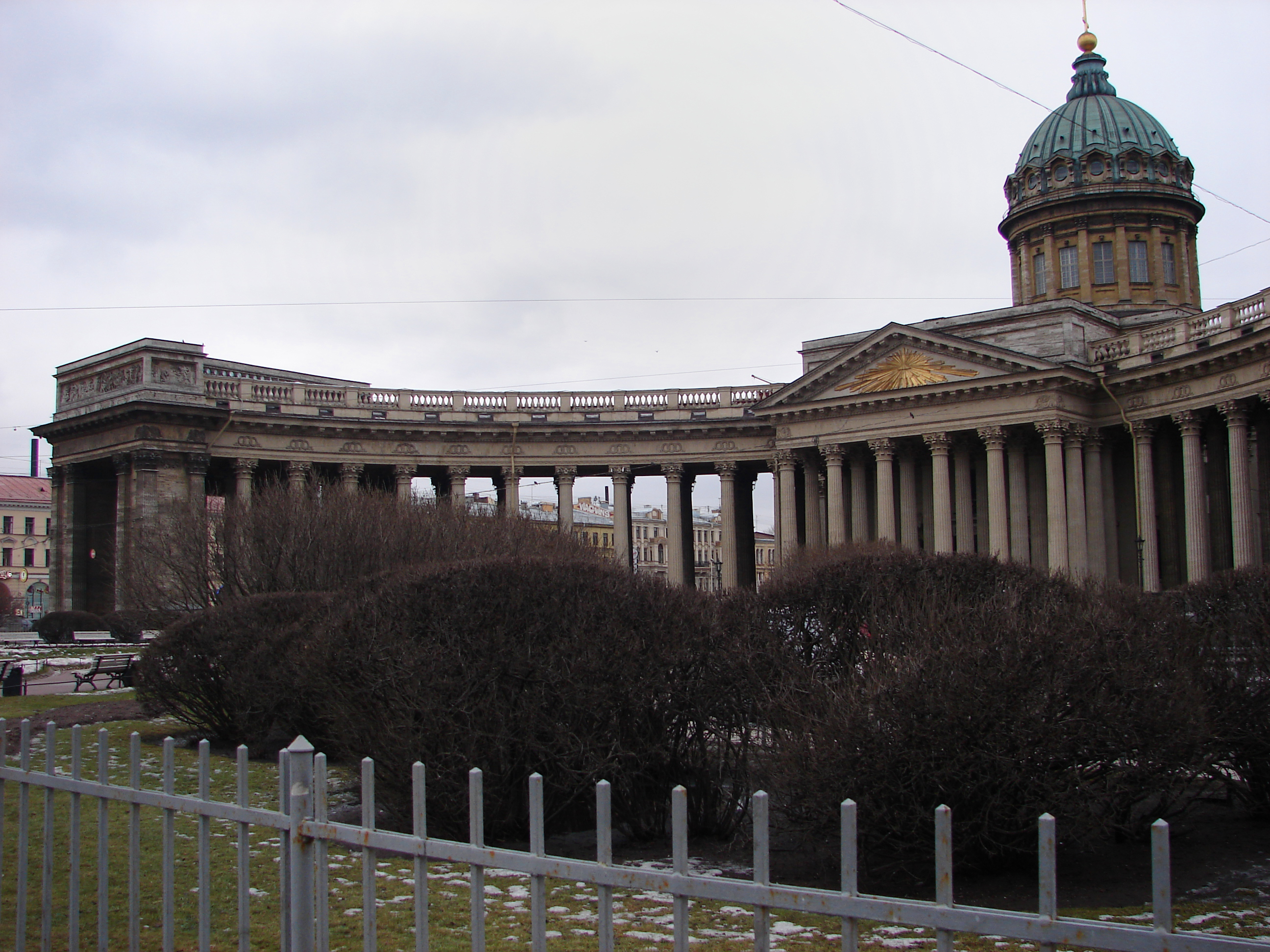
Exterior of Kazan Cathedral

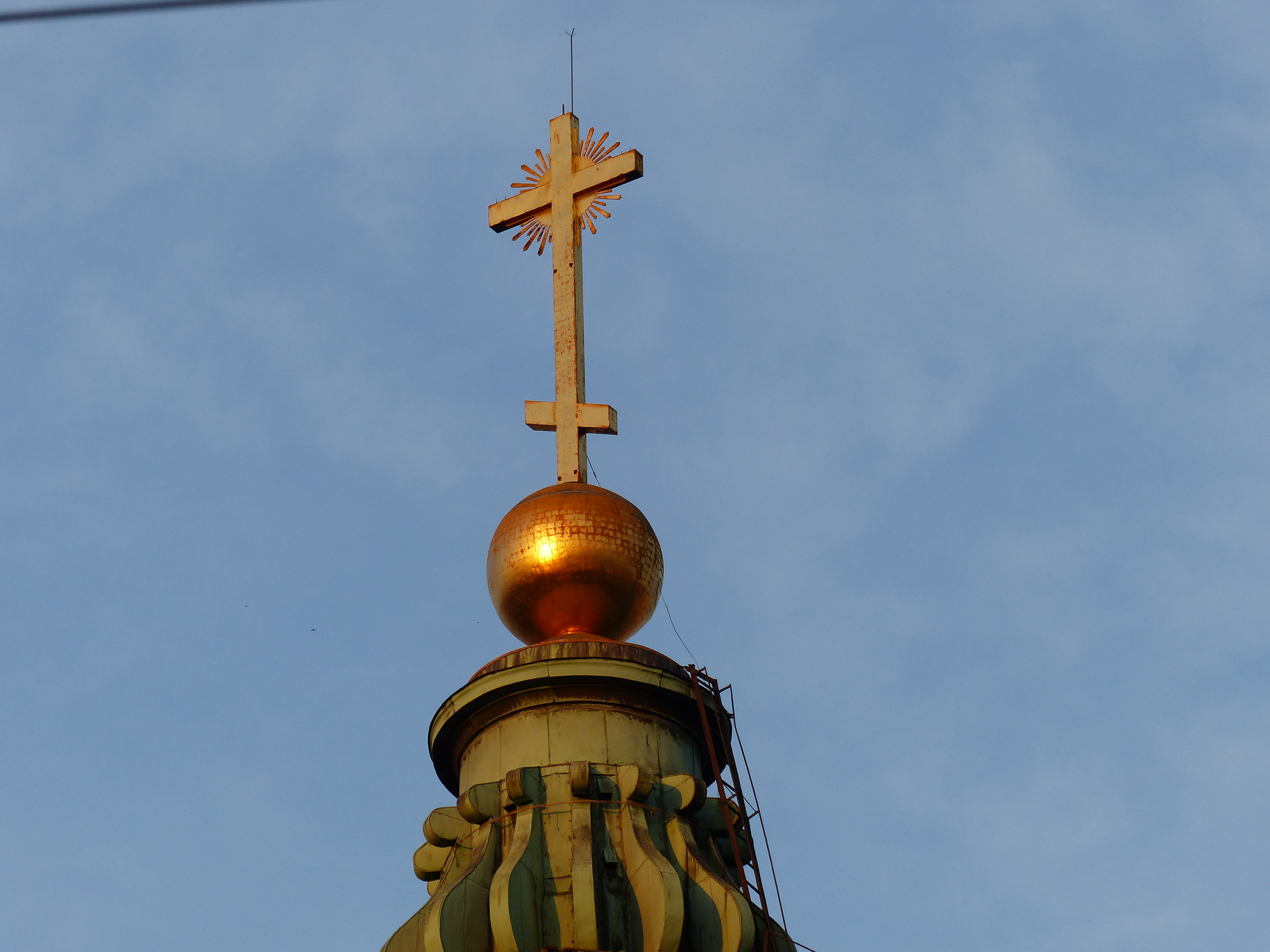
Detail of cross

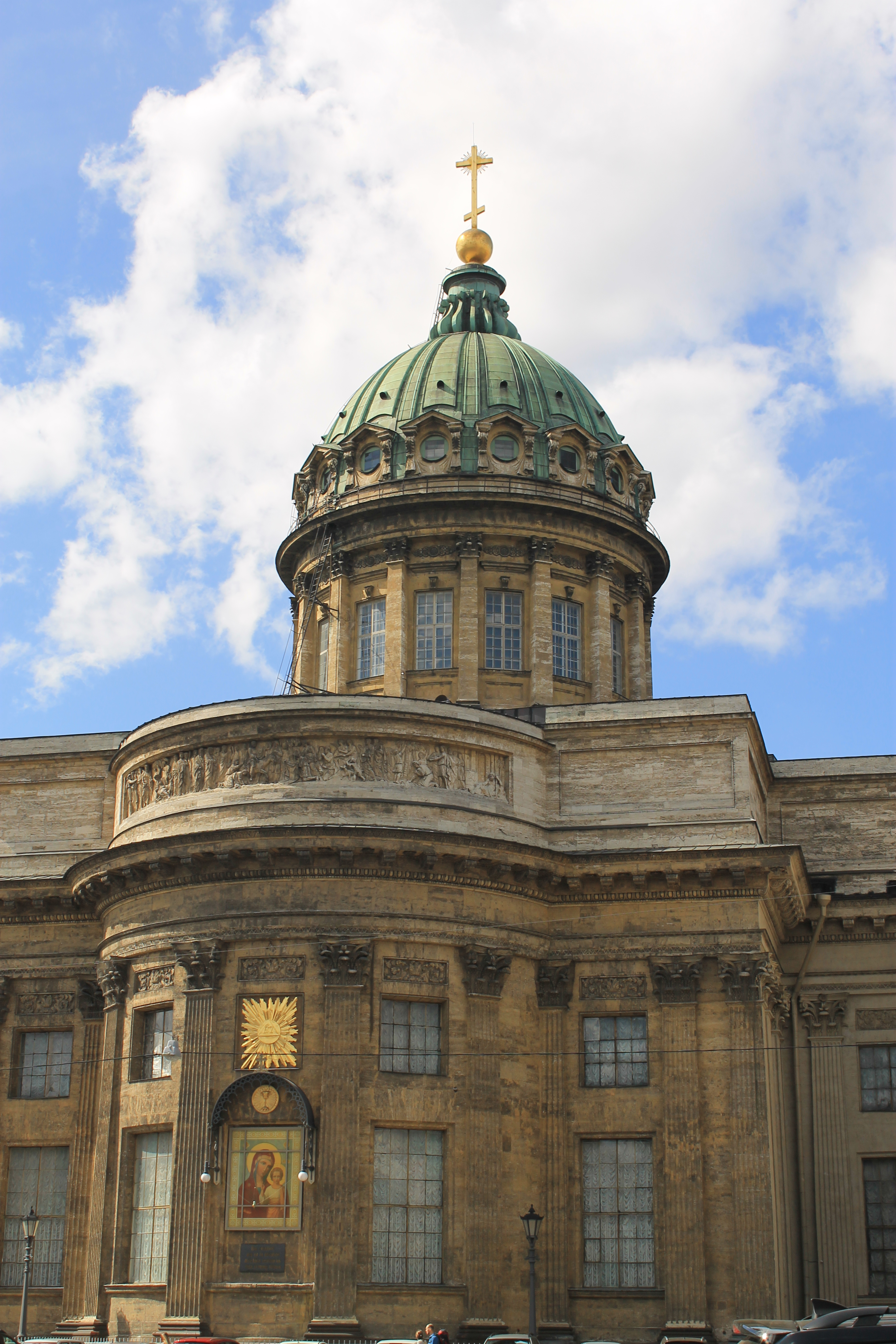
Side view of cathedral

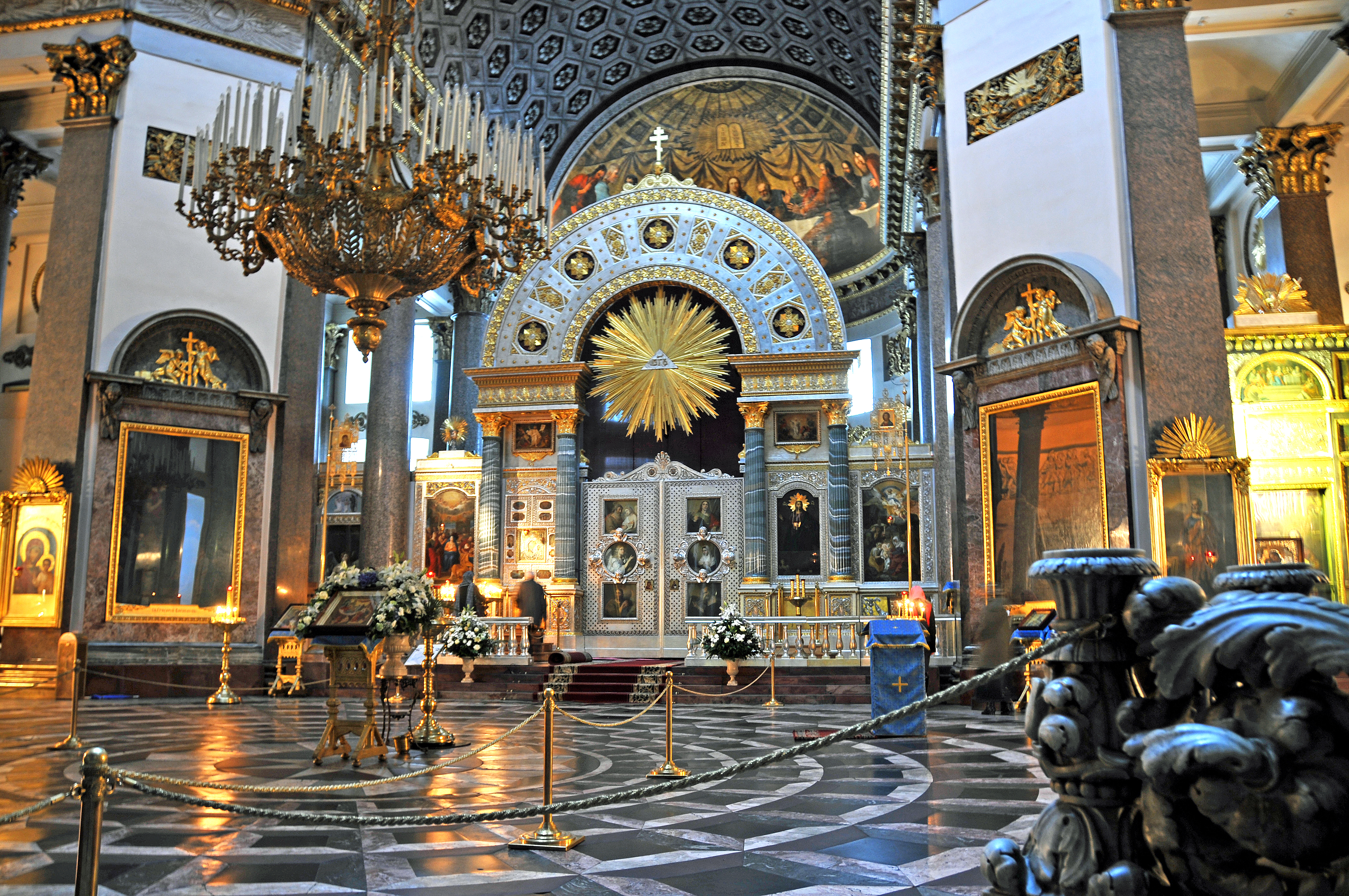
Main view of the iconostasis

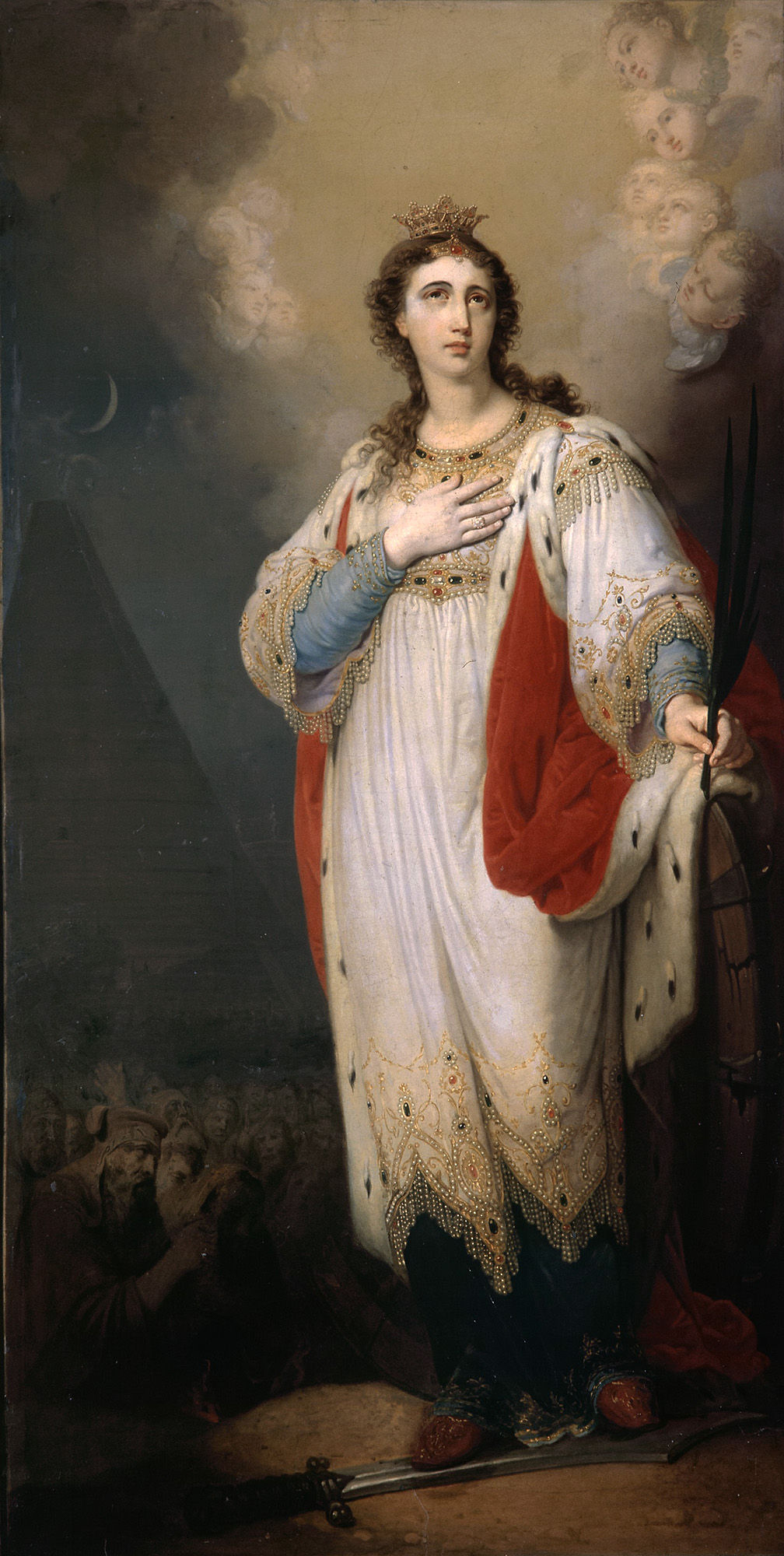
St Catherine of Alexandria by Vladimir Borovikovsky

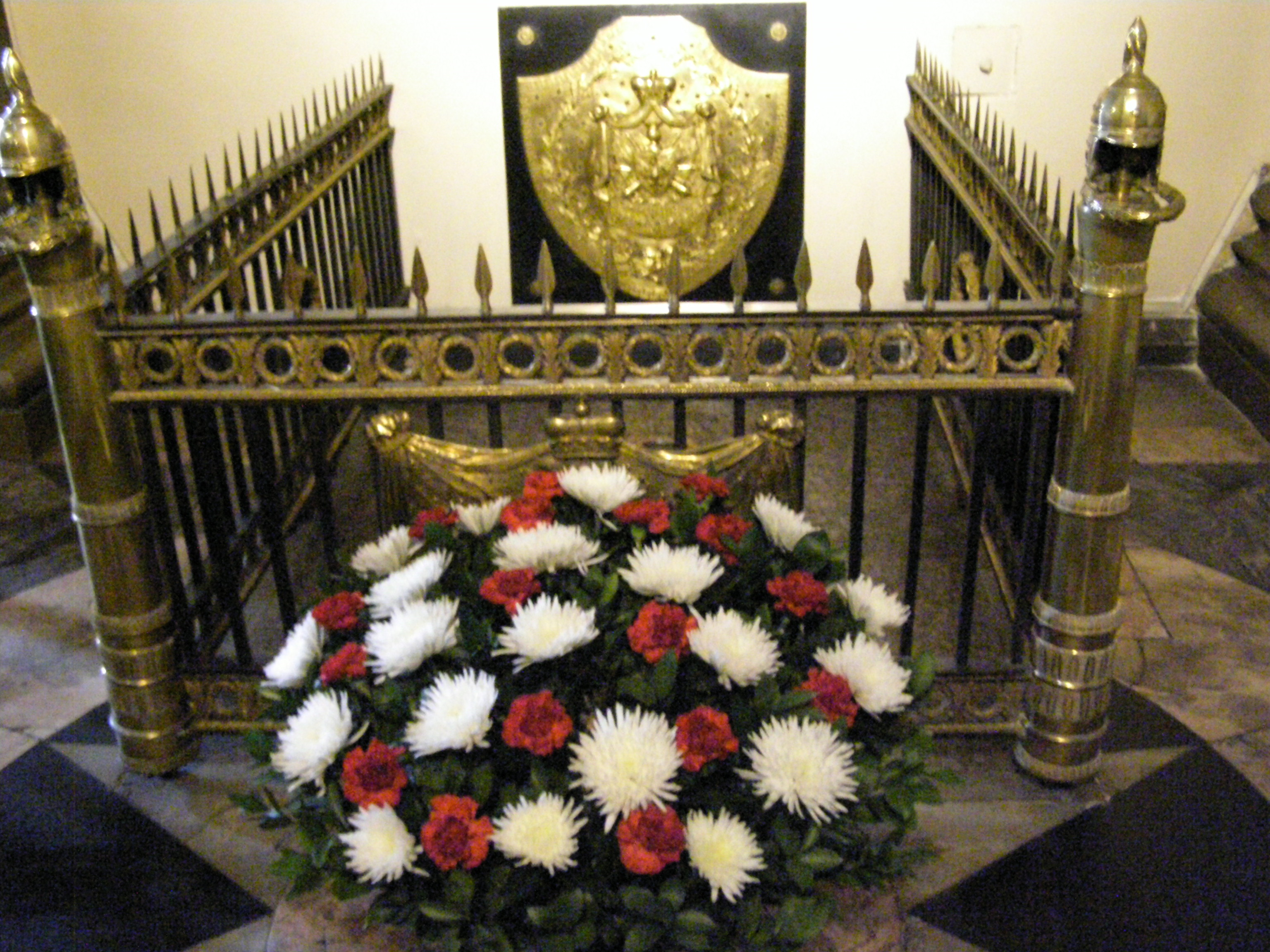
Grave of Mikhail Kutuzov

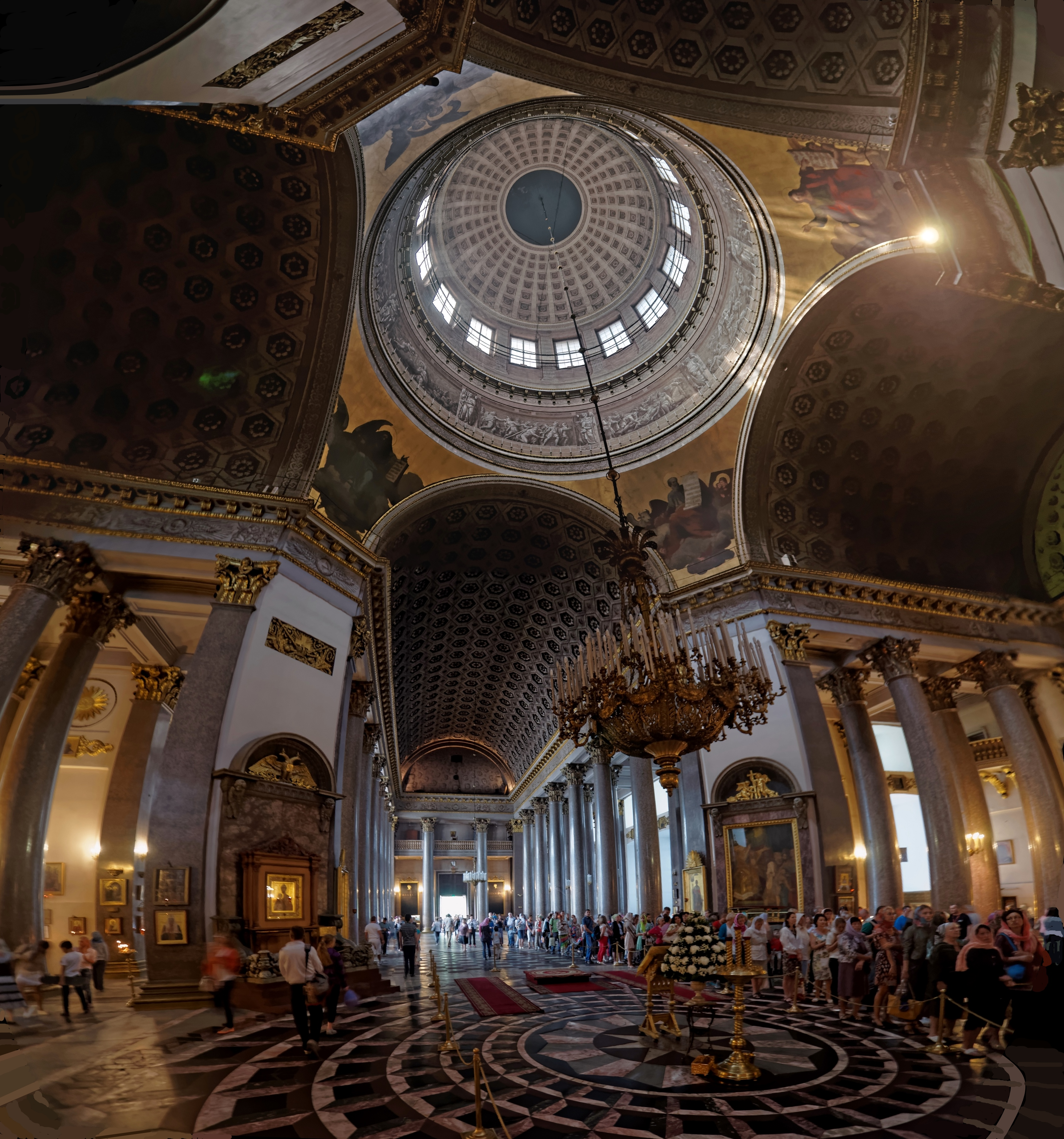
Main dome

== See also ==
- List of tallest domes
- List of largest Eastern Orthodox church buildings
- Our Lady of Kazan
- Kazan Cathedral, Moscow

== Sources ==
- Koeppe, Wolfram; Giusti, Anna Maria, eds. (2008). Art of the royal court: treasures in Pietre Dure from the palaces of Europe. Michigan: Metropolitan Museum of Art. p. 352. ISBN 978-0300136722.
