= Voronezh Congress =

The Voronezh Congress of the Russian Narodnik Land and Liberty group was held in Voronezh in southwestern Russia in June 1879. It started on 18 June and went on for three to four days attended by about twenty people. It was a clandestine meeting taking place amidst the repression following Alexander Soloviev's attempt assassinate Tsar Alexander II in April 1879 – an event which had in fact led to a political crisis in the group. The conference failed to resolve the differences between the two major factions, which split only agreeing to dissolve their former organisation.

== Lipetsk Congress ==
In June 1879 in nearby Lipetsk. a preparatory congress was organised by the "political" faction which was to become the Narodnaya Volya (People's Will). Expecting to be outnumbered and potentially expelled, they want to plan an immediate response following the main congress. They did not inform those from rival factions.
