= Kazan demonstration =

Political demonstration in Russia

The Kazan demonstration of 1876 (Казанская демонстрация 1876 года in Russian) was the first political demonstration in Russia. It took place on December 6, 1876, in front of the Kazan Cathedral in Saint Petersburg. The demonstration was organised and conducted by the members of Zemlya i volya (Land and Liberty) and workers' associations. Some 400 people gathered in the cathedral square. Georgi Plekhanov, who was one of the organisers of the demonstration, gave a passionate speech during the demonstration, indicting the autocracy and defending the ideas of Chernyshevsky, who was then in exile. One of the workers - Ya.Potapov - waved a red flag. The demonstrators offered resistance to the police. As a result, 31 demonstrators were arrested, of which five people would later be sentenced to 10 to 15 years of katorga, other ten to Siberian exile and other three, including Potapov, to a 5-year incarceration in a monastery.
