= Thomas Embling Hospital =

- Victorian Institute of Forensic Mental Health (Forensicare)

Geography
- Location: Yarra Bend Road, Fairfield, Victoria, Australia
- Coordinates: 37°47′21.3″S 145°0′43.0″E

Organisation
- Care system: Medicare
- Type: Forensic Psychiatric
- Affiliated university: Swinburne University, Centre for Forensic Behavioural Science

Services
- Standards: Mental Health Act 2016, Crimes (Mental Impairment and Unfitness to be Tried) Act 1997, Corrections Act 1986 and Sentencing Act 1991
- Emergency department: No
- Beds: 116

Helipads
- Helipad: No

History
- Founded: April 2000

Links
- Website: www.forensicare.vic.gov.au
- Lists: Hospitals in Australia

Thomas Embling Hospital is a high security forensic mental health hospital located in Fairfield, a Melbourne suburb in Victoria, Australia. The facility is operated by the Victorian Institute of Forensic Mental Health (Forensicare), who are responsible for providing adult forensic mental health services in Victoria.

The hospital provides acute and continuing care for patients from the criminal justice system who are in need of psychiatric assessment, treatment or care (security or forensic patients) as well as patients from the Victorian public mental health system who need specialised management (compulsory patients). Purpose-built with 116 secure beds, the hospital opened in April 2000. The hospital is named after mental health reformer Dr Thomas Embling, who was appointed as Yarra Bend Asylum's first Resident Medical Officer.

Patients are usually admitted from the criminal justice system, either via prison transfer or from a court order for psychiatric treatment. Patients have been known to attempt escapes of the facility.

== Site ==
Set on 8.4 hectares, Thomas Embling Hospital is located on the grounds of the former Fairfield Infectious Diseases Hospital and adjacent to the former HM Prison Fairlea and the former Yarra Bend Lunatic Asylum.

== Incidents ==
On 22 February 2006, then Federal Health Minister Tony Abbott was hit in the face by a patient while visiting the hospital. The same patient was later charged with the much-publicised murder of Masa Vukotic in 2015.

In November 2009, a patient fatally stabbed two fellow patients, and in December 2012, a patient was found dead within the hospital.

In March 2013, a patient found not guilty due to mental impairment for attempted murder was allowed to leave the hospital on unescorted leave and did not return on the day. She returned of her own volition four days later. The same patient was again allowed unescorted day leave in February 2015 and failed to return. She was found safe and well and returned by police the following day.

In May 2014, a patient who was found not guilty due to mental impairment for murder and was allowed an unsupervised leave for a day did not return on time. He was found and taken into custody peacefully the next day.

== See also ==
- J Ward
- Kew Asylum
- Beechworth Asylum
- List of Australian psychiatric institutions
