= Aradale Mental Hospital =

Former hospital in Victoria, Australia

Geography
- Location: Ararat, Victoria, Australia
- Coordinates: 37.28°S 142.93°E

Organisation
- Type: Specialist

Services
- Emergency department: Not Applicable
- Beds: 900+
- Speciality: Psychiatric

History
- Founded: 1865
- Closed: 1998

Links
- Website: www.aradale.com.au
- Lists: Hospitals in Australia
- Other links: List of Australian psychiatric institutions

Aradale Mental Hospital was an Australian psychiatric hospital, located in Ararat, a rural city in south-west Victoria, Australia. Originally known as Ararat Lunatic Asylum, Aradale and its two sister asylums at Kew and Beechworth were commissioned to accommodate the growing number of 'lunatics' in the colony of Victoria. Construction began in 1864. The hospital and training centre were decommissioned in April 1994.

== Construction ==
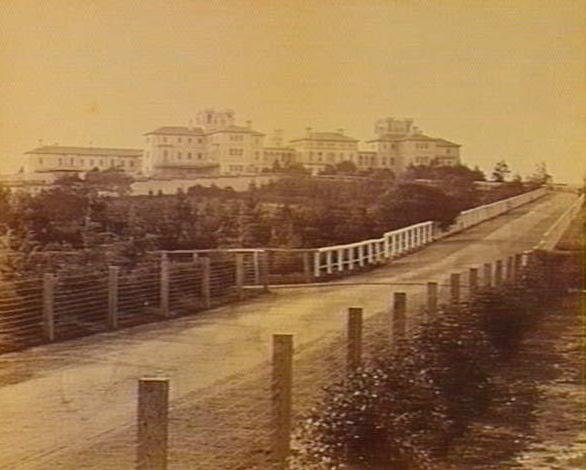
The asylum in 1880.

The asylum was designed by G. W. Vivian and John James Clark (at this time Vivian's assistant), adapting Vivian's initial designs for a similar buildings in Kew and Beechworth. Building commenced at Kew (Kew Lunatic Asylum), Ararat and Beechworth (Beechworth Asylum) at roughly the same time, however Ararat was completed first. The building of Ararat was contracted to O'Grady, Glynn and O'Callaghan and not patients (or "inmates" as they were called) as many erroneously believe. The asylum was built as a town within a town with its own market gardens, orchard, vineyards, piggery and other stock kept on the grounds. At its height it had over 500 staff and as it stands today the complex is made up of 63 buildings ranging in age from the original wings built in the 1860s to the modern forensic unit which was built in 1991 - only two years before the facility closed. Despite being closed as an asylum the facility continued to house female prisoners during the building/renovation of Dame Phyllis Frost Centre right up until its current management took over in 2001.

== Distinctive features ==
The asylum complex is an example of the E-plan barracks type lunatic asylums based on the model 1850s asylum in Colney Hatch, England. Ararat is very similar in design to its sister asylums at Kew and Beechworth, however Ararat's use of linking bridges with an arcade on an arched gateways is unique. Kew is considered to be an example of Second Empire design, whereas Ararat and Beechworth are considered more typically Italianate, though both styles have similar characteristics. The buildings are constructed from oversize bricks, which were then rendered with cement. Two storeyed ward wings extend to each side, one for each sex. The ward wings were surrounded by courtyards lined with iron columned verandas,

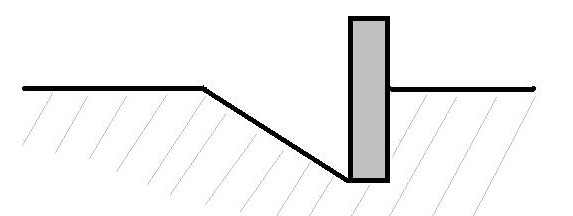

Another distinctive feature of Ararat and other early Victorian asylums is the use of a variation on ha-ha walls around the patients' courtyards. They consisted of a trench, one side of which was vertical and faced with stone or bricks, the other side sloped and turfed. From the inside, the walls presented a tall face to patients, preventing them from escaping, while from outside the walls looked low so as not to suggest imprisonment.

=== Grounds and landscaping ===
In 1913 the landscape gardener Hugh Linaker was employed to layout the grounds of Mont Park. As landscape gardener for the State Lunacy Department, he commenced a program of landscape improvements and tree plantings at asylums in Victoria. Linaker was already familiar with the area, having previously laid out the grounds of Alexandra Park in Ararat. Only a few remnants of the Linaker's plantings remain.

== J Ward ==
In December 1886, the old jail at Ararat was proclaimed as "J Ward" of the Ararat Asylum. It was to cater for those persons who were detained in any jail, reformatory or industrial school or other place of confinement, who appeared to be insane. The ward was not a separate institution in its own right and has continued to function as a division of the Ararat Mental Hospital. "J Ward" was always regarded as a temporary measure.

A new institution was to be built at Sunbury for the retention of the criminally insane. However, when the building was nearing completion it was decided that it would house females only and males would remain at "J Ward". In May 1988, the then Minister for Health announced that "J Ward" was to be closed over the next year.

The decommissioning of Aradale began in the early 1990s, with patients transferred to community living and to other facilities. After December 1993, the Ararat Forensic Psychiatry Centre was the only remaining ward. In 1997, the remaining patients at AFPC were eventually transferred to Rosanna, until the new Thomas Embling Hospital in Fairfield was completed.

== Current Use and the Paranormal ==
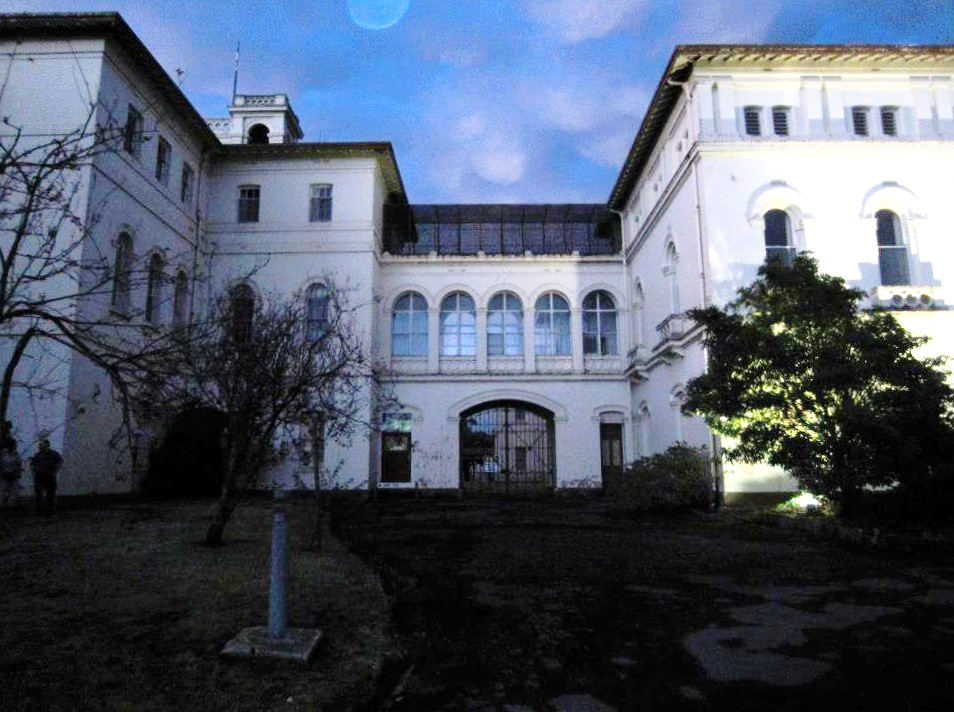
Hospital building in 2017

In 2001, the Victorian Government provided $7.4 million to Melbourne Polytechnic to establish a campus of the Melbourne Polytechnic's Ararat Training Centre on the site of the hospital. 30 hectares of vineyard and 10 hectares of olive grove were planted in 2002, and an olive processing facility and winery were later built on site. The first planting at the Ararat campus was of 28 hectares of vines, which produced the first vintage in 2005. Since commencing training and research at Aradale in 2002, Melbourne Polytechnic also established a 250 tonne winery, a four hectare lavender farm, and extensive training facilities. The Polytechnic campus was established to provide a world-class wine and hospitality training facility in Victoria.

There are regular paranormal investigations at the hospital, and it is considered one of the most haunted locations in Victoria, possibly all of Australia.

== See also ==
- J Ward
- Kew Asylum
- Beechworth Asylum
- List of Australian psychiatric institutions
