= Yarra Bend Asylum =

Former hospital in Victoria, Australia

Coordinates: 37.79082°S 145.010637°E

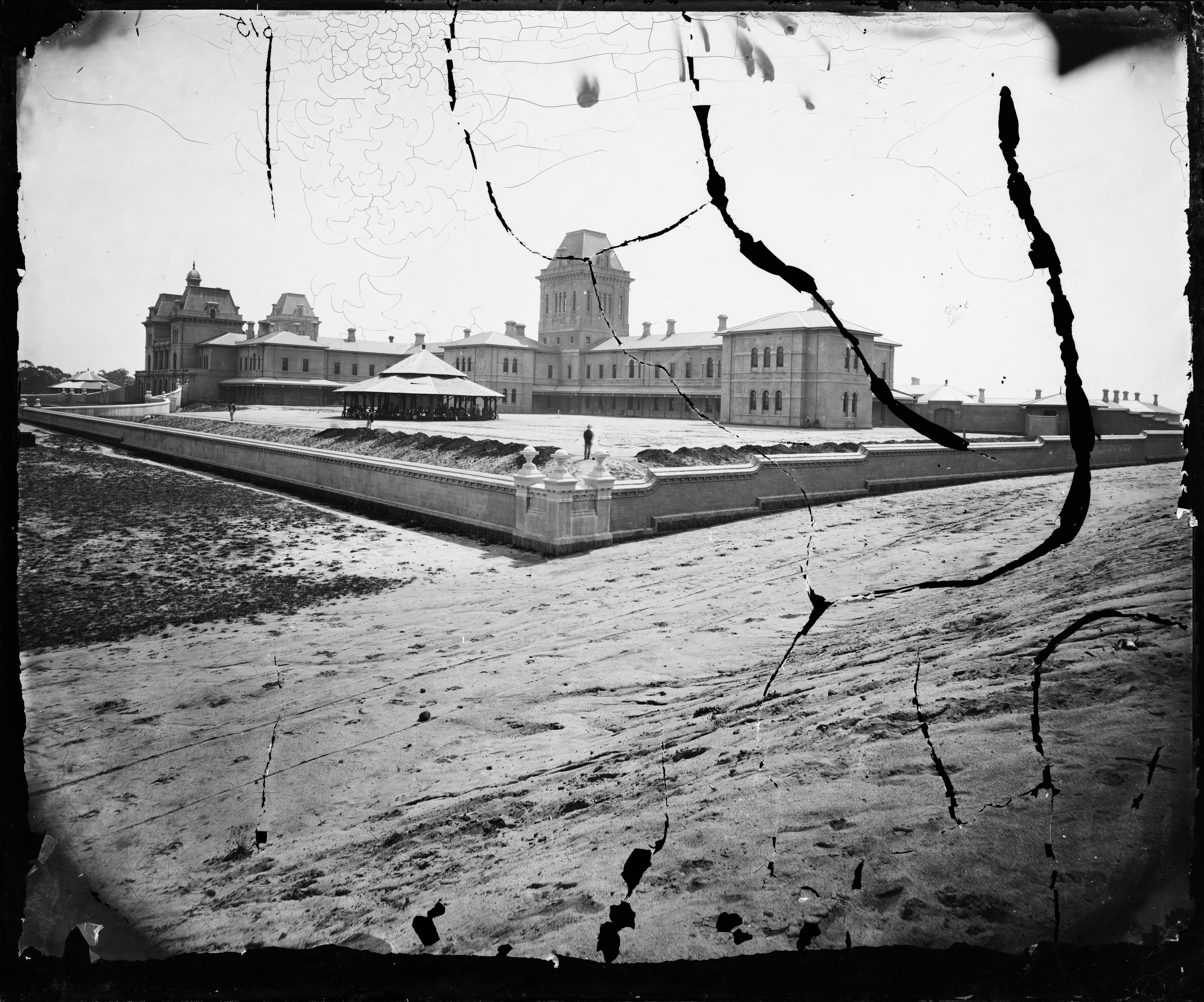
- The Yarra Bend Asylum, Melbourne, 1870-1875

Geography
- Location: Yarra Bend, Fairfield, Victoria, Australia

Organisation
- Type: Specialist

Services
- Emergency department: Not Applicable
- Beds: 1043
- Speciality: Psychiatric

History
- Founded: 1848
- Closed: 1925

Links
- Lists: Hospitals in Australia
- Other links: List of Australian psychiatric institutions

Yarra Bend Asylum was the first permanent institution established in Victoria that was devoted to the treatment of the mentally ill. It opened in 1848 as a ward of the Asylum at Tarban Creek in New South Wales. It was not officially called Yarra Bend Asylum until July 1851 when the Port Phillip District separated from the Colony of New South Wales. Prior to the establishment of Yarra Bend, lunatic patients had been kept in the District's gaols. Yarra Bend was proclaimed an Asylum under the provisions of the Lunacy Statute 1867 (No.309) in the Government Gazette in October 1867.

From its establishment until 1905 the institution at Yarra Bend was known as an asylum. This title emphasised its function as a place of refuge rather than a hospital which provided treatment for mentally ill people who could possibly be cured. The Lunacy Act 1903 (No.1873) changed the title of all "asylums" to "hospitals for the insane". This Act came into operation in 1905. Despite the change in designation the function and structure of the agency was unchanged. The title was altered to reflect the community's changing attitude towards mental illness and the Victorian Government's approach to the treatment of mentally disturbed persons.

An asylum/hospital for the insane was any public building proclaimed by the Governor-in-Council in the Government Gazette as a place for the reception of lunatics. An asylum could also provide wards for the temporary reception of patients as well as long term patients. Patients could not be retained in an asylum without a warrant requesting their admission. Prior to 1867 the warrant was signed by the Governor. After this date the Chief Secretary (VRG 26) was responsible for this function. Under the provisions of the Lunacy Act 1914 (No.2539) patients could also be admitted to a hospital for the insane on a voluntary basis, that is, on the patient's own request for a specified period of time.

The Yarra Bend Asylum was situated near the junction of Merri Creek and the Yarra River near the former site of Fairlea Women's Prison.

== Decline and closure ==
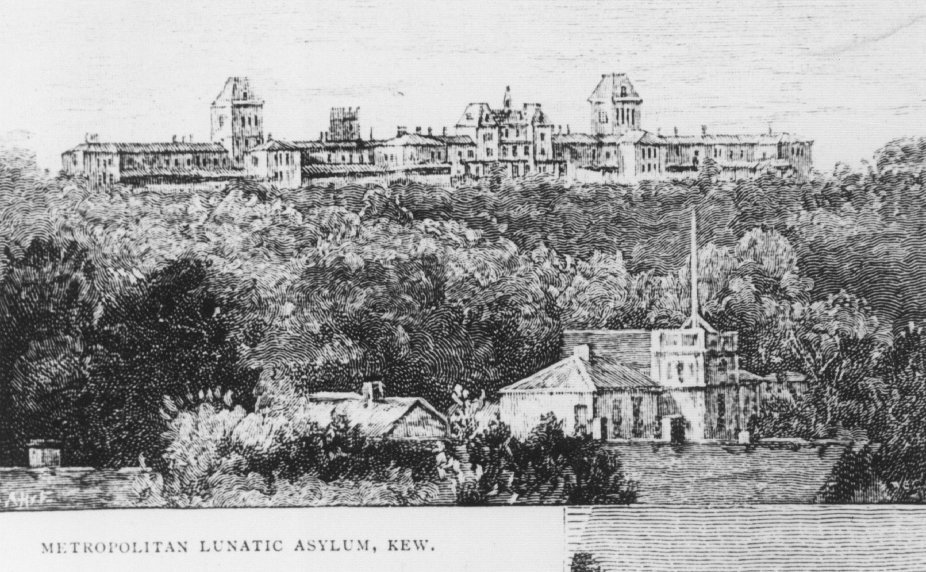
Engraving of Kew Asylum circa 1880. Buildings of Yarra Bend Asylum are depicted in the foreground

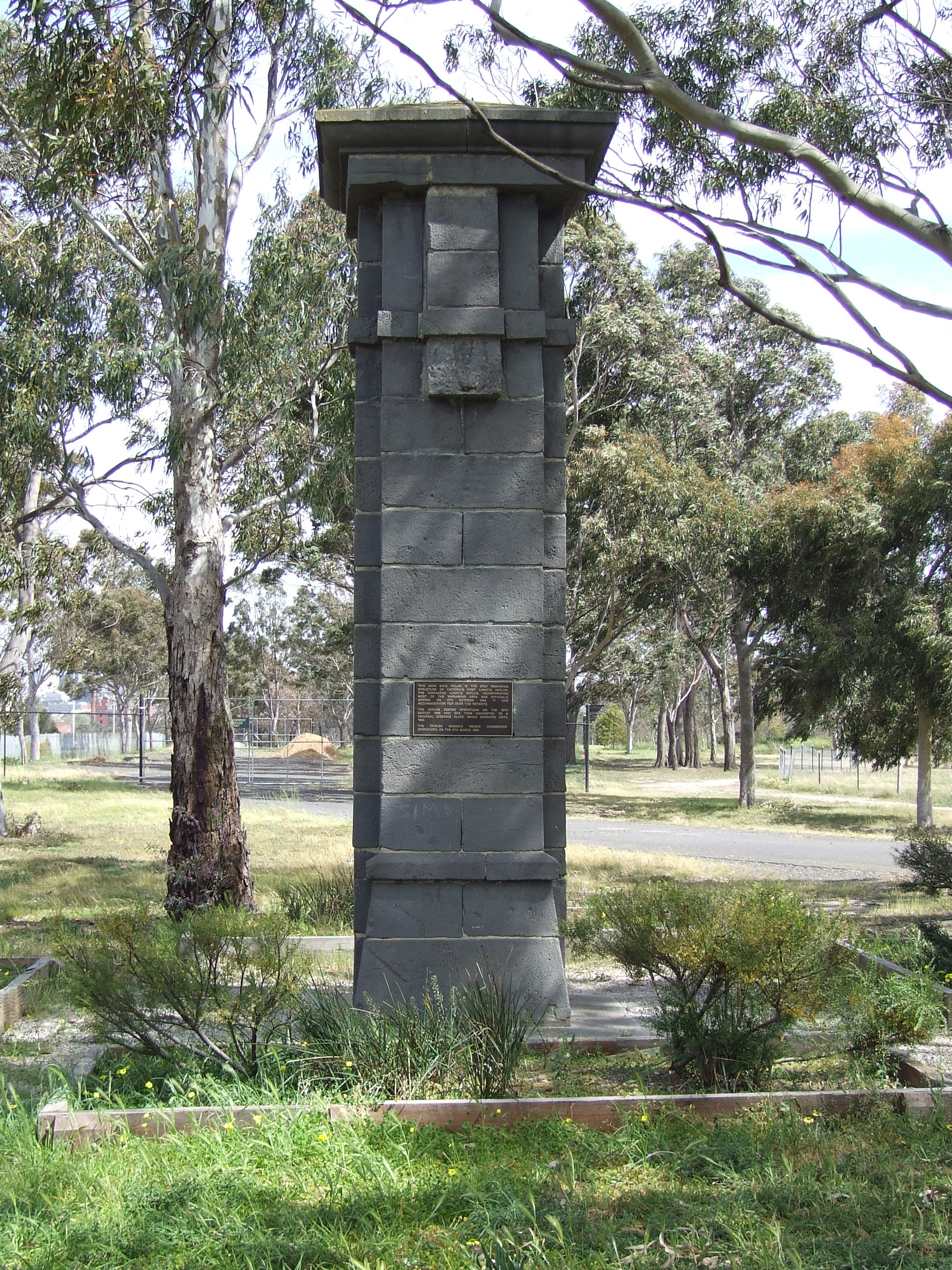
A pillar from the gates of Yarra Bend Asylum. It is the last remaining structure of the asylum and is situated on the west side of Yarra Bend Road, just north of the Eastern Freeway cutting.

The Government of Victoria originally intended that Yarra Bend would be closed once Kew, Ararat and Beechworth asylums were established. However, the gold rush caused a population explosion in the colony, increasing the burden on the new asylums. This was compounded by the practice of housing 'inebriates', 'idiots' and 'imbeciles' at lunatic asylums up until the 1880s.

Overcrowding, and the primitive living conditions, were problems at Yarra Bend over a long period. The overcrowding was relieved to some extent when new asylums were opened at Royal Park, and Mont Park in the metropolitan area, and Sunbury outside the metropolitan district. Victorian Premier Sir Thomas Bent decided in 1905 that no more money was to be spent on Yarra Bend, and the buildings fell further into disrepair. Despite that, the asylum continued to operate until new admissions eventually ceased in 1924, and the institution was finally closed in 1925. All remaining patients were transferred to Mont Park Asylum.

=== Demolition and later use ===
In 1926 many of the wooden buildings were demolished, leaving the ha-ha wall, gateway and infirmary building. The closure of the asylum saw much of the land released for public use. The infirmary building became part of the Fairhaven Venereal Disease Clinic. After Fairhaven's closure, the gates, walls and infirmary were incorporated into Fairlea Women's Prison which was built on the site. The prison was severely damaged by fire in 1982, and the asylum structures were demolished as a result. The only visible remaining structure is one of the 1860 gate pillars which was relocated to the opposite side of Yarra Bend Road, though some of the bluestone and brick foundation walls of the asylum still exist below ground level.

=== Cemetery ===
Inmates who died at Yarra Bend Asylum were usually interred in unmarked, common graves within the asylum grounds. Families who wished their relative to be buried in a single grave were required to pay an extra fee. The exact number of interments that took place, and their location, is unknown, but it has been suggested as many as 1,200 former inmates were buried in up to 400 graves. According to Parks Victoria, the cemetery was located along the banks of the Yarra, along what is today a practice fairway of the Yarra Bend public golf course. The cemetery and other features of the asylum are marked on contemporary plans prepared by the Melbourne and Metropolitan Board of Works, e.g. MMBW Plan 39, 160 feet to the inch

also see:

Yarra Bend Lunatic Asylum : IMAGES and information (Darebin Libraries)

Yarra Bend Asylum and the Lost Cemetery (Museum of Lost Things)

== See also ==
- List of Australian psychiatric institutions
- Kew Lunatic Asylum
- Kew Cottages
- HM Prison Fairlea
