= List of psychiatric hospitals in Australia =

This is a list of operational and former Australian psychiatric hospitals.

== Australian Capital Territory ==
There are no institutions known to have existed.

== New South Wales ==
Mental asylums in New South Wales
Facility	Status	Managed	Opened	Closed	Capacity	Location
Castle Hill Lunatic Asylum	Demolished	?	1811	1826	?	Castle Hill
Callan Park Hospital for the Insane	Closed	Warden: G Cleaver	1885	2008	250	Lilyfield
Cumberland Hospital	Operational	?	1849		250	Parramatta
Darlinghurst Gaol	Closed	?	1841	1914	?	Darlinghurst
Gladesville Mental Hospital (Tarban Creek Lunatic Asylum)	Closed	?	1838	1993	?	Gladesville
Kenmore Asylum	Closed	?	1895	2003	700	Goulburn
Morisset Hospital	Operational	?	?		?	Morisset
Macquarie Hospital	Operational	?	1959		195	North Ryde
Peat Island Hospital	Closed	?	1911	2010	?	Peat Island
Darlinghurst Lunatic Reception House	Closed	?	1868	1961	?	Darlinghurst
Port Macquarie Mental Asylum	Closed	?	?	?	?	Port Macquarie
Rydalmere Psychiatric Hospital	Closed	?	1814	2016	?	Rydalmere
Bloomfield Mental Hospital	Closed	?	1925	?	?	Orange
Orange Mental Health Service	Operational		2011		?	Orange
Stockton Mental Hospital	Closed	?	1917	1989	?	Stockton

== Northern Territory ==
There are no asylums known to have existed.

== Queensland ==
Mental asylums in Queensland
Facility	Status	Opened	Closed	Capacity	Location
The Park Centre for Mental Health	Operational	1865		192	Wolston Park
Baillie Henderson Hospital	Operational	1890		>400	Toowoomba
Ipswich Mental Hospital	Scheduled for Closure	1878	2024	>600	Ipswich
Mosman Hall	Converted to Luxury Housing	1952	2001	?	Charters Towers
Total capacity					?

== South Australia ==
- Glenside Hospital
- James Nash House

== Tasmania ==
- Cascades Female Factory
- Royal Derwent Hospital (Willow Court) – This hospital was the oldest operating hospital for the mentally ill in Australia, operating from 1830–2000
- Royal Hobart Hospital Unit K
- Northside Clinic
- Millbrook Rise
- Spencer Clinic

== Victoria ==
Mental asylums in Victoria
Facility	Status	Opened	Closed	Capacity	Location
The Melbourne Clinic	Open	1978	?	203	Richmond, Melbourne
Yarra Bend Asylum	Demolished	1848	1925	1000+	Fairfield, Melbourne
Ararat Asylum (Aradale Mental Hospital)	Closed	1865	1993	2000	Ararat
Collingwood Stockade (Carlton Lunatic Asylum)	Demolished	1866	1872	?	Carlton North, Melbourne
Beechworth Asylum (Mayday Hills)	Closed	1867	1995	1200	Beechworth
Kew Asylum (Willsmere Mental Hospital)	Closed	1871	1988	884 (in 1903)	Kew, Melbourne
Ballarat Asylum (Lakeside Mental Hospital)	Demolished	1877	1997	?	Ballarat
Sunbury Asylum (Caloola)	Closed	1879	1985	?	Sunbury
Kew Cottages	Closed	1887	2007	?	Kew, Melbourne
Royal Park	Closed	1909	1999	?	Parkville, Melbourne
Mont Park Asylum	Closed	1912	1999	?	Bundoora, Melbourne
Hobson's Park (Traralgon Psychiatric Hospital)	Demolished	1963	1995	193	Traralgon
Larundel Psychiatric Hospital	New housing built on site	1953	2001	747	Bundoora, Melbourne
Brierly Mental Hospital	Demolished	1957	1996	200+	Warrnambool
Thomas Embling Hospital	Operational	2000	–	116	Fairfield, Melbourne
Plenty Hospital	Closed				Bundoora
Gresswell Hospital	Closed				

Pleasant View Receiving House in Preston (short lived). Heatherton Hospital in south east Melbourne.

== Western Australia ==
Mental asylums in Western Australia
Facility	Status	Managed	Opened	Closed	Capacity	Location
Claremont Mental Hospital	Closed	?	1903	1972	1,114	Mount Claremont
Fremantle Lunatic Asylum	Closed	?	1865	1909	?	Fremantle
Graylands Hospital	Operational		1909	–	178	Mount Claremont
Heathcote Mental Hospital	Closed	?	1929	1994	113	Applecross
Perth House	Closed	?	1909	1911	?	Perth
Roma Hospital	Closed	?	1924	1925	?	Cottesloe
Whitby Falls Mental Hospital	Closed	?	1897	1972	34	Mundijong

== See also ==
- List of Australian prisons
- List of hospitals in Australia
