= Lakeside Hospital =

Lakeside Hospital may refer to:

- Lakeside Hospital (Cleveland), a defunct hospital, now part of the University Hospitals Cleveland Medical Center in Cleveland, Ohio, United States
- Lakeside Hospital (Florida), a hospital on the National Register of Historic Places listings in Walton County, Florida
- Lakeside Mental Hospital, a defunct psychiatric hospital in Wendouree, Victoria, Australia
- Tulane–Lakeside Hospital, a woman's health hospital in Metairie, Louisiana, United States
