= Samuel Amess =

Australian politician

25th Mayor of Melbourne
- In office 1869–1870
- Preceded by: Thomas Moubray
- Succeeded by: Thomas McPherson

Personal details
- Born: 1826 Newburgh, Fife
- Died: 2 July 1898 (aged 71–72) Melbourne, Victoria

Samuel Amess (1826 – 2 July 1898) was Mayor of Melbourne from 1869–1870, after having joined the council in 1864. Born in Newburgh, Fife in Scotland, Amess immigrated to Victoria in 1852, and after success on the goldfields established himself as a building contractor. Among several prominent projects, Amess' firm was involved in the building of the Kew Asylum, Old Treasury Building and Customs House, and he personally funded the celebrations of the opening of the Melbourne Town Hall. After his term as mayor ended in 1870, Amess remained heavily involved in public life until his death in 1898.

Preceded by Thomas Moubray	Mayor of Melbourne; 1869–1870	Succeeded by Thomas McPherson
