= Royal Park Hospital =

Coordinates: 37.777405°S 144.940117°E

Royal Park Psychiatric Hospital

Geography
- Location: Royal Park, Parkville, Victoria, Australia

Organisation
- Care system: Public
- Type: Psychiatric

Services
- Emergency department: Not applicable
- Beds: ??

History
- Founded: 1907
- Closed: 1999

Links
- Lists: Hospitals in Australia
- Other links: List of Australian psychiatric institutions

Royal Park Psychiatric Hospital, commonly known as Royal Park is a former Receiving House and Psychiatric Hospital located in Parkville. Operating for over 90 years, Royal Park Hospital was the first psychiatric hospital established in Victoria after the Lunacy Act 1903, and was intended for patients with curable disorders. Built on the north-western edge of the 181 hectare parklands known as Royal Park, Royal Park Hospital along with Royal Melbourne Hospital, Royal Children's Hospital and Mount Royal formed the Parkville Hospital Precinct. Following the hospital's closure in the 1990s, several of the hospital's original buildings have been listed on the Victorian Heritage Register for their historic and architectural values.

== Construction and design ==
The hospital buildings were designed by architect SE Bindley of the Public Works Department in a Queen Anne style. Constructed between 1906 and 1913, the buildings were mostly made of red brick and were surrounded by verandahs. Separate buildings were made for males and females, and for acute and convalescent patients.

== History ==
Royal Park opened as a Receiving House in September 1907. Receiving Houses were used to provide accommodation for those patients who required only short term diagnosis and treatment. No person was to be detained in a receiving house for more than two months in any event. Patients diagnosed as insane were transferred to a Hospital for the Insane such as Kew Asylum or Yarra Bend Asylum by order of the Superintendent of the Receiving House. Following the completion of some of the hospital wards, Royal Park was gazetted as a Receiving House and a Hospital for the Insane on 7 April 1909.

Since its establishment the title of Royal Park Hospital has been altered to reflect both the community's changing attitude towards mental illness and the Victorian Government's approach to the treatment of mentally ill persons. The Mental Hygiene Act 1933 (No.4157, proclaimed 14/2/1934) altered the title from "Royal Park Hospital for the Insane" to "Royal Park Mental Hospital". Up until 1954 Royal Park functioned as a mental hospital for long term patients and a receiving house for short term patients. In April 1954 Royal Park's function as a Mental Hospital was revoked, published in the Government Gazette on 7 April 1954. From 1954 Royal Park functioned as a hospital providing short term diagnosis and accommodation only. The Mental Health Act 1959 (No.6605, operational since 1962) changed the title of "Receiving House" to "Psychiatric Hospital".

A special Military Mental Hospital was opened at Royal Park in 1915. The date range of this hospital is unknown.

Several notable individuals have worked at Royal Park Hospital. John Cade, discoverer of lithium's effect on mania, was superintendent of the hospital and dean of the clinical school from 1952-1977. Cade was recognized as an Officer of the Order of Australia in 1976 for his contributions to medicine. Shirley Andrews was hired by John Cade to run the clinical laboratory of Royal Park Hospital in 1953. She worked there until her retirement in 1977. Andrews was recognized with the Medal of the Order of Australia in 1994 for her work on Australian folk dancing.

== Closure and redevelopment ==
As a consequence of the Victorian Government's policy of deinstitutionalisation, Royal Park Hospital was decommissioned in the 1990s. The old Receiving House has been home to the Early Psychosis Prevention and Intervention Centre (EPPIC) since the mid-1990s. Renamed Orygen Youth Health incorporating the EPPIC program. Orygen Youth Health is part of NorthWestern Mental Health which is itself part of Melbourne Health. After the closure of the Royal Park Psychiatric Hospital, inpatient psychiatric services were transferred to the new John Cade Building at RMH City Campus, under the umbrella of NorthWestern Mental Health.

A number of the original hospital buildings were listed on the Victorian Heritage Register (H2606) and were restored and redeveloped as part of the Commonwealth Games Village for the 2006 Melbourne Commonwealth Games.

== See also ==
- List of Australian psychiatric institutions
- John Cade
- Kew Lunatic Asylum
- Kew Cottages
