= Sunbury Asylum =

Coordinates: 37.596313°S 144.72925°E

Sunbury Lunatic Asylum
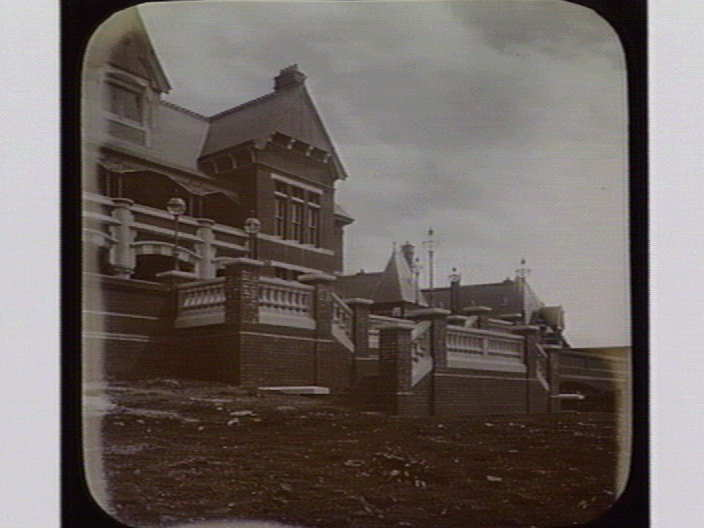
- Entrance steps

Geography
- Location: Sunbury, Victoria, Australia

Organisation
- Care system: Public
- Type: Psychiatric

History
- Founded: 1879
- Closed: 1985

Links
- Lists: Hospitals in Australia

Sunbury Lunatic Asylum was a 19th-century mental health facility known as a lunatic asylum, located in Sunbury, Victoria, Australia, first opened in October 1879.

Prior to being opened as an asylum, Sunbury was controlled by the Department of Industrial and Reformatory Schools (VA 1466). When Sunbury was acquired by the Hospitals for the Insane Branch (VA 2863) patients were transferred from the Ballarat Asylum (VA 2844) and the Ballarat Asylum was handed over to the Department of Industrial and Reformatory Schools. Patients were also transferred from Yarra Bend Asylum (VA 2839). Its proclamation as an asylum was published in the Government Gazette on 31 October 1879.

Since its establishment, the title of the institution at Sunbury has been altered several times to reflect both the community's changing attitude towards mental illness and the Australian government's approach to the treatment of mentally disturbed persons. From its establishment until 1905 the institution was known as an Asylum. This title emphasised its function as a place of detention rather than a hospital which provided treatment for mentally ill people who could be cured. The Lunacy Act 1903 (No. 1873) of changed the title of all "asylums" to "hospitals for the insane". This Act came into force in March 1905. The Mental Hygiene Act 1933 (No. 4157) again altered the title, now to "mental hospitals".

An asylum or hospital for the insane was any public building proclaimed by the Governor-in-Council and published in the Government Gazette as a place for the reception of mentally ill persons. An asylum could also provide wards for the temporary reception of patients as well as long term patients. Up until the Mental Health Act 1959 became operative in 1962 these "short-term" wards were known as "receiving houses" or "receiving wards". The Mental Health Act 1959 (No.6605) designated hospitals providing short-term diagnosis and accommodation as "psychiatric hospitals". However throughout its life Sunbury has been used almost exclusively for long-term patients.

Patients could not be retained in an Asylum without a warrant requesting their admission. Prior to 1867 the warrant was signed by the Governor. After this date the Chief Secretary (VRG 26) was responsible for this function. From 1934 the Director of Mental Hygiene (VA 2866) and from 1952 the Chief Medical Officer of the Mental Hygiene Branch (VA 2866) were successively responsible for admission of patients. The Lunacy Act 1914 (No.2539) made provision for the admission of patients on a voluntary basis, i.e. on a patient's own request for a specified period of time.

In 1962 under the provisions of the Mental Health Act 1959 (No.6605) Sunbury was proclaimed in the Government Gazette as a Mental Hospital and a Training Centre as it was responsible for mentally disturbed and intellectually disabled patients. In 1985 responsibility for Sunbury was passed from the Mental Health Division (VA 6961) of the Department of Health II (VA 2695) to the Office of Intellectual Disability Services (VA 2909), a division of the Department of Community Services (VA 2633). It was used for a period thereafter as a training centre to accommodate intellectually handicapped persons.

Victoria University accepted the Urban Land Authorities' offer in 1992 to take over the Caloola site and operated it as a university campus for several years; it closed the campus in 2011 but is still home to a primary and specialist school, 3NRG radio, and the Boilerhouse Theatre Company.

In 2013, a group known as the Sunbury Asylum Alliance was established with the aim to reclaim the site for a community, training and tourism hub.

In September 2026, it was announced the Sunbury Asylum would be renovated to become houses in the 2027 season of Australian reality series, The Block.

== Ghost Tours ==
In November 2015 it was announced that Sunbury Asylum would re-open its doors to the public for the first time in over 2 years with night time Ghost Tours. Ghost Tours of the Asylum started back up on November the 14th 2015 being led by Sunbury woman, Julie Mills. Since re-opening the tours have seen a flood of interest, with tours still booked out several weeks in advance.

In an arrangement with the current owners of the site (Victoria University), Ms Mills has access to seven buildings that form the asylum, including the old admission building, men’s ward for the criminally insane, not to mention the morgue.

In December 2019, a phone call made to book a tour confirmed that Victoria University are no longer allowing access to and have taken control of the buildings. A fence has been erected around the site and a number of high tech cameras were placed around the site linked to a control centre so if anyone tried to enter security were alerted.

As of 22 August 2026, tours are still running.

== See also ==
- Kew Cottages
- Kew Lunatic Asylum
- Lakeside Mental Hospital
- List of Australian psychiatric institutions
- Sunbury Industrial School
- Yarra Bend Asylum
