= HM Prison Fairlea =

Australian female prison in Victoria, Australia

Coordinates: 37.79082°S 145.010637°E

- Interactive map of HM Prison Fairlea
- Location: Fairfield, Victoria
- Status: Closed, demolished
- Security class: Minimum & Maximum security
- Capacity: 60 (1956–1982); 106 (1986–1996)
- Opened: 9 March 1956
- Closed: 1996
- Managed by: Department of Corrections

HM Prison Fairlea was an Australian female prison located on Yarra Bend Road in the suburb of Fairfield, Victoria, Australia. The first all-female prison in Victoria, it was built on the site of the Yarra Bend Asylum, with remnants of the walls and gates being used in the layout of the prison. In 1982 a deliberately lit fire led to the deaths of three inmates. The rebuilt and expanded prison reopened in 1986. After closing in 1996 due to privatisation of sections of the prison system, Fairlea was demolished and the site converted to parkland.

== Site ==
In the 1950s, the Victorian Government committed to building the state's first all-female prison. The site chosen on National Park Road (now Yarra Bend Road), Fairfield included the grounds and structures of the former Yarra Bend Lunatic Asylum and Fairhaven Venereal Disease Clinic, many of which were converted for prison use. Prior to the opening of Fairlea, female prisoners had been held in a small section Pentridge Prison. Fairlea's grounds and buildings were more spacious than those of the female unit at Pentridge; however many of the buildings were unsatisfactory, dating from the site's time as an asylum in the 1860s.

== Notable inmates ==
- The Fairlea Five Vietnam War protesters: Jean McLean, Joan Coxsedge, Irene Miller, Jo Maclaine-Cross and Chris Cathie
- Heather Parker – Office of Corrections worker who aided the escape of prisoners Peter Gibb and Archie Butterly in 1993.

== Incidents ==
=== Riot ===
In January 1980 prisoners staged a riot in the mess hall where furniture and crockery were smashed and fittings ripped from kitchen walls. During the incident four prisoners took advantage of the diversion and climbed through smashed windows onto the roof. At 2.00 am prisoners set alight toilet paper in two bathrooms at either end of two adjoining dormitories. Prisoners from two dormitories were locked in the mess hall during the blaze. Firemen, prison officers and a few inmates soon controlled the fire.

=== Dormitory fire ===
A dormitory fire claimed the lives of three remand prisoners on the evening of Saturday 6 February 1982. Two of the women killed, Clelia Teresa Vigano and Mary Escola Catilo, were the respective partners and criminal associates of drug smuggler David McMillan and his associate Michael Sullivan. Two other remand prisoners were injured. A senior police officer said that the fire had been set at 8.15 pm and was "a reaction" to an escape earlier that day. That escape had occurred at 3.00 pm when four women forced a laundry door and scaled two fences; two women were quickly caught by prison officers near the prison grounds while two prisoners evaded capture.

At the subsequent coronial inquiry, two surviving prisoners reported that the third deceased prisoner, Danielle Wright, was angry that two of her friends had been promptly recaptured and placed in solitary confinement after their escape that afternoon. Wright wanted to tear up the building in protest, the witnesses stated, but Vigano suggested she should instead light a fire, reasoning that the buildings were very old and worthy of being condemned anyway. It was planned they would cause some damage with the fire, but then extinguish it. Torn up papers, bedding and mattresses were set fire at about 8.00 pm, and Wright threatened violence against any prisoner who pressed the buzzer to summon an officer. However the fire quickly got out of control and Wright sounded the buzzer. Ten minutes had elapsed before help arrived.

Coroner Kevin Mason criticised the lack of fire training carried out by the prison. He ruled that the three deceased all died of asphyxiation from carbon monoxide poisoning, and that Wright had lit the fire. The hearing heard that two prisoners were rescued by officer Roy Ansfield who crawled into the burning building to retrieve them. At the hearing it was suggested by the counsel for Vigano's parents that the building's wooden construction was unsuitable for its purpose as a locked dormitory; he called it "a potential fire hazard and a death trap".

As a result of the fire, many of the inmates were temporarily housed at Pentridge Prison whilst Fairlea was rebuilt. The new complex was opened in 1986 and 3.7 million dollars was spent on the rebuilding, which allowed the prison to hold up to 106 women at a time. The old asylum and clinic structures were demolished and one of the 1860 gate pillars was relocated to a site opposite the original entry to Fairlea.

=== Cell fire ===
A deliberately lit cell fire caused $3,200 damage on 8 May 1988. An officer ordered three women prisoners from their cell after seeing smoke coming from under its door. They refused and he entered to find them kneeling by a broken window trying to get fresh air. By the time the chief prison officer arrived at 8.15 pm the fire was out. No one was killed or injured in the fire.

== Closure ==
Within ten years of the rebuilding, a change of Government led to the demise of Fairlea. The new Liberal Government began the privatisation of the prison system and as a result private contractors won the right to administer the women's prison system. A new privately run prison, the Metropolitan Women's Correctional Centre was built at Deer Park and during the course of 1996 the inmates of Fairlea Prison were transferred across to the new facility. The Metropolitan Women's Correctional Centre was returned to government control in 2000.

Fairlea Women's Prison finally closed in August 1996, with the majority of structures demolished shortly thereafter. The basketball courts, Parks Victoria Office, and the adjacent building are the only structural remains of Fairlea, with the remaining grounds returned to parkland. Fairlea Road and the Fairlea East and Fairlea West ovals identify the former prison site. During its forty years of operation nearly 18,000 female inmates served time at Fairlea Women's Prison. Fairlea is registered with Heritage Victoria and given the register number VHR H1552.

== See also ==
- Thomas Embling Hospital
- Yarra Bend Asylum
- Yarra Bend Park
