= Melbourne Town Hall =

Town hall in Melbourne, Victoria, Australia

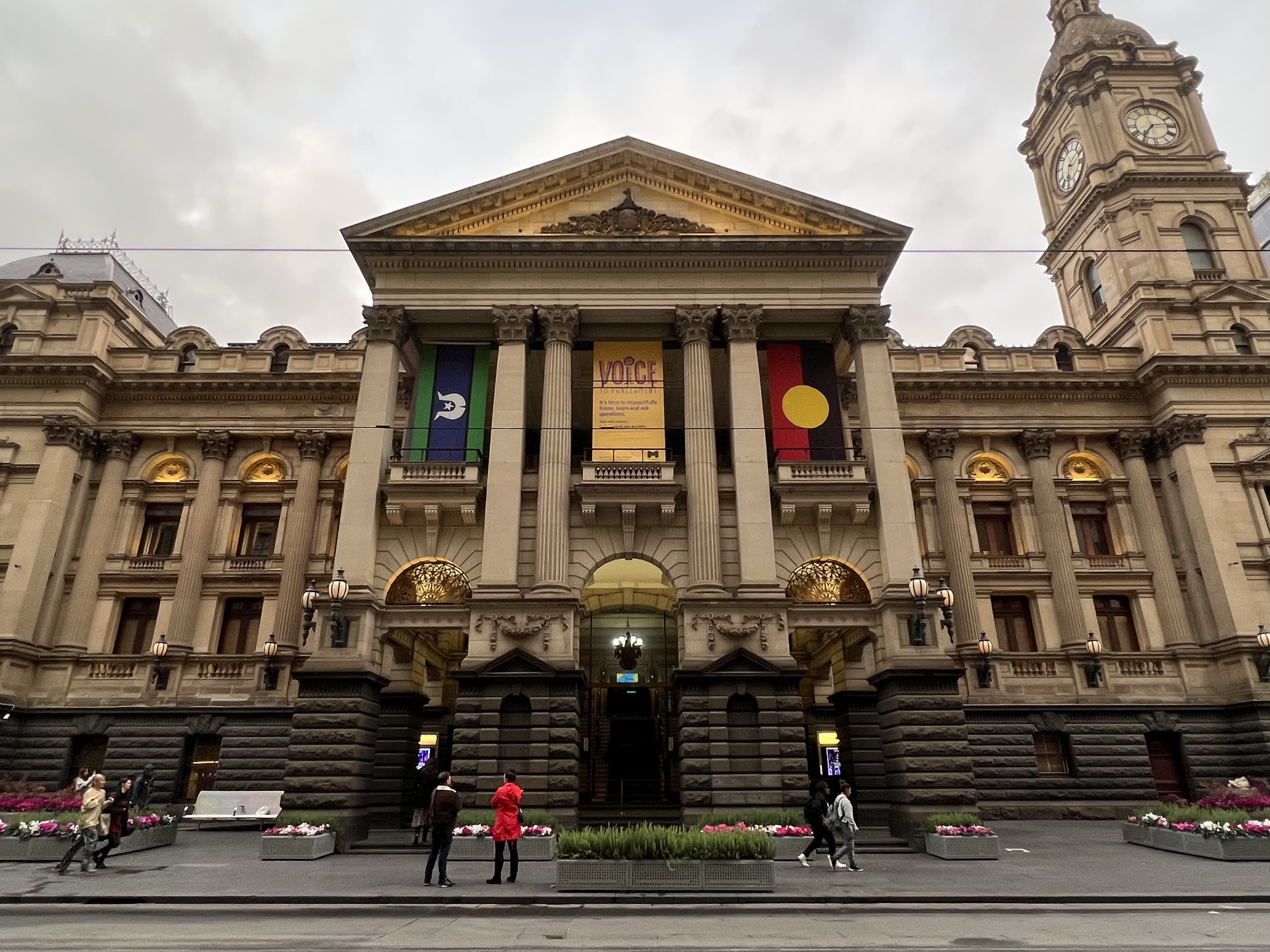
- Melbourne Town Hall, 2023

General information
- Status: Completed
- Type: Town hall
- Architectural style: Second Empire
- Location: 90-130 Swanston Street, Melbourne, Victoria, Australia
- Coordinates: 37°48′55″S 144°58′00″E
- Construction started: 1867
- Completed: 1887
- Owner: Council of the City of Melbourne

Design and construction
- Architects: Reed & Barnes; John James Clark

Other information
- Public transit: Town Hall City Square/Swanston Street (#11): 1, 3, 5, 6, 16, 64, 67, 72 Melbourne Town Hall/Collins St (#6): 11, 12, 48, 109

Victorian Heritage Register
- Official name: Melbourne Town Hall and Administration Building
- Type: Registered place
- Designated: 9 October 1974
- Reference no.: H0001
- Heritage overlay no.: HO746
- Categories: Community Facilities; Government and Administration

The Melbourne Town Hall, often referred to as simply Town Hall, is the administrative seat of the local municipality of the City of Melbourne and the primary offices of the Lord Mayor and city councillors of Melbourne. Located on the northeast corner of Swanston and Collins streets in the city centre of Melbourne, in Victoria, Australia, the building was completed in 1887 and was added to the Victorian Heritage Register in 1974 in recognition of its historical, architectural, aesthetic and social significance. The building is frequently used for art and cultural events such as concerts, festivals, theatrical plays and exhibitions.

Melbourne Town Hall is located on the traditional lands of the Wurundjeri.

== History ==
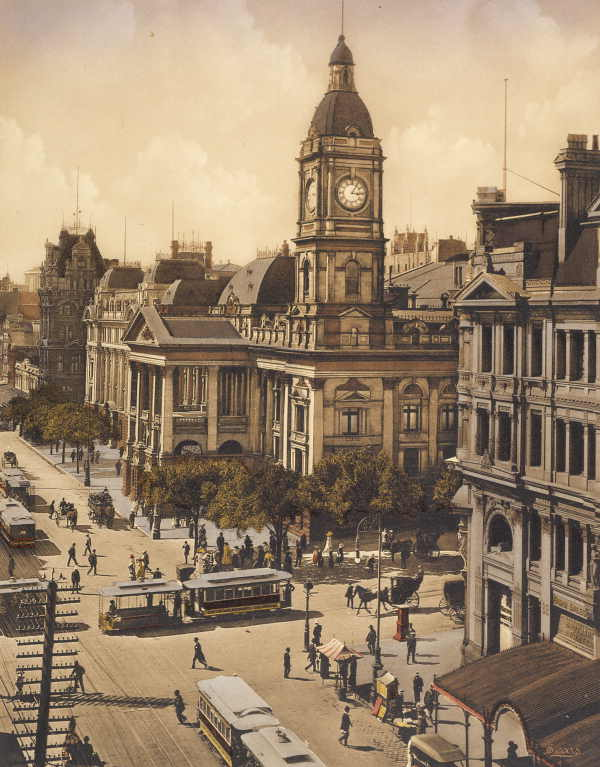
Melbourne Town Hall, 1910

Melbourne was officially incorporated as a town on 13 December 1842, with Henry Condell as its first Mayor. However, it was not until 1854 that its first town hall was completed. Begun in 1851, the work had been delayed following the beginning of the Victorian gold rush.

A design for a new, grander town hall was decided by a competition in 1866, won by Reed & Barnes, with detailed plans by John James Clark. The foundation stone was laid on 29 November 1867 by the visiting Prince Alfred, Duke of Edinburgh. The new town hall officially opened on 11 August 1870 with a lavish ball, which was personally funded by the Lord Mayor Samuel Amess.

The foundation stone of the additional front portico was laid in 1887, and Sir Henry Weedon laid the foundation of the administrative annex building on 27 August 1908. This was also designed by Reed & Barnes.

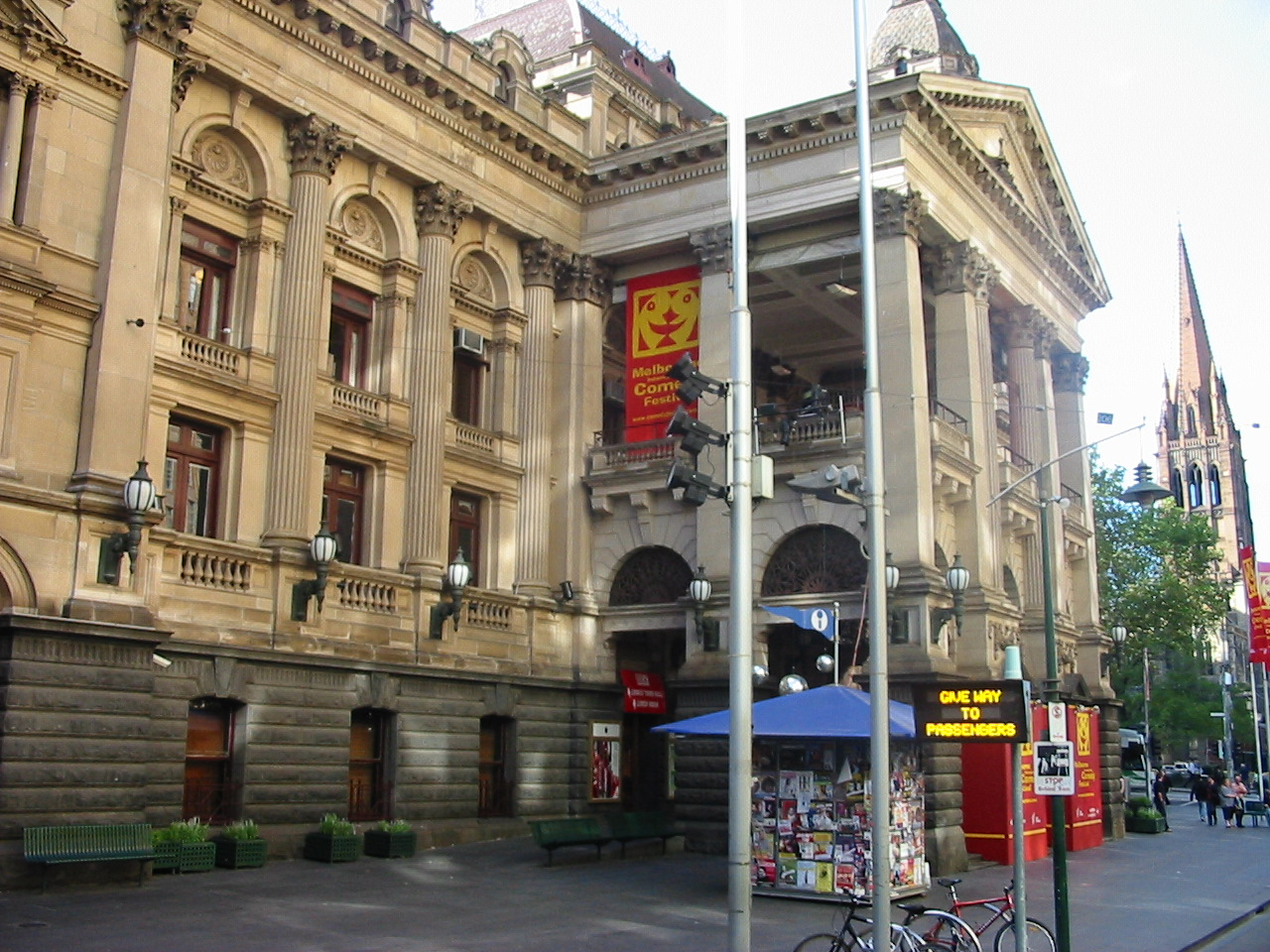
During the Melbourne International Comedy Festival the Melbourne Town Hall acts as venue to a large number of the performances.

An early cinema event Soldiers of the Cross created by the Salvation Army premiered at the Melbourne Town Hall on 13 September 1900 to an audience of about four thousand people.

In 1907 a competition for the Town Hall Administration wing, a large extension taking up the half block to the north, was won by Grainger, Kennedy & Little. Containing a new grand Council Chamber on the first floor, it opened in 1910.

In 1913, the city hired a hall keeper in his 30s named James "Jimmy" Dewar, a Scottish immigrant and Black Watch veteran from Dundee. He continued to work there loyally for 30 years. James lived with his wife and family in the Hall's penthouse, raising their children there, and retired in 1943. During their upbringing in the Town Hall, their only playing space was a small asphalt yard where the children went "pigeon-nesting" on the roof.

In his obituary in 1946, The Argus reported that James was a familiar face at the Hall in this era. In his duties, he greeted various visitors from locals to royals, including the French General Paul Pau, the Princes of Wales Edward VIII, and Prince Henry, the Duke of Gloucester. James was described as a "friend, guide, and philosopher" to many Lord Mayors of Melbourne. When opera singer Dame Nellie Melba performed at the Hall in 1928, she wanted to give an encore, but her piano had been packed up and there was no music. James lent her his piano from his upstairs penthouse so she could perform.

On 1 February 1925, a fire destroyed a large part of the town hall, including the main auditorium and pipe organ valued then at £15,000. It was rebuilt and enlarged, extending east over the site previously occupied by the Victoria Coffee Palace to the east, an early temperance hotel frequented by Melbourne's power brokers. The architects were Stephenson & Meldrum, who extended the Collins Street facade in matching style, but without Reed's elaborate mansard roof. The hall inside is in restrained classical style, with an arched coffered ceiling similar to the earlier hall.

In 1964, The Beatles attended a civic reception at the Melbourne Town Hall. "Outside 20,000 teenagers had gathered to obtain a glimpse of the pop idols. Again, frenzied and hysterical cheering and uncontrollable screaming erupted when the Beatles emerged."

== Architecture ==
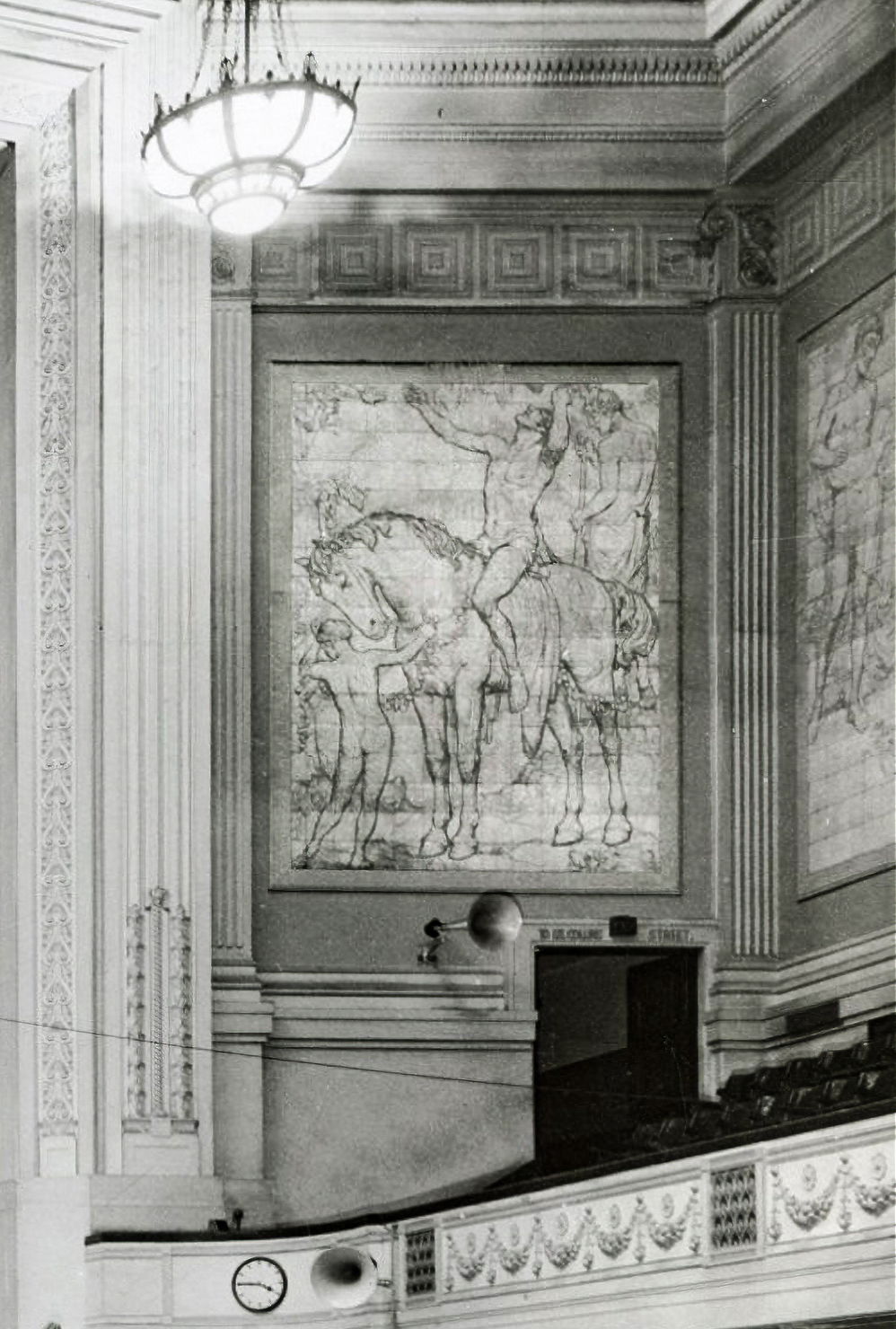
A Napier Waller mural in the Melbourne Town Hall Auditorium beside the proscenium arch

The Town Hall was designed by the famous local architect Joseph Reed of Reed & Barnes, in the Second Empire style. Reed's designs also included the State Library of Victoria, the Royal Exhibition Building, and Melbourne Trades Hall. The Town Hall features a rough bluestone base, and classical elements of repeating pilasters with arched window bays between, topped by a tall parapets with attic windows and mansard roofs.

The corner clocktower is known as Prince Alfred's Tower, named after the Duke of Edinburgh who laid the foundation stone. The clock is 2.44 m in diameter, and was started on 31 August 1874, after being presented to the council by the Mayor's son, Vallange Condell. It was built by Smith and Sons of London. The longest of its copper hands measures 1.19 m long, and weighs 8.85 kg.

The 1910 Administration extension is designed in matching style, but with an extra attic floor. The Council Chamber is a large space, featuring marble and bronze, and carvings and mouldings of Australian flora. Most woodwork including the furniture is solid Tasmanian blackwood, embellished with fiddleback panels and elaborate carving.

The building and the portico, excluding the interiors, were first classified on the basis of its Venetian Renaissance facade architecture by the National Trust in 1964 and reclassified in 1971.

The organ and the 1927 murals by Napier Waller commissioned for £1,700 (a 2021 value of A$138,340.00) are also classified as historically significant at the State level. They were painted directly in line onto the newly installed asbestos Celotex acoustic tiles in a redecoration of the Auditorium after a fire in 1925. Waller, who had been given a free hand in devising the artworks explained that the figures were not intended to be allegorical, but to create rhythm, and that line-work was used because a skin of paint would interfere with the panels' sound-absorbing quality. The actual painting on the series of 7 metre high by 4m wide wall sections from Waller's half-scale cartoons produced in his Darebin studio was undertaken by H. Oliver and Sons under the artist's supervision.

== Organ ==
The Main Auditorium includes a concert organ, now comprising 147 ranks and 9,568 pipes. The organ can be played by a fixed console located directly beneath the front pipes or by a secondary mobile console which is placed in close view of the audience for recitals. This organ is the largest and most comprehensive pipe organ in Australia by number of voices/stops; the Sydney Opera House organ has more pipes due to its entirely "straight" design, with no borrowing or duplexing, whereas the Melbourne Town Hall organ makes extensive use of borrowing in the pedal division. The organ is suited for romantic and symphonic works.

=== History of the organ ===
The organ was originally built by Hill & Son (of England) in 1872 before a fire destroyed it in 1925. A new organ constructed by Hill Norman & Beard was installed in 1929 and has since then been rebuilt and enlarged by Schantz Organ Company of the United States of America from 1995 to 2001 at a cost of $4.5 million. The rebuild included 2 new floating divisions (Fanfare & Bombarde), many new voices and a secondary moveable console.

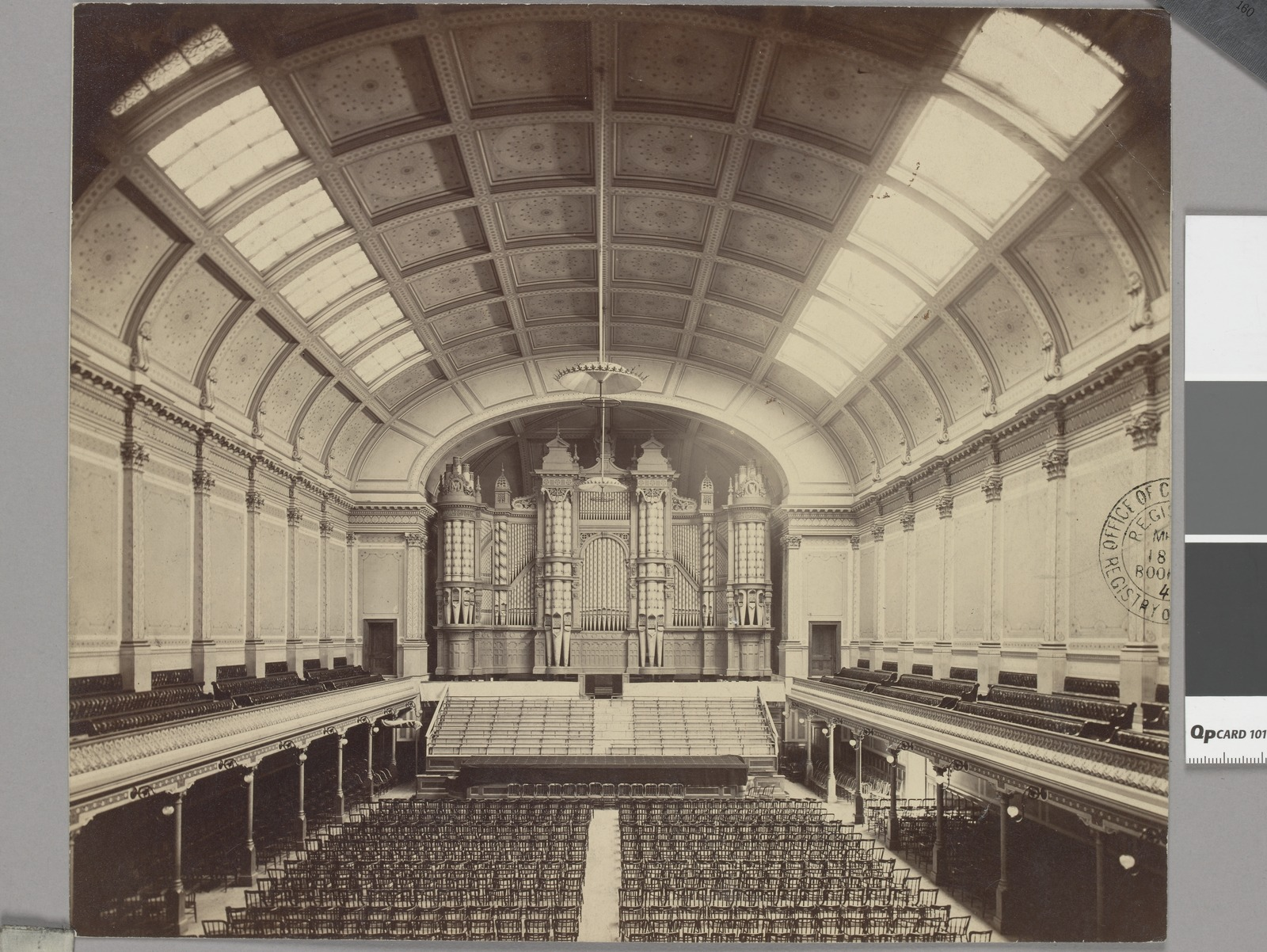
The Grand Organ, 1872, Charles Nettleton (State Library Victoria H96.160/2732)

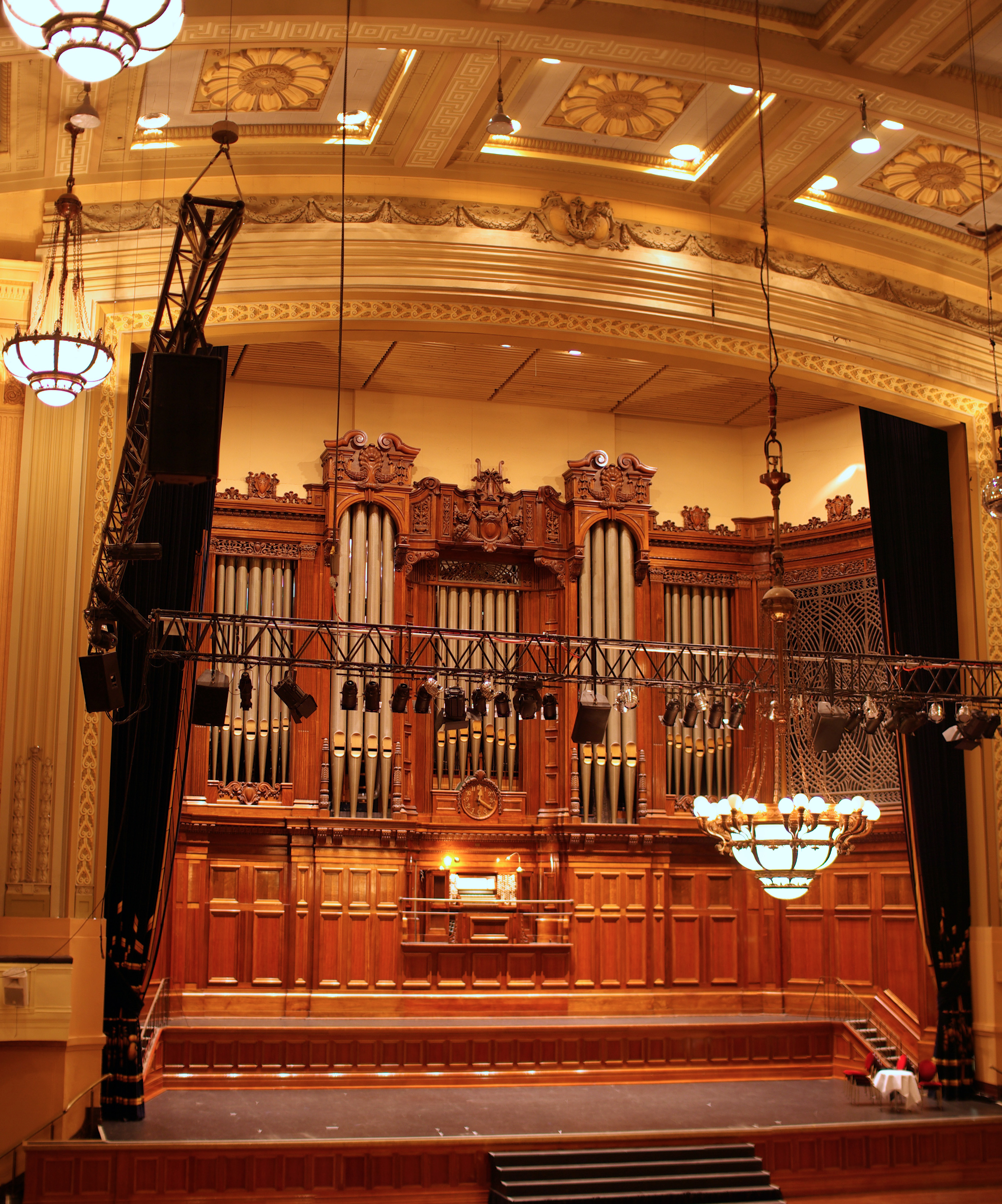
Melbourne Town Hall organ

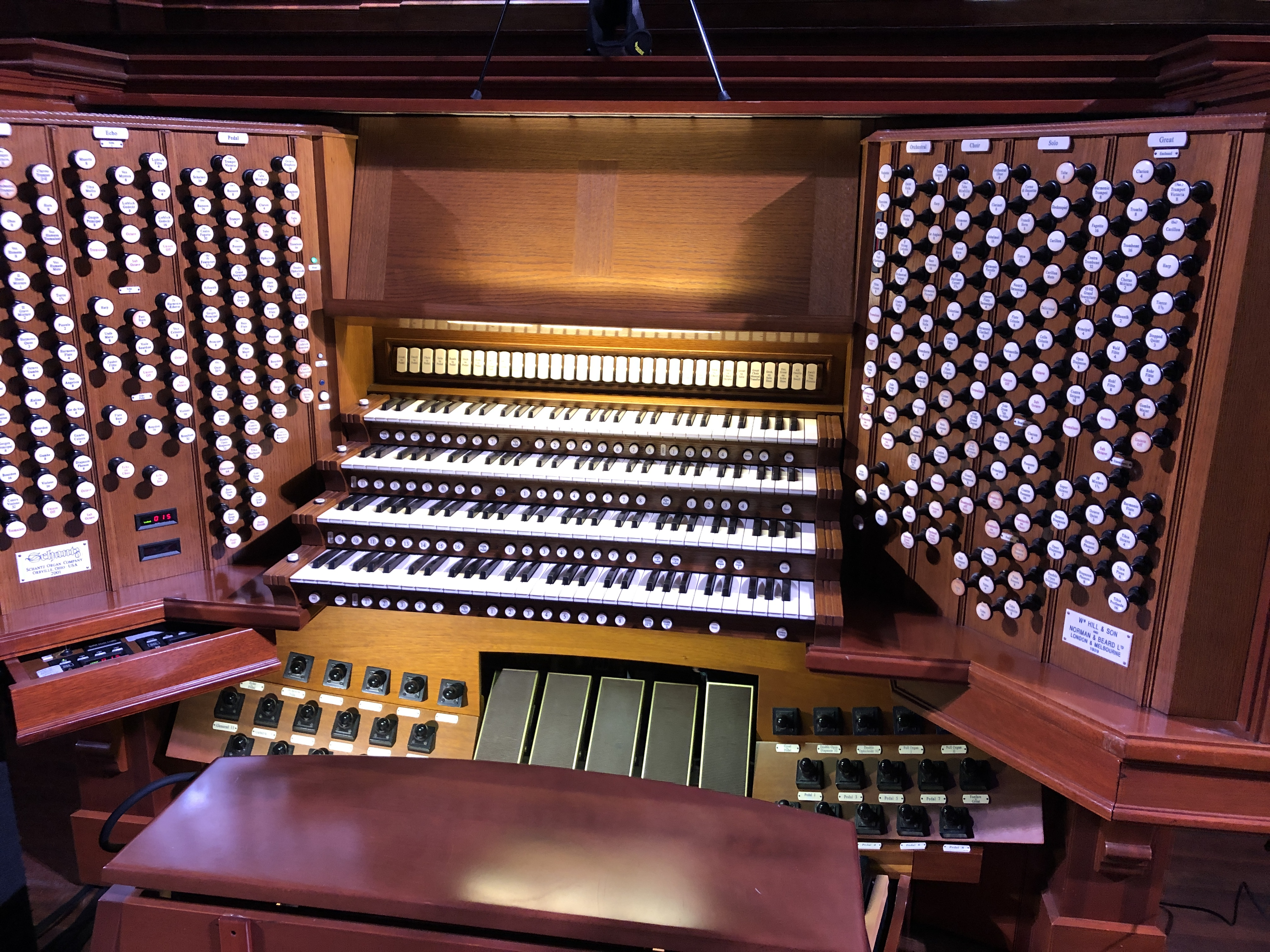
Console of the organ in 2019

=== Specification ===
The stop list is as follows:

I. Choir		II. Great		III. Swell		Pedal		IV. Solo		Bombarde	
Contra Salicional	16	Double Open Diapason	16	Contra Violone	32	Gravissima	64 (resaultant)	Quintaton	16	Grand Diapason	8
Horn Diapason	8	Tibia Profunda	16	Bourdon	16	Double Open Diapason	32	Harmonic Claribel	8	Principal	4
Corno Flute	8	Contra Geigen	16	Violine	16	Tibia Profunda	32	Flute Celeste	8	Grave Mixture	V-VI
Flute Celeste	II	Open Diapason I	8	Diapason Phonon	8	Contra Bourdon Acoustic	32	Violoncello	8	Fourniture	IV-V
Lieblich Gedeckt	8	Open Diapason II	8	Geigen Principal	8	Contra Violone	32	Cello Celeste	8	Grand Chorus	VI-VIII
Salicional	8	Diapason Phonon	8	Flauto Traverso	8	Open Diapason	16	Salicional	8	Contra Posaune	16
Voix Céleste	8	Tibia Plena	8	Cor de Nuit	8	Tibia Profunda	16	Concert Flute Harmonic	4	Posaune	8
Lieblich Flöte	4	Harmonic Flute	8	Bourdon	8	Great Bass	16	Nazard Harmonique	2 2/3	Clarion	4
Gemshorn	4	Hohl Flöte	8	Gamba	8	Bourdon	16	Harmonic Piccolo	2		
Echo Viola	4	Rohr Flöte	8	Gamba Celeste	8	Lieblich Bourdon	16	Tierce	1 3/5		
Harmonic Piccolo	2	Gamba Major	8	Aeoline	8	Contra Bass	16	Schalmei	16		
Dulciana Cornet	III	Octave Diapason	4	Vox Angelica	8	Violone	16	Tuba	8		
Tuba Sonora	8	Octave Phonon	4	Principal	4	Geigen	16	French Horn	8		
Cor Anglais	8	Principal	4	Harmonic Flute	4	Contra Salicional	16	Corno di Bassetto	8		
Closed Horn	8	Tibia Octave	4	Rohr Flute	4	String Bass	16	Clarinet	8		
Cremona	8	Wald Flöte	4	Octave Gamba	4	Quint	10 2/3	Orchestral Oboe	8		
		Octave Quint	2 2/3	Harmonic Quint	2 2/3	Prestant	8	Fanfare		Orchestral	
		Stopped Quint	2 2/3	Piccolo	2	Principal	8	Tuba	16	Contra Viola	16
		Super Octave	2	Salicetina	2	Geigen Principal	8	Sub Trumpet	16	Tibia Clausa	8
		Fifteenth	2	Tierce	1 3/5	Flute Major	8	Tuba Sonora	8	Viol d'Orchestre	II
		Tierce	1 3/5	Chorus Mixture	V	Bass Flute	8	Tuba	8	Orchestral Strings	II
		Grand Fourniture	VI-VII	Grave Mixture	III	Stopped Flute	8	Trumpet Victoria	8	String Celeste	II
		Chorus Mixture	V	Sharp Mixture	III	Lieblich Bourdon	8	Octave Sonora	4	Octave Viola	4
		Mixture	IV	Double Trumpet	16	Violoncello	8	Tuba	4	Orchestral Strings	
		Contra Trombone	32	Bassoon	16	Super Octave	4				
		Trombone	16	Cornopean	8	Fifteenth	4				
		Fagotto	16	Trumpet Victoria	8	Open Flute	4				
		Trumpet Victoria	8	Orchestral Trumpet	8	Grand Fourniture	VI				
		Tromba	8	Horn	8	Fourniture	IV				
		Harmonic Trumpet	8	Oboe	8	Diaphone	32				
		Clarion	4	Vox Humana	8	Double Ophicleide	32				
				Clairon	4	Contra Fagotto	32				
						Tuba	16				
						Octave Diaphone	16				
						Ophicleide	16				
						Posaune	16				
						Trombone	16				
						Bassoon	16				
						Schalmei	16				
						Tuba	8				
						Trumpet Victoria	8				
						Trumpet	8				
						Bassoon	8				
						Clarion	4				

== See also ==
- List of Town Halls in Melbourne
- List of Mayors and Lord Mayors of Melbourne
- Architecture of Melbourne
- List of heritage-listed buildings in Melbourne
