= Collingwood Stockade =

Demolished penal stockade in Victoria, Australia

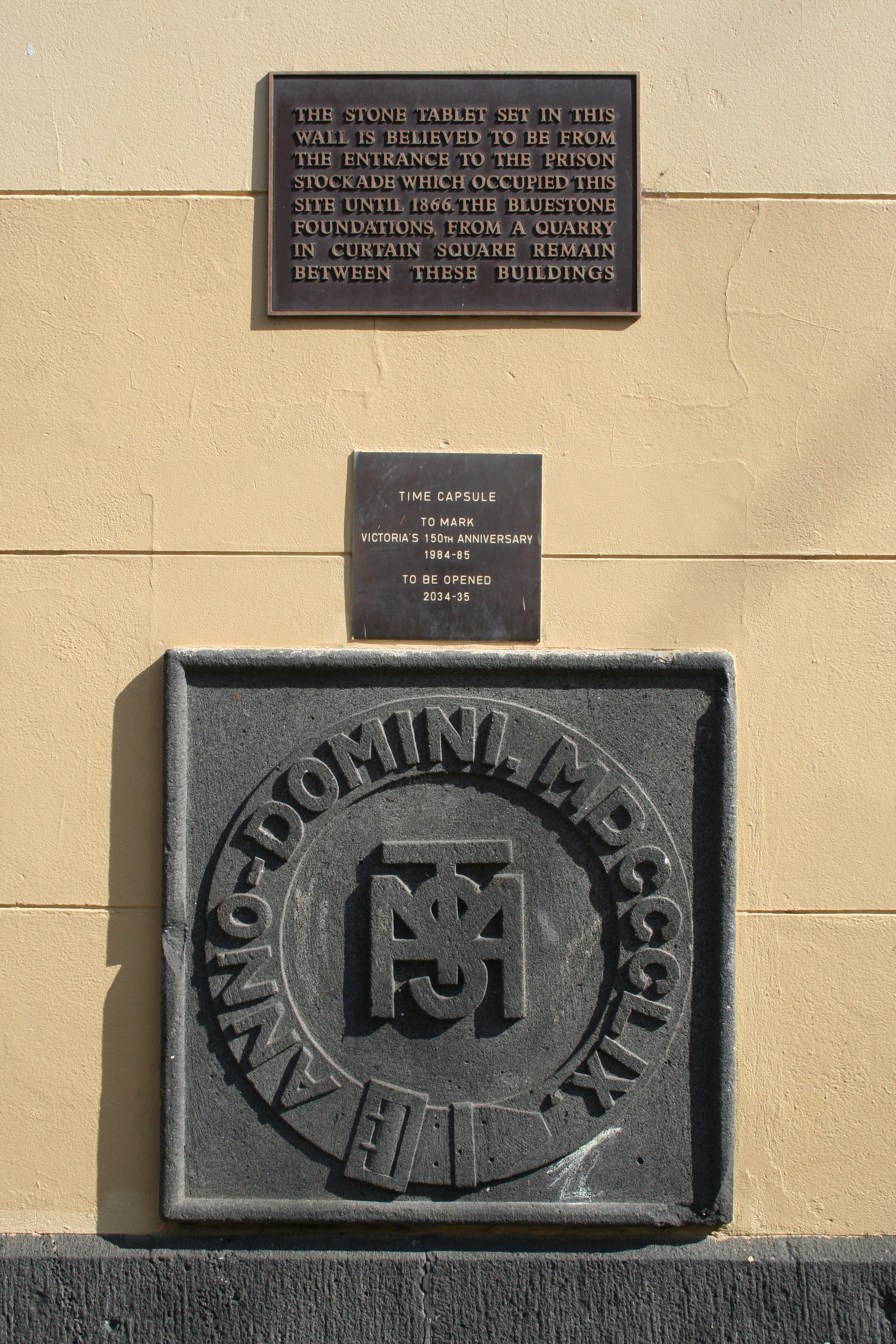
- Bluestone slab believed to have been part of the Stockade, now in Lee St School, Carlton
- Interactive map of Collingwood Stockade
- Location: Carlton North, Victoria; 37.79094°S 144.97316°E
- Status: Demolished
- Security class: Stockade
- Capacity: 300
- Opened: 1853
- Closed: 1866

Collingwood Stockade was a penal stockade in modern-day Carlton North, Victoria, Australia. It was built in 1853 and was in use until 1866 when it was converted into an asylum, which then closed in 1873. The stockade no longer exists but the area has several reminders of it, including the Stockade Hotel on Nicholson Street and Lee St Primary School which is built on the site of the old stockade buildings.

== Stockade ==
One of four stockades in the Melbourne area at the time, Collingwood Stockade opened on 3 February 1853. Originally built to house 60 prisoners, it was only ever intended as a temporary structure and was constructed of wood, which made life somewhat easier for prisoners who wished to escape. The buildings initially comprised a main hall with three dormitories, although extra wings and bluestone buildings were added later, and by 1855 it could house 300 prisoners. The stockade was on 6 acres (2.4 ha) of grounds bordered by what are now Newry Street to the north, Princes Street to the south, Canning Street to the east and Rathdowne Street to the west. Prisoners could obtain remission of their sentences by working in the bluestone quarry in what is now Curtain Square, or by attending educational classes and Sunday school.

== Asylum ==
Demand for land, public animosity toward the stockade and prison reform led to the stockade's closure. All prisoners were transferred to the new prison at Pentridge, and in August 1866 the stockade became an asylum, initially for mentally ill prisoners from other jails, and then as a public asylum with both short- and long-term wards. In 1868 Collingwood ceased to admit acute patients who had previously been retained in the gaols. The recently opened country asylums at Ararat and Beechworth had eased the pressure on Collingwood to accommodate those patients, thus Collingwood became an establishment for the accommodation of the intellectually disabled. With the opening of the Kew Asylum in 1872, Collingwood ceased to function as an independent institution, and functioned merely as a ward of Kew. In June 1873 all patients were transferred from Collingwood to Kew, and the building passed to the Education Department.

== School ==
On 3 June 1873 the Rev. C. S. Perry suggested that the Collingwood Lunatic Asylum should be secured for State School purposes. This proposal met with approval and on 16 June 1873 the last of the asylum inmates were transferred to Kew and the Collingwood site was officially made available to the Education Department as of 17 June. As with the two previous establishments on the site, the school was to have been a temporary measure until a North Fitzroy school was completed; a temporary measure which continues to this day. The school buildings were in a poor state of repair, and the majority were replaced by the existing school buildings in 1878. In 1879 the school changed its name to Lee Street State School. Only two buildings survived into the twentieth century – the Governors House and Prisoner's mess. The Prisoner's Mess was one of the earliest buildings of the stockade. Constructed out of timber and iron, it was used as the school's shelter shed until the 1920s when it was demolished. The Governors House later became the school principal's residence and was also demolished in 1913 after it had fallen into a state of disrepair. The present day school has a bluestone slab thought to have been part of the Governor's House which reads H.M.S. (Her Majesty's Stockade) T.M.S. (Thomas Malcolm Smith, the first Governor).
