= Kew Asylum =

Former hospital in Victoria, Australia

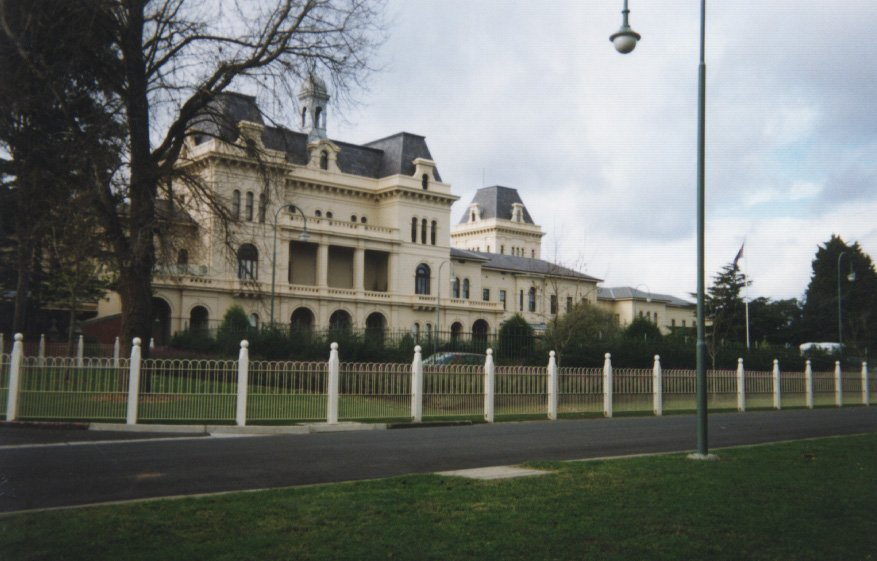
- Kew Asylum c. 1990

Geography
- Location: Kew, Melbourne, Victoria, Australia
- Coordinates: 37°47′42″S 145°01′25″E

Organisation
- Care system: Medicare; Private
- Type: Psychiatric hospital

Services
- Beds: 1,000 +

History
- Founded: 1871
- Closed: 1988

Links
- Lists: Hospitals in Australia
- Other links: List of Australian psychiatric institutions
- Building details

General information
- Status: Complete; preserved
- Type: Hospital
- Architectural style: Italianate architecture
- Year built: 1864–1872

Design and construction
- Architects: G. W. Vivian; Frederick Kawerau

Victorian Heritage Register
- Official name: Former Willsmere Hospital
- Type: Registered Place
- Designated: 20 August 1982
- Reference no.: H0861
- Heritage overlay no.: HO109
- Categories: Health Services; Institutional Places

Register of the National Estate
- Official name: Willsmere Hospital (former)
- Type: Defunct register
- Designated: March 1978
- Reference no.: 5684

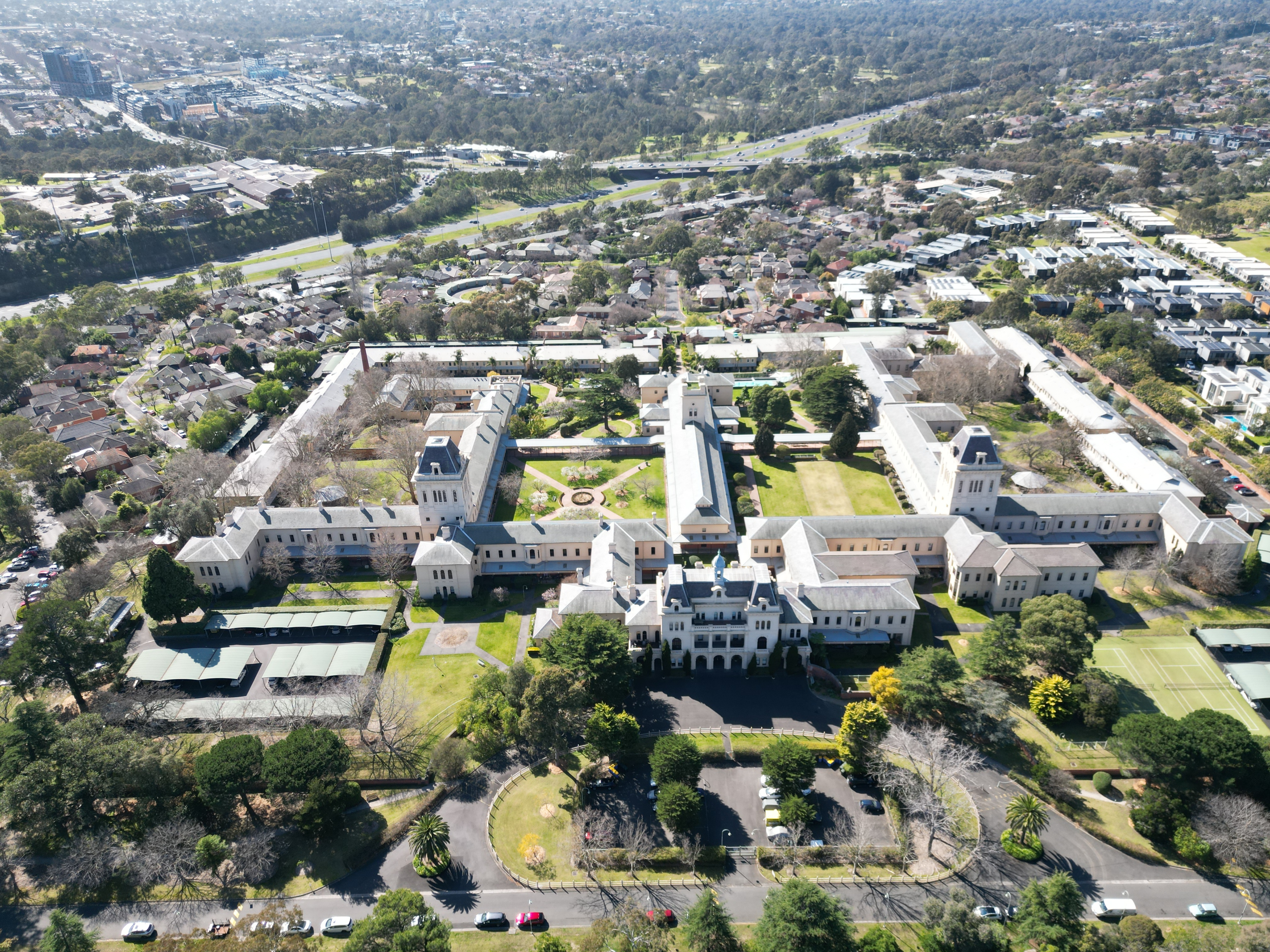
The former Kew Asylum is now known as the Willsmere

Kew Lunatic Asylum is a decommissioned psychiatric hospital located between Princess Street and Yarra Boulevard in Kew, a suburb of Melbourne, Australia. Operational from 1871 to 1988, Kew Asylum was one of the largest asylums ever built in Australia. Later known as Willsmere, the complex of buildings were constructed between 1864 and 1872 to the design of architects G. W. Vivian and Frederick Kawerau of the Victorian Public Works Office to house the growing number of "lunatics", "inebriates", and "idiots" in the Colony of Victoria.

The first purpose-built asylum in the Colony of Victoria, Kew was also larger and more expensive than its sister asylums at Ararat and Beechworth. The asylum's buildings are typical examples of the Italianate architecture style which was popular in Victorian Melbourne. Designed to be elegant, beautiful, yet substantial, and to be viewed as "a magnificent asylum for the insane" with the aim of portraying Melbourne as a civilised and benevolent city whilst avoiding the jail-like appearance of other asylums. These aims were furthered by the use of low ha-ha walls and extensively landscaped grounds. The complex was added to the Victorian Heritage Register on 20 August 1982 in recognition of its historic and architectural significance, and to the now defunct Register of the National Estate in March 1978.

Despite initial grand plans and ideals, Kew Asylum had a difficult and chequered history, contributing to several inquiries throughout its 117 years of operation, including a Royal Commission. Overcrowding, mismanagement, lack of resources, poor sanitation and diseases were common criticisms during the asylum's first five decades; out-dated facilities and institutionalisation were criticisms of Kew's later period.

Kew continued to operate throughout the 20th century as a "hospital for the insane", "mental hospital", or "psychiatric hospital", treating acute, long-term and geriatric patients until it closed in December 1988. The main building and surrounding grounds were sold by the Victorian Government in the 1980s and were redeveloped as residential properties.

== Site and planning ==
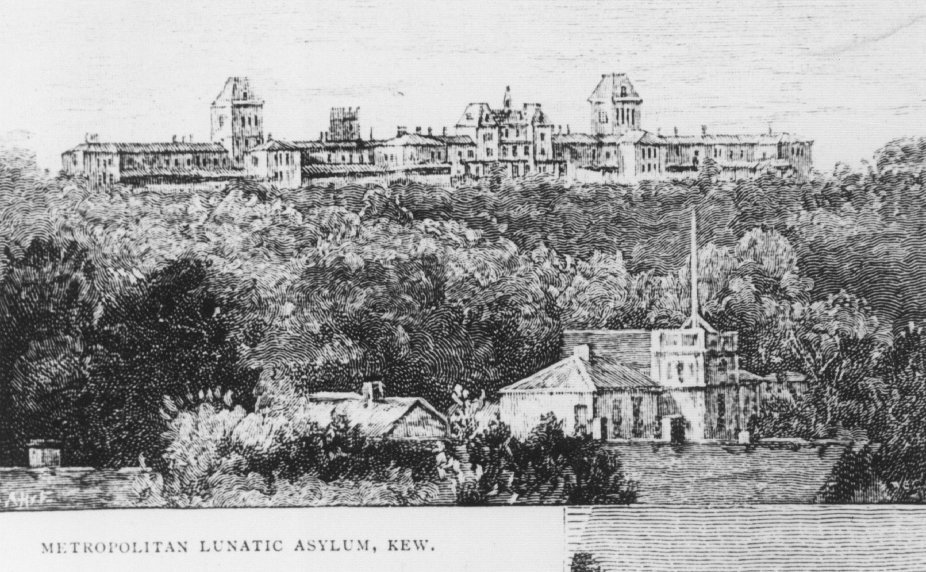
Engraving of Kew Asylum circa 1880. Buildings of Yarra Bend Asylum are depicted in the foreground.

During the 1850s, the existing lunatic asylums of the Colony of Victoria were overcrowded. Yarra Bend Asylum, while only six years old, was considered unsuitable and Carlton Lunatic Asylum (which was originally a gaol) was in a state of disrepair. As a result, in 1854 the Government of the Colony of Victoria commissioned a report proposing sites and designs for a new lunatic asylum. Contemporary educated opinion was that lunatic asylums should be built "on a healthy site, freely admitting light and air, and drainage ...[on] a gentle eminence in a fertile and agreeable country". In a report by the New South Wales' Inspector of Asylums, Frederick Norton Manning stated that "the site chosen is of primary importance. On it must depend the comfort, happiness and health of the inmates." Thus a hilltop site, across the Yarra River from Yarra Bend was recommended in a report by G.W. Vivian of the Public Works Office. Vivian described the site as:

a section of land, about 400 acres in extent, situated on the River Yarra, about 4 miles from Melbourne, and ½ a mile to the north of the village of Kew ... the site selected is a fine slope, elevated about 100 feet above the level of the river, admitting of proper drainage and admirably adapted for ornamental grounds, the aspect chosen is south-east, and during the summer months the refreshing influence of the sea-breeze will be felt, without being exposed to south west gales.

G. W. Vivian, Report on the Proposed Kew Lunatic Asylum

The idea that breezes or wind-swept locations were healthy came from a wider Victorian belief that associated disease with congestion and squalor, and that miasmas of impure air caused epidemics. The area Vivian recommended for the asylum had originally been set aside for a village reserve. Locals from Kew were upset by the proposal and petitioned the government, to no avail. 340 acres (1.4 km^{2}; 0.5 sq mi) of land in the County of Bourke, parish of Boroondara, city of Kew were permanently reserved as a "Site for Lunatic Asylum" in the Government Gazette of 1864. Construction began in 1864, however was halted almost immediately with reports of inferior works on the foundations. An investigation followed and Frederick Kawerau resigned. Contractor Samuel Amess continued construction at Kew using Kawerau's designs. They were derived from plans earlier outlined by Vivian, and were basically identical to Kawerau's designs for Ararat and Beechworth, though Kew was much larger, and more expensive at a cost of £198,334.

== Distinctive features ==
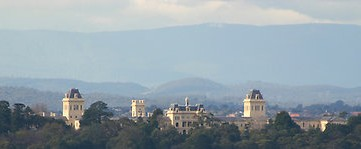
Skyline of the Kew Asylum

The asylum complex is an example of the E-plan lunatic asylums based on the model 1850s asylum in Colney Hatch, England, which itself was based on the 1830 design of Hanwell Asylum in London. Kew was also considered a barracks style asylum due to its perceived resemblance to stockades or gaols. The buildings are constructed from oversize bricks, made from local clay which was quarried on-site. The bricks were then rendered with cement. The central administration block is three storied with a mansard roof and cupola. Two storeyed ward wings extend to each side, one for each sex. Each wing has a four-storey, mansard-roofed tower, which contained water tanks. The ward wings were surrounded by courtyards lined with iron columned verandas, many of which were retained when the complex was redeveloped. Internally, the dormitories had 14 ft (4.3 m) ceilings and brightly coloured walls with the beds aligned in neat rows. The floors were of timber, principally so they could be scrubbed. The primary access to the complex was from a tree-lined drive from Princess Street (now known as "Main Drive") culminating in an elliptical carriageway in front of the main building. A second drive (now known as "Lower Drive") extended from Princess Street to the rear gates of the asylum. This road was commonly used for deliveries to and from the asylum via the rear gatehouse.

While Kew's plan and detail are similar to its sister asylums at Ararat and Beechworth, the Kew asylum is much larger with the front buildings and towers more impressive architecturally. Kew's distinctive towers and mansard roofs make it one of the most prominent architectural landmarks in Melbourne and is clearly visible on the eastern skyline.

=== Ha-Ha walls ===
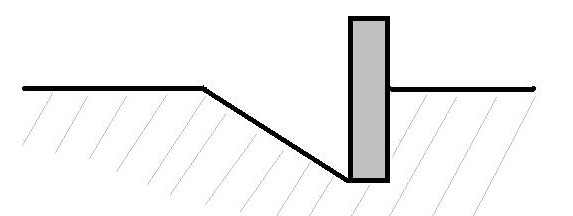
Cross section of a Ha-Ha wall at Kew Asylum

Another distinctive feature of Kew Asylum and its sister asylums is the use of a variation on ha-ha walls around the patients' courtyards. They consisted of a trench, one side of which was vertical and faced with stone or bricks, the other side sloped and turfed. From the inside, the walls presented a tall face to patients, deterring them from escaping, while from outside the walls looked low so as not to suggest imprisonment. A journalist with The Argus described the walls as an "excellent arrangement, as it enables the patients to see the outside world, and does away with that gaol appearance and feeling inculcated by the walls of the old asylums". Many of Kew's ha-ha walls were retained and remain intact, unlike those at Beechworth and Ararat which were partially dismantled or the trenches were filled in.

=== Grounds and landscaping ===
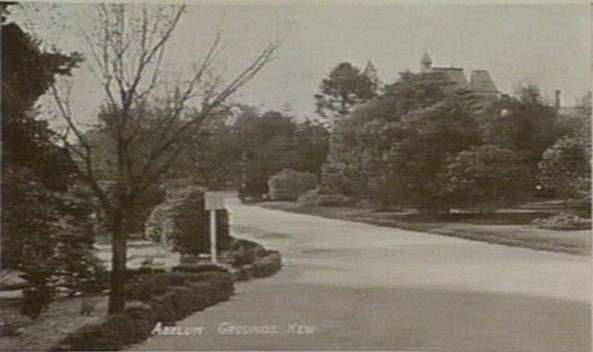
Asylum grounds, circa 1890

The grounds of the Kew Asylum were originally landscaped in the tradition of an English country park. This was consistent with the Victorian idea that pleasant or beautiful surroundings would help ease the mental anguish of the inmates. It has been proposed that the initial plantings on the site were supplied by Baron Ferdinand von Mueller, director of the Botanic Gardens. Initially, the grounds were planted with many conifers and large growing trees, oaks, elms and Moreton Bay figs; and trees indigenous to the area, river red gum, yellow box, and lightwood were retained in the landscape. In 1913 the landscape gardener Hugh Linaker was employed to lay out the grounds of Mont Park Asylum. As landscape gardener for the State Lunacy Department he commenced a program of landscape improvements and tree plantings at other asylums in Victoria, including Kew.

The conifer plantings and oak avenues along Main and Lower Drives were well established and of a mature size by the 1940s. Conifers were widely planted from the 1860s along with Moreton Bay figs and occasionally oaks. Oaks and elms were more widely planted from the 1880s. It is not known if Linaker was responsible for the oak avenues, but it appears that many of the conifers, Monterey pines, Canary Island pines, Monterey cypress, hoop pine, bunya-bunya pines and Himalayan cedars, predate Linaker and the oaks and elms may have been planted soon after his appointment. The use of Bhutan cypress in the landscape is almost certainly due to Linaker as he favoured upright trees. It is possible that the two remnant Monterey cypress along Main Drive and a Monterey pine along Lower Drive are trees from an earlier planting scheme. Several trees and plants on the grounds of Kew Asylum and Kew Cottages have been classified as of historical significance by the Victorian Heritage Council and the National Trust of Australia (Victoria), and have been protected during the property's redevelopment.

In addition to the asylum's ornamental gardens, the grounds featured vegetable gardens, farms and recreational areas such as cricket ovals and bowling greens. Little evidence remains of these structures except that there is now a road that encircles the former cricket oval.

== Patients ==
Many of Kew's early patients were transferred from Yarra Bend Asylum and Carlton Lunatic Asylum and were housed in the two main wings — men in the right wing, women in the left. The wards were dormitory style and were divided by patient type — male/female, paying/pauper, manageable/refractory. The area of the women's wards was smaller due to the laundries and drying courtyards being located on the women's side of the asylum.

=== Admission process ===
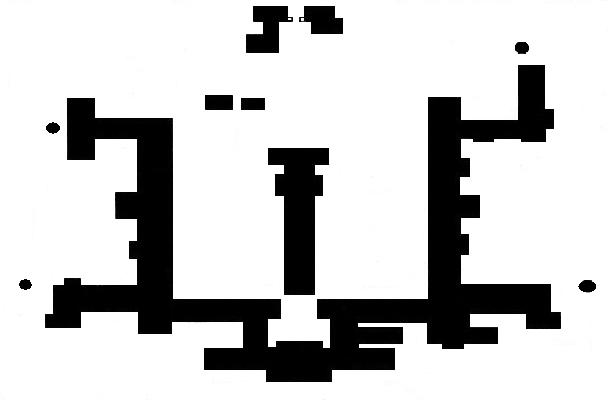
Overview of the building's layout. Female wards were accommodated in the left-hand wing; males in the right. The administration areas were in the front building and the centre wing. The small, round buildings are the privies.

Under the Lunacy Statute of 1867, Lunacy Acts from 1880 to 1928 and Mental Hygiene Act of 1933, people could be admitted to the asylum by a number of means:

- At the request of a friend, relative or acquaintance, with medical certificates written by two medical practitioners. This method was amended by The Mental Health Act 1959 which stated a person could be admitted upon the recommendation of a medical practitioner who had examined the person. As soon as possible after admission the superintendent of the hospital was required to examine the patient and either approve the recommended admission or discharge the patient.
- Any (lunatic) person found wandering at large or not under proper care and control could be brought before two justices who could order the person's removal to an asylum. The police were usually responsible for bringing the person before the two justices.
- Any prisoner of the Crown thought to be a lunatic could be removed from a jail to an asylum by order of the Chief Secretary.
- Voluntary Boarders were those who requested that they be admitted for a mutually agreed period of time (from 1915 onwards).

Until the end of World War I, there was little change in the admission process at Kew. Upon arriving, a variable amount of data was collected on the person being admitted. These basic details included age, sex, marital status and former address (or name of the asylum/jail transferred from). Other details requested included names of relatives or friends, the person's religion and occupation and whether others in the family have ever been classified as insane. Other information recorded, where available, were dates of previous admissions, "form of mental disorder", bodily condition ("satisfactory", "unsatisfactory", "feeble", etc.) and "duration of existing attack". From approximately 1900 onwards, photographs were usually taken on admission. If the person was very restless, the photograph was omitted. Belongings, such as books, clothes, and spectacles were often returned to friends or family. Inmates were required to dress in institutional clothes. This was useful in a number of ways as it assisted the public in easily identifying escaped inmates; reduced the need to request clothes (or money for clothes) from the inmate's family or their estate; and minimised inmate conflict when inmates swapped or stole clothes from each other. The property and estates of people who were deemed to be insane were controlled and administered by the Master-in-Equity, also known as the Master-in-Lunacy.

=== Diagnoses ===
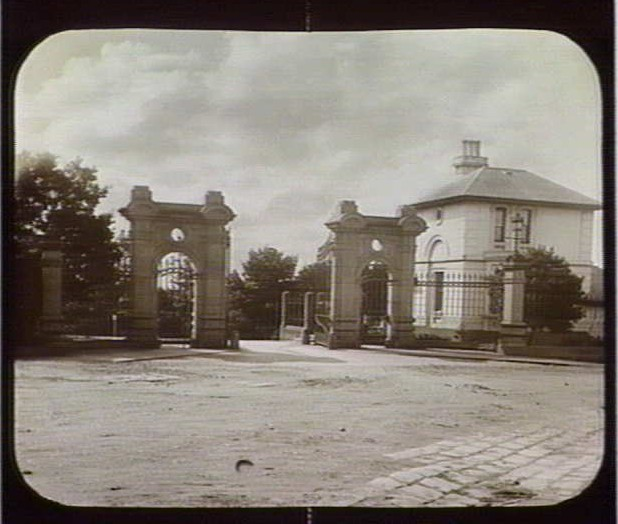
Entrance gates and gatehouse of Kew Asylum, c. 1880. The gate house was demolished and the gates moved to Victoria Park, Kew in the 1930s or 1940s to facilitate the straightening of Princess Street.

The diagnoses given to patients during Kew's first fifty years were the common ailments found in most lunatic asylums of the pre-Kraepelin era

- Delusional insanity
- Dementia
- Epilepsy
- General paralysis/paresis of the insane
- Idiocy
- Inebriation
- Melancholia
- Puerperal mania

Some of these terms are still in use today, however they may now have different meanings. For example, from examining the notes on some of Kew's early "dementia" patients, it can be deduced that many were most likely suffering from what we now term severe depression, catatonia or schizophrenia.

=== Children at Kew ===
In the early days of Kew Asylum, the distinction between "lunatics" and "idiots" (or "imbeciles") was not made. Therefore, many wards of the state, "difficult" children and children with intellectual disability were housed with the adults at Kew. By 1879 nearly 600 children, representing a quarter of all inmates, were accommodated in various institutions in Victoria. In the 1880s the government decided that a separate building should be built to accommodate child inmates. The Zox Commission recommended the Yarra Bend Asylum site as appropriate for buildings for "imbecile" children. However, a site between the main building and the entrance gates of Kew was chosen and in 1885 a contract was let for the erection of cottage units. The Kew Idiot Ward (Kew Cottages) was opened in May 1887. The Idiot Ward was initially considered a ward of Kew Lunatic Asylum, however later became known as a separate institution – Kew Idiot Asylum. Although the Idiot Asylum only admitted children, many of those children remained in residence at the Cottages as adults.

=== Inebriates at Kew ===
Under the Lunacy Statute of 1867, the Master-in-Lunacy was able commit inebriates to an asylum for any period up to twelve months. Inebriates who were able to pay the lodging fees at private inebriate asylums were able to be housed in inebriate-specific institutions such as Northcote Inebriate Asylum. Paupers were placed in lunatic asylums. After the 1888 Zox Commission into Asylums, all private/semi-private inebriate asylums were abolished under the provisions of the Inebriate Asylums Act 1888. Northcote was taken over by the Government of Victoria in 1890 and converted into a public inebriate retreat. Brightside and Lara Inebriate Retreats were opened soon after, and many alcoholics were moved out of the lunatic asylums.

=== Famous patients ===
- Ambrose Dyson (1876 - 1913) Political cartoonist and satirist. Died in Kew Asylum.
- Edward De Lacy Evans – Picaresque transgender man from the 1870s.
- Bill Farnan (1851 – 1891) Australia's first heavyweight boxing champion. Later died in his home 1891.
- Patrick McShane – Test cricketer & umpire. Died in Kew Asylum in 1903.
- Billy Midwinter – Test cricketer who played for both Australia and England. Died in Kew Asylum in 1890.
- Paris Nesbit – barrister, politician and newspaper editor.
- Thomas Quinlan (1881 - 1951) Musical impresario
- Walter Richardson – father of Henry Handel Richardson, Australian author.
- Harry Trott – Australian Test cricketer and Australian team captain.
- Tom Wills – Victorian cricketer, one of the founders of Australian rules football.

== Investigations and inquiries ==
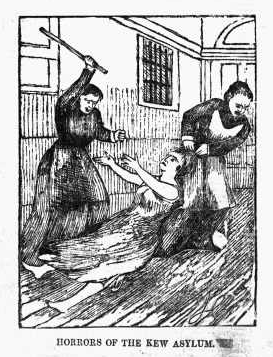
Woodcut from 1876

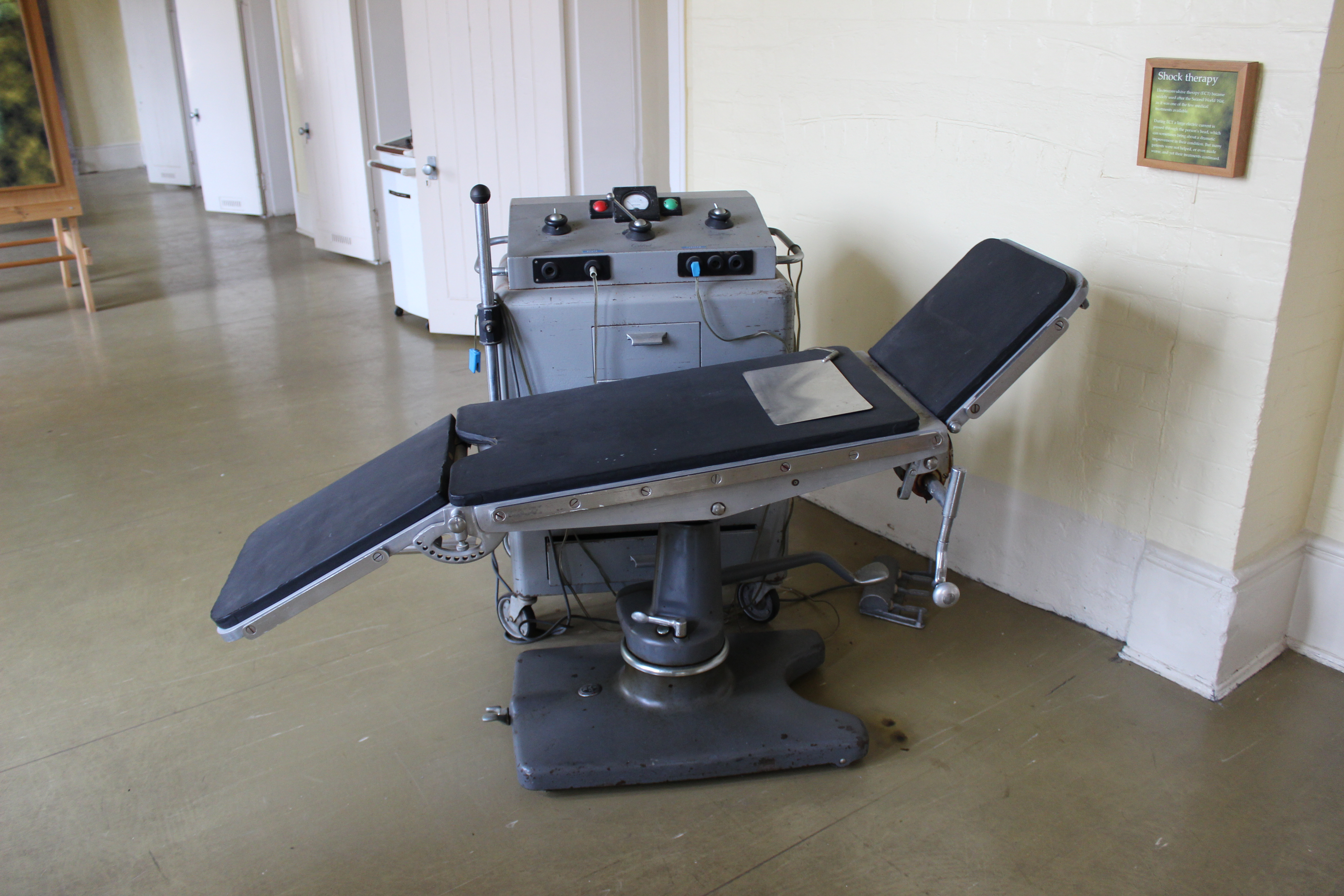
Electrosurgical machine at former Kew Asylum, currently in the on-site museum

Despite initial grand plans and ideals, Kew Asylum had a difficult and chequered history resulting in several inquiries, including a Royal Commission. The first inquiry occurred in 1876, only five years after Kew opened. Another notable inquiry occurred in 1907 after a severe outbreak of Typhoid fever, which at the time was thought to have been virtually eradicated in Melbourne. This inquiry in turn led to amendments to the Lunacy Act, improvements to Kew (and the state's other asylums) and the planned construction of Mont Park Asylum.

=== Zox Royal Commission ===
Public outcry at the treatment of the insane in the colony's lunatic asylums increased in the 1870s, fueled by articles and woodcuts in magazines and the writings of "The Vagabond" in The Argus. Officially known as Royal Commission on Asylums for the Insane and Inebriate 1884–1886, the Royal Commission chaired by Ephraim Zox was required to inquire into and report upon the state and condition of Asylums for the Insane and Inebriates, both public and private. The Royal Commission made some sixty five recommendations in its final report. A number of the commission's recommendations were implemented prior to the presentation of its final report, others were implemented through the Lunacy Amendment Act 1888 and some recommendations were not implemented until proclamation of the Lunacy Act 1903 in 1905.

The Commission recommended that criminal patients be kept apart from other patients; thus male criminally insane patients were moved to J Ward of the Ararat Asylum and female dangerous patients to Sunbury Asylum.

The commission also recommended that inebriates and idiots be housed in asylums separate from the insane which led to the construction of Kew Idiot Ward and various Inebriate Asylums.

The Zox Commission further recommended increasing the role of medical doctors at the asylums and that "Medical men have the sole and exclusive right to determine whether their fellow citizens are sane or insane. The medical expert therefore stands in the position of witness, jury and judge". Prior to (and in some instances, for a time after) the Zox Commission, many superintendents at asylums did not have any training in insanity.

== Changing names, changing society ==
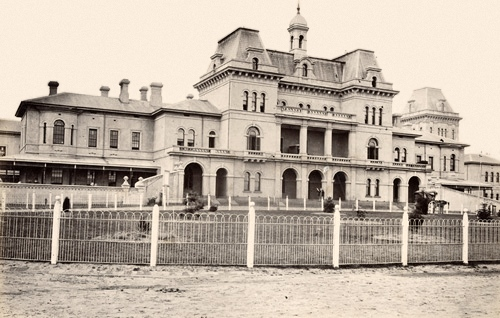
Kew Asylum, circa 1885–1887. Note the brick ha ha walls adjoining the front archways, enclosing one of the female courtyards.

During its 120 years of operation, Kew's title changed numerous times. This has been in response to society's changing views towards the treatment and care of mentally ill persons; improvements in treatment leading to better health outcomes and changes in the Victorian Government's various Health Acts. From its establishment until 1905 the institution at Kew was known as an asylum – a title which emphasised its function as a place of detention rather than a place where people could possibly be cured. Kew was also for a short period known as the Metropolitan Lunatic Asylum at Kew, possibly to differentiate it from its sister country asylums at Ararat and Beechworth. During this period, all people committed to the asylum were termed 'inmates' rather than patients – again emphasising detention rather than cure.

The Lunacy Act of 1903 changed the title of all Victorian "asylums" to "hospitals for the insane" however this Act didn't come into operation until March 1905. From this time onwards, inmates began being referred to as patients. The Mental Hygiene Act of 1933 again altered Kew's title to "Kew Mental Hospital". The move from 'asylum' to 'hospital' and 'inmate' to 'patient' also reflected the increased involvement of the medical profession in the management and treatment of mental illness.

After World War II there was a period of significant change in the treatment and prognosis for people with a mental illness. Drugs such as lithium carbonate (discovered in 1948 by Australian psychiatrist John Cade) and chlorpromazine (discovered in 1950s) lead to improvements in treatment. Thus many people with a mental illness could in many cases be treated in hospital for a shorter period and return to the community. The Mental Health Act of 1959 designated hospitals providing short-term diagnosis and accommodation as "psychiatric hospitals". Therefore, any institution could have a section designated as a mental hospital for long-term or indefinite hospitalisation and a section designated as a psychiatric hospital for short term diagnosis and treatment of acute psychiatric illness.

In 1962 the decision was made to no longer house acute or short-term patients at Kew and therefore it was formally proclaimed a Mental Hospital under the Mental Health Act of 1959. Up until this time, Kew Mental Hospital was still colloquially known as "Kew Asylum". In the 1960s Kew began to be known as "Willsmere", however some authors state the name change to "Willsmere" was later.

In January 1982 three wards of Kew Mental Hospital were proclaimed a Psychiatric Hospital under the provisions of the Mental Health Act 1959. These wards were then known as the Willsmere Unit and were established to receive and accommodate short-term acute patients.

== Shrinking grounds ==
When opened, Kew's extensive 398 acres (1.6 km^{2}; 0.6 sq mi) of grounds were intended to be used for farming, agriculture and recreation for the inmates. However, as treatment methods, inmate profiles, superintendents and societal factors changed, use of the grounds changed accordingly.

A large area of the grounds between the asylum main buildings and Princess Street was allocated to Children's Cottages in 1885. When the Children's Cottages became a separate institution, the area surrounding the cottages became no longer under asylum management and was no longer for asylum inmate use. Widening and straightening of Princess Street in 1939-1940 resulted in the demolishing of Kew's gatehouses, loss of land and the relocation of the main gates to Victoria Park, Kew. Construction of Yarra Boulevard during the 1930s led to a section of the asylum's river frontage being acquired by the roads department.

In 1958, 58 acres (0.2 km^{2}; 0.1 sq mi) of the northern section of the asylum grounds were offered under a Crown Grant to the Talbot Colony for Epileptics. Later known as Royal Talbot (now part of Austin Health), the hospital and training centre continue to operate on the site to this day. An area of Kew's grounds adjacent to the Talbot Colony was granted to the Guide Dogs, Victoria for the building of a guide dog breeding and training centre, which opened in 1962. The construction of the Eastern Freeway in the early 1970s also resulted in property loss for both Royal Talbot and Kew Asylum.

== Decommissioning and redevelopment ==
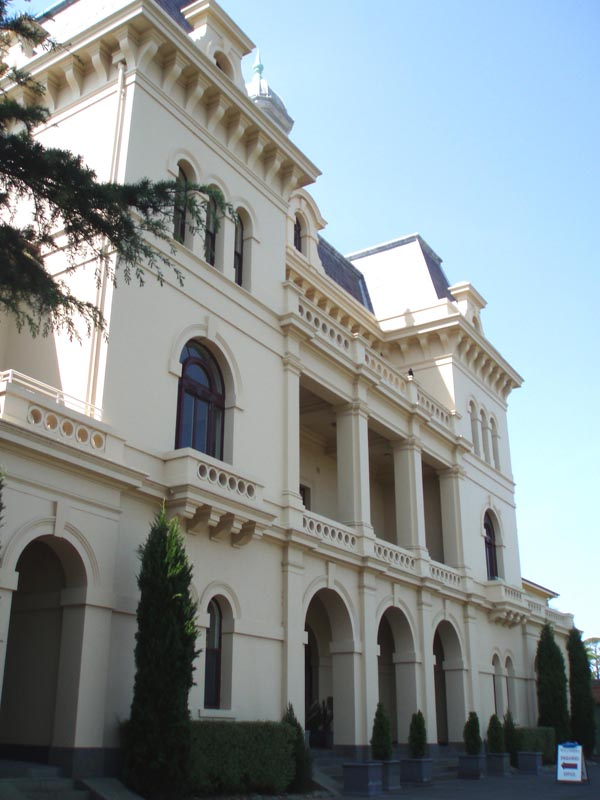
Willsmere Residential Development

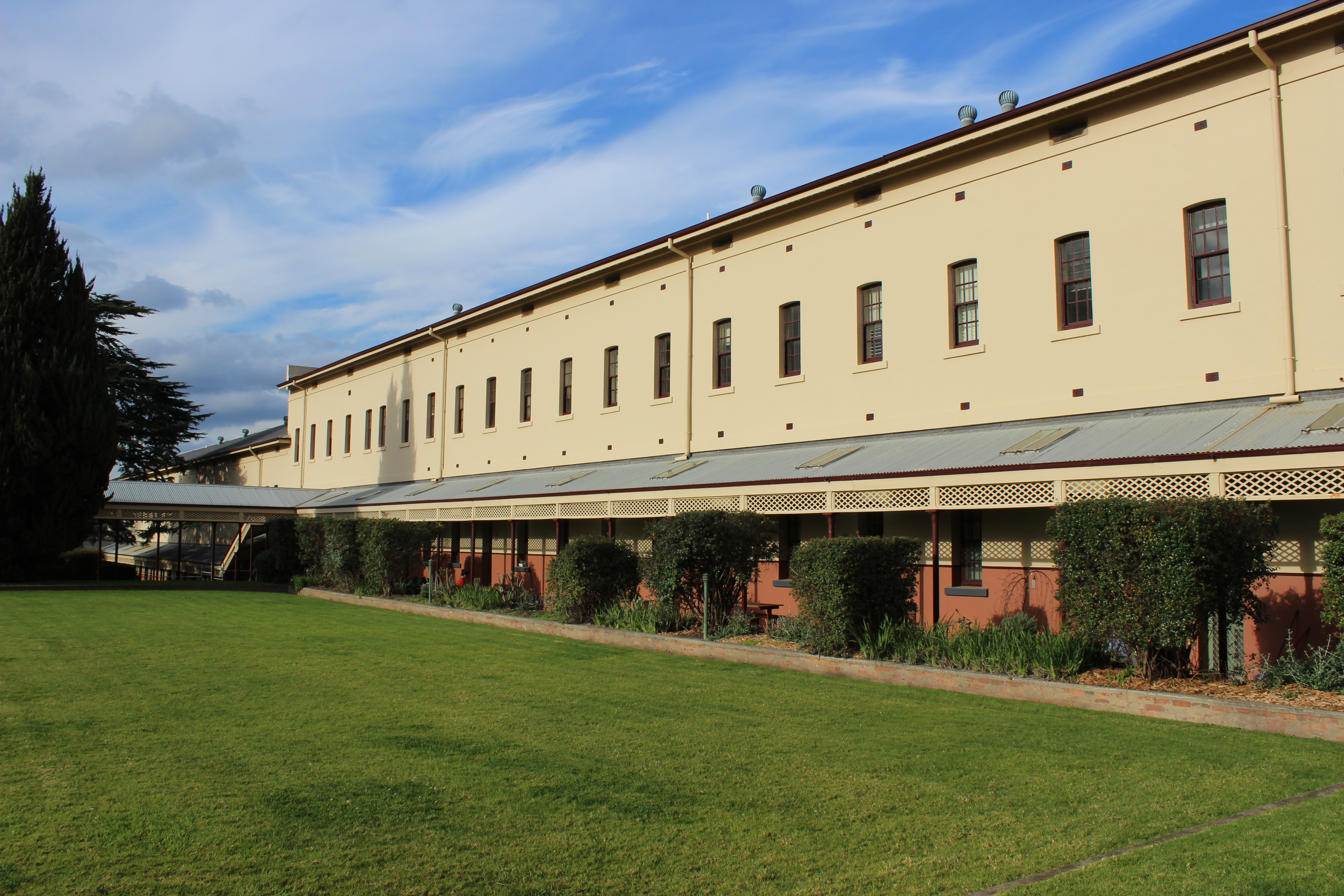
Former ward, now apartments, in July 2019

In June 1943 the town clerk of the City of Kew, W. D. Birrell, produced a report on the immediate post-war priorities for Kew. Birrell strongly urged the council to propose the closure of Kew Asylum, with the grounds to be subdivided and "...laid out on modern town planning principles with some 700 to 800 homes". According to Birrell, this would have been an ideal post-war scheme as it would provide employment and much needed land for housing. Birrell's proposal was not new; ever since the establishment of the asylum, proposals for its closure and redevelopment had recurred every few years. Birrell's plans did not eventuate as overcrowding at other mental hospitals throughout Victoria necessitated Kew's continued operation.

By 1986 Willsmere Hospital's bed numbers had been reduced to 430, three quarters of which were for psychogeriatric patients. As a result of ongoing mental health reform, the then Labor Government of Victoria commissioned the "Willsmere Project", the purpose of which was to plan for decommissioning the hospital and develop services and facilities in the community. Long-term psychogeriatric patients were transferred to new psychogeriatric nursing homes in the suburbs, to a re-opened ward of Plenty Psychiatric Hospital in Bundoora, to the refurbished Heatherton Tuberculosis Sanatorium or to other psychiatric institutions. Acutely unwell patients that would have previously been admitted to Willsmere were now sent to newly built units at Maroondah Hospital, Monash Medical Centre or Peninsula Hospital. Willsmere was finally closed in December 1988 and sold by the Government of Victoria in the late 1980s. An extensive conservation analysis was completed in 1988 that recommended the bulk of the original buildings be conserved.

The hospital complex was eventually developed by Central Equity into residential apartments. The Willsmere residential development was officially opened on 27 October 1993 by Premier Jeff Kennett.

The remaining grasslands between the Eastern Freeway and the main hospital buildings, including the site of the asylum's cricket field were developed as the Kew Gardens residential estate. The Kew Gardens project was completed in 1995. The buildings and grounds of the Kew Cottages (formerly the grounds of Kew Asylum) were redeveloped as the "Main Drive" project by Walker Corporation.

One of the conditions of the development permit from the Historic Buildings Council required that a section of the building be set aside and maintained as a museum that documented the history of the site. This led to the creation of an interpretive display in a section of the old "Female Paying Patients Ward", development of an archive and resource collection consisting of the few remaining records and artifacts left behind when Central Equity gained control of the site from AVJennings. The archive and resource collection was created by the Australian Science Archives Project (ASAP) at the University of Melbourne.

== Documented histories ==
There are few documented or published histories of Kew Asylum. The majority of information available on the asylum comes from the Kew's official records which are now held by the Public Record Office Victoria. Some of the early documents are open (or part open) to the public for viewing such as admission books, case notes, registers, and medical journals. However, the majority of documents dating from 1915 onwards are closed, due to the sensitive nature of the material they contain and the possibility that first degree relatives may still be alive.

A number of photographs of Kew Asylum are kept by the Victorian Mental Health Library at Royal Melbourne Hospital. The State Library of Victoria also holds a number of early photographs of Kew. The University of Melbourne has a small number of theses on Kew – the majority of which are short in length and are architecture-based. The exception to this is Cheryl Day's unpublished PhD thesis which is an ethnographic description of the first fifty years of Kew's existence. While the thesis was unpublished, it is available in PDF form through the University of Melbourne Library website.

Some contemporary accounts of life in Kew are available. Paul Ward Farmer wrote an essay "Three weeks in the Kew Lunatic Asylum", describing his admission to Kew in the 1890s. Julian Thomas, an American reporter, wrote a series of articles for The Argus in 1876–1877 under the pseudonym of "The Vagabond". Thomas was an attendant at Kew at the time. There are also excerpts of affidavits from patients, doctors, and attendants at Kew (as well as other Victorian mental hospitals such as Royal Park, Mont Park and Sunbury) detailing the terrible conditions in the asylums during the 1920s in the book A Plea for Better Treatment of the Mentally Afflicted by Hon. William G. Higgs.

== See also ==
- Yarra Bend Asylum
- Ararat Lunatic Asylum
- Beechworth Lunatic Asylum
- Kew Cottages
- List of Australian psychiatric institutions
