= Lakeside Mental Hospital =

Former hospital in Victoria, Australia

Coordinates: 37.55111°S 143.81760°E

Geography
- Location: Wendouree, Victoria, Australia

Organisation
- Care system: Public
- Type: Psychiatric

Services
- Beds: 900+

History
- Opened: 1877
- Closed: 1996

Links
- Lists: Hospitals in Australia
- Other links: List of Australian psychiatric institutions

Lakeside Mental Hospital, originally known as Ballarat Asylum, later as Ballarat Hospital for the Insane and finally, before its closure, as Lakeside Psychiatric Hospital, was an Australian psychiatric hospital located in the suburb of Wendouree, the north-western fringe of Ballarat, Victoria, Australia.

The hospital first opened in 1877 for the "imbecile and idiot" (low intellect) class of patient rather than patients with acute insanity. It closed again soon after. A reformatory for boys also operated on the site, and some of its buildings were reused when the hospital was reopened in 1893, specialising in the treatment of epileptics. A brick building was converted into a ward to house 30 male patients. This was extensively damaged in a fire in 1917. A report in 1895 said that the patients did not have enough warm clothing, and that they were shivering during the cold Ballarat winter. Proposals to expand the asylum were mooted in 1909. Large scale extension and alteration were put forward by the state government in 1916.

In 1934, the Ballarat Asylum was renamed Ballarat Mental Hospital and, in 1969, the name changed again to Lakeside Hospital. Lakeside Hospital was decommissioned in 1996.

The hospital at its peak employed about 600 staff and could hold 1500 patients. The site was 83 hectares, of which 40 hectares was used as a farm. Crops planted in 1910 included leeks, cauliflowers, onions, rhubarb, potatoes, pumpkins, carrots, tomatoes, celery, beetroot, peas, beans and parsnips. In 1907, a Dr. Cherry reported that the patients helped to compress green fodder crops for storage by dancing jigs and reels on them to the accompaniment of a fiddle.

The site is now used for the Ballarat Aquatic Centre, a number of sporting facilities, and the Lake Gardens housing estate. Some original building are still standing and have been renovated and reused.

== Incidents ==
An outbuilding burned down in 1898. In 1909, an incident between inmates resulted in the death of one by pick-axe. In 1917, a large fire destroyed one of the wings which was formerly the boys reformatory school. A patient committed suicide by drowning himself in Lake Wendouree in 1995 after it was announced by the Government that deinstitution would begin. The man was a long term patient. His disappearance was reported to the police, when staff took a group on a walk around the nearby lake. He was later found by a Lakeside nurse.

== See also ==
- List of Australian psychiatric institutions
