= Beechworth Asylum =

Former hospital in Victoria, Australia

Coordinates: 36.36918°S 146.69642°E

Beechworth Lunatic Asylum
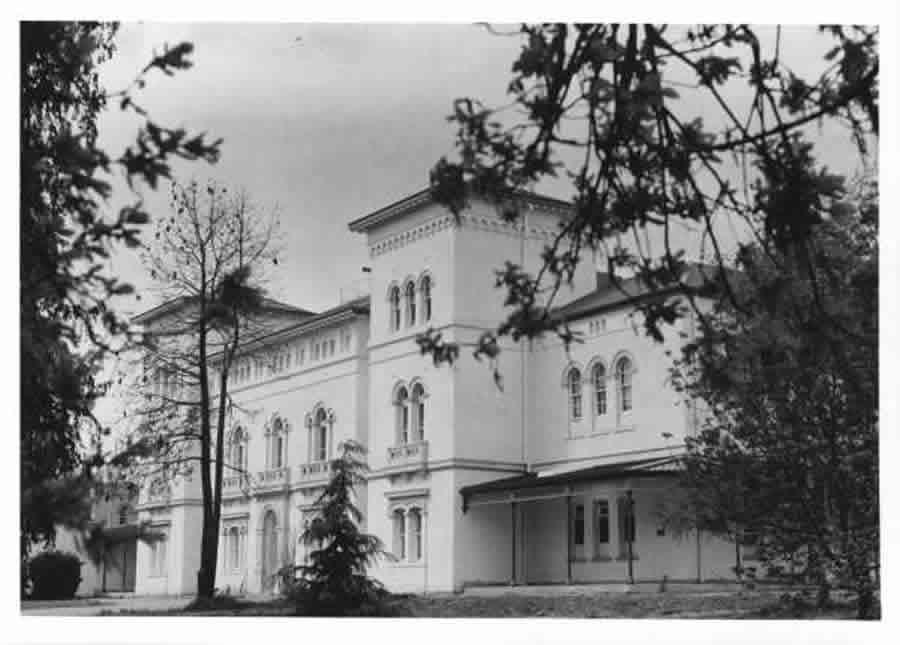
- Beechworth Asylum. Photo by John T Collins circa 1950

Geography
- Location: Beechworth, Victoria, Australia

Organisation
- Type: Specialist

Services
- Beds: 1200
- Speciality: Psychiatric

History
- Founded: 1867
- Closed: 1995

Links
- Other links: List of Australian psychiatric institutions

Beechworth Asylum, also known in later years as the Beechworth Hospital for the Insane and Mayday Hills Mental Hospital, is a decommissioned hospital located in Beechworth, a town of Victoria, Australia. Mayday Hills Lunatic Asylum was the second such hospital to be built in Victoria, being one of the three largest. Mayday Hills Hospital closed in 1995, following 128 years of operation.

The asylum was surrounded by almost 106 hectares (260 acres) of farmland, making the hospital self-sufficient with its own piggery, orchards, kitchen gardens, fields, stables and barn. For recreation, the asylum included tennis courts, an oval and cricket pavilion, a kiosk and a theatre.

== Ha-ha walls ==
One of the distinctive features of both Kew Asylum and Beechworth Asylum is the use of a variation on ha-ha walls around the patients courtyards. These ha-has consisted of a trench, one side of which was vertical and faced with stone or bricks, the other side sloped and turfed. From the inside, the walls presented a tall face to patients, preventing them from escaping, while from outside, the walls looked low so as not to suggest imprisonment.

== Admission process ==
People could be admitted to the asylum as a lunatic patient by a number of means:

- At the request of a friend, relative or acquaintance, with medical certificates written by two medical practitioners. This method was amended by The Mental Health Act 1959 which stated a person could be admitted upon the recommendation of a medical practitioner who had examined the person. As soon as possible after admission the superintendent of the hospital was required to examine the patient and either approve the recommended admission or discharge the patient.
- Any (lunatic) person found wandering at large or not under proper care and control could be brought before two justices who could order the person's removal to an asylum. The police were usually responsible for bringing the person before the two justices.
- Any prisoner of the Crown thought to be a lunatic could be removed from a jail to an asylum by order of the Chief Secretary.
- Voluntary admissions were those who requested that they be admitted for a mutually agreed period of time (from 1915 onwards).

For a short period in the hospital's history, to be admitted, only two signatures were required. To be discharged, eight signatures were required, thus it was a lot harder to get out than to get in.

== Current uses ==
Beechworth Lunatic Asylum was formerly owned by La Trobe University. La Trobe sold the facility in 2013 to a local company composed of two Beechworth businessmen, George Fendyke and Geoff Lucas. The site is now being subdivided and either leased or sold to tourism and arts-based businesses.

Tours currently run through the facility to preserve and showcase the history and architecture. The gardens date to the 19th century, covering 11 hectares, and are open to the public from dawn until dusk.

A venue used for weddings is the Chapel of the Resurrection, to the west of the site. It was built in 1868 as the mortuary for the complex, and was converted to the chapel seen today in the 1960s.

== Gallery ==
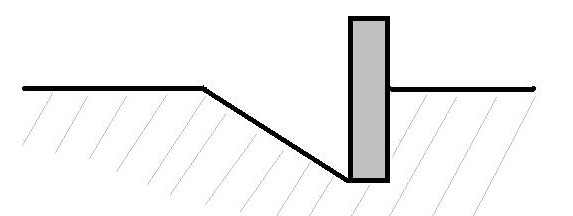
Diagram of a ha-ha wall

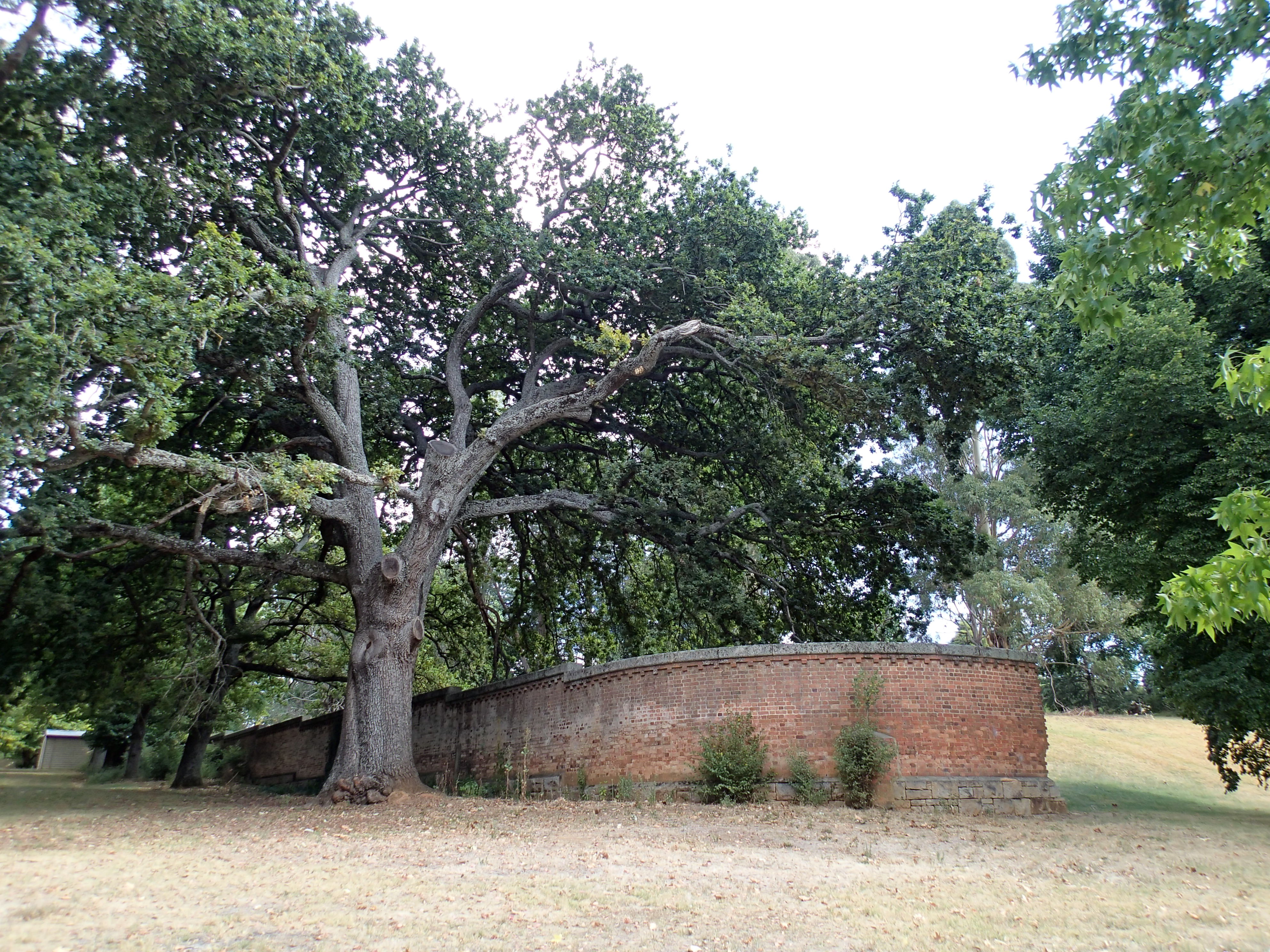
Remains of the original ha-ha wall, from the 'outside' of the original asylum boundary

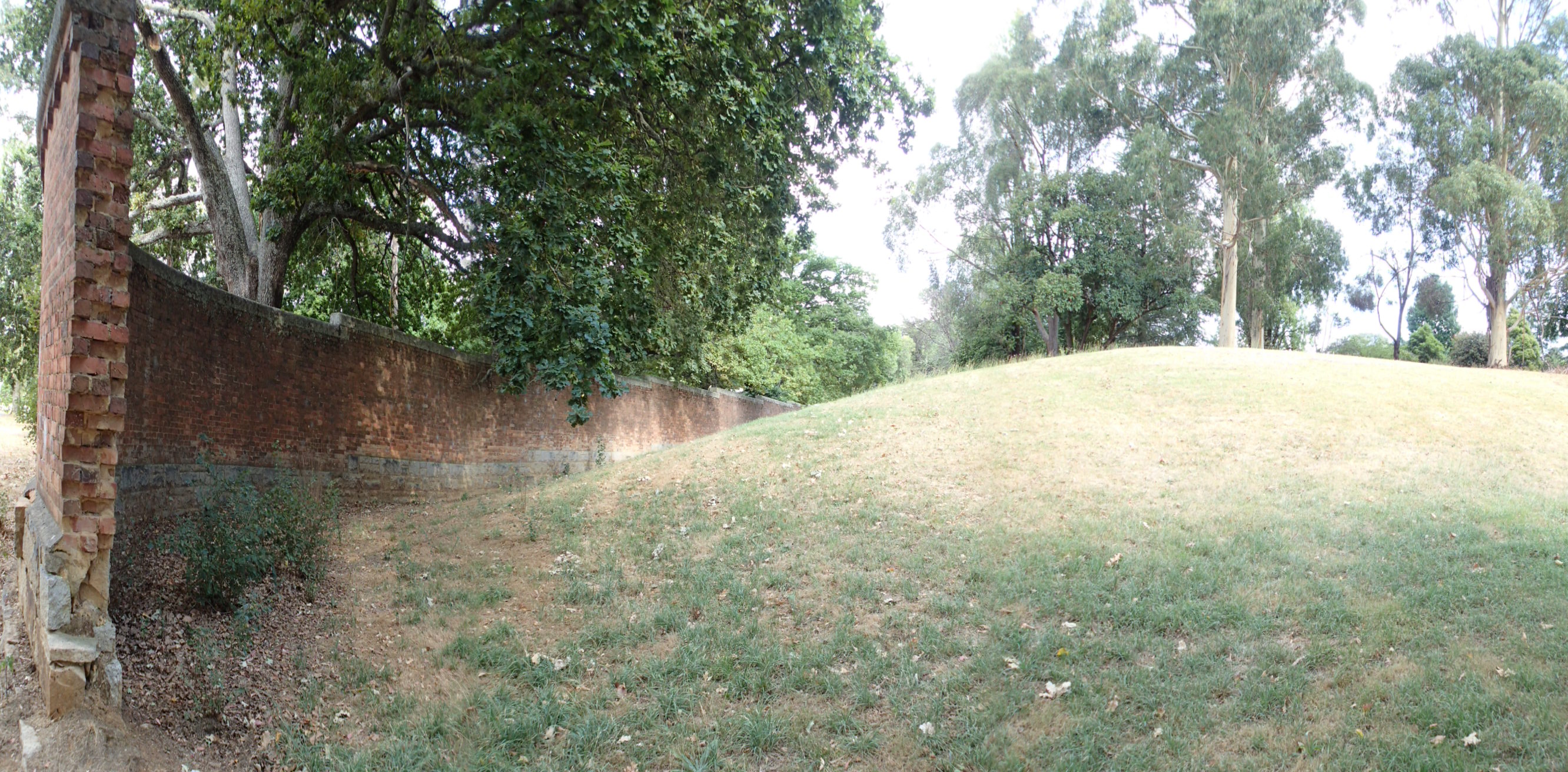
Photo at the beginning of the remains of the ha-ha at Beechworth Asylum, from the inside of the wall, showing the sloping trench

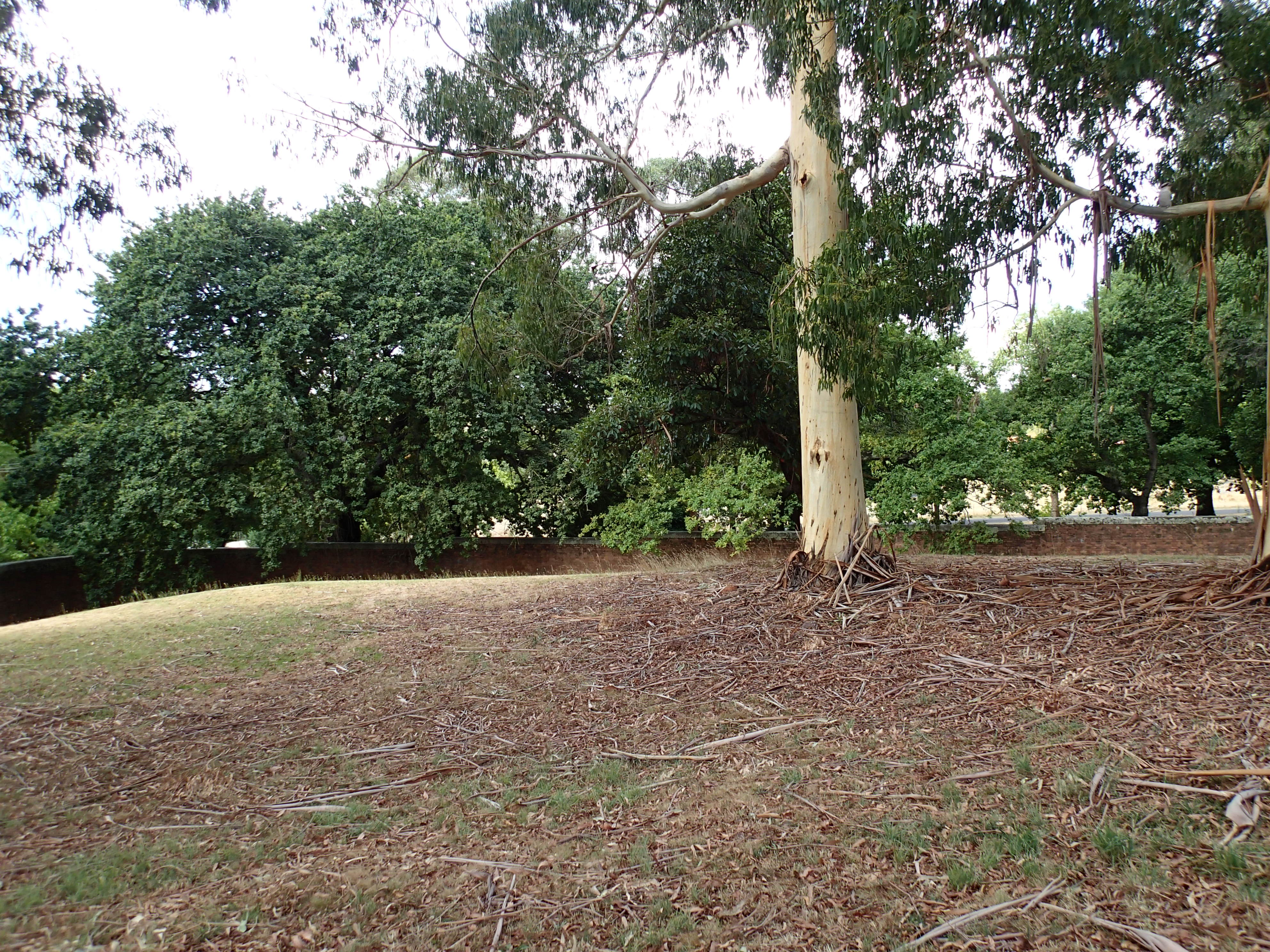
Photograph from the top of the trench at the Beechworth Asylum, showing how the ha-ha wall appears much lower here than it really is

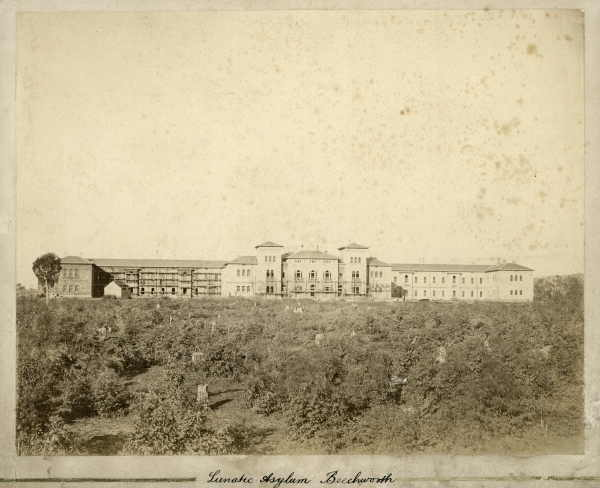
Beechworth Asylum ca. 1867

== See also ==
- List of Australian psychiatric institutions
- Aradale Mental Hospital
- Kew Asylum
