= List of prison deaths =

This is a list of notable people who have died in prison, whether in prison or in hospital while still serving a prison sentence. This list does not include inmates who were executed as punishment for their crimes.

== Pre-11th century ==
Name	Date of death	Nationality	Cause of death	Known for	Comments
Rim-Sîn I	After 1764 BC	Larsa	Unknown	Ruler of Larsa	
Vercingetorix	during 46 BC	Gaul (detained by the Roman Republic)	Strangulation	Gaulish leader defeated by Julius Caesar	
Gaius Asinius Gallus	33	Roman Empire	Starvation	Roman senator	
Alexander of Jerusalem	251	Roman Empire	Unknown	Martyr and saint	
Mani	274-03-02 or 277-02-26	Sasanian Empire	Unknown	Prophet and founder of Manichaeism	Manichaeans later depicted his death as a crucifixion in analogy to the crucifixion of Jesus.
Hilderic	530	Vandal Kingdom	Murder	King of the Vandals and Alans	
Al-Abbas ibn al-Walid	750	Umayyad Caliphate	Unknown disease	Prince and general	
Abu Hanifa	767-08-15	Abbasid Caliphate	Unknown	Founder of the Hanafi school of Islamic jurisprudence	His tomb was destroyed by Shah Ismail of the Safavid Empire in 1508, but rebuilt by the Ottomans in 1533.
Itakh	849	Abbasid Caliphate	Thirst	Commander in the Turkic army of the Abbasid Caliphate	
Tughj ibn Juff	906	Abbasid Caliphate	Unknown	Turkic military officer	
Muhammad ibn Yaqut	935	Abbasid Caliphate	Unknown	Official of the Abbasid Caliphate	

== 11th to 15th century ==
Name	Date of death	Nationality	Cause of death	Known for	Comments
Abd al-Rahim ibn Ilyas	1021	Fatimid Caliphate	Suicide	Heir-apparent of the caliph al-Hakim bi-Amr Allah	According to the official account, he committed suicide by thrusting a fruit knife into his belly, but coeval rumours insisted that he was assassinated.
Robert Curthose	1134	House of Normandy	Unknown	Duke of Normandy, eldest son of William the Conqueror	Imprisoned by his younger brother Henry I of England.
Ibn Barrajan	1141	Almoravid dynasty	Unknown	Arab Sufi figure of Al-Andalus	
Joscelin II, Count of Edessa	1159	County of Edessa (detained by the Zengid State)	Unknown	Last ruling count of Edessa	
Daoud ibn al-Adid	1207/08	Ayyubid dynasty	Unknown	25th imam of Hafizi Isma'ilism	
Peter II of Courtenay	1219	Latin Empire	Unknown	Latin Emperor	
Eleanor, Fair Maid of Brittany	1241-08-10	House of Plantagenet	Unknown	Princess and potential heiress to her house as granddaughter of Henry II of England	Imprisoned by her uncle King John of England and cousin Henry III of England to prevent her potential claim, without trial or sentence. Unbelievably rumored to be starved by John.
Sulayman ibn Daoud	1248	Ayyubid dynasty	Unknown	26th and last imam of Hafizi Isma'ilism	
Guy de Montfort, Count of Nola	1291	England (detained by Aragon)	Unknown	Son of Simon de Montfort, 6th Earl of Leicester	
Sayf al-Din Salar	October 1310	Mamluk Sultanate	Starvation	Viceroy of the Mamluk sultan al-Nasir Muhammad	
Margaret of Villehardouin	February/March 1315	Barony of Akova	Unknown	Baroness of two thirds of Akova	
Pietro d'Abano	1315	Abano Bagni (detained by the Papal States)	Unknown	Philosopher, astrologer	
Ibn Taymiyya	1328-09-26	Mamluk Sultanate	Unknown illness	Sunni Muslim ʿālim, muhaddith, judge, proto-Salafist theologian, ascetic, and iconoclastic theologian	
Kęstutis	August 1382	Grand Duchy of Lithuania	Unknown, presumably strangled	Grand Duke of Lithuania, father of Vytautas, uncle of Jogaila	Jogaila claimed that his death was suicide by hanging. Most coeval sources conjecture that Kęstutis was strangled on Jogaila's orders.
Nicolò Guarco	c. 1385	Republic of Genoa	Unknown	7th doge of the Republic of Genoa	
Dionysius, Metropolitan of Kiev	1385-10-15	Principality of Moscow	Unknown	Russian Orthodox metropolitan	
Guido III da Polenta	1389	Ravenna	Unknown	Lord of Ravenna, member of the Da Polenta family	Imprisoned by his sons.
Thomas of Woodstock, Duke of Gloucester	1397-09-08/09	England	Murder	Youngest child of King Edward III of England	
Eleanor, Duchess of Gloucester	1452-07-07	England	Unknown	English noblewoman, second wife of Humphrey, Duke of Gloucester	Sentenced to life imprisonment for treasonable necromancy. Her imprisonment and forced divorce was likely politically motivated.
Pak P'aengnyŏn	1456-06-07	Joseon	Torture	Scholar-official, one of the six martyred ministers, uncle of Queen Janggyeong	All the males in his family were executed and females were enslaved.
Henry VI of England	1471-05-21	England	Probably murder	Last King of England of the House of Plantagenet and disputed King of France	

== 16th century ==
Name	Date of death	Nationality	Cause of death	Known for	Comments
Dmitry Ivanovich	1509-02-14	Grand Principality of Moscow	Unknown	Grand Prince of Moscow (co-ruler), grandson of Ivan III	
Pietro Torrigiano	August 1528	Florence (detained by Spain)	Natural causes	Italian Renaissance sculptor	
Yury Ivanovich	1536-08-03	Grand Principality of Moscow	Starvation	Son of Ivan III	
Andrey of Staritsa	1537-12-11	Grand Principality of Moscow	Unknown	Youngest son of Ivan III	
Girolamo Zane	1572-10-13	Republic of Venice	Natural causes	Capitano Generale da Mar of the Venetian fleet	
Eric XIV of Sweden	1577-02-26	Sweden	Arsenic poisoning	King of Sweden, brother of John III of Sweden	
James Hepburn, 4th Earl of Bothwell	1578-04-14	Scotland (detained by Denmark)	Unknown	King consort of Scotland in 1567	
Ferenc Dávid	1579-04-14	Principality of Transylvania	Natural causes	Protestant preacher and theologian, founder of the Unitarian Church of Transylvania	
Philip Howard, 13th Earl of Arundel	1595-10-19	England	Dysentery	Imprisoned in the Tower of London as a Roman Catholic recusant by Elizabeth I of England. Acclaimed a martyr almost immediately and canonised in 1970 as one of the Forty Martyrs of England and Wales.	

== 17th century ==
Name	Date of death	Nationality	Cause of death	Known for	Comments
Li Zhi	1602	China	Suicide by cutting his throat	Philosopher, historian, writer	
Simon I of Kartli	1611	Kingdom of Kartli (detained by the Ottoman Empire)	Unknown	King of Kartli	
Vasili IV of Russia	1612-09-12	Russia (detained by Poland-Lithuania)	Unknown	Tsar of Russia	
Cesare Corte	1613	Republic of Genoa	Unknown	Renaissance painter	
Marina Mniszech	1614-12-24	Russia	Unknown	Tsaritsa, wife of False Dmitry I and False Dmitry II	
Husayn Pasha	1663	Ottoman Empire	Murder	Governor of Gaza Sanjak	
Marcy Clay	1665	England	Suicide by poisoning	English thief and highwayrobber	Sentenced to death by hanging
Hardress Waller	1666-07-30	England	Unknown	Member of Parliament, regicide of King Charles I of England	
Gilbert Millington	1666	England	Unknown	Barrister, regicide of King Charles I of England	
Henry Smith	1668	England	Unknown	Member of Parliament, regicide of King Charles I of England	
James Temple	1680-02-17	England	Unknown	Soldier, regicide of King Charles I of England	
Sarah Osborne	1692-05-10	Massachusetts Bay	Unknown	One of the first women to be accused of witchcraft in the Salem witch trials	
Giuseppe Francesco Borri	1695-08-20	Duchy of Milan (detained by the Papal States)	Malaria	Alchemist, freethinker, physician	

== 18th century ==
Name	Date of death	Nationality	Cause of death	Known for	Comments
Bartholomew Sharp	1702-10-29	England (detained by the Danish West Indies)	Unknown	Buccaneer and privateer	
Man in the Iron Mask	1703-11-19	France	Unknown	Mysterious prisoner kept in a solitary cell	
Giovanni Battista Sidotti	1714-11-27	Sicily (detained by the Tokugawa shogunate)	Unknown	Priest, missionary of the Propaganda Fide	
Alexei Petrovich, Tsarevich of Russia	1718-06-26	Russian Empire	Unknown	Tsarevich	Died two days after the senate had condemned him to death.
Mary Read	1721-04-08	Great Britain (detained by the Colony of Jamaica)	Fever	Pirate	Originally sentenced to hang, she claimed to be pregnant and received a temporary stay of execution.
Aaron Margalita	c. 1725	Poland (detained by Denmark)	Unknown	Rabbi who later converted to Calvinism and Lutheranism	
Dmitry Mikhailovich Golitsyn the Elder	1737-04-14	Russian Empire	Natural causes	Aristocrat of the Golitsyn family, attempted to turn Russia into a constitutional monarchy	
Robert Blackbourn	1748	Great Britain	Unknown	Jacobite conspirator	Arrested for his involvement in an assassination plot of 1696
Stepan Fyodorovich Apraksin	1758-08-17	Russian Empire	Unknown	Commander during the Seven Years' War	
Ivan VI	1764-	Russian Empire	Assassination	Emperor of Russia	
Duke Anthony Ulrich of Brunswick	1774-05-04	Brunswick-Wolfenbüttel (detained by Russian Empire)	Unknown	Prince and military officer	
Tarakanova	1775-12-15	Russian Empire	Tuberculosis	Pretender to the Russian throne	
Lord George Gordon	1793-11-01	Great Britain	Typhoid fever	British politician	
Louis XVII	1795-06-08	France	Scrofula	Dauphin of France	
Franz Gotthardi	1795	Holy Roman Empire	Unknown	Hungarian-born businessman and senior police officer	
Wolfe Tone	1798-11-19	Ireland (detained by Great Britain)	Suicide	Leader of the 1798 Irish Rebellion against Great Britain	Sentenced to death by hanging; committed suicide because he wanted to die by firing squad (a soldier's death, rather than a criminal's) instead.

== 19th century ==
Name	Date of death	Nationality	Cause of death	Known for	Comments
Darya Nikolayevna Saltykova	1801-12-09	Russian Empire	Natural causes	Noblewoman from the Saltykov family, serial killer	
Toussaint Louverture	1804-04-07	Haiti (detained by France)	Natural causes	Leader of the Haitian Revolution who was imprisoned for launching a rebellion against France	
Erminio Criscione	1807-12-07	Republic of Haiti	Suicide or killed by Alexandre Pétion	Haitian Independence hero	
Wazir Ali Khan	1817-05-15	Oudh State (detained by British India)	Unknown	Nawab of Oudh	Imprisoned for leading the Massacre of Benares.
Pedro Carujo	1836-01-31	Venezuela	Battle wounds	Military officer, one of the leaders in the Revolution of the Reforms	
Solomon Dodashvili	1836-08-20	Russian Empire	Tuberculosis	Georgian philosopher, journalist, historian, grammarian, belletrist and enlightener	
Anthony Van Egmond	1838-01-05	Netherlands (detained by Upper Canada)	Pneumonia, malnutrition and exposure	Dutch war veteran and an early settler in the Huron Tract	
Osceola	1838-01-30	Seminole (detained by the United States)	Peritonsillar abscess caused by tonsillitis	Leader of the Seminole	
Wilhelm Küchelbecker	1846-08-23	Russian Empire	Tuberculosis	Romantic poet, Decembrist revolutionary	
Mullá ʻAlíy-i-Bastámí	1846	Qajar Iran (detained by the Ottoman Empire)	Unknown	2nd Letter of the Living in the Bábí movement	
Rrapo Hekali	December 1847	Ottoman Empire	Unknown	Albanian revolutionary	
Ion Negulici	1851-04-05	Wallachia	Tuberculosis	Painter, participant in the Wallachian Revolution of 1848	
Chui A-poo	1851	British Hong Kong	Suicide by hanging	Pirate	One of the two most notorious South China Sea pirates of the era
Matilde Malenchini	1858-09-08	Grand Duchy of Tuscany	Unknown	Academic painter	Accused of pushing one of her maids out of a window when the maid was caught stealing.
Dimitar Miladinov	January 1862	Ottoman Empire	Typhus	Bulgarian poet, folklorist, and activist	
Konstantin Miladinov	January 1862	Ottoman Empire	Typhus	Bulgarian poet, folklorist, and activist	
James Henry Gooding	1864-07-19	United States (detained by the Confederate States)	Unknown	Corporal in the 54th Massachusetts Infantry Regiment	
Lorenzo Denning	1865-02-08	United States (detained by the Confederate States)	Unknown	Soldier, awarded with the Medal of Honor	
Walerian Łukasiński	1868-01-27	Russian Empire	Natural causes	Polish officer and political activist, symbol of the Polish struggle for independence	
Stanislav Dospevski	1878-01-06	Ottoman Empire	Unknown	Bulgarian painter, nephew of Zahari Zograf	
Sándor Rózsa	1878-11-22	Austria-Hungary	Tuberculosis	Outlaw, best-known Hungarian highwayman	
Grigory Goldenberg	July 1880	Russian Empire	Suicide	Revolutionary, member of Narodnaya Volya	
Hesya Helfman	1882-02-01	Russian Empire	Peritonitis	Belarusian-Jewish revolutionary, member of Narodnaya Volya	
Nikolai Kletochnikov	1883-07-13	Russian Empire	Hunger strike	Revolutionary, joined the police to act as a source of inside information	
Alexander Dmitrievich Mikhailov	1884-03-30	Russian Empire	Unknown	Revolutionary, one of the founders of Zemlya i Volya and Narodnaya Volya	
Alexander Dolgushin	1885-06-30	Russian Empire	Tuberculosis	Populist	
Maria Kutitonskaya	1887-05-04	Russian Empire	Tuberculosis	Ukrainian Narodnik revolutionary, attempted to assassinate the military governor Luka Illyashevich	
Aizik Aronchik	1888-04-02	Russian Empire	Unknown	Russian revolutionary, attempted to assassinate Tsar Alexander II	
Maria Kalyuzhnaya	1889-11-07	Russian Empire	Suicide by poisoning	Ukrainian Narodnik revolutionary	
Nadia Smyrnytska	1889-11-07	Russian Empire	Suicide by poisoning	Ukrainian Narodnik revolutionary	
Nadezhda Sigida	1889-11-08	Russian Empire	Suicide by poisoning	Revolutionary	
Maria Kovalevska	1889-11-19	Russian Empire	Suicide by poisoning	Ukrainian Narodnik revolutionary	
Mariia Vetrova	1897-02-24	Russian Empire	Self-immolation	Ukrainian teacher and revolutionary	
Dervish Cara	Late 19th century	Ottoman Empire	Unknown	Albanian revolutionary leader	

== 1900–1939 ==
Name	Date of death	Nationality	Cause of death	Known for	Comments
Gaetano Bresci	1901-05-22	Italy	Suicide by hanging	Anarchist, assassinated King Umberto I of Italy	
Nikola Aslanov	1905-09-24	Ottoman Empire	Unknown	Bulgarian revolutionary, worker of the IMARO	
Marko Boshnakov	1908-02-15	Ottoman Empire	Unknown	Bulgarian anarchist, member of the Gemidziite	
Milan Arsov	1908-06-08	Ottoman Empire	Unknown	Bulgarian anarchist, member of the Gemidziite	
Muhammad al-Kattani	1909-05-04	Morocco	Died after being mutilated and beaten	Sufi faqih	
Giovanni Passannante	1910-02-14	Italy	Unknown	Anarchist, attempted to assassinate King Umberto I of Italy	
Luigi Lucheni	1910-10-19	Italy (detained by Switzerland)	Suicide by hanging	Anarchist, assassinated Empress Elisabeth of Austria	
Igor Sazonov	1910-12-10	Russian Empire	Suicide by poisoning or self-immolation	Revolutionary, member of the SR Combat Organization	
Hristo Batandzhiev	1913-07-18	Greece	Murder	Macedonian Bulgarian revolutionary, one of the founders of the Internal Macedonian Revolutionary Organization	
Dmytro Yaremko	1916-10-03	Russian Empire	Unknown	Ukrainian Catholic Archeparchy of Lviv and titular bishop of Ostroh	
Nikolay Radkevich	Autumn 1916	Russian Empire	Killed by fellow inmates	Serial killer	
Gennaro Rubino	1918-03-14	Italy (detained by Belgium)	Unknown	Anarchist, tried to assassinate King Leopold II of Belgium	
Frans Koskinen	1918-04-26	Finland	Unknown	Journalist and politician	Imprisoned for having sided with the Reds during the Finnish Civil War.
Gavrilo Princip	1918-04-28	Austria-Hungary	Malnutrition and skeletal tuberculosis	Serbian assassin	Assassinated Archduke Franz Ferdinand, beginning World War I
Efraim Kronqvist	1918-05-22	Finland	Unknown	House painter and politician	Imprisoned for having sided with the Reds during the Finnish Civil War.
Albin Valjakka	1918-06-29	Finland	Unknown	Journalist and politician	Imprisoned for having sided with the Reds during the Finnish Civil War.
Julius Nurminen	1918-07-24	Finland	Unknown	Journalist and politician	Imprisoned for having sided with the Reds during the Finnish Civil War.
Pavel Spiridonovich Medvedev	1919-03-12	Soviet Union	Typhus	Bolshevik revolutionary, participant in the execution of the Romanov family	
Jussi Kujala	1919-07-01	Finland	Suicide	Journalist and former member of the Parliament of Finland	
Gaki Sherocho	1919	Kingdom of Kaffa (detained by Ethiopia)	Unknown	Last King of Kaffa	
Aleksandr Vladimirovich Razvozov	1920-06-14	Soviet Union	Infection after an appendectomy	Rear admiral, first commander of the Soviet Baltic Fleet	
Ivan Kalmykov	September 1920	Soviet Union (detained by China)	Shot during an escape attempt	Ataman of the Ussuri Cossacks	
Michael Fitzgerald	1920-10-17	United Kingdom	Hunger strike	Officer Commanding of the Irish Republican Army	
Terence MacSwiney	1920-10-25	United Kingdom	Hunger strike	Irish playwright, author and politician, Lord Mayor of Cork	
Joe Murphy	1920-10-25	United Kingdom	Hunger strike	Officer in the Irish Republican Army	
Joseph Whitty	1923-08-02	Irish Free State	Hunger strike	Volunteer in the Irish Republican Army	
Denny Barry	1923-08-02	Irish Free State	Hunger strike	Irish Republican	
Yrjö Mäkelin	1923-09-18	Finland	Suicide	Socialist, journalist and former member of parliament	
Andy O'Sullivan	1923-11-22	Irish Free State	Hunger strike	Intelligence Officer and regional leader in the Irish Republican Army	
Krishna Lal Adhikari	1923-12-09	Nepal	Tuberculosis	Author of the now lost work Makaiko Kheti	
Leung Ying	1928-10-22	China (detained by the United States)	Suicide by hanging	Mass murderer	The worst case of mass murder in California history at the time
Dagmar Overbye	1929-05-06	Denmark	Unknown	Serial killer	
Uļi Kīnkamäg	1932-06-01	Latvia	Unknown	Livonian nationalist, "King of Livs"	
Jesse Pomeroy	1932-09-29	United States	Natural causes	Child murderer	Youngest person in the history of Massachusetts to be convicted of murder in the first degree.
Ajvaagiin Danzan	1932	Mongolia	Unknown	Chairman of the MPRP	
Richard Loeb	1936-01-28	United States	Murdered by fellow inmate	American murderer	
Zmicier Zhylunovich	1937-04-11	Soviet Union	Suicide	Belarusian Poet, journalist and political leader	Arrested during the Great Purge as an "enemy of the Belarusian people"
Antonio Gramsci	1937-04-27	Italy	combination of arteriosclerosis, pulmonary tuberculosis, high blood pressure, angina, gout and acute gastric disorders	Marxist philosopher, linguist, journalist, writer, and politician	Arrested by the OVRA

== 1940s ==
Name	Date of death	Nationality	Cause of death	Known for	Comments
Albert Richter	1940-01-02	Germany	Unknown	Cyclist and World amateur sprint champion	His death was successively ruled as a skii accident, being beaten by rival smugglers, suicide by hanging, suicide by shooting and having fallen at the Eastern Front. Richter was presumably killed by the Gestapo.
Tony D'Arcy	1940-04-16	Ireland	Hunger strike	Senior leader in the Irish Republican Army	
Jack McNeela	1940-04-19	Ireland	Hunger strike	Officer Commanding of all IRA forces in England	
Walter Kraemer	1941-11-16	Germany	Murder	Politician of the KPD and member of the resistance against Nazism	Became known as the "Doctor of Buchenwald" for medically helping other prisoners.
Daniil Kharms	1942-02-02	Soviet Union	Starvation	Avant-gardist and absurdist poet, writer and dramatist	Arrested as a member of "a group of anti-Soviet children's writers". He was later exonerated in 1960.
Heinz Hitler	1942-02-21	Germany (detained by the Soviet Union)	Unknown	Half-nephew of Adolf Hitler and half-brother of William Stuart-Houston	Died at the age of 21 in the Butyrka prison in Moscow.
Prince Amedeo, Duke of Aosta	1942-03-03	Italy (detained by the United Kingdom)	Tuberculosis, malaria	Duke of Aosta, Viceroy of Italian East Africa	
Miguel Hernández	1942-03-28	Spain	Tuberculosis	Poet and playwright	
Ernst Heilborn	1942-05-16	Germany	Unknown	Writer, critic and journalist	
Francesco Fantin	1942-11-16	Italy (detained by Australia)	Injuries caused by the attack of another inmate	Anti-fascist activist	Detained in Loveday Camp 14 because he was mistaken for a fascist.
Jan Ankerman	1942-12-27	Netherlands (detained by Japan)	Unknown	Field hockey player, won the Silver medal at the 1928 Summer Olympics	
Nikolai Vavilov	1943-01-26	Soviet Union	Malnutrition	Russian botanist and geneticist who was imprisoned for his attempts to oppose pseudoscience	
Yakov Dzhugashvili	1943-04-14	Soviet Union (detained by Germany)	Unknown	Eldest son of Joseph Stalin	Died at Sachsenhausen concentration camp, Stalin refused a prisoner exchange between him and Heinz Hitler.
Ru van der Haar	1943-05-15	Netherlands (detained by Japan)	Unknown	Field hockey player, won the Bronze medal at the 1936 Summer Olympics	
Hans Fokker	1943-07-02	Netherlands (detained by Japan)	Tropical disease	Sailor, participant in the 1928 Summer Olympics	
Vito Cascio Ferro	1943-09-20	Italy	Natural causes or bombing of his prison	Mafioso of the Sicilian Mafia	
Albert Love	1943-11-08	United Kingdom (detained by Japan)	Unknown	Welsh boxer, competed for England in the 1930 British Empire Games	
Umberto di Giorgio	1943-11-30	Italy (detained by Germany)	Heart attack	Lieutenant general, in charge of the territorial defense of Rome	
Kasturba Gandhi	1944-02-22	India	Natural causes	Indian political activist and the wife of Mahatma Gandhi	Imprisoned in a detention camp in Pune for protesting and participating in the Quit India Movement.
Armellini Chiappi	1944-11-04	Italy (detained by Germany)	Illness	Lieutenant general, in charge of the territorial defense of Florence	
Ralph Shields	1944-11-21	United Kingdom (detained by Japan)	Malnutrition, beriberi	Footballer	
Rodolfo Torresan	1944-11-22	Italy (detained by Germany)	Illness	Major general, served in four wars	
Johannes van der Vegte	1945-03-15	Netherlands (detained by Japan)	Unknown	Rower, participant in the 1920 Summer Olympics	
Ettore Deltetto	1945-04-18	Italy	Gastrointestinal perforation	Major general	Was sentenced to 20 years for "abandonment of command" on 24 December 1944. The sentenced was overturned two years later.
Viktors Eglītis	1945-04-20	Soviet Union	Unknown	Leading figure in the Latvian decadent movement and an introducer of modernist poetics	Accused of being a fascist collaborator during the Soviet era.
August Kop	1945-04-30	Netherlands (detained by Japan)	Unknown	Field hockey player, won the Silver medal at the 1928 Summer Olympics	
Frederik Lamp	1945-05-27	Netherlands (detained by Japan)	Unknown	Sprinter, participant in the 1924 Summer Olympics	
Emil Hácha	1945-06-27	Czechoslovakia	Unknown	3rd President of Czechoslovakia, later of the Protectorate Bohemia and Moravia	
Robert A. Jaffray	1945-07-29	Canada (detained by Japan)	Malnutrition, illness	Evangelical Missionary in China and Indonesia	
Robert Ley	1945-10-25	Germany (detained by the Allied Powers)	Suicide by hanging	Nazi war criminal	
Damase Pierre-Louis	1945	Haiti	Unknown	Historian, author, diplomat	
Tito Agosti	1946-01-27	Italy (detained by the Allied Powers)	Suicide	Major general, served in four wars	
Seán McCaughey	1946-05-11	Ireland	Hunger strike	Officer Commanding of the IRA Northern Command	
Hermann Göring	1946-10-15	Germany (detained by the Allied Powers)	Suicide by poison	Nazi war criminal	
Ioannis Rallis	1946-10-26	Greece	Natural causes	Prime Minister of Greece during the Axis occupation	
Victor Lustig	1947-03-11	Czechoslovakia	Pneumonia	Con artist, sold the Eiffel Tower	
Giovanni Battista Caneva	1947-02-12	Italy	Injuries caused by his detainees	federal secretary of the Republican Fascist Party, head of the province of Reggio Emilia	
Walter Nicolai	1947-05-04	Germany (detained by the Soviet Union)	Heart attack	Head of Abteilung III b in World War I	
Frits Clausen	1947-12-05	Denmark	Heart attack	Leader of the DNSAP	
Raoul Wallenberg	1947 or later	Sweden (believed to have been detained by the Soviet Union)	Unknown (debated)	Diplomat, rescued Jews during the Holocaust	Extrajudicial punishment in Soviet Lefortovo prison
Georgios Tsolakoglou	1948-05-22	Greece	Leukemia	Prime Minister of Greece during the Axis occupation	

== 1950s ==
Name	Date of death	Nationality	Cause of death	Known for	Comments
Grigory Gukovsky	1950-04-02	Soviet Union	Heart attack	Literary historian, rediscovered 18th-century Russian literature	
Peter Novopashenny	October 1950	Soviet Union	Unknown	Marine Officer, cryptanalyst	
Rafael Simón Urbina	1950-11-13	Venezuela	Murder	Rebel	
Patrick James Byrne	1950-11-25	United States	Pneumonia	Catholic missionary and bishop	
Werner Haase	1950-11-30	Germany (detained by the Soviet Union)	Tuberculosis	SS member and one of Adolf Hitler's personal physicians	Likely died in Butyrka prison
Terry Waters	1951-04-22	United Kingdom (detained by North Korea)	Unknown	Soldier, awarded with the George Cross	Captured at the Battle of the Imjin River during the Korean War
Gaspare Pisciotta	1954-02-09	Italy	Strychnine poisoning	Companion of Salvatore Giuliano	
Rudolf Beran	1954-04-23	Czechoslovakia	Natural causes	Prime minister of Czechoslovakia and the Protectorate of Bohemia and Moravia	
Muhammad Zarqtuni	1954-06-18	Morocco	Suicide by poisoning	Moroccan nationalist	
Jaroslav Krejčí	1956-05-18	Czechoslovakia	Natural causes	Prime minister of the Protectorate of Bohemia and Moravia	
Dominik Trčka	1959-03-23	Czechoslovakia	Pneumonia	Redemptorist priest	Regarded as a martyr of the Catholic Church. He was later beatified in 2001.
Karl Jäger	1959-06-22	West Germany	Suicide by hanging	Nazi war criminal	
Ion Gigurtu	1959-11-24	Romania	Unknown illness	Romanian politician, Foreign Minister and Prime Minister of Romania	Rehabilitated by the Romanian Supreme Court in 1999.

== 1960s ==
Name	Date of death	Nationality	Cause of death	Known for	Comments
Nepomuceno Matallana	1960-01-24	Colombia	Bronchitis with heart failure	Murderer and suspected serial killer	
Pavel Peter Gojdič	1960-07-17	Czechoslovakia	Terminal cancer	Eparch of the Slovak Greek Catholic Eparchy of Prešov	Imprisoned by the StB because the Communist government outlawed the Greek Catholic Church. He was later beatified in 2001 and recognised as Righteous Among the Nations in 2007.
Ajax Delgado	1960-09-05	Nicaragua	Murder	Coffee grower, political activist	
Guido Zingerle	1962-08-09	Italy	Liver cancer	Serial killer and rapist, "The Monster of Tyrol"	
Robert Stroud	1963-11-21	United States	Natural causes	The Birdman of Alcatraz	
Lee Harvey Oswald	1963-11-24	United States	Shot by Jack Ruby	Marine and serial killer; known as the prime suspect of the assassination of John F. Kennedy	Was transferring from Dallas County Jail to a City Jail
Fabricio Ojeda	1966-06-21	Venezuela	Suicide by hanging	Guerrilla leader, politician and journalist	
Jack Ruby	1967-01-03	United States	Pulmonary embolism	American nightclub owner	Murdered Lee Harvey Oswald
Ilse Koch	1967-09-01	West Germany	Suicide by hanging	Wife of the Commandant of Buchenwald concentration camp	
Vito Genovese	1969-02-14	Italy United States	Heart attack	Italian-American mobster, leader of the Genovese crime family	
Bonifacio Ondó Edú	1969-03-05	Equatorial Guinea	Official version: suicide	Former Prime Minister of Spanish Guinea	According to one account, Ondó Edú was tortured in Black Beach prison for ten days by Mariano Mdemendongo, a member of the national guard, before finally being executed.
Don Drummond	1969-05-06	Jamaica	Official version: natural causes	Ska trombonist, composer	Convicted of murdering his lover Anita Mahfood, the official cause of death is disputed
Liu Shaoqi	1969-11-12	China	Pneumonia / unknown illness	Former Chairman of the People's Republic of China	Died of mistreatment as a result of political persecution during the Cultural Revolution

== 1970s ==
Name	Date of death	Nationality	Cause of Death	Known for	Comments
Josef Bachmann	1970-02-24	West Germany	Suicide	Attempt to assassinate APO student leader Rudi Dutschke	
Mahmud al-Muntasir	1970-09-28	Libya	Unknown	1st Prime Minister of Libya	
Leopold Takawira	1970	Southern Rhodesia	Neglect of his diabetes by the prison authorities	Vice-president of the Zimbabwe African National Union	
George Jackson	1971-08-21	United States	Shot to death during an escape attempt	Co-founder of the Black Guerrilla Family and one of the Soledad Brothers	
Mack Ray Edwards	1971-10-30	United States	Suicide by hanging	Child molester and serial killer	
Franco Serantini	1972-05-07	Italy	Coma	Anarchist	
Pedro Luis Boitel	1972-05-25	Cuba	Hunger strike	Poet and dissident	
Lee Roy Martin	1972-05-31	United States	Stabbed by fellow inmate	Serial killer	
Yuri Galanskov	1972-11-04	Soviet Union	Death from an operation by a former doctor (another inmate) without surgical qualifications	Russian poet, historian, and human rights activist, imprisoned for his writings	
Yoro Diakité	1973-06-13	Mali	Unknown	Prime Minister of Mali, Head of the Provisional Government, first Vice President of Mali	
Albert DeSalvo	1973-11-25	United States	Murder	The Boston Strangler	
Michael Gaughan	1974-06-03	Ireland (detained by the United Kingdom)	Hunger strike	Member of the Official Irish Republican Army	
Holger Meins	1974-11-09	West Germany	Hunger strike	Member of the Red Army Faction	
Charles Foussard	1974	Australia	Natural causes	Longest-serving prisoner in the World	
Charles Schmid	1975-03-30	United States	Stabbed by two fellow inmates	Serial killer	
Siegfried Hausner	1975-05-05	West Germany	Severe burns untreated in custody	Member of the Red Army Faction	
Katharina Hammerschmidt	1975-06-29	West Germany	Untreated cancer	Member of the Red Army Faction	
Vladimir Herzog	1975-10-25	Yugoslavia Brazil	Suicide by hanging	Journalist, university professor and playwright	According to opposition, he was murdered by the DOI-CODI officers
Frank Stagg	1976-02-12	Ireland (detained by the United Kingdom)	Hunger strike	Volunteer in the Provisional Irish Republican Army	
Ulrike Meinhof	1976-05-09	West Germany	Suicide by hanging	Founding member of the Red Army Faction	
Alioune Dramé	1977-03-01	Guinea	Unknown	Economist and politician, ambassador to Ivory Coast	
Claudio Camaso	1977-09-16	Italy	Suicide by hanging	Actor, brother of Gian Maria Volonté	Imprisoned for the murder of Vincenzo Mazza.
Steve Biko	1977-10-18	South Africa	Bludgeoned to death by South African police	South African anti-Apartheid activist	Forty-sixth political detainee to die during interrogation since the government introduced laws permitting imprisonment without trial in 1963.
Andreas Baader	1977-10-18	West Germany	Suicide by shooting	Leader of the Red Army Faction	
Gudrun Ensslin	1977-10-18	West Germany	Suicide by hanging	Founding member of the Red Army Faction	
Jan-Carl Raspe	1977-10-18	West Germany	Suicide by shooting	Member of the Red Army Faction	
Ingrid Schubert	1977-11-12	West Germany	Suicide by hanging	Member of the Red Army Faction	
Joseph Kotalla	1979-07-31	Germany (detained by the Netherlands)	Natural causes	SS soldier, head of the administration of Kamp Amersfoort concentration camp	
Haregot Abbai	1979	Ethiopia	Murder	Businessman, politician	

== 1980s ==
Name	Date of death	Nationality	Cause of death	Known for	Comments
Pat Hare	1980-09-26	United States	Lung cancer	American electric blues guitarist and singer	
Richard Chase	1980-12-26	United States	Suicide	Serial killer, cannibal and necrophile; also known as "The Vampire of Sacramento"	
James Mitose	1981-03-26	United States	Diabetes	Martial artist, brought the art of Kenpo to the United States	
Thor Christiansen	1981-03-30	United States	Stabbed by an unknown killer	Serial killer and necrophile	
Sigurd Debus	1981-04-16	West Germany	Hunger strike	Alleged member of the Red Army Faction	
Bobby Sands	1981-05-05	United Kingdom	Hunger strike	Irish republican, member of the Provisional Irish Republican Army	Died on hunger strike. See 1981 Irish Hunger Strike
Francis Hughes	1981-05-12	United Kingdom	Hunger strike	Volunteer in the Provisional Irish Republican Army	Died on hunger strike. See 1981 Irish Hunger Strike
Raymond McCreesh	1981-05-21	United Kingdom	Hunger strike	Volunteer in the South Armagh Brigade of the Provisional Irish Republican Army	Died on hunger strike. See 1981 Irish Hunger Strike
Patsy O'Hara	1981-05-21	United Kingdom	Hunger strike	Member of the Irish National Liberation Army	Died on hunger strike. See 1981 Irish Hunger Strike
Joe McDonnell	1981-07-08	United Kingdom	Hunger strike	Volunteer in the Provisional Irish Republican Army	Died on hunger strike. See 1981 Irish Hunger Strike
Martin Hurson	1981-07-13	United Kingdom	Hunger strike	Volunteer in the East Tyrone Brigade of the Provisional Irish Republican Army	Died on hunger strike. See 1981 Irish Hunger Strike
Kevin Lynch	1981-08-01	United Kingdom	Hunger strike	Member of the Irish National Liberation Army	Died on hunger strike. See 1981 Irish Hunger Strike
Kieran Doherty	1981-08-02	United Kingdom	Hunger strike	Volunteer in the Belfast Brigade of the Provisional Irish Republican Army	Died on hunger strike. See 1981 Irish Hunger Strike
Thomas McElwee	1981-08-08	United Kingdom	Hunger strike	Volunteer in the Provisional Irish Republican Army	Died on hunger strike. See 1981 Irish Hunger Strike
Ervil LeBaron	1981-08-15	United States	Natural causes	American Mormon fundamentalist	
Michael Devine	1981-08-20	United Kingdom	Hunger strike	Volunteer in the Irish National Liberation Army	Died on hunger strike. See 1981 Irish Hunger Strike
Charles Yukl	1982-08-22	United States	Suicide	Ragtime pianist and murderer	
Umar Muhayshi	c. January 1984	Libya	Torture	Army officer and member of the Libyan Revolutionary Command Council	
Michele Sindona	1986-03-22	Italy	Cyanide poisoning (likely suicide)	Banker for the Sicilian Mafia and the Vatican	
Odysseas Angelis	1987-03-22	Greece	Suicide	Military officer, Chief of the Hellenic Armed Forces, Vice President of Greece	
Sadamichi Hirasawa	1987-05-10	Japan	Pneumonia	Tempera painter convicted of mass poisoning	
Tsai Chen-chou	1987-05-14	Taiwan	Liver disease	Politician and businessman	
Rudolf Hess	1987-08-14	Germany (held by the Four-Power Authorities)	Suicide	Nazi war criminal	Was the sole inmate in Spandau Prison from 1966 until his death. The prison was demolished afterwards.
Roberto Succo	1988-05-23	Italy	Suicide by suffocating	Serial killer	
Roy Buchanan	1988-08-01	United States	Suicide by hanging	American guitarist	His death is still the subject of fierce debate.
Bill Wallace	1989-07-17	Australia	Natural causes	Murderer	Listed in Guinness World Records as the oldest prisoner in world history until he was surpassed by Brij Bihari Pandey in 2011.
Abdulwahid AlAbduljabbar	1989	Saudi Arabia	Severe hemorrhage caused by torture	Political activist	

== 1990s ==
Name	Date of death	Nationality	Cause of death	Known for	Comments
Michael Tan Teow	1990-05-08	Singapore	Suicide by pill overdose	Convicted murderer and former actor	Died in a solitary confinement cell at Changi Prison's death row section. Found guilty in 1985 of murdering a landlady and her two children, and sentenced to hang. His accomplice Lim Beng Hai, also on death row, was put to death five months later on 5 October 1990
Graham Young	1990-08-01	United Kingdom	Heart attack	Poisoner	Died in Parkhurst prison. Heart attack is the official cause of death, but there has been speculation that other prisoners may have been responsible.
Klaus Barbie	1991-09-25	Germany (detained by France)	Leukemia	Nazi war criminal	
Richard Speck	1991-12-05	United States	Heart attack	American mass murderer	
Robert Berdella	1992-10-08	United States	Heart attack	Serial killer	
Orton Chirwa	1992-10-20	Malawi	Unknown	Lawyer and political leader	
Robert Biehler	1993-01-10	United States	Cancer	Serial killer	
Jeffrey Feltner	1993-03-17	United States	AIDS	Serial killer	
Kurt-Werner Wichmann	1993-04-25	Germany	Suicide by hanging	Serial killer	He hanged himself only 10 days after his arrest. The Netflix miniseries Dig Deeper: The Disappearance of Birgit Meier concentrates on his case.
Walter Breen	1993-04-27	United States	Cancer	American child molester	
Garry David	1993-07-11	Australia	Died from wounds caused by self-mutilation	Robbery and attempted murder	
Liow Han Heng	1993-08-10	Singapore	Heart attack	Convicted murderer and former goldsmith shop worker	Died in a solitary confinement cell at Changi Prison's death row section. Found guilty in 1992 of kidnapping and murdering his former employer, and sentenced to hang. His accomplice Ibrahim Masod, also on death row, was put to death 11 months later on 29 July 1994
Joe "Pegleg" Morgan	1993-11-08	Mexico (detained by the United States)	Liver cancer	Mexican Mafia leader	
Luciano Leggio	1993-11-15	Italy	Heart attack	Mafioso, head of the Corleonesi	Succeeded by Salvatore Riina
Jack Unterweger	1994-06-29	Austria	Suicide	Serial killer with estimated 12-15 victims	
Michele Zaza	1994-07-18	Italy	Heart attack	Mafioso, head of the Camorra clan	Succeeded by his nephew Ciro Mazzarella.
Daniel Camargo Barbosa	1994-11-13	Colombia (detained by Ecuador)	Stabbed to death by Geovanny Noguera, a nephew of one of his victims	Serial killer and rapist	
Jeffrey Dahmer	1994-11-28	United States	Beaten to death by fellow inmate Christopher Scarver	American serial killer and cannibal	
Jesse Anderson	1994-11-30	United States	Beaten to death by fellow inmate Christopher Scarver	American murderer	
Fred West	1995-01-01	United Kingdom	Suicide by hanging	Multiple murders; was on remand awaiting trial	
Michael Lupo	1995-02-12	Italy (detained by the United Kingdom)	AIDS	Serial killer	
Edwin Kaprat	1995-04-19	United States	Stabbed by two inmates	Serial killer	
Sadibou Hydara	1995-06-06	Gambia	Murder	Military and political leader	
Kenneth Michael Trentadue	1995-08-21	United States	Suicide by hanging	Arrested during the investigation of the Oklahoma City bombing	Trentadue's family maintains that he was murdered by members of the FBI
Ronald Kray	1995-09-07	United Kingdom	Heart attack	British gangster and murderer, twin brother of Reginald Kray	
Robert Wayne Danielson	1995-09-07	United States	Suicide by hanging	Serial killer	
Gerard John Schaefer	1995-12-03	United States	Stabbed to death	American murderer	
Alfons Noviks	1996-03-12	Latvia	Unknown	Politician	Charged with a life sentence for signing orders for the Soviet deportations from Latvia
Ottis Toole	1996-09-15	United States	Cirrhosis	Serial killer	Known as the prime suspect of the murder of Adam Walsh, his father John Walsh would host America's Most Wanted and becoming an advocacy for missing children
Giuseppe Giacomo Gambino	1996-11-30	Italy	Suicide	Mafioso, deputy of Totò Riina	
James Earl Ray	1998-04-23	United States (detained by the United Kingdom)	Hepatitis C	Convicted for assassination of Martin Luther King Jr. Joseph Glenn Smothers	Murdered by two inmates, aged 30s. Was taken to Alabama for funeral.
Moshood Abiola	1998-07-07	Nigeria	Heart attack	Honorary supreme military commander of the Oyo Empire	His death is disputed, with some believing he was poisoned or beaten to death.
Kaya	1999-02-21	Mauritius	Unknown	Musician, creator of Seggae	Arrested for smoking marijuana during one of his concerts
Aleksandr Komin	1999-06-15	Russia	Suicide by cutting	Enslaver, serial killer	Kept six people as prisoners in a 9-meter-deep bunker under his garage and killed four of them.
Saeed Emami	1999-06-19	Iran	Suicide	Deputy minister of intelligence under Ali Fallahian	His death was officially ruled as a suicide, although this is disputed by Iranian dissidents who believe he was murdered in order to prevent him leaking sensitive information.
Georgios Papadopoulos	1999-06-27	Greece	ALS, bladder cancer	Military dictator of the Greek junta	
Frank Valdes	1999-07-17	United States	Beaten to death by correctional officers	Murderer	
Dimitri Tsafendas	1999-10-07	South Africa	Pneumonia	South African assassin	Political militant who assassinated Hendrik Verwoerd on 6 September 1966, during the apartheid regime
Salvatore Greco	1999	Italy	Cancer	Mafioso, brother of Michele Greco	

== 2000s ==
Name	Date of death	Nationality	Cause of death	Known for	Comments
Harry Riccobene	2000-06-19	Italy United States	Sepsis	Mobster of the Philadelphia crime family	
Oleg Kuznetsov	2000-08-04	Russia	Heart failure	Serial killer, rapist	Killed 10 girls and women between 1991 and 1992.
Ruslan Alikhadzhiyev	2000	Russia	Torture or heart attack	Parliamentary speaker of Chechenia	Disappeared in 2000, his death was reported as a prison death by Chechenpress and AFP; the FSB denied that
Byron De La Beckwith	2001-01-21	United States	Heart attack	American white supremacist	Klansman from Greenwood, Mississippi who assassinated civil rights leader Medgar Evers on June 12, 1963.
Henry Lee Lucas	2001-03-12	United States	Heart failure	"The Confession Killer"	
Shankar Suppiahmaniam	2001-08-10	Singapore	Murdered by his fellow cellmate Kanesan Ratnam, who was later sentenced to death for murdering him	Charged with raping and abducting two young girls, and also his murder	Died 3 days before he was scheduled to stand trial
Thomas Schleicher	2001-11-02	Austria	Suicide	Judoka and participant of the 1996 Summer Olympics	Convicted for drug trafficking
Evison Matafale	2001-11-27	Malawi	Pneumonia	Reggae musician	
Iván Urdinola Grajales	2002-02-02	Colombia	Heart attack	leader of the Norte del Valle Cartel, "El enano"	
John Gotti	2002-06-10	United States	Throat cancer	American mafia boss	
Gerald Gallego	2002-07-18	United States	Rectal cancer	Serial killer	
Turpal-Ali Atgeriyev	2002-08-18	Russia	Official version: inner bleedings caused by leukemia	National security minister of Chechnya	His relatives claimed he was tortured to death.
Angelo Buono Jr.	2002-09-21	United States	Heart attack	Serial killer	One of two perperators of The Hillside Strangler, was sentenced to life in prison without possibility of parole
Myra Hindley	2002-11-15	United Kingdom	Died in hospital after heart attack in prison	British serial killer	
Habibullah	2002-12-04	Afghanistan (detained by the United States)	Pulmonary embolism due to blunt force injury to the legs	Mullah, brother of a Taliban leader	His death was initially attributed to "natural causes" by the military. The autopsy later classified Habibullah's death as homicide.
Dilawar	2002-12-10	Afghanistan (detained by the United States)	"Blunt-force injuries to lower extremities complicating coronary artery disease" caused from torture	Farmer and taxi driver	The documentary film Taxi to the Dark Side (2007) focuses on his death.
Salman Raduyev	2002-12-14	Russia	Official version: "Serious and protracted diseases"	Chechen military commander, responsible for the Kizlyar hostage taking raid	His family and others claim that he was murdered by the authorities in prison.
Fesshaye Yohannes	2002-12-13 or 2007-01-11	Eritrea	Unknown	Journalist	
Archibald Hall	2002-09-16	United Kingdom	Stroke	Serial killer and thief	
John Geoghan	2003-08-23	United States	Murdered by fellow inmate Joseph Druce	Catholic priest and child molester	
Hassan Evan Naseem	2003-09-19	Maldives	Beaten to death by the NSS personnel during a riot	His death lead to the 2003 Maldives civil unrest	
Md. Yakub Ali	2003-10-17	Bangladesh	Unknown	Bangladesh Nationalist Party activist	
Jahangir Hossain	2003-10-17	Bangladesh	Unknown	Bangladesh Nationalist Party activist	
Manadel al-Jamadi	2003-11-04	Iraq (detained by the United States)	Died from torture during a CIA interrogation	Suspect in a bomb attack, also known as "The Iceman", "Mr. Frosty" and "Bernie"	His death was a trigger of the 2003-2004 Abu Ghraib torture and prisoner abuse scandal
Abed Hamed Mowhoush	2003-11-26	Iraq (detained by the United States)	Died from torture during a CIA interrogation	Air vice-marshal of the Iraqi Air Force	His death was initially attributed to "natural causes" by the CIA. After the Abu Ghraib torture and prisoner abuse scandal erupted, the Pentagon acknowledged that the cause of death was "asphyxia due to smothering and chest compression", and that his body showed "evidence of blunt force trauma to the chest and legs".
Harold Shipman	2004-01-13	United Kingdom	Suicide by hanging	British doctor who killed many of his patients	Also known as "Dr. Death" and "Angel of Death"
Abu Abbas	2004-03-08	Palestine (detained by the United States in Iraq)	Natural causes	Terrorist	
Gaetano Badalamenti	2004-04-29	Italy (detained by the United States)	Heart failure	Mafioso, head of the Sicilian Mafia Commission, leader in the "Pizza Connection"	
Clayton Fountain	2004-07-12	United States	Natural causes	Member of the Aryan Brotherhood	
Victor Kaliadin	2004-09-16	Russia	Heart attack	CEO of the company Elers Electron	
John Wayne Glover	2005-09-09	Australia	Suicide by hanging	Sydney Granny Murderer	
Anthony Sawoniuk	2005-11-06	Belarus United Kingdom		Nazi collaborator	
Vincent Gigante	2005-12-19	United States	Oxygen deprivation	American Mafia boss	Boss of Genovese crime family
Stuart Alexander	2005-12-27	United States	Pulmonary embolism	Businessman and murderer	Also known as "The Sausage King" because he was recognized and renowned for making linguiça sausage.
Richard Kuklinski	2006-03-05	United States	Cardiac arrest	"The Iceman"	
Milan Babić	2006-03-05	Croatia (detained by the Netherlands)	Suicide by hanging	President of the unrecognised Republic of Serbian Krajina	
Slobodan Milošević	2006-03-11	Serbia and Montenegro (detained by the Netherlands)	Heart attack	Serbian and Yugoslav president during the Yugoslav Wars	
Domenico Libri	2006-05-01	Italy	Unknown	Member of the 'Ndrangheta	
Andrew Martinez	2006-05-18	United States	Suicide	Nude activist	
Samuel Bowers	2006-05-18	United States	Cardiopulmonary arrest	American white supremacist	Co-founded the White Knights of the Ku Klux Klan and convicted of bombing death of civil rights leader Vernon Dahmer.
Ogulsapar Muradova	August/September 2006	Turkmenistan	Official version: Natural causes	Human rights activist, journalist	The official cause of death is disputed by her children.
Ron Porambo	2006-10-22	United States	Choking on an orange	Journalist who covered the 1967 Newark riots	Charged with 30 years for felony murder, conspiracy to commit robbery, two counts of armed robbery, burglary, and possession of a firearm for an unlawful purpose.
Samuel Hinga Norman	2007-02-22	Sierra Leone	Natural causes	Founder and leader of the Civil Defence Forces	
Charles Harrelson	2007-03-15	United States	Heart attack	Hitman, convicted of murdering U.S. Federal judge John H. Wood Jr.	Father of actor Woody Harrelson.
David Lane	2007-03-28	United States	Epilepsy	American white nationalist	
Stanley Rice	2007-11-03	United States	Natural causes	Serial killer, sex offender	
Sergei Ryakhovsky	2007-11-12	Russia	Tuberculosis	Serial killer	
John Straffen	2007-11-19	United Kingdom	Natural causes	Serial killer and child murderer	Longest-serving prisoner in British legal history, was in prison for 55 years until his death
Ryan Gracie	2007-12-15	Brazil	Died as a result of brain injury	Mixed martial artist	
Michele Greco	2008-02-13	Italy	Lung cancer	Mafioso, head of the Sicilian Mafia Commission	
Germano Nati	2008-03-17	Eritrea	Bladder and kidney infections	Politician of the EPLF	
Vlado Taneski	2008-06-23	Republic of Macedonia	Suicide by drowning in a plastic bucket of water	Serial killer	
Dinko Šakić	2008-07-20	Croatia	Heart problems	Commander of the Jasenovac concentration camp	
Johnny "J"	2008-10-03	Mexico / United States	Suicide	Songwriter, music producer and rapper	Charged with driving while intoxicated
Arthur Shawcross	2008-11-10	United States	Cardiac arrest	Serial killer	
Son Jong-nam	2008-12-07	North Korea	Unknown (probably torture)	North Korean defector and Christian missionary	
Antonie Dixon	2009-02-04	New Zealand	Suicide	New Zealand thief and murderer	
Omid Reza Mir Sayafi	2009-03-18	Iran	Unknown	Blogger and journalist	Arrested for allegedly insulting religious leaders and engaging in propaganda against the Islamic Republic of Iran.
Maxim Bazylev	2009-03-27	Russia	Suicide by cutting the veins on his forearms and neck	Russian nationalist, last leader of the NSO	
Toi Aukuso Cain	2009-04-18	Samoa	Liver cancer	Politician	Arrested for the murder of Luagalau Leva'ula Kamu
Ibn al-Shaykh al-Libi	2009-05-10	Libya	Torture	Leader of the Khalden training camp	His death was officially ruled as suicide by hanging.
Fathi Eljahmi	2009-05-21	Libya	Unknown	Politic dissident	
Christopher Lunz	2009-09-22	United States	Suicide	Serial killer	
Andrzej Kunowski	2009-09-23	Poland (detained by United Kingdom)	Heart failure	Serial rapist and serial killer	Known as the "Beast of Mława"
Susan Atkins	2009-09-24	United States	Brain tumor	Member of the Manson family	
John Evander Couey	2009-09-30	United States	Cancer	Sex offender convicted of murdering Jessica Lunsford	
Sergei Magnitsky	2009-11-16	Russia	Closed cerebral cranial injury	Russian tax accountant who specialized in anti-corruption activities	Magnitsky alleged there had been large-scale theft from the Russian state, sanctioned and carried out by Russian officials. He was arrested and eventually died in prison. The documentary The Magnitsky Act – Behind the Scenes concentrates on his case.

== 2010s ==
Name	Date of death	Nationality	Cause of death	Known for	Comments
Orlando Zapata	2010-02-23	Cuba	Hunger strike	Political activist	
Carlo Cicuttini	2010-02-24	Italy	Lung cancer	Neofascist terrorist	
Peter Woodcock	2010-03-05	Canada	Natural causes	Serial killer and child rapist	Murdered a fellow patient in 1991.
Edwin Valero	2010-04-19	Venezuela	Suicide	Professional boxer	
Carl Williams	2010-04-19	Australia	Bludgeoned to death	Australian crime boss	Murdered by fellow inmate while serving sentence
Germain Cyrille Ngota Ngota	2010-04-22	Cameroon	HIV	Editor for the Cameroun Express	Charged with falsifying a government document, the first journalist to die in the line of duty in Cameroon since 1992
Sipho Jele	2010-05-04	Swaziland	Suicide by hanging	Member of the banned party People's United Democratic Movement	
Wallace Souza	2010-07-27	Brazil	Heart attack due to Budd–Chiari syndrome	Television presenter and politician	
Philip Markoff	2010-08-15	United States	Suicide	Medical student	Known as the "Craigslist killer"; committed suicide before his trial
Dimitrios Ioannidis	2010-08-16	Greece	Respiratory problems	Military dictator of the Greek junta	
Terry Peder Rasmussen	2010-12-28	United States	lung cancer, chronic obstructive pulmonary disease and pneumonia	Serial killer with six known victims	
Fawza Falih	2010	Saudi Arabia	Official version: Choking on her food	Condemned to death for practicing witchcraft	
Akrom Yoʻldoshev	2010/11	Uzbekistan	Tuberculosis	Founder of Akromiya	
Colin Hatch	2011-02-22	United Kingdom	Strangled to death by fellow inmate	Notorious murderer and child molester	
Dorothea Puente	2011-03-27	United States	Natural causes	Serial killer	
Lee Bradley Brown	2011-04-12	United Kingdom (detained by the United Arab Emirates)	Unknown	Tourist, his cause of death is still disputed	
Donald Neilson	2011-12-18	United Kingdom	Respiratory failure	Kidnapper and murderer	Also known as "Handy Andy", "The Phantom" and "The Black Panther"
Edarem	2012-01-08	United States	Lung cancer	American Internet personality	
Colin Ireland	2012-02-21	United Kingdom	Died as a result of hip injury.	British serial killer known as the "Gay Slayer"	
William Heirens	2012-03-05	United States	Complications from diabetes	Serial killer and the longest-serving prisoner in Illinois.	Known as the "Lipstick Killer"
Trevor Hardy	2012-09-25	United Kingdom	Heart attack	Serial killer known as "The Beast of Manchester"	
Miguel Abia Biteo Boricó	2012-12-06	Equatorial Guinea	Cardiac arrest	Former Prime Minister of Equatorial Guinea	
Richard Ramirez	2013-06-07	United States	Cancer	American serial killer	
Tjostolv Moland	2013-08-18	Norway (detained by the Democratic Republic of the Congo)	Suicide	Sentenced to death for murder, and espionage for Norway	Died in Congolese custody
Anatoly Onoprienko	2013-08-27	Ukraine	Heart attack	Serial killer and mass murderer	
Ariel Castro	2013-09-03	United States	Suicide or accidental strangulation	Kidnapped and raped three American women for over a decade	
Heinrich Boere	2013-12-01	Germany	Natural causes	Nazi war criminal	
Raymond Leslie Morris	2014-03-11	United Kingdom	Natural causes	Child murderer	
John Anthony Walker	2014-08-28	United States	Unknown	United States Navy Chief Warrant Officer convicted of spying for the Soviet Union from 1968 to 1985	
Anushervon Rakhmanov	2015-04-02	Tajikistan Russia	Suicide by hanging	Suspected serial killer	
William MacDonald	2015-05-12	United Kingdom (detained by Australia)	Gastrointestinal blockage	Serial killer	Also known as "The Mutilator"
Sandra Bland	2015-07-13	United States	Suicide (allegedly)	American motorist	Arrested for traffic violation on July 10 by State Trooper Brian Encinia. Encinia was indicted for perjury for making false statements about the circumstances of Bland's arrest. Waller County jail failed to follow required policies and procedures.
Manuel Contreras	2015-08-07	Chile	Unspecified kidney problems	Army officer, former head of the National Intelligence Directorate	He was serving 59 unappealable sentences totaling 529 years in prison at the time of his death.
Marcelo Moren Brito	2015-09-11	Chile	Multiple organ failure	Retired Army colonel and former agent of the Dirección de Inteligencia Nacional	He was sentenced to more than 300 years in prison.
Sarah Reed	2016-01-11	United Kingdom	Suicide/accidental death	On remand awaiting possible trial pending psychiatric reports	Charged with GBH with intent
Lawrence Phillips	2016-01-13	United States	Suicide	American football player	Phillips was facing the death penalty in the alleged murder of his former cellmate in April 2015.
Jacques Bihozagara	2016-03-30	Rwanda (detained by Burundi)	Unknown (probably assassination)	Rwandan ambassador to France and Belgium	Arrested on suspicion of espionage, died only minutes after arriving at the prison infirmary.
Ahmet Suphi Altindoken	2016-04-11	Turkey	Shot to death by fellow inmate	Murderer and attempted rapist	
Vladimir Dolgopolov	2016-06-12	Russia	Stroke	Soccer player, won a Master of Sports of the USSR award	Was found guilty of negligent homicide and sentenced to 10 years of imprisonment in January 2016
Bernardo Provenzano	2016-07-13	Italy	Bladder cancer	Mafioso, chief of the Corleonesi	
Lou Pearlman	2016-08-19	United States	Cardiac arrest	Manager of Backstreet Boys and *NSYNC	
Gennadiy Tsypkalov	2016-09-24	Ukraine	Unknown (official version: Suicide)	Politician of the Luhansk People's Republic	
Nicodemo Scarfo	2017-01-13	United States	Natural causes	Boss of the Philadelphia crime family	
Alec Kreider	2017-01-20	United States	Suicide by hanging	Convicted murderer	
Omar Abdel-Rahman	2017-02-18	Egypt (detained by the United States)	Coronary arterial disease	Terrorist	
Lawrence Horn	February 2017	United States	Unknown	Musician, record producer	Arrested for hiring a hit man to murder his ex-wife, Mildred Horn, their disabled son Trevor, and nurse Janice Saunders.
Donald Harvey	2017-03-30	United States	Killed by fellow inmate	Serial killer	
Aaron Hernandez	2017-04-19	United States	Suicide	Former tight-end for NFL team New England Patriots, later convicted of murdering Odin Lloyd	Found not guilty of the 2012 double homicide of Daniel de Abreu and Safiro Furtado just 5 days before he was found dead.
Yip Kai Foon	2017-04-19	Hong Kong	Lung cancer	Hong Kong armed robber with AK-47	
Ian Brady	2017-05-15	United Kingdom	Cancer	British serial killer	
Masashi Daidōji	2017-05-24	Japan	Multiple myeloma	Founder of the East Asia Anti-Japan Armed Front	
Manuel Noriega	2017-05-29	Panama	Issues after a brain hemorrhage	Military dictator of Panama 1983-1989	
Liu Xiaobo	2017-07-13	China	Liver cancer	Prisoner of conscience	Nobel Peace Prize laureate (2010)
Carlos Andrés García	2017-09-17	Venezuela	Debated	Politician, councilman at the time of death	García suffered a stroke in detention. Security officials reportedly refused to give medical attention to García, ignored the orders to transfer him to a health center and did not give him medicines sent by his relatives. He was transferred to a hospital days afterwards.
Salvatore Riina	2017-11-17	Italy	Unknown	Mafioso, chief of the Sicilian Mafia	
Charles Manson	2017-11-19	United States	Natural causes	Leader of the Manson Family	
Nelson Martínez	2017-12-12	Venezuela	Health complications	Minister of Petroleum and President of Petróleos de Venezuela	
Ernst-Dieter Beck	2018-04-29	Germany	Unknown	Serial killer	He was the first person accused of murder in German legal history, on whom a chromosome test was applied.
Dennis Nilsen	2018-05-12	United Kingdom	Pulmonary embolism	British serial killer	
Brian Lawler	2018-07-29	United States	Suicide by hanging	Professional wrestler	
Ronnie Shelton	2018-09-25	United States	Suicide by jumping from a building	Serial rapist	
Fernando Albán	2018-10-08	Venezuela	Body fell from a tenth-floor of the headquarters of the Bolivarian Intelligence Service (SEBIN). Unofficially, Albán died before his fall and the autopsy revealed that water was found in his lungs.	Politician, councilman at the time of death	Initially ruled officially as a suicide, a version heavily disputed, authorities later admitted that Albán was killed during his detention.
Whitey Bulger	2018-10-30	United States	Killed by prison inmates	American mobster	
Andrew Urdiales	2018-11-02	United States	Suicide by hanging	Serial killer	
Serhiy Tkach	2018-11-04	Ukraine	Heart failure	Serial killer	
George Nassar	2018-12-03	United States	Prostate cancer	Murderer	
Harry Bowman	2019-03-03	United States	Cancer	International president of the Outlaws Motorcycle Club	
Carmine Persico	2019-03-07	United States	Natural causes	Boss of the Colombo crime family	
Thomas Silverstein	2019-05-11	United States	Complications from heart surgery	Leader of the Aryan Brotherhood	Spent the last 36 years of his life in solitary confinement for killing a corrections officer.
Mohamed Morsi	2019-06-17	Egypt	Egyptian state television announced on 17 June 2019 that Mohamed Morsi had collapsed during a court hearing on espionage charges at Cairo's Tora prison complex, and later died suddenly, reportedly of a heart attack.	Former President of Egypt	
Rafael Acosta Arévalo	2019-06-29	Venezuela	Widespread polytrauma, torture	Military officer with the rank of corvette captain	Died shortly after attending to a court hearing, arriving in a wheelchair and with serious indications of torture.
Dawid Kostecki	2019-08-02	Poland	Suicide by hanging	Light heavyweight boxer	Convicted for drug trafficking, car theft, running a prostitution escort ring, and income tax evasion.
Jeffrey Epstein	2019-08-10	United States	Suicide	American financier and convicted sex offender	Death of Jeffrey Epstein
Richard Huckle	2019-10-13	United Kingdom	Stabbed to death by fellow inmate	British serial sex offender and paedophile	Paul Fitzgerald, Huckle's killer, had several previous convictions for violent and sexual offences, and was sentenced to life imprisonment with a minimum term of 34 years on 24 November 2020.
Anthony McKnight	2019-10-17	United States	Unknown	Serial killer and rapist	
Ivan Milat	2019-10-27	Australia	Natural causes	Serial killer	
Lawrence Bittaker	2019-12-13	United States	Natural causes	Serial killer and rapist, one of the "Tool Box Killers"	
Phillip Carl Jablonski	2019-12-27	United States	Unknown	Serial killer	

== 2020s ==
Name	Date of death	Nationality	Cause of death	Known for	Comments
Roy Norris	2020-02-24	United States	Natural causes	Serial killer and rapist, one of the "Tool Box Killers"	
Lonnie David Franklin Jr.	2020-03-28	United States	Unknown	Serial killer, better known as the "Grim Sleeper"	
Shady Habash	2020-05-01	Egypt	Alcohol poisoning	Filmmaker	Was imprisoned without trial for making a music video for the exiled Egyptian rock musician Ramy Essam, that mocked Egyptian President Abdel Fattah el-Sisi.
Carlos Ernesto Escobar Mejía	2020-05-06	El Salvador (detained by United States)	COVID-19	The first immigrant to die from COVID-19 in the custody of U.S. Immigration and Customs Enforcement	
David Owen Brooks	2020-05-28	United States	COVID-19	Murderer	
Eddie Mosley	2020-05-28	United States	COVID-19	Serial killer and rapist	
Rocky Beamon	2020-06-10	United States	Suicide	Murderer	
Mário Calixto Filho	2020-06-17	Brazil	COVID-19	Politician, journalist and businessman	Convicted of government procurement fraud
Manuel Machado Alvarez	2020-07-03	Cuba (detained by United States)	COVID-19	Murderer	
Scott Erskine	2020-07-03	United States	COVID-19	Serial killer and rapist	
Mahendra Yadav	2020-07-05	India	COVID-19	Politician	
Andrey Yezhov	2020-07-06	Russia	Suicide by hanging	Serial killer and rapist	
Chua Ser Lien	2020-07-08	Singapore	Suicide	Former cleaning company director and convicted kidnapper	Sentenced to life imprisonment and three strokes of the cane in 2004. Suffered from bipolar disorder, which worsened during his final years before he died. Found eligible for parole in 2023
Nelson Meurer	2020-07-12	Brazil	COVID-19	Politician, mayor of Francisco Beltrão	Convicted on corruption and money laundering charges
Moussa Benhamadi	2020-07-17	Algeria	COVID-19	Politician and researcher	
David Romero Ellner	2020-07-18	Honduras	COVID-19	Journalist and lawyer, Liberal party congressman and former mayor of Tegucigalpa	
Jaybee Sebastian	2020-07-18	Philippines	COVID-19	Kidnapper and carjacker	
Jorge Villavicencio	2020-07-20	Guatemala	COVID-19	Former Guatemalan Minister of Public Health and Social Assistance	Was arrested over corruption accusations.
Azimzhan Askarov	2020-07-25	Kyrgyzstan	Pneumonia	Human rights activist, investigator of police brutality	Arrested and prosecuted on charges of creating mass disturbances, incitement of ethnic hatred, and complicity in murder.
Essam el-Erian	2020-08-13	Egypt	COVID-19	Vice Chairman of the Freedom and Justice Party	Arrested during the 2011 Egyptian revolution
Édouard Karemera	2020-08-31	Rwanda (detained by Senegal)	COVID-19	Politician convicted of genocide	
Maxim Martsinkevich	2020-09-16	Russia	Official version: Suicide	Neo-Nazi activist and vlogger	
Horst David	2020-11-08	Germany	Unknown	Serial killer	The investigation of his murder of the prostitute Fatima Grossart is considered a milestone in German criminal history because it was the first time that a crime that had occurred almost 20 years ago could be solved with the help of the automated fingerprint identification system.
Peter Sutcliffe	2020-11-13	United Kingdom	Complications from diabetes, hypertension and COVID-19 infection	Serial killer	
Anthony Hardy	2020-11-25	United Kingdom	COVID-19	Serial killer, the "Camden Ripper"	
Anthony Casso	2020-12-15	United States	COVID-19	Underboss of the Lucchese crime family	
Richard Valenti	2020-12-16	United States	Natural causes	Serial killer	At the time of his death, Valenti was incarcerated for more than 46 years. He received two consecutive life sentences for a 1973 double murder, and had been denied parole for 21 times.
Donato Bilancia	2020-12-17	Italy	COVID-19	Serial killer	
Romell Broom	2020-12-28	United States	COVID-19	Murder of Tryna Middleton	
Sofia Zhukova	2020-12-29	Russia	COVID-19	Serial killer	Being 80 years old at the time of her last murder, she was the oldest serial killer in the history of Russia and the Soviet Union.
Salvador Franco	2021-01-03	Venezuela	Tuberculosis and malnourishment.	Pemon political prisoner	Franco had COVID-19 and that for months suffered from gastrointestinal diseases related to the insalubrity of his penitentiary center, losing a large amount of weight in detention. There was a court order for his transfer to a health center, but it was ultimately ignored.
Phil Spector	2021-01-16	United States	Complications from COVID-19	American music producer	Was convicted of the 2003 murder of actress Lana Clarkson and was serving a 19 years to life prison sentence at the time of his death.
Nathaniel Burkett	2021-01-19	United States	COVID-19	Serial killer	
Raffaele Cutolo	2021-02-17	Italy	Natural causes	Founder of the Nuova Camorra Organizzata	
Daniela Figueredo	2021-03-13	Venezuela	Gunshot	Young detainee	Shot in the face by a police officer and killed at the age of 19. Human rights activists declared that the incident occurred when the officer tried to sexually abuse her.
Antonio Sanchez	2021-03-27	Philippines	Unknown	Politician, mayor of Calauan	
Bernie Madoff	2021-04-14	United States	Chronic kidney disease	Fraudster	
Vitold Ashurak	2021-05-21	Belarus	Official version: Cardiac arrest	Political and ecological activist	Sentenced to five years for his role in the 2020–2021 Belarusian protests, died four months after his imprisonment, the official cause of death is disputed
John McAfee	2021-06-23	United Kingdom	“Everything points to death by suicide,” according to the Guardian, except a previous statement: 'If I suicide myself, I didn't.'	Founded the software company McAfee Associates in 1987.	
Nyan Win	2021-07-20	Myanmar	COVID-19	Member-elect of Pyithu Hluttaw and Aung San Suu Kyi's personal attorney	
Rodney Alcala	2021-07-24	United States	Heart attack	Serial killer	Known as The Dating Game Killer when competed in The Dating Game; died while serving on a death row
Yevgen Sotnikov	2021-08-06	Ukraine	Murder	Judoka	Imprisoned for killing an 18-year old.
Robert Martin Gumbura	2021-08-07	Zimbabwe	COVID-19	Pastor	Was convicted with four counts of rape and possession of illegal pornographic material and sentenced to 40 years in prison.
Hugo Salas Wenzel	2021-08-11	Chile	Unknown	General of the Chilean Army	Was sentenced to life for human rights violations in the 1980s.
Hissène Habré	2021-08-24	Chad	COVID-19	5th president and dictator of Chad	
Abimael Guzmán	2021-09-11	Peru	Suicide by starvation	Maoist guerrilla leader and terrorist	
Frank LoCascio	2021-10-01	United States	COVID-19	Consigliere of the Gambino crime family	
Raúl Baduel	2021-10-12	Venezuela	Official version: cardiorespiratory arrest caused by COVID-19	Venezuelan general and former defense minister	The official cause of death is disputed by his family
Gilbert Dragon	2021-11-17	Haiti	COVID-19	Police chief and commander in the National Revolutionary Front for the Liberation and Reconstruction of Haiti	
Hamdi Hassan	2021-11-25	Egypt	Unknown	Member of the House of Representatives of Egypt and the Muslim Brotherhood	
Warren John Nutter	2021-12-08	United States	Chronic illness	Murderer and longest-serving inmate in Iowa	
Stephen Bouquet	2022-01-05	United Kingdom	COVID-19	Felicide who killed nine cats	
Robert Durst	2022-01-10	United States	COVID-19	Murderer	
Stephen Kovacs	2022-01-12	United States	Suicide by hanging	Saber fencer and fencing coach	Charged with multiple counts of sexual assault, endangering the welfare of a child and false swearing.
Danny Ranes	2022-01-29	United States	Natural causes	Serial killer	Brother of Larry Ranes
Hugo Torres Jiménez	2022-02-11	Nicaragua	Natural causes	Sandinista guerrilla, brigadier general in the Nicaraguan Armed Forces	
Soumeylou Boubèye Maïga	2022-03-21	Mali	Unknown	Former Prime Minister and Foreign Minister of Mali	
Gilberto Rodríguez Orejuela	2022-05-31	Colombia (detained by United States)	Lymphoma	One of the leaders of the Cali Cartel	
Dmitry Kolker	2022-07-02	Russia	Unknown	Physicist, head of the Laboratory of Quantum Optical Technologies of Novosibirsk State University	Arrested on suspicion of state treason in June 2022.
Maurice Boucher	2022-07-10	Canada	Throat cancer	President of the Quebec Nomads chapter of the Hells Angels Motorcycle Club	
Peter Tobin	2022-10-08	United Kingdom	Cancer	Serial killer and sex offender	
Booker T. Hillery	2023-01-16	United States	Natural causes	Child murderer and longest-serving prisoner in California	
Malcolm Robbins	2023-01-27	United States	Natural causes	Serial killer and child rapist	
Robert Hanssen	2023-06-05	United States	Colon cancer	FBI agent	Charged with selling U.S. intelligence documents to the Soviet Union and Russia over 22 years.
Ted Kaczynski	2023-06-10	United States	Suicide by hanging	Eco-terrorist, the "Unabomber"	
Ales Pushkin	2023-07-11	Belarus	Unknown	Artist and painter, awarded with the Belarusian Democratic Republic 100th Jubilee Medal	
Alphonso Cave	2023-08-03	United States	Unknown	Kidnapper and murderer of Frances Slater	
Gennady Lopyrev	2023-08-16	Russia	Official version: Leukemia	Former lieutenant-general in the FSO and overseer of various construction projects, including Putin's palace at Gelendzhik	Imprisoned in the IK-3 prison in 2017 for taking bribes, the official cause of death is disputed
Stephen Farrow	2023-08-21	United Kingdom	Unknown	Spree killer	
Anthony Sully	2023-09-08	United States	Natural causes	Serial killer and police officer	
Billy Chemirmir	2023-09-19	United States	Killed by cellmate	Serial killer	
Doug Clark	2023-10-11	United States	Killed by fellow inmate	Serial killer	
Luis Garavito	2023-10-12	Colombia	Heart attack, tuberculosis, leukemia, and eye cancer	Serial killer and child rapist	Known as "La Bestia" and "Tribilín"
Larry Ranes	2023-11-12	United States	Unknown, probably natural causes	Serial killer	Brother of Danny Ranes
Alejandro Muyshondt	2024-02-07	El Salvador	Official version: Pulmonary edema	Politician	The official version is disputed and his family believes that he died from torture.
Alexei Navalny	2024-02-16	Russia	Official version: Blood clot detachment	Russian opposition politician	Death of Alexei Navalny
Ihar Lednik	2024-02-20	Belarus	Issues after an operation of the gastrointestinal tract	Belarusian opposition activist	Sentenced to three years for the "defamation" of Belarusian President Alexander Lukashenko, in prison he was routinely abused by the jailers
Robert Benjamin Smith	2024-04-21	United States	Unknown	School shooter	
Victor Farrant	2024-05-03	United Kingdom	Unknown	Murderer and rapist	
John Cannan	2024-11-06	United Kingdom	Natural causes	Murderer and serial rapist	
Robert Brooks	2024-12-10	United States	Beaten to death by police officers	Musician	Sentenced in 2017 to 12 years for first-degree assault.
Walter H. Bourque Jr.	2025-01-10	United States	Natural causes	Murderer and the second longest-serving prisoner in the US	
Christopher Sepulvado	2025-02-22	United States	Natural causes	Child murderer	The oldest inmate on Louisiana's death row
Daniel Jongyon Park	2025-06-24	United States	Jumped off the balcony	Co-conspirator in bombing	Awaiting sentence and trial.
Ian Watkins	2025-10-11	United Kingdom	Stabbed to death by fellow inmate	Former Lostprophets singer and child sex offender	Sentenced in 2013 to 29 years in prison and 6 years on extended licence for multiple child sexual offences; in prison he was regularly attacked by inmates.
Faruk Fatih Özer	2025-11-01	Turkey	Unknown	Cryptocurrency trader and scammer	
Tommy Recco	2025-11-20	France	Natural causes	Serial killer	
Robert Lewis Dear Jr.	2025-11-22	United States	Natural causes	Mass shooter	
Ralph Menzies	2025-11-26	United States	Natural causes	Convicted of the murder of Maurine Hunsaker	Menzies’ execution was halted pending a competency hearing but Menzies died before he could be evaluated.
Benedetto Santapaola	2026-03-02	Italy	Diabetes	Boss of the Catania Mafia family	
Ian Huntley	2026-03-07	United Kingdom	Blunt force trauma to the head by fellow inmate Anthony Russell	School caretaker and double murderer	Sentenced in 2005 to a minimum 40-year sentence.
Michael Jackson	2026-06-06	United States	Natural causes	Murderer	

== See also ==
- Category:People who died in prison custody
- Death in custody
- Lists of people by cause of death
- Prisoner suicide
