= William Wallace (disambiguation) =

William Wallace (died 1305) was a Scottish knight, landowner, and leader during the Wars of Scottish Independence.

William Wallace may also refer to:

== Academics ==
- William Wallace (philosopher) (1844–1897), Scottish philosopher
- W. Stewart Wallace (1884–1970), Canadian historian, librarian, and editor
- William Wallace, Baron Wallace of Saltaire (born 1941), British academic, writer and politician

== Arts and entertainment ==
- William Vincent Wallace (1812–1865), Irish composer
- William Ross Wallace (1819–1881), American poet
- William Wallace (Scottish composer) (1860–1940), Scottish classical composer
- William Tracy Wallace (1880–1947), Canadian-born artist in England
- William O. Wallace (1906–1968), American set decorator
- Bill Wallace (author) (William Wallace,1947–2012), American teacher and author
- William Wallace, real name of Ali Bongo (1929–2009), British comedy magician

== Business and industry ==
- William Wallace (mason) (died 1631), Scottish master mason and architect
- Sir William Wallace (marine engineer) (1881–1963), Scottish marine engineer and businessman
- William Kelly Wallace (1883–1969), Irish railway engineer
- William Roy Wallace (1889–1983), American architect

== Law and politics ==
- William H. Wallace (1811–1879), American territorial governor and congressional delegate from Idaho Territory
- William J. Wallace (Indianapolis mayor) (1814–1894), American politician from Indiana
- William Wallace (Canadian politician) (1820–1887), Scottish-born Canadian politician in Ontario
- William A. Wallace (1827–1896), U.S. senator from Pennsylvania
- William T. Wallace (1828–1909), American lawyer and jurist in California
- William James Wallace (1837–1917), American lawyer and federal judge
- William C. Wallace (1856–1901), U.S. representative from New York
- William A. Wallace (Illinois politician) (born 1867), American politician from Illinois
- William Robert Wallace (1886–1960), American judge
- William Robert Wallace Jr., his son, member of the Oklahoma House of Representatives

== Military ==
- William A. A. Wallace (1817–1899), American Texas Ranger captain, nicknamed "Bigfoot"
- W. H. L. Wallace (1821–1862), Union general in the American Civil War
- William Henry Wallace (1827–1901), Confederate general and South Carolina state legislator
- William Miller Wallace (1844–1924), U.S. Army general
- William J. Wallace (USMC) (1895–1977), American Marine Corps aviation officer
- William S. Wallace (born 1946), general in the United States Army
- William Arthur James Wallace (1842–1902), Irish army officer and engineer in India

== Science and medicine ==
- William Wallace (mathematician) (1768–1843), Scottish mathematician
- William Wallace (surgeon) (1791–1837), Irish surgeon
- William Wallace (chemist) (1832–1888), Scottish chemist and city analyst for Glasgow
- William E. Wallace (1917–2004), American physical chemist
- William A. Wallace (organizational theorist) (born 1935), American systems scientist

== Sports ==
=== Association football (soccer) ===
- William Wallace (footballer, born 1893) (1893–1917), English footballer
- Willie Wallace (born 1940), Scottish footballer
- William Wallace (Brazilian footballer) (born 2002), Brazilian footballer

=== Other sports ===
- Billy Wallace (rugby union) (1878–1972), New Zealand rugby union player
- Bubba Wallace (William Wallace, born 1993), American racing driver
- William Middleton Wallace (1892–1915), Scotland rugby player
- William Wallace (rower) (1901–1967), Canadian Olympic rower
- Bill Wallace (American football) (1912–1993), American football player
- Bill Wallace (martial artist) (born 1945), American kickboxer
- Bill Wallace (rugby union) (William Wallace, 1905–1960), English rugby union player
- Bill Wallace (sportswriter) (William N. Wallace, 1924–2012), American sportswriter

== Other people ==
- William Wallace of Failford (died 1616) Scottish courtier
- Staker Wallace (1733–1798), United Irishman, sometimes referred to as William
- William Wallace (Jesuit) (1863–1922), Irish Jesuit priest and Indologist
- William Herbert Wallace (1878–1933), English convicted murderer, later found to be innocent on appeal
- Bill Wallace (prisoner) (William Richard Wallace, 1881–1989), Australian convicted murderer
- Billy Wallace (socialite) (William Euan Wallace, 1927–1977), British socialite

== Other uses ==
- Sir William Wallace Hotel, Australian pub in Balmain, New South Wales

== See also ==
- William Wallis (disambiguation)
- Bill Wallace (disambiguation)
- Will Wallace, American film director and actor
