= Bill Wallace =

Bill Wallace may refer to:

- Bill Wallace (American football) (1912–1993), American football player
- Bill Wallace (martial artist) (born 1945), American karateka and kickboxer
- Bill Wallace (author) (1947–2012), American author of children's books
- Bill Wallace (sportswriter) (1924–2012), American sportswriter for The New York Times
- Bill Wallace (prisoner) (1881–1989), Australian prisoner and suspected murderer, oldest recorded person in prison custody in history
- Bill Wallace (rugby union)

== See also ==
- William Wallace (disambiguation)
