= Caneva (surname) =

Caneva is a surname. Notable people with the surname include:

- Carlo Caneva (1845 – 1922), Italian general
- Dalma Caneva (born 1994) Italian wrestler
- Don Caneva (1936 – 2008), American band director, conductor, music editor
- Romano Caneva (born 1904 -?), Italian boxer
- Giovanni Battista Caneva (1904 – 1947), Italian Fascist politician, syndicalist and athlete

== See also ==
- Caneva
