= William Wallis =

William Wallis may refer to:

- William Wallis (cricketer) (1878–1939), English cricketer
- William Wallis (rugby union), Irish international rugby union player
- Bill Wallis (1936–2013), British actor and comedian

== See also ==
- William Wallace (disambiguation)
