= J Ward =

Psychiatric prison now museum in Victoria, Australia

Coordinates: 37.2788°S 142.9303°E

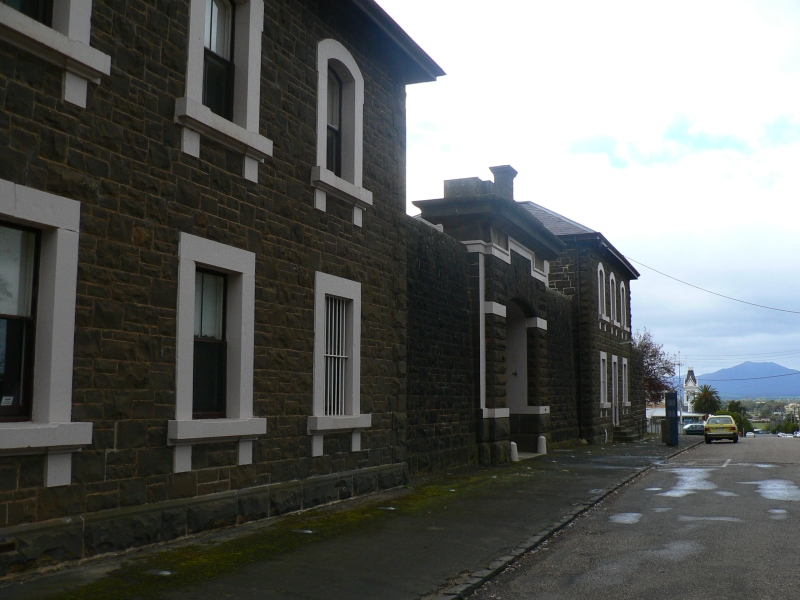
- Interactive map of J Ward
- Location: 1-7 Girdlestone Street Ararat, Victoria
- Status: closed as a prison, open for tours
- Security class: high security criminally insane
- Capacity: 52
- Opened: 10 October 1861
- Closed: January 1991 as a prison, Reopened as a museum in 1993.
- Former name: Ararat County Gaol
- Governor: Samuel Walker (original); John Gray (second governor); Henry Pinniger (third governor); George Fiddimont (fourth governor)
- Website: www.jward.org.au

J Ward, originally the Ararat County Gaol, was an Australian prison, of the latter a psychiatric facility to house the criminally insane, located in Ararat, Victoria, Australia.

Construction of the gaol commenced in 1859 and the facility was opened in October 1861. In 1887, it was converted for use as a maximum security psychiatric ward for the criminally insane. J Ward officially closed in January 1991, and in 1993, it was re-opened as a museum providing tours.

== History ==
Construction of original building commenced in 1859, as a goldfields prison, based on the Pentonville concept, by the Public Works Department. They were built out of blue stone. On 10 October 1861, the gaol was opened, with a total of 21 prisoners incarcerated. The first Governor was Samuel Walker (previously the Governor of Portland Gaol). In 1864, the gaol housed 40 prisoners, and in 1867, John Gray became the gaol's second Governor, a position that he held for ten years. On 15 August 1870, the first execution was conducted at the gaol, when Andrew Vere was hanged for the murder of Amos Cheale in January 1869. The second execution at the gaol was held on 25 September 1883, when Robert Francis Burns was hanged for the murder of Michael Quinlivan. In 1877, Henry Pinniger was appointed as the gaol's third Governor. On 6 June 1884, the gaol held its third execution, with Henry Morgan being hanged for the murder of Margaret Nolan in November 1883. In 1884, George Fiddimont became the gaol's fourth Governor, he died of a heart attack at the gaol on 14 September 1886.

In the aftermath of the Victorian gold rush the gaol was no longer required and in December 1886 the gaol building was proclaimed as the 'J Ward', part of the Ararat Lunatic Asylum.

J Ward is now a museum open to the public.

== Notable patients ==
- Charles Fossard – admitted in 1903 at age 21 and died in custody in 1974 at age 92, he was the longest serving patient at the facility as well as the longest serving prisoner in the entire world (he was incarcerated for nearly 71 years)
- Garry David – also known as Garry Webb, said to have served more time in prison than any other person in the history of the State of Victoria. David spent a total of 33 years in various institutions
- Bill Wallace – admitted in 1926 at age 44 remaining in custody until his death in 1989 at age 107. He was both the oldest patient at the facility and the oldest prisoner in the world, a record that earned him a place in Guinness World Records (a prisoner in India broke the record, in 2010).
- Mark "Chopper" Read – was transferred from Pentridge Prison in late 1978 after arranging for a fellow inmate to cut off both his ears. Read only remained in J Ward for a few months before being transferred back to Pentridge

== Executions ==
Name	Date of execution	Crime	Notes
Andrew Vere	15 August 1870	Murder	Shooting murder of Amos Cheale at St Arnaud.
Robert Francis Burns	25 September 1883	Murder	
Henry Morgan	6 June 1884	Murder	Cut throat murder 10 year old Margaret Nolan after sexually assaulting her near Panmure

== See also ==
- Aradale Mental Hospital
- HM Prison Ararat
- List of Australian psychiatric institutions
