= Fawza Falih =

Saudi Arabian woman executed for witchcraft

- فوزة فالح محمد علي
- Died: 2010
- Criminal charge: Witchcraft
- Penalty: Death

Fawza Falih Muhammad Ali (Arabic: فوزة فالح محمد علي) was a Saudi woman who made international headlines after she was condemned to death for practicing witchcraft in 2006. In April 2011, Saudi authorities reported that she had died in 2010.

In a letter dated February 13, 2008, Christoph Wilcke, a researcher with Human Rights Watch, exhorted King Abdullah bin Abdul Aziz Al Saud to halt her execution. The letter states she was sentenced to death by beheading for the crimes of witchcraft, recourse to jinn, and animal slaughter. Human Rights Watch argued that Falih should not be executed because the crime of witchcraft is not defined by Saudi law, the judges failed to ensure a fair trial, and Falih was unable to defend herself because of "significant procedural flaws throughout the trial".

On February 21, 2008, an online petition was posted by an interfaith assembly of religious leaders from numerous faith traditions, calling for a halt of the execution of Fawza Falih.

In September the Islamic Human Rights Commission (IHRC) reported that Fawza Falih was in "very bad health and is unable to stand up in her prison cell". The IHRC notes Fawza Falih was prevented from a defence at the trial, and that she was sentenced only on the basis of one man's testimony of allegedly causing him impotence. Denied access to her lawyer, a confession was extracted via 35 days of repeated beatings. The beatings were so severe she had to receive medical treatment. Fawza had to sign the offered confession by thumbprint due to her being illiterate. Although Fawza Falih had recanted her confession, and no further evidence had come forth, the Court of Appeals on September 1, 2006, upheld the decision to execute her anyway, in the name of "public interest". In April 2011, Saudi authorities reported that she had died in jail in 2010 after choking on her food.
