= William Wallace (marine engineer) =

Scottish marine engineer

Sir William Wallace CBE FRSE LLD (25 August 1881–27 May 1963) was a 20th-century Scottish marine engineer and influential businessman. He was Chairman of Brown Brothers for over 40 years, mainly involved in the technology behind ship construction rather than their design per se. He was involved with ship design and technological advancement during both world wars, but his ideas were not always successful: including the ill-fated K-class submarines.

== Life ==
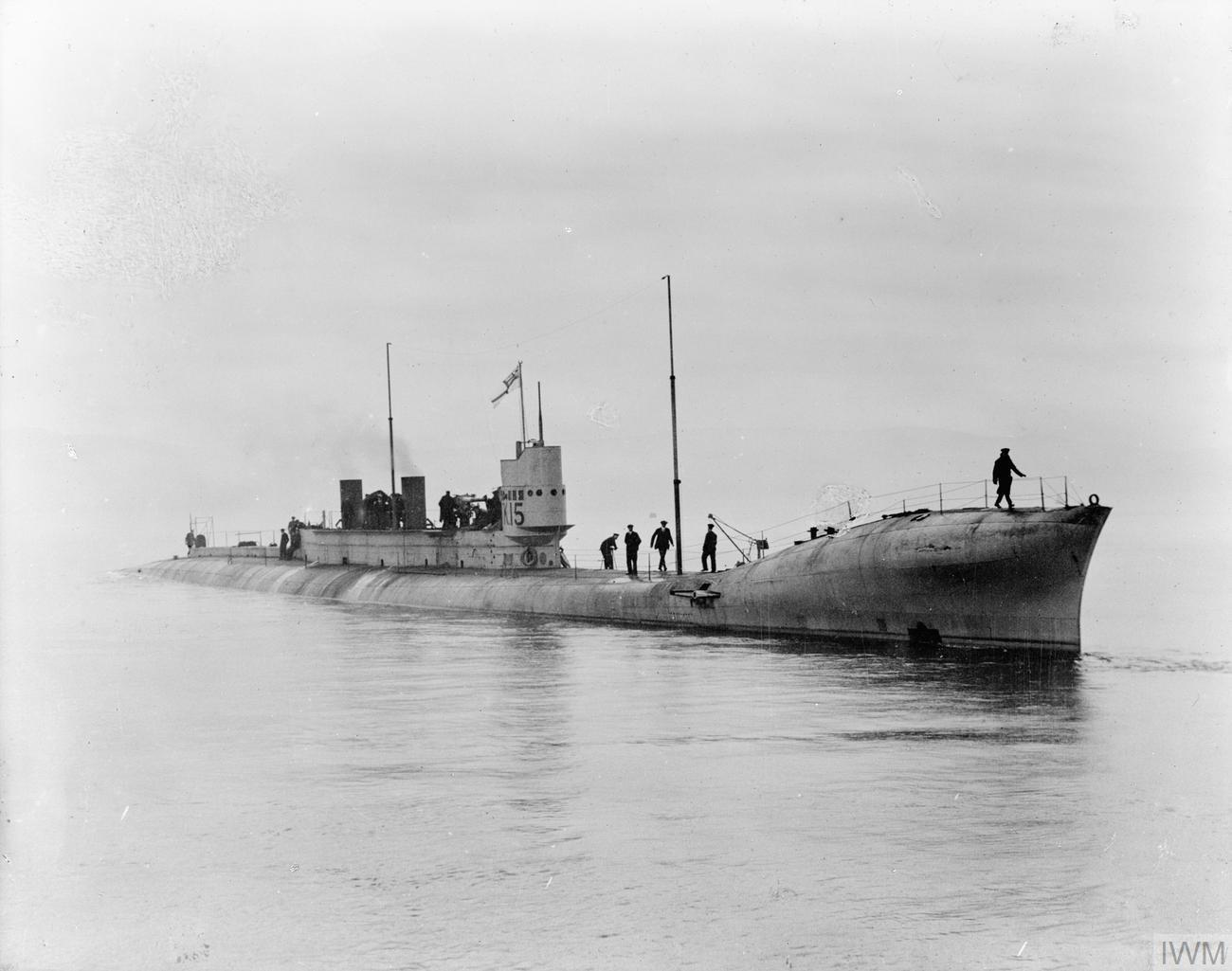
K15 by Brown Brothers

He was born in Leicester on 25 August 1881 the son of Matthew Wallace of Paisley. The family returned to Paisley in his youth and he was educated at Paisley Grammar School. From 1895 he was apprenticed as an engineer at Bow, McLachlan and Company at the Thistle Works at Abbotsinch. He also undertook formal training at Anderson College in Glasgow. He then joined the British and Burmese Steam Navigation Company as Chief Engineer.

In 1910 he joined Brown Brothers in Leith as an engineer. He originally lived in a small flat at 116 Easter Road. He rose rapidly becoming Managing Director in 1916 aged 35. He remained Managing Director until 1957 also becoming Chairman in 1947.

Considering that Brown Brothers was primarily involved in the design and creation of ship components it is unusual that their premises was not located at a dock or major river. Their huge complex stood linking Pilrig Street to Broughton Road, wrapping around Rosebank Cemetery. This is around a mile from Leith Docks. This "inconvenience" was probably the result of a ground-rent dispute, but gave them a later advantage in giving a very "secure" site in terms of new creations for warfare, commissioned by the government.

During the First World War he was involved with the design and building of the infamously ill-fated British K-class submarines. Due to this position as designer he was on board K 13 during its trials when she failed to surface during trials at the Gareloch on 29 January 1917. Thirty two people died in this incident, and 48 were rescued. Wallace's technical knowledge undoubtedly aided the survival of those rescued.

In the 1930s (with Maurice Denny) he developed the Denny-Brown stabilizer, first used on a cross-Channel ferry in 1936 and a popular choice in many Royal Navy ships during the Second World War. He was created a Commander of the Order of the British Empire (CBE) in 1944 for services to the shipbuilding industry.

He later specialised in designing steering gear for the major liners such as the RMS Queen Mary (1934) and RMS Queen Elizabeth (1938).

In 1946 he was elected a Fellow of the Royal Society of Edinburgh. His proposers were James Cameron Smail, Sir Ernest Wedderburn, Sir David Russell and John Barber Todd. He was knighted by King George VI in 1951.

In 1954 he was the second recipient of the Churchill Medal awarded to major figures of British engineering. The University of Edinburgh awarded him an honorary doctorate (LLD) in 1956.

He retired in 1959 after almost 50 years at Brown Brothers.

He died suddenly on 27 May 1963 aged 81.

== Other positions of note ==
- Director of the British Linen Bank
- Director of Alexander Cowan and Sons (papermakers)
- Director of Edinburgh Investment Trust
- Director of William Beardmore & Co
- Vice President of the Royal Institution of Naval Architects
- President of the Institute of Marine Engineers
- President of the Institute of Engineers and Shipbuilders in Scotland
- Chairman of the Edinburgh Chamber of Commerce
- Chairman of the Engineering and Allied Employers Federation

== Family ==
In 1916 he married Christina Gilchrist Stewart.
