= Ron Porambo =

American journalist

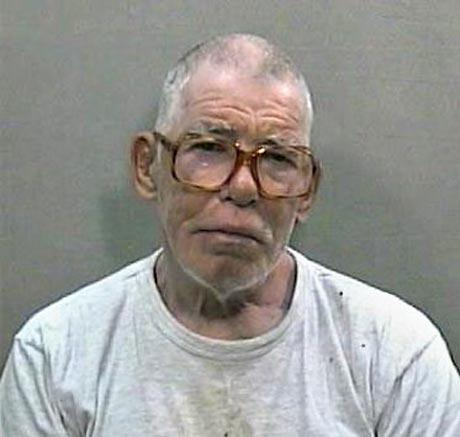
- Inmate photo of Ron Porambo shortly before his death.
- Born: November 24, 1938
- Died: October 22, 2006 (aged 67)
- Education: Rutgers University
- Occupation: Journalist
- Writing career
- Period: Long, hot summer of 1967
- Genre: New Journalism
- Notable work: No Cause For Indictment: An Autopsy of Newark (1971)

Ronald Porambo was a journalist most well known for thoroughly covering the 1967 Newark riots. He authored the book No Cause For Indictment: An Autopsy of Newark, which exposed the role of police in the violence that occurred during the riots, which left 26 people dead. Porambo became passionate about revealing the depths of institutional racism and corruption of state and local governments of New Jersey.

After the publication of his book, Porambo begin in engaging in criminal activity such as robberies, and spent the last 20 years of his life in prison for murder.

== Early life ==
Ronald Porambo was born in East Orange, NJ, on Thanksgiving Day in 1938, to Millie and Frank Porambo. The Porambos owned Franchett's, a wholesale bakery, and Frank had invented and patented a cruller twister. Due to the family business, the Porambos were quite wealthy.

Porambo's parents encouraged him to join a youth-boxing program in nearby Newark, which was run by Jack Reno, a police officer and local sports legend. Most of the young men in the gym came from Newark's poor black neighborhoods. After only a year in training, Porambo won the 1955 New Jersey Golden Gloves. Porambo became a professional boxer, landing a few big fights in his early twenties. He appeared in preliminary bouts at Madison Square Garden a couple of times in the late 1950s.

He moved away from boxing and joined the military, but that career was cut short when he strayed from his post at Fort Slocum, NY, for a midnight rendezvous with a woman he'd just met.

Porambo decided to attend Rutgers University's journalism program, later saying that it was “the only course I could conceivably pass.” It took him seven years to complete the degree.

He began working at small newspapers, holding jobs in Lorain, OH, and in Albany, NY. In Kingsport, TN, he worked for the Times-News, and one of his features won a state journalism prize. He was eager to cover topics other reporters avoided: Kingsport's black neighborhoods, drug abuse, and the city's homeless population.

=== Personal life and family ===
When he was 27, Porambo met 19-year-old Carol Scott, a black woman with a seven-month-old daughter named Glenna. Interracial marriage was illegal in Tennessee, but that did not deter the two from dating. Six months after meeting Carol, Porambo proposed. Porambo's parents opposed the marriage, and the couple moved to Albany, where they could get legally married. Porambo also adopted Glenna as his own daughter. The marriage was unusual enough that The New York Times included it in the headline of a 1972 profile of Porambo. The couple lived in many places as Porambo moved from job to job, but in the late 1960s and early 1970s, when Porambo held jobs at the Newark Star-Ledger and the Elizabeth Daily Journal, they lived in Newark. Porambo and Carol had two more children together, and they lived in a house in the Weequahic neighborhood of Newark, a middle-class, mostly black area.

In later life, Porambo became bitter due to his disillusionment with journalism and the impact of his works, leading him to become physically and emotionally abusive. When Porambo was arrested for a botched armed robbery in Toronto, his family moved back to Newark while he served his sentence.

== Journalism career ==
Porambo was a follower of the "New Journalism" style of reporting. In Albany, Porambo found work at the Knickerbocker News. Porambo strove to emulate New York City journalist Jimmy Breslin, for providing unflinching coverage of the lives of blue-collar workers, marginalized minorities, and crime lords. Porambo's independent nature led to many clashes with the newspaper's editor, and within a matter of months, he was fired.

Over the next year and a half, Porambo joined and left several newspapers, including the Morning-Journal in Lorain, OH; the Suffolk Sun in Deer Park, NY; and the Toronto Telegram. He eventually returned to New Jersey, to work at the Camden's Courier-Post. Porambo's reporting primarily covered the black slums of nearby Philadelphia and poverty.

=== Long, hot summer of 1967 ===
In 1967, racial tensions across the United States boiled over into what came to be known as the long, hot summer of 1967. Black residents took to the streets to protest police brutality, segregation, housing discrimination, and other injustices. White flight to the suburbs during the 1950s had led to the inner city populace of Newark being mostly black and impoverished. Newark retained its white-majority leadership, however, which created a situation rife with exploitation and corruption.

On July 12, 1967, a black middle-aged man named John Smith flashed the high beams of his cab and drove around a police cruiser that was blocking his lane, after which the police promptly pulled him over and arrested him. Smith was beaten severely, and residents of the Hayes Homes project across the street from the station saw it happen. This sparked angry looting throughout the night, and police director Dominick Spina advised his officers to allow the events to unfold without interference. This was a mistake, however, and the violence stretched on for days. When mayor Hugh Addonizio called in state troopers and the National Guard, he said in dismay to an arriving officer, “It’s all gone, the whole town is gone.”

After 5 days of riots, 13,319 rounds of ammunition were fired in what authorities described as a peacekeeping effort. The violence had led to the death a cop, a fireman, and 21 civilians, all shot by police or guardsmen. The authorities denied that the riots were caused by poverty, racism, and state-sanctioned violence, instead claiming the unrest was due to communist agitators, paid protestors, and criminal thugs. Porambo rejected these whitewashed version of the events.

Six months after the riots, Porambo joined the Daily Journal in the town of Elizabeth. There, he focused his works on profiles of black residents and first-hand accounts of the unrest. Porambo covered a meeting of the Newark Human Rights Commission, a community group that advocated for police reform. He listened as many witnesses detailed the injustices perpetuated by the governor, the mayor, cops, and public prosecutors, and Porambo resolved to expose it to the greater public.

Porambo began frequenting bars and pool halls, telling regulars that he wanted to tell the real story about what happened in July 1967. He began collecting accounts, which often contradicted the stories told by authorities, that he published in a series in the Daily Journal.

=== No Cause For Indictment: An Autopsy of Newark ===
The New York publishing house Holt, Rinehart, and Winston heard of Porambo's series on the riots and offered him a $7,500 advance to expand his investigation into a book. Porambo eagerly jumped on the opportunity. His 15-part series in the Daily Journal became the basis for the book, which was published in 1971.

The book was divided up into 6 sections, each dedicated to major events precipitating the start of the riots. Porambo told the stories of the 26 people killed, using first-hand accounts that often contradicted official news reports released by law enforcement or the local media. Porambo described how the killings were brought before grand juries after the riots, only for the court to rule, "Due to insufficient evidence of any criminal misconduct, the jury found no cause for indictment.”

When the book was published, Porambo became a household name in Newark. By January, publisher Holt, Rinehart and Winston had nearly sold out of the 7,500 copies of the first edition, and the book received positive reviews from The Village Voice and The New York Review of Books. A review in The New Yorker called it "probably the most moving and instructive book yet written on any of the bloody civil disturbances of the sixties." The book drew anger from the police department and the Italian-American community of Newark's North Ward, and it revealed the deeply embedded racism and graft present in both. However, no one demanded retractions or sued.

Shortly after the book was published, on December 7, seven shots were fired at Porambo from a dark sedan. On January 13, an unknown white assailant shot Porambo twice in the thigh as Porambo got into his car outside of Tony's Tavern on South Ninth Street. Newark Police Captain Rocco Paradiso was quick to write off both incidents as a publicity stunt by Porambo's publisher. After the shooting, the publisher took the opportunity to purchase an advertisement in The New York Times that proclaimed "THEY TRIED TO MURDER THE AUTHOR."

Porambo was later quoted saying, “The book was written for the sole purpose of getting a job, not to make money,” in the February 4, 1972, issue of The New York Times.

== Television career ==
The book helped him land a job as correspondent for 51st State, a nightly public television program that aired in the New York City area. However, after a botched story in which a source was revealed to be forging documents, Porambo was fired for putting the program's reputation in jeopardy with the segments that had already aired.

Porambo got a job as a field producer for City-TV in Toronto, moving his family once again. Porambo's behavior became increasingly erratic, and he began taking small payoffs from freelance correspondents at the TV station in exchange for guarantees that their clips would be broadcast. When Porambo failed to hold up his end of the bargain, the freelancers alerted executives to the scheme, and Porambo was fired once again.

== Criminal career ==
Porambo's first arrest was due to his intent to provide autopsy pictures of people killed in the riots. He attempted to bribe a police officer for photos, and was subsequently arrested. He was sentenced to 3 months in prison in 1973 for bribery. During the sentencing, the judge said, "You may have tried to root out corruption, but you stooped to corruption yourself."

Shortly after publishing his book, Porambo turned to a life of crime as a stickup artist. In 1978, Porambo mugged a Toronto airport parking attendant with a toy gun. A few days later, police tracked him down and arrested him, and Porambo was later found guilty of armed robbery. He remained in prison for 9 months before he was released and deported back to the United States.

For the next few years, Porambo alternated between journalism jobs and crime, targeting drug dealers since they were likely to have cash and unlikely to go to the police. Porambo even employed his daughter Glenna to help him case potential marks.

In June 1980, Porambo teamed up with 20-year-old Richard Norman to rob a couple using a toy gun. Porambo was sentenced to 7 years for robbery and assault and was sent to Leesburg State Prison, a medium-security lockup. Within 2 years, Porambo earned early release to a halfway house. Porambo picked up parole work at the Atlantic City Press. In January 1982, Porambo missed his nightly sign-in at the halfway house and was returned to prison for attempted escape. He was released a few months later and resumed his life of crime.

=== Davis murder ===
On April 10, 1983, Porambo worked with a team of criminals to rob a cocaine dealer Sidney Davis. As Davis was held at gunpoint in the living room, Larry Page, one of the accomplices, searched the apartment. Page came across Davis' girlfriend and raped her before bringing her to the rest of the team and demanded that Porambo shoot them both. Assuming this would be their last moments, Davis and his girlfriend attacked the assailants, and in the ensuing scuffle a shot was fired. The police found Davis bleeding from a chest gunshot wound, and he identified his shooter as a white man. Davis died within the hour, and police found a black wig, a blue fireman's hat, and a silver .32-caliber revolver with two spent cartridges at the scene.

Porambo disappeared for a few weeks, staying in southern New Jersey. He lived in fear that Davis' associates would come looking for him. However, Porambo soon returned to robbery. One month after the murder, Porambo robbed a major drug dealer named David Williams in a bold home invasion. Porambo turned over some of Williams' stolen jewelry to a dealer, who, realizing Williams would make a powerful enemy, contacted Williams to tell him how the robbery occurred.

=== Assassination attempt ===
On May 19, 1983, as Porambo waited in his car to meet a friend, a man approached his vehicle and shot him in the head with a .38-caliber handgun. Three bullets penetrated Porambo's skull, while another hit his left leg. Porambo fell forward onto the car horn, possibly startling the assailant away. A rag was later found stuffed in the car's gas tank, indicating an additional plan to set the car on fire with Porambo still inside. A 16-year-old girl who had witnessed the incident ran to call the police, and by the time they had arrived, Porambo was unconscious. He was taken to a hospital where doctors performed surgery to save his life. They were unable to remove one of the bullets from his brain, leaving Porambo with permanent speech and motor deficiencies. Porambo couldn't remember the man who shot him, but he remained in police custody while in the hospital as he had become the prime suspect in the Davis murder investigation.

=== Murder trial ===
Just before the attempt on his life, one of the four accomplices in the Davis murder was also shot dead. The remaining two had given statements to the police implicating Porambo in multiple crimes in order to protect themselves. Porambo remained a prolific writer while awaiting trial, writing so many letters to Richard Newman, the judge overseeing his case, that Newman recused himself after prosecutors voiced complaints that Porambo's extensive contact might influence the trial.

The trial began in July 1984. The prosecution focused on two letters written by Porambo that implicated himself in the murder. The police responding to the attack on Porambo also found a bag containing wigs, fake badges, and two loaded pistols. Porambo's defense relied on demonstrating the weakness of the circumstantial evidence. The defense lawyer also claimed that the charges were an attempt to silence Porambo in retaliation for No Cause for Indictment.

On October 2, 1984, a jury of 8 women and 4 men found Porambo guilty, and he was sentenced to 30 years to life. He was convicted on charges of felony murder, conspiracy to commit robbery, two counts of armed robbery, burglary, and possession of a firearm for an unlawful purpose. The jury acquitted him of charges of aggravated sexual assault and purposeful or knowing murder. Prosecutor Al Constants said he never recalled Porambo expressing remorse for robbing or murdering Davis, commenting, "He [Porambo] thought he was on some kind of high road."

== Imprisonment and death ==
The first few years passed uneventfully for Porambo, though his neurological damage caused him to deteriorate mentally. He kept in shape physically with exercise, and he had mostly benign experiences with his fellow inmates. Outside the prison, Porambo continued to alienate all friends and family. His sister-in-law, Nancy Porambo, mailed him food and books, but he became enraged if she didn't select the correct brand or author. When she sent him a typewriter he didn't like, Nancy claimed that Ron threatened to kill her and her children, and promptly cut off contact.

Porambo took a substantial blow when he found out that his daughter Rhonda slipped into a coma during routine surgery related to rheumatoid arthritis in 1989. Porambo was allowed to visit Rhonda in the hospital, and he was escorted to Rhonda's room with shackles around his wrists and ankles. During the 15 minutes he was allotted for the visit, he wept over Ronda's unmoving form, holding her as tightly as he could.

Fred Bruning, Porambo's longtime friend and one of only two guest invited to the Porambos' wedding (the other guest was Bruning's wife), was Porambo's sole friend in the outside world. The two had met when they worked together at the now-defunct Knickerbocker News. Bruning authored a chronicle of Porambo's life for Newsday Magazine in 1989.

Porambo's mental health worsened, and he was moved to a prison unit for people with permanent health problems. When speaking in sentences became difficult, he took to scribbling on a notepad. Another inmate helped him do basic tasks like tie his shoes and type.

Porambo died on October 22, 2006, by choking on an orange. He was 67 years old. Porambo had been estranged from his family for so long that officials at New Jersey State Prison looking to notify next of kin were unable to find them. Journalist Bill Taylor, who worked with Porambo at the Toronto Star, wrote Porambo's obituary, which appeared in the Star on November 8.

A few months before his death, Porambo received a letter from an editor at Melville House, a small publisher, who had come across copy of Porambo's book. The editor was so impressed with the work that he wanted to return the book to print. With the assistance of another prisoner, Porambo returned a letter accepting the offer. The book was reissued in 2007 in conjunction with the 40th anniversary of the Newark riots. The publisher marketed the book to journalism schools as a foremost example of old-fashioned street reporting.
