= Malcolm Robbins =

American serial killer (1960–2023)

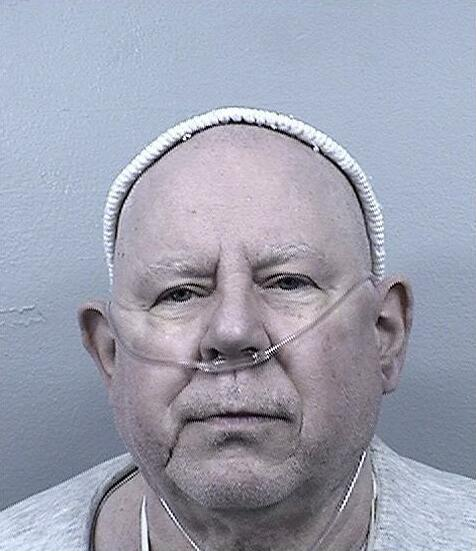
- Robbins in a 2023 prison photograph
- Born: Malcolm Joseph Robbins Jr. July 7, 1960; Rockland, Maine, U.S.
- Died: January 27, 2023 (aged 62); Corcoran State Prison, Corcoran, California, U.S.
- Convictions: California; First degree murder with special circumstances New Jersey; Murder
- Penalty: California; Death; New Jersey; Life imprisonment

Details
- Victims: 4+
- Span of crimes: 1979–1980
- Country: United States
- States: Texas, Maine, California, New Jersey (others suspected)
- Date apprehended: November 26, 1980

Malcolm Joseph Robbins Jr. (July 7, 1960 – January 27, 2023) was an American serial killer and sex offender who was convicted of raping and murdering at least three young boys and one teenager in four different states from 1979 to 1980. Convicted and sentenced to death in California, he remained on the state's death row until his death in 2023.

== Biography ==
Malcolm Joseph Robbins Jr. was born on July 7, 1960, in Rockland, Maine. Growing up in a large family with several other siblings, it was alleged that his mother had given birth to him after having sex with her older brother Donald, who was imprisoned at the time of his birth. The Robbinses lived in poverty for most of Malcolm's childhood and youth, all the while his mother worked as a waitress and occasionally prostituted herself, surviving mostly on welfare benefits.

Robbins exhibited signs of mental impairment at an early age, which manifested itself in his inability to walk until the age of three and being expelled from kindergarten for being a troublemaker. According to relatives, he was sexually abused by his mother's housemates during this period, which greatly affected his mental state. He would later be bullied at school and labeled a social outcast, and teachers would frequently complain about his refusal to communicate with others and unkempt appearance.

In 1970, a school psychologist visited the Robbins home to notify his mother about her son's worsening academic performance, but she showed little to no interest. In his report, the psychologist noted that the family members lived in squalid conditions unsuited for the development of any child. Only a year later, Robbins was expelled from school and sent to an institution for delinquent youths. After a few days at the institution, he was placed in the Pineland Hospital and Training Center in New Gloucester for observation, where he would remain for nine months.

=== Initial crimes and declining mental state ===
In 1973, Robbins was released from the institution, but was returned the following year by court order after he was caught sexually abusing two boys. In the fall of 1974, his behavior and mental state deteriorated significantly, for which he was repeatedly disciplined and imprisoned in solitary confinement, attempting suicide on at least one occasion. After undergoing psychiatric treatment for some time, he was released to his mother's custody in April 1975 but was arrested in September for another sexual assault.

After a court-appointed evaluation, Robbins was deemed insane but was again interned at the institution for delinquent youths. He remained there until August 1976, when his aunt obtained custody of him. After moving in with her and her husband (one of his mother's former roommates), Robbins took great interest in his stepfather's profession as an automechanic. He eventually learned the models of various cars, as well as how to repair them.

In October 1976, Robbins was charged with child molestation, but the charges were eventually dropped after the victim's parents made amends with Robbins on behalf of his aunt. He remained in his aunt's house but was ordered to undergo regular psychiatric treatment, much to his displeasure. From these sessions, psychiatrists concluded that he was overtly aggressive and obsessed with firearms. In June 1977, Robbins was arrested on yet another charge of sexually abusing minors but was not prosecuted and ordered to pay only a small fine.

=== Move to California ===
In early 1978, Robbins ran away from home and began several relationships with gay men. In the middle of that year, he left Maine with one of these men and moved to California, living in Palm Springs with a 40-year-old lover. In late 1979, he had another short-term relationship before moving to Los Angeles, where at a gay bar he befriended another young man who soon moved in with him and became his new partner. In June, Robbins and his boyfriend moved to Santa Barbara, where they broke up three days later after Robbins began a new relationship with an older gay man.

Around this time, he began drifting around the country, temporarily leaving California and visiting multiple states across the country in the span of a few months. Most of his friends and acquaintances described him as an infantile, pathological liar and manipulator with poor impulse control and overt hyperactivity. When he eventually returned to Los Angeles, Robbins took great interest in the activities of law enforcement, frequently claiming that he and his partner worked as undercover officers trying to catch the elusive Freeway Killer. Due to his history of lies, however, nobody took his claims seriously.

== Arrest and confessions ==
On November 26, 1980, Robbins was arrested in Millville, New Jersey, for the murder of 9-year-old Evan Bailey, who had been abducted, raped and murdered in Vineland just nine days prior. He indicated the dumping site to local authorities, and a coroner concluded that Bailey had been raped, beaten and stabbed multiple times in the neck. Robbins immediately admitted to the crime, and to the shock of the investigators, he claimed to have committed similar murders in other states.

According to his confessions, his first victim was 7-year-old Stephen Craig Little, who was killed on December 27, 1979, in Dallas, Texas. Robbins had just left California and arrived in Dallas, whereupon he lured Little - who was playing on a playground - into his van. He then raped and strangled him, dumping the body in a garbage can and setting it on fire. The victim's charred remains were found on the following morning. His testimony was considered truthful as he had shared details known only to investigators at the time. Despite this, he later recanted and claimed he had still been in Palm Springs at the time. However, he was unable to provide an alibi for the date of Little's murder, and several witnesses placed him in Dallas at the time of the crime.

The next victim was 17-year-old William Byran Lepko, who was reported missing on January 29, 1980, from Wheeling, West Virginia. Lepko's mother told police that her son had gone to a party with a man who had promised to buy his blue Chevrolet Nova. Following Robbins' arrest, the car was located, and investigators learned that the car had been registered in Robbins' name on February 4, only a couple of days after Lepko went missing. When questioned, Robbins claimed that he sexually harassed Lepko after attending the party in Durham, Maine, but the young man rebuffed him. A fight ensued, during which he stabbed Lepko in the stomach. He then attempted to bury the body but was unable to do so due to the frozen ground. Robbins said that he gave the teenager's wallet and personal items to his mother's friend, who allegedly gave him the advice of registering the car in his own name. In later investigations, Robbins revealed where he had left Lepko's body, which was found in February 1981.

Another victim proved to be 6-year-old Christopher Michael Finney, who went missing on June 15, 1980, from Isla Vista, California. A number of witnesses told police that the boy was last seen alive in the company of a young man with blond hair and wearing shorts, who took him away on a red motorcycle. Finney's skeletal remains were found three months later in a lagoon near UC Santa Barbara, and a coroner deduced that the boy had died from having his cervical vertebrae broken. Robbins himself claimed that after he had convinced Finney to get on his motorcycle, he took the boy to a wooded area and raped him. Immediately afterwards, Finney began to kick the tires of his bike, angering Robbins and prompting him to strangle the boy to death. He claimed that he had stolen some of Finney's clothes and brought them to his apartment. A few days later, he sold the motorcycle, moved out of his apartment, and left town.

In the aftermath of these confessions, police searched the apartment where Robbins and his partner lived at the time and found Finney's T-shirt, which had been given as a gift to Robbins' lover.

=== Unconfirmed and disproven victims ===
In addition to these murders, Robbins either claimed to have committed or was considered a suspect in similar killings in other states. In the fall of 1980, he said that he had killed an unidentified young boy in Minden, Nevada. The boy's body was found on November 10 and was later identified as missing Sunnyvale, CA teen, John Edward Powers, aged 15 (Douglas County Sheriff's Office, NV).

Robbins was also a suspect in the murders of 5-year-old Teresa Lynn Flores and 4-year-old Martha Joanne Mezo, whose bodies were found a in shallow grave near the Salinas River near San Miguel, California, on May 29, 1980. Investigators noted similarities between their killings and that of Finney, but after numerous interrogations, Robbins was ruled out as a suspect.

He was also briefly considered a suspect in the Atlanta Child Murders, as he had lived in the city at the time, but was eventually ruled out as a suspect.

== Trials, sentence, and imprisonment ==
A week after Robbins' arrest, a number of senior law enforcement officials from several states met to plan their strategy for prosecuting him. Ultimately, it was decided that Robbins should first be tried in New Jersey for the kidnapping and murder of Evan Bailey, followed by his extradition to California.

The New Jersey trial began in April 1981. On April 27, Robbins pleaded guilty to all charges and was sentenced to life imprisonment with a chance of parole after serving 30 years. Two years later, he was extradited to California, where he made a plea bargain with the Santa Barbara County District Attorney's Office to plead guilty to murdering Christopher Finney, in exchange for being returned to New Jersey to serve his sentence. The plea was accepted, and Robbins was sentenced to death on May 12, 1983.

Between 1983 and 1989, Robbins stood trial for the murders of Stephen Little and William Byran Lepko in their respective states of Texas and Maine, receiving convictions in both cases. In early 1989, the Attorney General of California John Van de Kamp sent a letter to the New Jersey Attorney General Peter N. Perretti Jr., requesting that Robbins be extradited so his death sentence could be carried out. As there was no legal precedent for such case at the time, Thomas Kean, the contemporary Governor of New Jersey, signed an executive order for Robbins to be extradited. The convict appealed to SCOTUS, but his complaint was dismissed as the Court found no legal basis to review his claim.

Shortly after his extradition, Robbins was contacted by the Prosecutor's Office of Pima County, Arizona, in regard to the 1979 murder of 13-year-old Robert Craig Stevens, whose body was found in the Littletown area south of Tucson. Stevens disappeared on September 30 after leaving his home on South Craycroft Road and was last seen riding his bicycle near the I-10. Two weeks after this, his decomposed body was found under a mesquite tree, with signs that he had been strangled to death. Robbins had previously mentioned traveling through the area with a man in the fall of 1979; however, Robbins refused to cooperate with investigators, leaving his involvement in the still-unsolved case unsubstantiated.

== Death ==
Robbins spent the remainder of his life on California's death row. In March 2019, Governor of California Gavin Newsom signed an executive order placing a moratorium on capital punishment in the state; additionally, he ordered all inmates removed from the San Quentin State Prison. Robbins was moved to the Corcoran State Prison not long after. His health severely declined, and he died from natural causes on January 27, 2023, aged 62. He was one of the state's longest-serving death row inmates, having spent 42 years awaiting execution.

== See also ==
- List of serial killers in the United States
