= Dmytro Yaremko =

Ukrainian Greek Catholic bishop (1879–1916)

His Grace Dmytro Yaremko
- Titular Bishop of Ostroh
- Church: Ukrainian Greek Catholic Church
- In office: 22 September 1914 – 3 October 1916
- Predecessor: New creation
- Successor: Vacant
- Other post: Vice-Rector of Lviv Theological Seminary

Orders
- Ordination: 21 August 1904 (Priest) by Andriy Sheptytskyi
- Consecration: 22 September 1914 (Bishop) by Andriy Sheptytskyi

Personal details
- Born: Dmytro Yaremko; 6 October 1879 Hayok, Austria-Hungary Empire
- Died: 3 October 1916 (aged 36) Vologda, Russian Empire

Dmytro Yaremko (Ukrainian: Дмитро Яремко; 6 October 1879 – 3 October 1916) was a Ukrainian Greek Catholic clandestine hierarch. He was an auxiliary bishop of the Ukrainian Catholic Archeparchy of Lviv and titular bishop of Ostroh from 1914 to 1916.

Born in Hayok, Austria-Hungary Empire (present day – Ukraine) in 1879 in the peasant family of the Greek-Catholics. He graduated the faculty of theology in Lviv University and was ordained a priest on 21 August 1904 for the Ukrainian Catholic Archeparchy of Lviv and served as vice-rector of the Lviv Theological Seminary. He was arrested by the Russian troops and exiled to Kiev, where on 22 September 1914 he was clandestinely consecrated to the Episcopate as auxiliary bishop. The principal and single consecrator was Metropolitan Andriy Sheptytskyi.

He died imprisoned in Vologda, Russian Empire on 3 October 1916.
