= Charles Foussard =

French-Australian prisoner (1882–1974)

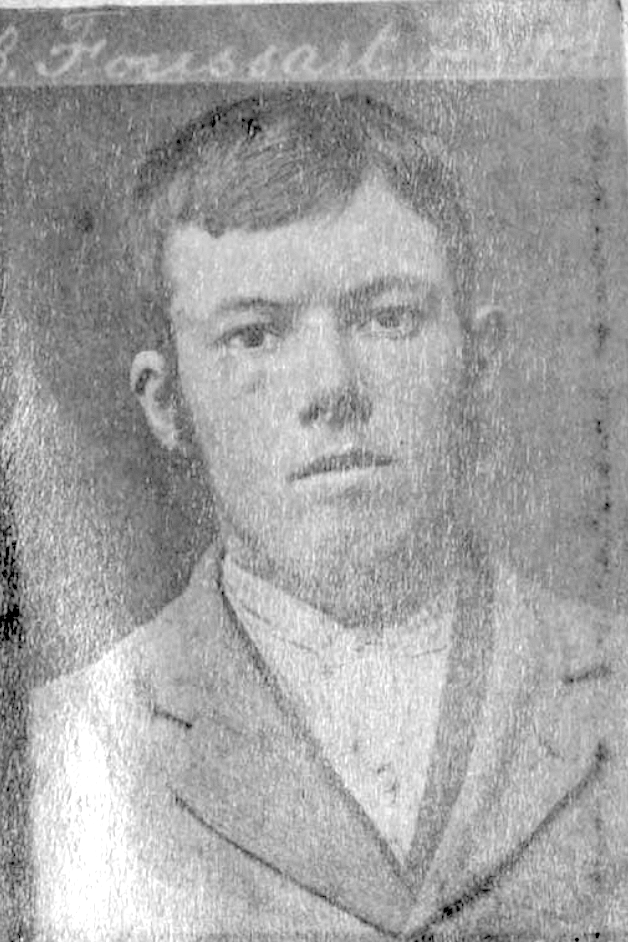
- 1903 mug shot of Foussard, spelled as "Foussart"
- Born: Charles Lucas Edmond Kindel Sidi Foussard; 1882; Nouméa, New Caledonia, French colonial empire
- Died: 1974 (aged 91–92); Ararat, Victoria, Australia
- Occupations: Ship worker, labourer, hawker
- Status: Died in custody
- Conviction: Murder
- Penalty: Committal to psychiatric care

Charles Lucas Edmond Kindel Sidi Foussard (also spelled Foussart, Fossard; c. 1882 – 1974) was a French Australian man who spent most of his life confined in the J Ward mental asylum in Ararat, Victoria, after murdering an elderly man and stealing his boots. He died while still incarcerated at 91–92 years of age, making this the longest-served prison sentence in the world with a definite end.

== Biography and imprisonment ==
Foussard was born in Nouméa, New Caledonia, French colonial empire, around 1882, and worked on ships as a young man. In 1899, he deserted his ship the St. Elizabeth while it was docked in Sydney, and spent the next few years as a vagrant, wandering around New South Wales and later to Melbourne and Adelaide, supporting himself by occasional labouring work and petty theft.

On 28 June 1903, he murdered an elderly man named William Thomas Ford in his house in Skye, Victoria, shooting him five times with a pea-rifle, and then stealing his boots and walking back to the Dandenong Ranges. Although reportedly a fairly talented bushman, he was found by police and Aboriginal trackers in possession of the distinctive boots, and charged with Ford's murder.

Under interrogation, Foussard claimed to police that he had also murdered an Indian hawker named Sultan Allem at Miners Rest, Victoria. He later withdrew parts of this claim, but when taken to the site of the murder demonstrated a good knowledge of the location, including aspects which had changed since the incident. At his committal hearing in August, government medical officer Mr J. A. O'Brien stated that Foussard was of unsound mind and prone to delusions, and was thus unfit to stand trial.

He was committed to the J Ward prison for the criminally insane in Ararat at the governor's pleasure, where he remained for the rest of his life. At his death in 1974, he had spent over 70 years in custody, making him the longest-serving prisoner in the world.
