= Guido Zingerle =

Italian murderer and suspected serial killer

- Born: 3 September 1902; Kastelbell-Tschars, South Tyrol, Italy
- Died: 9 August 1962 (aged 59); Turi, Apulia, Italy
- Other name: "The Monster of Tyrol"
- Conviction: Murder
- Penalty: Life imprisonment

Details
- Victims: 2+
- Span of crimes: 1946–1950
- Country: Italy, Austria
- States: South Tyrol, Tyrol
- Date apprehended: For the final time in August 1950

Guido Zingerle (3 September 1902 – 9 August 1962), known as The Monster of Tyrol (German: Ungeheuer von Tirol), was an Italian murderer and possible serial killer who killed at least two women in the 1940s and raped another three. In his murders, Zingerle had specially-equipped caves in the Tyrolean mountains, where he would abduct and then rape his victims. He killed by burying his victims under a pile of stones to let them die in days of agony, which he often observed. After the Second World War, he moved to Innsbruck in Austria.

== Early life ==
Zingerle was born in 1902 in Tschars in the Vinschgau Valley. His mother, a labourer, was unable to cope with the demands of raising her illegitimate child and placed him in the care of a farming family in the village of Vals in Mühlbach. Already during his time at primary school, he stood out for his violent and cruel behaviour and failed to fit in with his peers. At the age of 15, he was charged with theft for the first time and placed in a youth care home; in the years that followed, he repeatedly came to the attention of the criminal justice system.

After being conscripted into the Italian Army’s Alpini in 1923, Zingerle deserted after just one year and fled to France, where he signed a five-year contract with the Foreign Legion. In 1929, he also deserted from this post in North Africa, but was apprehended in what was then Spanish Morocco and transferred to Italy, where a court sentenced him to three years’ imprisonment for desertion. After his release in 1932, he married in Pawigl near Lana and became the father of a daughter in 1934. Shortly afterwards, he left his family and went to Abyssinia as a labourer; Italy had subjugated the region militarily in 1935. However, he returned to South Tyrol as early as 1936.

Under the terms of the South Tyrol Option Agreement between Adolf Hitler and Benito Mussolini, Zingerle chose to emigrate to the German Reich; when the war began, he was conscripted into the Wehrmacht, deserted again, but was arrested by the Gestapo in 1941 and conscripted into military service once more. In 1942, he was seriously wounded in Russia; in September 1944, he deserted again from hospital and fled to South Tyrol. In April 1945, he was captured and sentenced to death by a court-martial in Bolzano for desertion. However, due to the end of the war, the sentence was not carried out.

After the war, he settled in Innsbruck with his wife and daughter and earned a living through odd jobs, smuggling and selling newspapers. He would regularly be away from home for days or weeks at a time; he explained these absences to his wife as mountain hikes.

== Murders ==
Zingerle's first confirmed victim was the young teacher Gertrud Kutin (sister of Helmut Kutin, Honorary Director of the SOS Children's Villages) from Bolzano, whom he kidnapped in Glaning in May 1946. He raped and then buried her under heavy stones until she died several days later. The body was not found until April 1947.

In July 1946, he raped a 15-year-old girl near Karneid and walled her up in a rock niche. However, the girl managed to free herself.

In June 1947, two women reported him for having held them captive and raped them for several days in a cave in the Zillertal; he was sentenced to one year’s imprisonment.

In July 1950, Zingerle raped and murdered 42-year-old English tourist Helen Anne Munro, daughter of British university rector John Arthur Ruskin Munro, in the Iss valley on the eastern slope of the Patscherkofel.

== Arrest and detention ==
In August 1950, after five weeks of prosecution by the police from both North and South Tyrol, Zingerle was apprehended in an alpine hut near Vals in Mühlbach. He confessed in his first interrogation. After trials in Bolzano and Innsbruck, he was sentenced to multiple counts of life imprisonment. In a psychiatric report, he was described, among other things, as a “socially destructive, instinct-driven individual” („gesellschaftsfeindlicher Triebmensch“ in German).

On 9 August 1962 Zingerle died from liver cancer in the Turi prison.

== Aftermath ==
Guido Zingerle was known as the epitome of evil in the region for decades, with parents often using the educational formula "If you are not good, then Zingerle will get you." against rebellious children.

On the Patscherkofel, a memorial cross marks the spot where Helen Munro was murdered by Zingerle. Her grave at the Westfriedhof cemetery in Innsbruck is tended by volunteers.

In 2010, the play "Gemma Zingerle schaugn" was premiered in Absam, by author Gertraud Lener. It's about the last minutes of the murderer in his cell, in which he meets death and is confronted by his deeds. In 2015, the play "Fliegende Hitzen", written by Lorenz Gutmann and Veronika Eberl, was premiered at the Tyrolean folk plays in Telfs. With dark humour included, Zingerle's life story is retold.

In the 40-minute feature film Zingerle, directed by Eric Marcus Weglehner, Roland Silbernagl plays the role.

== Literature ==
- Heinrich Schwazer: Der Zingerle: Geschichte eines Frauenmörders. Raetia, Bolzano 2002, ISBN 88-7283-181-4.
- Artur Oberhofer: Die großen Kriminalfälle: Der Frauenmörder Zingerle - Die Geschichte des Ungeheuers von Tirol, ISBN 978-88-88396-12-5

== See also ==
- List of serial killers by country
