= Killing of Daniela Figueredo =

Venezuelan woman killed in 2021

- Born: c. 2001
- Died: 13 March 2021; Guatire, Venezuela
- Cause of death: Gunshot

Daniela Geraldine Figueredo Salazar (c. 2001-13 March 2021) was a Venezuelan young woman detained in a police cell in the Zamora municipality, Miranda state. Figueredo was killed while in state custody, shot by a police officer in the prison cell. The officer, Daniel Galarraga, has maintained that the death was accidental, but testimony from other inmates indicates that it occurred after Galarraga drew his service weapon to force her to have sexual relations with him. Galarraga was subsequently arrested and charged; the charges filed by the prosecution ruled out that it was an accidental shooting. National Assembly deputies, activists and human rights defenders denounced her killing.

== Killing ==
Figueredo had been arrested in October 2020, accused of possession of strategic material, and detained in El Helicoide.

She was killed on 13 March 2021, at the age of nineteen, by police officer Daniel Galarraga when he was handling her regulation weapon inside the cell, a Pietro Beretta pistol model 92FS, and shot her in the face. She was taken to the Eugenio Bellard General Hospital in Guatire, where she arrived without vital signs.

The NGO Una Ventana a la Libertad (A Window to Freedom), which defends the rights of detainees, stated that the incident occurred when the officer tried to sexually abuse her. The organization collected testimonies of six female inmates who were in the cell, who denounced that they are "harassed and forced to have sexual relations" with police officers in exchange for benefits. They also provided the information to the forensic police officers of the Scientific, Criminal and Criminalistic Investigations Corps (CICPC).

National Assembly deputies, activists and human rights defenders began to prepare a report on the killing to be sent to the United Nations High Commissioner for Human Rights, Michelle Bachelet, to the Office of the Rapporteur for Detained Persons of the Inter-American Commission on Human Rights, a body that Venezuela left in 2013. Deputy Marianela Fernández described the fact as "abominable", asserting that the rape of female inmates in Venezuelan prisons "has become the practice of many police officers". The deputies issued the statements during a session of the Delegated Commission, a body that is activated when the parliament goes into recess, but which Juan Guaidó put in place to remain at the head of the legislature after the 2020 parliamentary elections.

Officer Daniel Alexander Galarraga Ortega, 24 years old and having graduated three months before, was arrested subsequently and charged with intentional homicide for futile and ignoble motives, improper use of an organic weapon, sexual violence and treason. Galarraga alleged that the death was accidental when the pistol was unintentionally discharged. The prosecution ruled out that it was an accidental shooting with the filed charges. Una Ventana a la Libertad reported that the hearing for the presentation of the officer was held on the night of 17 March, after being deferred due to delays in the ballistic tests that were to be annexed to the file. Figueredo was shot in the nasal region and exited through the right occipital region, which calls into question the police officer's version. During the investigation, CICPC officers have looked after elements that link Galarraga and other officers with sexual abuse of female detainees in exchange for granting them certain benefits. According to statements made by several of those questioned, there were agreements between police officers and female detainees where they were taken out of their cells at night to have sexual relations with police officers, including some detainees at the police headquarters.

== See also ==
- María Lourdes Afiuni
