= Bill Wallace (rugby union) =

- Full name: William Wallace
- Born: 25 April 1905
- Died: 22 August 1960 (aged 55)
- School: Giggleswick School

Rugby union career
- Position: Three-quarter
International career
Years	Team	Apps	(Points)
1924	British Lions	1	(0)

William Wallace (25 April 1905 – 22 August 1960) was an English international rugby union player.

A three-quarter, Wallace played his club rugby for North Shields club Percy Park, which utilised him primarily on the right wing. He was a Northumberland representative player and in 1924 toured with the British Lions to South Africa, where he counted a Test match amongst his eight appearances. After putting five tries past Griqualand West, playing as a centre, Wallace made the team for the 1st Test match against the Springboks at Durban, slotting in on a wing.

Wallace was manager of Granville Colliery in Derbyshire.

== See also ==
- List of British & Irish Lions players
