= Bill Wallace (author) =

American teacher and children's writer (1947–2012)

William Wallace (August 1, 1947 – January 30, 2012) was an American teacher and later an author of children's books. He started writing to quiet down his fourth grade students, who loved his stories and encouraged him to make "real" books.

== Personal life and career ==
Wallace was born and raised in Chickasha, Oklahoma. He studied professional writing at the University of Oklahoma. He then got a B.S. in Elementary Education from The University of Science and Arts of Oklahoma in 1971 and an M.S. in Elementary Administration from SWOSU in 1974. He started teaching in 1971, and became the principal/P.E. teacher at Southwest Elementary in Chickasha in 1977. The school is now named The Bill Wallace Early Education Center. Wallace left the school system in 1988 to pursue writing. He wrote a total of 31 books, seven of which he wrote with his wife Carol.

== Death ==
Bill Wallace died from lung cancer on January 30, 2012. He is buried in Rose Hill Cemetery in Chickasha, Oklahoma.

== Writings for children ==
- A Dog Called Kitty (1980)
- Trapped in Death Cave (1984)
- Shadow on the Snow (1985) published as Danger on Panther Peak (1987)
- Ferret in the Bedroom, Lizards in the Fridge (1986)
- Red Dog (1987) reprinted, Aladdin (2002)
- Beauty (1988)
- Danger in Quicksand Swamp (1989)
- Snot Stew (1989)
- The Christmas Spurs (1990)
- Totally Disgusting (1991)
- The Biggest Klutz in the Fifth Grade (1992)
- Buffalo Gal (1992)
- Never Say Quit (1993)
- Blackwater Swamp (1994)
- True Friends (1994)
- Watchdog and the Coyotes (1995)
- Journey into Terror (1996)
- The Final Freedom (1997)
- Aloha Summer (1997)
- The Backward Bird Dog (1997)
- Upchuck and the Rotten Willy (1998)
- Upchuck and the Rotten Willy: The Great Escape (1998)
- The Flying Flea, Callie, and Me (1999)
- Eye of the Great Bear (1999)
- That Furball Puppy and Me (1999)
- Upchuck and the Rotten Willy: Running Wild (2000)
- Coyote Autumn (2000)
- Chomps, Flea, and Gray Cat (That's Me!) (2001)
- Goosed! (2002)
- Bub Moose (2002)
- Bub, Snow, and the Burly Bear Scare (2002)
- Skinny-Dipping at Monster Lake (2003)
- The Meanest Hound Around (2003)
- No Dogs Allowed! (2004)
- The Pick of the Litter (2005)
- The Legend of Thunderfoot (2006)
- The Dog Who Thought He Was Santa (2009) The latest and last of his books.

== Awards ==
- 1983 Oklahoma Sequoyah Children's Book Award (A Dog Called Kitty)
- 1983 Texas Bluebonnet Award (A Dog Called Kitty)
- 1985 Nebraska Golden Sower Award (A Dog Called Kitty)
- 1989 Utah Children's Book Award (Trapped in Death Cave)
- 1989 Nebraska Golden Sower Award (Ferret in the Bedroom, Lizards in the Fridge)
- 1989 South Carolina Children's Book Award (Ferret in the Bedroom, Lizards in ...)
- 1990 Florida Sunshine State Children's Book Award grade 6–8 (Trapped ...)
- 1991 Texas Bluebonnet Award (Danger on Panther Peak)
- 1991 Oklahoma Sequoyah Children's Book Award (Beauty)
- 1991 Kansas William Allen White Award (Beauty)
- 1991 Wyoming Soaring Eagle Award (Trapped in Death Cave)
- 1992 Texas Bluebonnet Award (Snot Stew)
- 1992 Pacific Northwest Territory Award (Danger in Quicksand Swamp)
- 1992 South Carolina Children's Book Award (Snot Stew)
- 1994 Maryland Children's Book Award Intermediate Level (Danger in Quicksand...)
- 1995 Connecticut Nutmeg Children's Choice Award (Biggest Klutz in Fifth Grade)
- 1995 Arizona Children's Choice Book Award (Totally Disgusting)
- 1996 Florida Sunshine State Children's Award (Blackwater Swamp)
- 1997 Utah Children's Book Award (Watchdog and the Coyotes)
- 1997 Wyoming Indian Paintbrush Book Award (Watchdog and the Coyotes)
- 2000 Arrell M. Gibson Lifetime Achievement Award -OK Center for the Book
- 2004 Maryland Children's Book Award Intermediate Level (Goosed)
- 2006 Wyoming Indian Paintbrush Book Award (No Dogs Allowed)
