= Giovanni Battista Caneva =

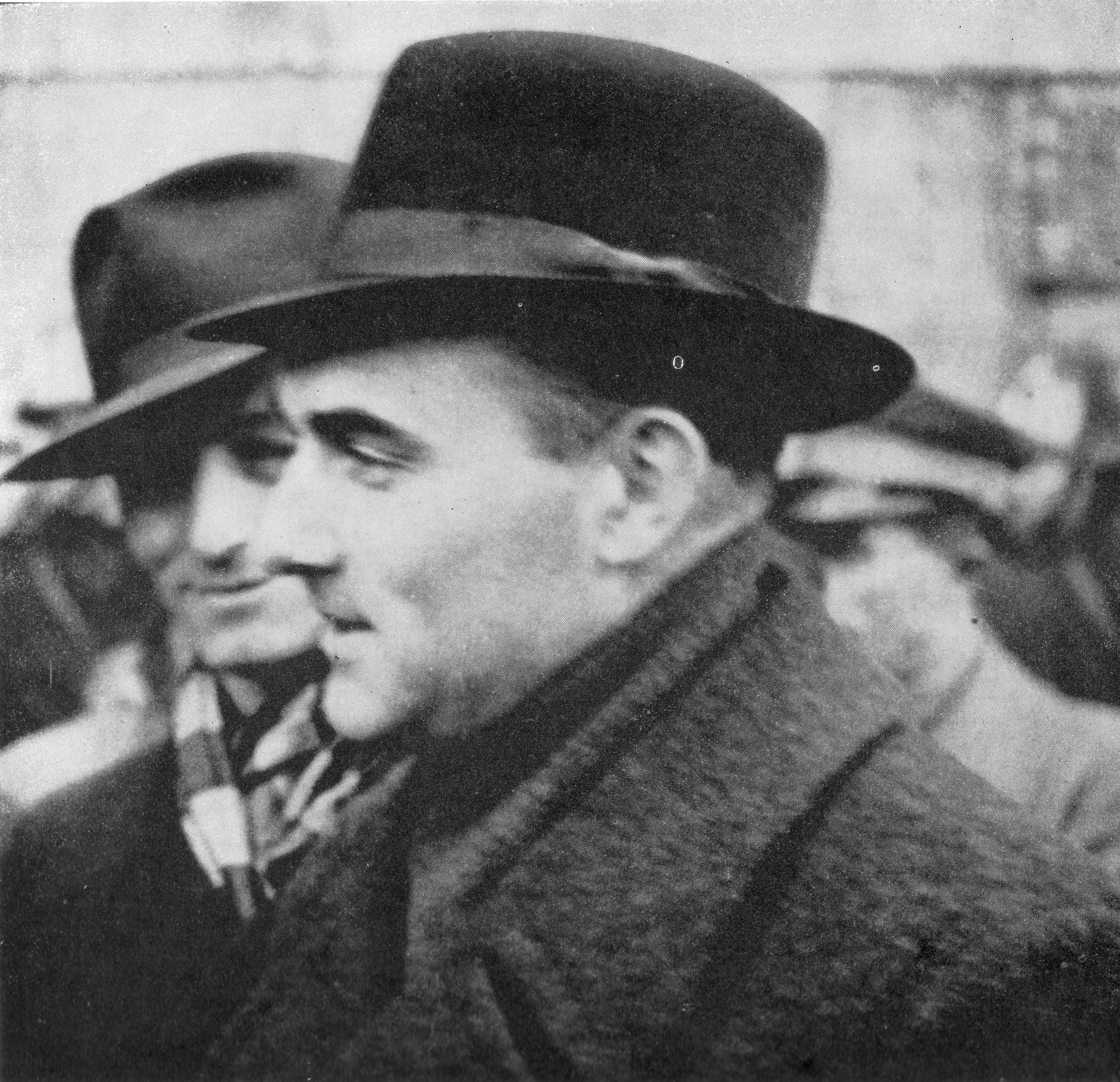

Federal Secretary of the Republican Fascist Party of Vicenza
- In office 12 November 1943 – June 1944
- Preceded by: Bruno Mazzaggio
- Succeeded by: Innocenzo Passuello

Prefect of the Province of Reggio Emilia
- In office 15 October 1944 – 25 April 1945
- Preceded by: Almo Vanelli
- Succeeded by: Vittorio Pellizzi

Personal details
- Born: 16 September 1904 Asiago, Kingdom of Italy
- Died: 12 March 1947 (aged 42) Portoferraio, Italy
- Party: National Fascist Party; Republican Fascist Party

Military service
- Allegiance: Kingdom of Italy; Italian Social Republic
- Branch/service: Guardia Nazionale Repubblicana
- Rank: Second Lieutenant
- Battles/wars: World War II; Italian Civil War

Giovanni Battista Caneva (Asiago, 16 September 1904 – Portoferraio, 12 March 1947) was an Italian Fascist politician, syndicalist and athlete. He was federal secretary of the Republican Fascist Party of Vicenza and head of the province of Reggio Emilia during the Italian Social Republic.

== Biography ==
The son of Pietro Caneva and Caterina Rodighiero, he was a squadrista in his youth, and in 1922 he took part in the march on Rome. During the Fascist regime he served for a long time trustee of the "Italo Balbo" Fascist Group in the San Bortolo district of Vicenza. He was also a syndicalist and head of the Trade Union Office of the Vicenza Federation and wrote for various magazines, including Critica fascista.

A professional ski jumper, in 1937 he won the bronze medal in the Italian Ski Jumping Championship. He was awarded the Order of the Crown of Italy.

At the time of the proclamation of the armistice of Cassibile, on 8 September 1943, Caneva was near Rome, where he immediately sided with the Germans and enlisted in the volunteer units continuing the war alongside Nazi Germany. Returning to Vicenza in October, he joined the Italian Social Republic, where he became leader of the extremist faction of the local PFR, made up of the former squadristi, opposing local PFR federal secretary Bruno Mazzaggio, whom he considered too lukewarm. On 12 November 1943 Caneva was appointed federal secretary of the Republican Fascist Party of Vicenza, replacing Mazzaggio; at the same time he joined the Republican National Guard with the rank of second lieutenant. As federal secretary, he opened up to the representatives of the most intransigent wing of Fascism and replaced the more moderate elements. At the same time, in November 1943 he held two secret meetings with local representatives of the underground Italian Communist Party, trying to enlist their support for his Fascist syndicalist policies, but without success. Despite failing to obtain the support of the workers, Caneva started a campaign for the socialization of some companies (Tramvie Vicentine, Società Autoservizi Petroli Affini, I.V.E.M., Fornaci Venete), meeting opposition from both the local entrepreneurs and the Germans.

After the killing by the partisans of his uncle Alfonso Caneva, a former squadrista, he switched to more intransigent positions. As federal secretary, Caneva also commanded the local political police squads, which were soon disbanded due to their excesses; they were grouped together in the newly formed "Company of Death", whose members included Caneva's brothers Fausto, Duilio and Giacinto.

On 5 May 1944 Aldo and Gerardo Tagliaferro, brothers of the Archpriest of Schio, monsignor Girolamo Tagliaferro, close to the Resistance, were murdered by members of the "Company of Death" in retaliation for the wounding of two fascists in Campiglia dei Berici on the previous day. On 8 June the "Company of Death", after having infiltrated the partisans, managed to capture seven of them in a cottage near Grancona, where they were then tortured to death. In June 1944 Caneva was replaced by Innocenzo Passuello at the head of the PFR of Vicenza.

On 15 October 1944 he was appointed head of the Province of Reggio Emilia. Shortly after he had taken office, the Black Brigade of Reggio Emilia crossed over to Collecchio, in the nearby province of Parma, to pursue a partisan group that had captured a truck loaded with petrol. The Brigade occupied the "Ferlano" estate of Prince Carrega, where they arrested thirteen anti-fascists and seized the goods present in their homes. The German military command intervened and ordered the restitution of the seized assets and the release of those arrested; additionally, Antonino Cocchi, head of the Province of Parma, protested to Caneva for interference in his jurisdiction and demanded the restitution of all the seized assets. Caneva had to apologize to his colleague and to return everything that had been expropriated.

On 3 February 1945 Caneva ordered the execution of four captured partisans in retaliation of a GAP attack that had resulted in the wounding of five policemen in the city centre of Reggio Emilia. On 14 February, ten anti-fascists and the acting mayor of Bagnolo in Piano were executed in reprisal for the killing by the partisans of two soldiers of the 1st Bersaglieri Division "Italia".

After the Allied breakthrough on the Gothic Line on 22 April 1945, Caneva joined the fascist column retreating from Reggio Emilia led by Lieutenant Colonel Anselmo Ballarino and reached Cremona, where he expressed to some the intention to abandon the column, along with other Venetians, in an attempt to return to Vicenza. In the end, however, he remained with the column, which at its departure from Cremona was joined by another column led by Roberto Farinacci. On 27 April Caneva was captured by the partisans.

Although he was suspected of being the instigator of the killing of the Tagliaferro brothers and of being responsible for the Grancona massacre, the proceedings were canceled and Caneva was tried in Reggio Emilia solely for the reprisal of 3 February 1945. He remained in custody in the Servi prison in Reggio Emilia where he was repeatedly beaten, until in July 1946 he was sentenced to thirty years in prison for collaborationism and murder. Jailed in Portoferraio, he died a few months later as a result of the mistreatment suffered after his capture.
