= Bill Wallace (prisoner) =

Australian convicted murderer (1881–1989)

William Richard Wallace
- Born: August 1881; Young, New South Wales, Australia
- Died: 17 July 1989 (aged 107); Aradale Mental Hospital Ararat, Victoria, Australia
- Status: Deceased
- Conviction: Murder
- Penalty: Life imprisonment

Details
- Date: December 1925
- Country: Australia
- State: Victoria
- Location: Ararat Gaol (J Ward)
- Date apprehended: 1926

William Richard Wallace (August 1881 – 17 July 1989) was an Australian convicted murderer who spent most of his life in the J Ward facility for the criminally insane in Ararat, Victoria. At his death, aged 107, he was the oldest prisoner in recorded history.

He was previously cited by Guinness World Records as the oldest prisoner in the world, however, his record was surpassed by an Indian Hindu priest named Brij Bihari Pandey who was released from the Gorakhpur Prison in Uttar Pradesh in June 2011 aged 108.

== Biography ==
Wallace was born in Young, New South Wales in August 1881, to Alexander and Walterina (née Young) Wallace.

In 1926, he was arrested in connection for the shooting death of an American man named William Ernest Williams at the Waterloo Café in King Street, Melbourne. It was alleged that Wallace had been angry at the man for refusing to stop smoking inside the café and waited outside for him to leave before fatally shooting him.

Two separate doctors declared him to be insane and unfit to stand trial; he was subsequently sentenced to J Ward at the governor's pleasure.

He was apparently happy living in J Ward, always wore a suit which was bought annually from a tailor in Ararat, and spent his time playing chess and smoking. However, he was also known for occasionally becoming violent and injuring fellow prisoners.

Publicity of his 100th birthday in 1981 led to a petition for his release, which was eventually granted. However, he refused to leave, allegedly responding with the words "Don't be fucking silly, I live here."

Around this time, he was moved to the geriatric ward of Aradale Mental Hospital, where he spent the last years of his life, before dying on 17 July 1989, only a few weeks short of his 108th birthday. He was buried at Ararat Cemetery.

== Literature ==
- Gideon Haigh: Who is Wallace?, Archives Liberation Front, 2025, ISBN 9780646726922
- Graeme Burgin: The J Ward Story, Friends of J Ward Inc., 2002, revised edition 2009
