= Peter Chelishchev =

18th century Russian ethnographer

Peter Ivanovich Chelishchev
- Born: August 14, 1745; Smolensk Governorate
- Died: September 25, 1811 (aged 66); Saint Petersburg
- Occupations: Writer, ethnographer

Peter Ivanovich Chelishchev (Russian: Пётр Иванович Челищев); August 14, 1745 – September 25, 1811) was a Russian writer, ethnographer, traveler from the Chelishchev family.

== Biography ==
Peter Chelishchev was born on August 14, 1745, in the Smolensk province; was a second cousin to Senator Alexei Chelishchev. He had a brother Alexei, three of whose grandchildren rose to the rank of general (including Nikolai Chelishchev).

Since 1757 he studied at the Moscow University Gymnasium. He graduated from the Page Corps in 1766. Then he was sent together with Alexander Radishchev and other pages to complete his education at the University of Leipzig, where he stayed from 1766 to 1770. Here he attended lectures on philosophy, sociology and physiology of Professor Ernst Platner.

Upon his return from abroad, his service did not work out. On October 11, 1773, he was assigned to the Kurinsky Infantry Regiment. On May 18, 1774, he was transferred as lieutenant to the Life Guards Grenadier Regiment. On October 9, 1778, he submitted a report on the transfer to the Arkhangelsk Infantry Regiment, but in 1790 he retired with the rank of second major. He lived in Saint Petersburg, brought his estates (1100 souls of peasants) to an upset state (in 1798 it was taken away for debt). In 1773 he was a member of the Masonic Muz Lodge, which was led by Ivan Elagin. On the recommendation of the same Elagin, he was consecrated to the degree of a master freemason in the Urania Lodge, of which Alexander Radishchev was a member at the same time.

His materials served as the basis for writing some chapters of "Journey from Saint Petersburg to Moscow". Pyotr Chelishchev was considered an accomplice of Alexander Radishchev in the compilation of his famous book "Journey from Saint Petersburg to Moscow", but, on the basis of the unprovenness of the prosecution, he escaped prosecution.

In 1791 he traveled to the north of Russia (in the Olonets, Arkhangelsk, Vologda and Novgorod Governorates). There he collected material on history and ethnography, which he combined in the book "Traveling to the North of Russia in 1791", published in 1886 and 1889 (in 1889 it was published by the Society of Ancient Writing edited by Leonid Maykov). Despite the brevity of the presentation, the facts communicated by him, especially concerning the state of trade and industry, the spread of latrines and handicrafts, are of great historical significance.

In addition to "Traveling to the North of Russia in 1791", he wrote the "Message to the Russian Academy", which contains a collection of a large number of North Russian provincialisms, and the Russian translation of the German dramatic cantata: "Feliza, Mutter der Völker", which appeared in Saint Petersburg in 1793 (printed along with "Traveling to the North of Russia in 1791").

At the end of his life he became blind, died in poverty. He was buried at the Lazarevskoe Cemetery of the Alexander Nevsky Lavra in Saint Petersburg (now the first section of the 18th century Necropolis).

== Works ==
- Message to the Russian Academy – Saint Petersburg, 1793
- Feliza, Mutter der Völker / translated from German by Peter Chelishchev – Saint Petersburg, 1793
- Traveling to the North of Russia in 1791 – Saint Petersburg, 1886

== Sources ==
- Petr Ivanovich Chelishchev // Brockhaus and Efron Encyclopedic Dictionary: in 86 volumes (82 volumes and 4 additional) – Saint Petersburg, 1890–1907
- Alexander Pypin. The Newly Opened Writer // Herald of Europe – 1886, No.10
- Mikhail Belyavsky. Peter Chelishchev and His "Journey Through the North of Russia" // Bulletin of Moscow State University – 1956, No.2
- Abel Startsev. University Years of Radishchev. Moscow, 1956. Page 8
- Alexander Tatarintsev. Alexander Radishchev. Archival Searches and Finds. Izhevsk, 1984. Pages 113–122
- Andrey Serkov. Russian Freemasonry. 1731–2000 years. Encyclopedic Dictionary – Moscow: Russian Political Encyclopedia, 2001
- Sergey Grigoryev (1973). Biographical Dictionary. Natural Science and Technology in Karelia. Petrozavodsk: Karelia. p. 237.
