= Katorga =

System of penal labor in the Russian Empire and the Soviet Union

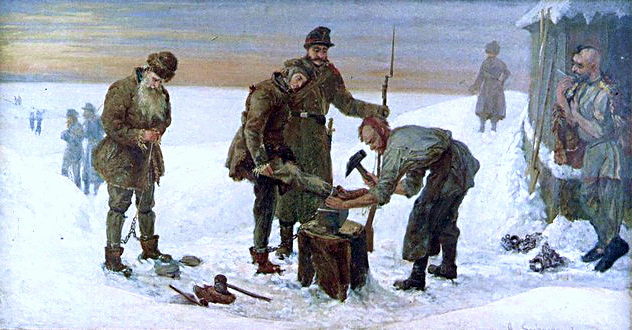
Removing of shackles, painting by Aleksander Sochaczewski (1843–1923)

Katorga (Russian: ка́торга, romanized: kátorga, IPA: [ˈkatərɡə]; from medieval and modern Greek: κάτεργον, romanized: kátergon, lit. 'galley'; and Ottoman Turkish: کادیرغا, kadırga) was a system of penal labor in the Russian Empire and the Soviet Union (see Katorga labor in the Soviet Union).

Prisoners were sent to remote penal colonies in vast uninhabited areas of Siberia and the Russian Far East where voluntary settlers and workers were never available in sufficient numbers. The prisoners had to perform forced labor, often in harsh conditions.

== Etymology ==
The term "katorga" (Russian: ка́торга) originated from the Ottoman Turkish word "kadırga," which means "galley" (a type of ship). This transition reflects the historical practice where, among others, Ukrainian and Russian slaves, were subjected to severe penal labor on galleys or in similar harsh conditions. In the Crimean Khanate and the Ottoman Empire, the practice of forcing slaves to work on galleys was common and the suffering endured by these individuals was often depicted in Ukrainian dumas (songs).

In the Russian language, "katorga" evolved to denote a form of penal labor or a harsh prison system, transcending its initial maritime connotation. This semantic shift underscores the extreme nature of the punishment associated with "katorga," which became synonymous with "prison" in Russian parlance, reflecting the severe conditions faced by those condemned to such labor.

== History ==
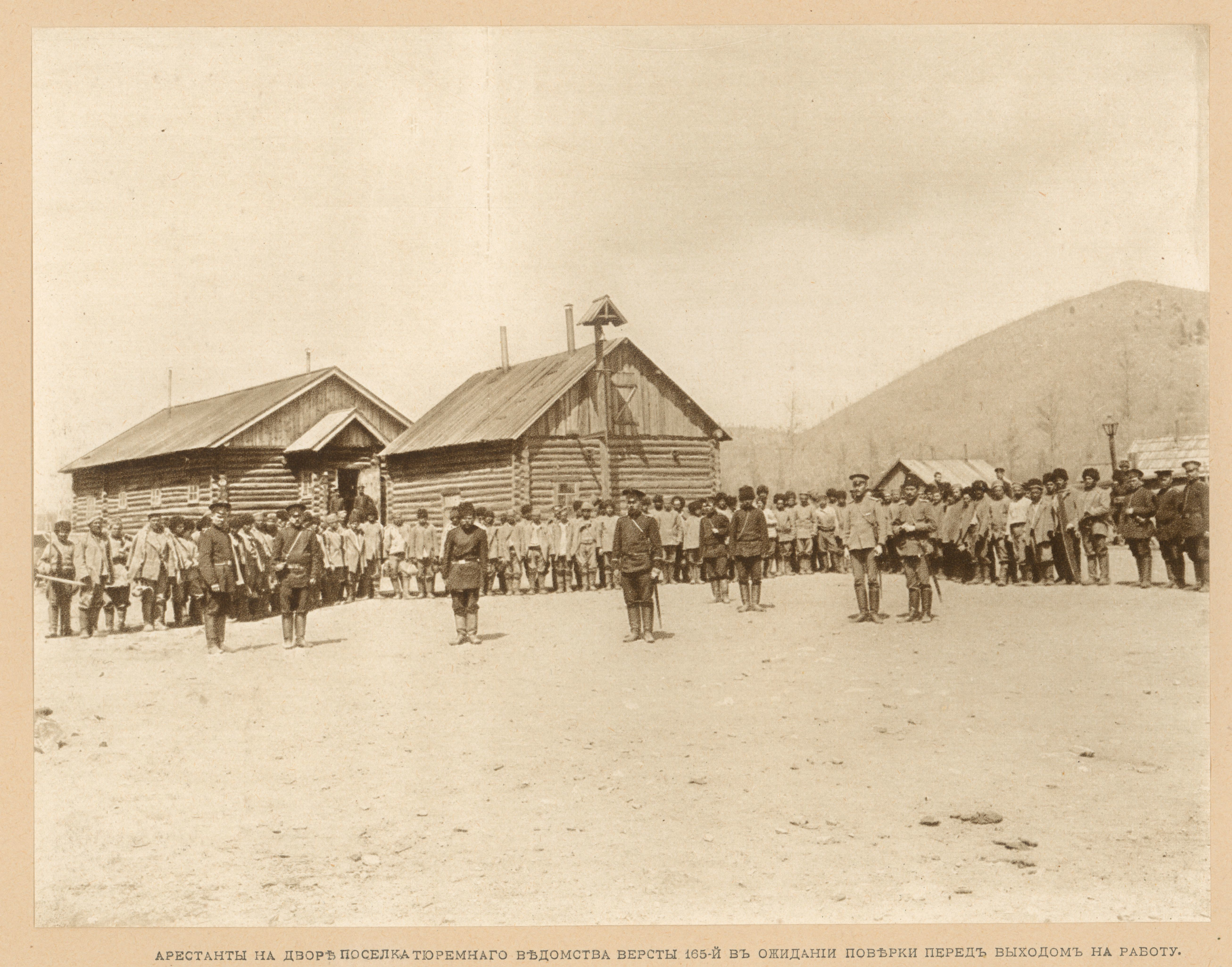
Prisoners at an Amur Cart Road camp, between 1908 and 1913

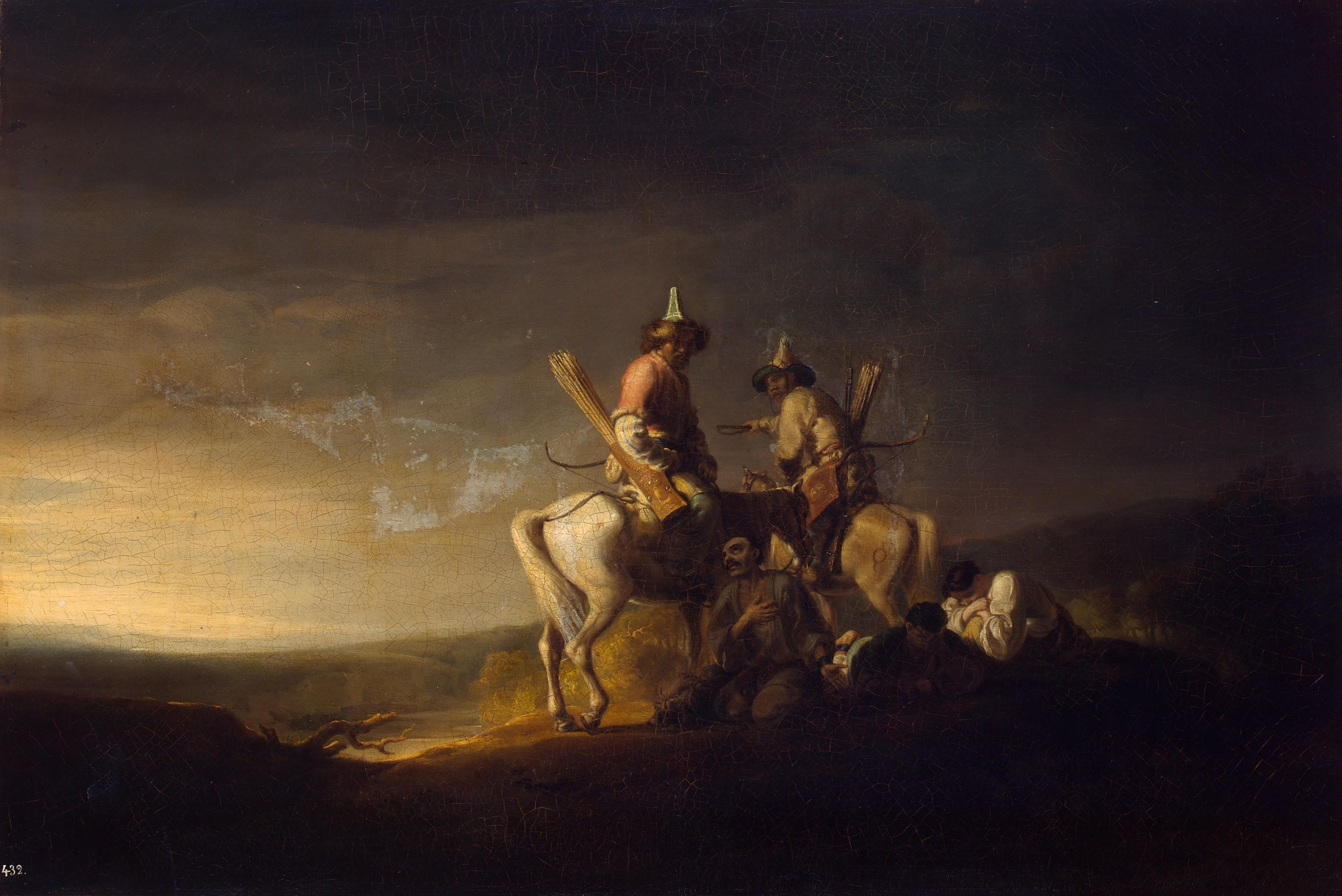
Bashkirs conducting convicts to Siberia, painted by William Allan, 1814

Katorga, a category of punishment within the judicial system of the Russian Empire, had many of the features associated with labor-camp imprisonment: confinement, simplified facilities (as opposed to prisons), and forced labor, usually involving hard, unskilled or semi-skilled work.

Katorga camps were established in the 17th century by Tsar Alexis of Russia in newly conquered, underpopulated areas of Siberia and the Russian Far East—regions that had few towns or food sources. Despite the isolated conditions, a few prisoners successfully escaped to populated areas. From these times, Siberia widely gained its reputation as a place of punishment.

After the change in Russian penal law in 1847, exile and katorga became common punishments for participants in national uprisings within the Russian Empire. This led to increasing numbers of Poles sent to Siberia for katorga. These people have become known in Poland as Sybiraks ("Siberians"). Some of them remained there, forming a Polish minority in Siberia.

The most common occupations in katorga camps were mining and timber work. Another example involved the successful construction of the Amur Cart Road (Аму́рская колёсная доро́га, Amúrskaya kolyósnaya doróga).

In 1891 Anton Chekhov, the Russian writer and playwright, visited the katorga settlements on Sakhalin island in the Russian Far East and wrote about the conditions there in his book Sakhalin Island. He criticized the short-sightedness and incompetence of the officials in charge that led to poor living standards, waste of government funds, and decreased productivity.

Peter Kropotkin, while aide de camp to the governor of Transbaikalia in the 1860s, was appointed to inspect the state of the prison system in the area; he later described his findings in his book In Russian and French Prisons (1887)

=== Soviet times ===
After the Russian Revolution of 1917 the Russian penal system was taken over by the Bolsheviks, who eventually transformed the katorga into the Gulag labor camps.

In 1943 the "katorga labor" (ка́торжные рабо́ты, kátorzhnyye rabóty) as a special, severe type of punishment was reintroduced. It was initially intended for Nazi collaborators, but other categories of political prisoners (for example, members of deported peoples who fled from exile) were also sentenced to "katorga labor". Prisoners sentenced to "katorga labor" were sent to gulag prison camps with the most harsh regime, and many of them died.

== Notable katorgas ==
- Nerchinsk katorga (Нерчинская каторга)
- Akatuy katorga (Акатуйская каторга)
- Algacha katorga (Алгачинская каторга)
- Kara katorga (Карийская каторга)
- Maltsev katorga (Мальцевская каторга)
- Zerentuy katorga (Зерентуйская каторга)
- Sakhalin katorga (Сахалинская каторга)

== Famous katorga convicts ==
=== Georgian ===
- Joseph Stalin escaped twice, in 1902 and 1908, before being finally confined in a katorga on the Yenisei River 1913–1917, finally being released at the time of the February Revolution

=== Russian ===
- Aleksandr Nikolayevich Radishchev, author and social critic arrested and exiled under Catherine the Great
- Decembrists: initial verdict was 16 people for term-less katorga, 5 persons for 10 years, 15 persons for 6 years. After the trial, Tsar Nicholas I reduced the sentences; subsequent amnesties further shortened the terms.
- Fyodor Dostoyevsky, from 1849 until 1854, for revolutionary activity against Tsar Nicholas I.
- Nikolai Chernyshevsky, from 1864 until 1872 for narodnik revolutionary activity.
- Vera Figner, a revolutionary and well-known political activist.
- Yelizaveta Kovalskaya, a revolutionary and founding member of the Black Repartition.
- Nadezhda Sigida, a revolutionary associated with Narodnaya Volya.
- David Riazanov, imprisoned from 1891 to 1895, a narodnik at the time and latter founder of the Marx-Engels Institute.
- Vladimir Sukhomlinov, a general in the Imperial Russian Army and former Minister of War, for abuse of power.
- Fanny Kaplan, a political revolutionary and attempted assassin of Vladimir Lenin.
- Andrei Sinyavsky, a dissident author tried in the 1960s with Yuli Daniel.

=== Polish ===
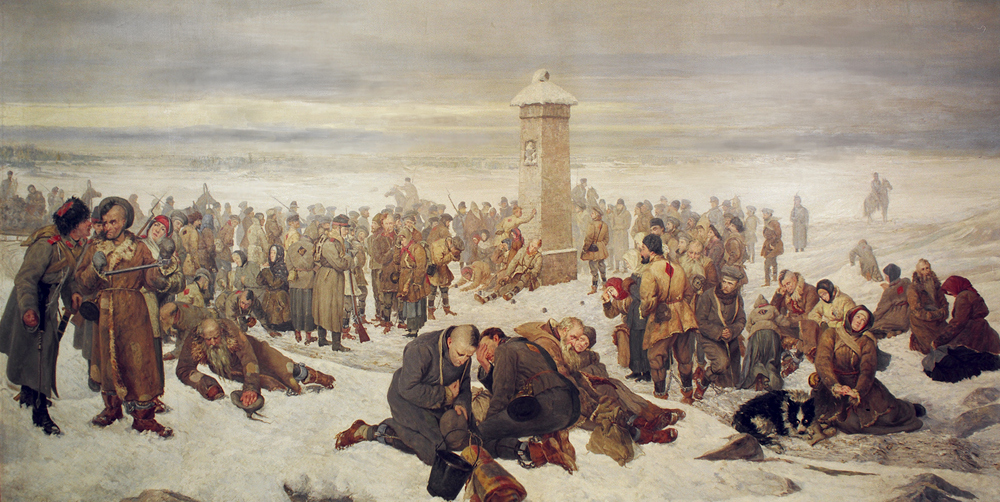
Farewell to Europe, by Aleksander Sochaczewski

- Felix Dzerzhinsky, the fouder of Cheka. Imprisoned for revolutionary activity in 1897 and 1900. Escaped twice.
- Aleksander Czekanowski
- Jan Czerski
- Benedykt Dybowski
- Bronisław Piłsudski
- Józef Piłsudski 1887–92
- Piotr Wysocki
- Barbara Skarga 1944–54

=== Ukrainian ===
- Poet and artist Taras Shevchenko, from 1847 until 1857, for revolutionary activity against Tsar Nicholas I of Russia.
- Lead Soviet rocket engineer during the space race, Sergei Korolev, from 1938 to 1944.
- Nadia Smyrnytska
- Maria Kovalevska
- Maria Kalyuzhnaya

== See also ==
- Gulag
- Bagne (penal establishment)
