= Sofya Bogomolets =

Russian revolutionary

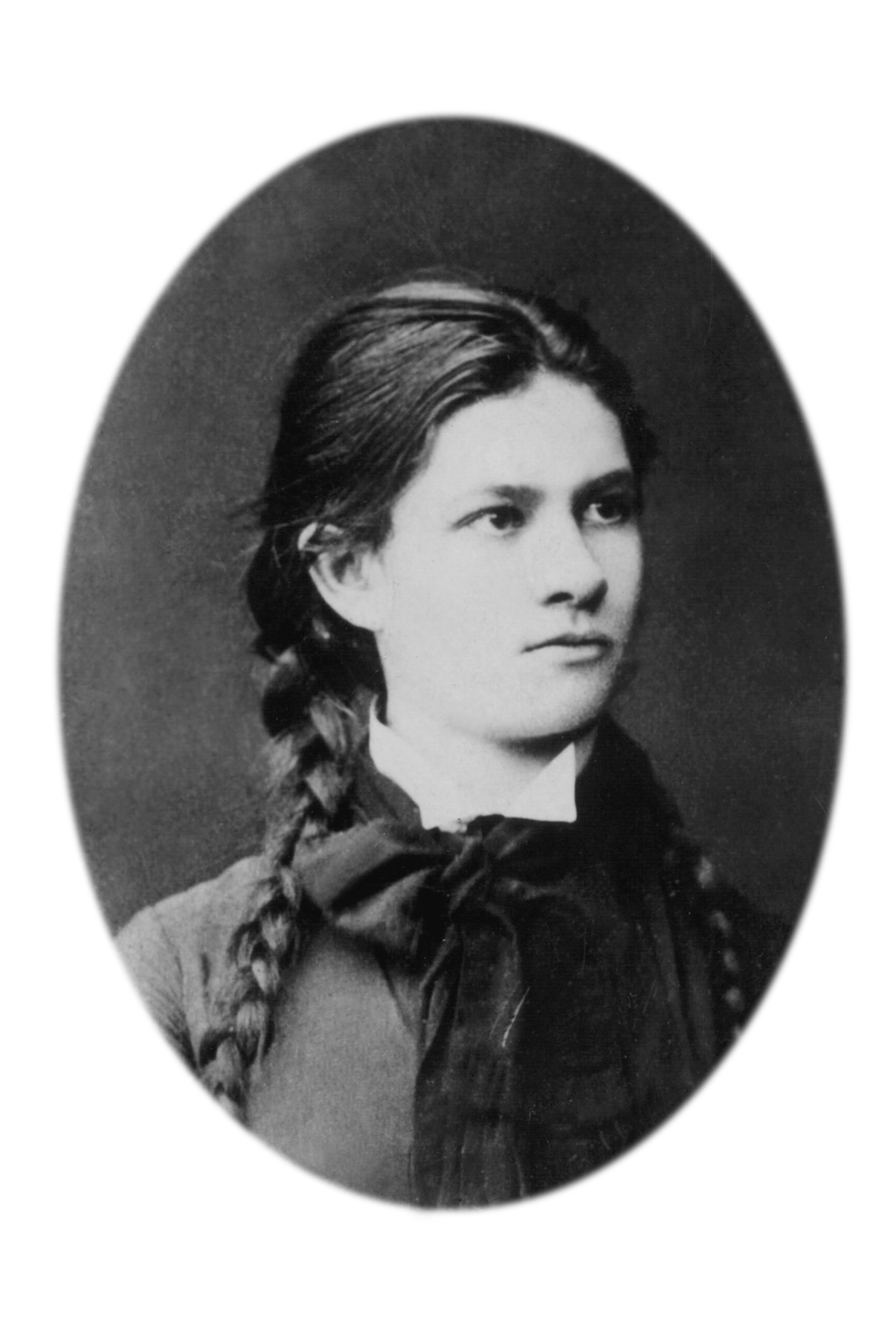
Sofya Bogomolets

Sofya Nikolaevna Bogomolets (née Prisetskaya) (Russian: Софья Николаевна Богомолетц; née Присецкая) (27 September 1856 – 11 January 1892) was a Russian revolutionary and political prisoner.

== Biography ==
Her family were hereditary Polish nobility, who owned land in Poltava province of Russia. All three siblings joined the populist movement in the 1870s. After graduating from a Kiev gymnasium, she enrolled in a women's medical course in St Petersburg, but abandoned her studies when in order to 'live with the people'. She and her husband, Alexander Bogolomets, whom she married in 1876, moved to Kuban, where they practised medicine and distributed anti-government propaganda. In 1879, they were forced to move to Kharkiv, but she was expelled and ordered to return to her native Poltava. Instead, she moved to Kiev, where she joined the South Russian Workers' Union, founded by Nikolai Schedrin and Elizaveta Kovalskaya. She formed an intense bond with Kovalskaya, who wrote in her memoirs that "I trusted Bogolomets completely; I knew she took things very seriously and - unlike some of the Kievans - strictly observed conspiratorial procedures.". After the two leaders were arrested, in 1880, she took over leadership of the union.

== Prison and Siberia ==
Bogomolets was arrested on a street in Kiev in January 1881, at a time when she was heavily pregnant. A search of her apartment uncovered stacks of illegal literature. She was held in Kiev prison, and gave birth to a son, Alexander, in an infirmary near the prison. The child was raised by grandparents. Tried by a military court, with nine others, in May 1881, she was sentenced to ten years in the mines in Kara katorga. She was transferred to Butyrka prison, in Moscow, and then prison in Krasnoyarsk. There, she complained to other prisoners that a warder named Ostrovsky had insulted her, though she would not repeat what he had said or done. This set off a protest in which Kovalskaya and others went on hunger strike, and a prisoner named Alexander Dolgushin slapped the offending warder. When they were moved to Irkutsk, Bogolomets and Kovalskaya insisted on travelling together. They escaped together in February 1882, but were recaptured after about two weeks. According to the American journalist George Kennan, who visited Siberia in the 1880s and interviewed political exiles, a warden named Colonel Soloviev had the two women stripped naked in his presence, then told their male comrades that they were "not much to look at." Back in prison, Bogolomets protested by ripping up floorboards and was put in a straitjacket. Kovalskaya, who tried to prevent the wardens from binding, was put in handcuffs. Shchedrin, who was in the same prison, punched Soloviev in the face, for which he was sentenced to death, though the sentence was commuted. Bogolomets had five years added to her sentence. Transferred to Kara in March 1882, she continued to protest against her conditions, and was transferred to Irkutsk prison, and had another year added to her sentence for insulting a guard. She contracted tuberculosis in prison. Released in January 1892, she died in Kara three days later.

== Family ==
Her husband, Alexander Mikhailovich Bogolomets (1850–1935) was in Paris in 1881, when he learnt of his wife's arrest, and returned illegally, intending to organise her escape. Alexander himself was arrested in January 1882, and sentenced to a year and a half in prison, followed by exile to Tobolsk, where he was permitted to resume practising medicine. He worked as a provincial doctor for many years, while effectively banned from living in any major city. in October 1890, he visited Leo Tolstoy at his home, Yasnaya Polyana, helped him with a translation, and enlisted the writer's help in obtaining permission to visit Sofya in Kara. In 1914, he settled in Moscow, where he died aged 84.

Their son, Alexander Alexandrovich Bogolomets (1881–1946) was one of the leading medical academics of his generation, and President of the Ukraine Academy of Sciences in 1930 until his death.

Sofya's Sister, Olga, was another member of the South Russia Workers' Union, tried, imprisoned and deported with Bogomolets and Kovalskaya. She was allowed to return to European Russia after completing her term of exile, but returned many years later to accompany one of her sons, who had been deported, and died in Siberia.

Their brother, Ivan Prisetsky, was also a populist revolutionary, but later joined the Constitutional Democratic Party.
