= Alexander Dolgushin =

Russian populist

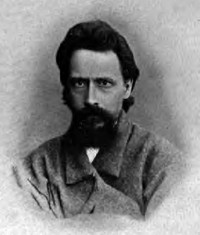
Alexander Dolgushin

Alexander Vasilievich Dolgushin (Russian: Александр Васильевич Долгушин) (June 1848 – 30 June 1885) was a Russian Empire populist and political prisoner.

== Early life ==
Dolgushin was born in a small town in the Tobolsk district of Siberia. His father was a judge and member of the minor nobility.

== Revolutionary career ==
In 1866, Dolgushin moved to St. Petersburg, supposedly to study, but has main purpose was political activities. He led a group of 13 students from Siberia, who began as a 'commune' - a cultural club offering mutual help and a library - and evolved into a political organization advocating Siberian independence. A portrait of Nikolay Chernyshevsky, whom they regarded as an honorary Siberian because he was in exile there, hung at their meetings.

In 1869, Sergey Nechayev made contact with the group during a short visit to St. Petersburg, and recruited one of its members, Pyotr Toporkov, to his conspiratorial Russian Revolutionary Society. In January 1870, Dolgushin and other members of the group were arrested, but after a year and a half in prison, they were acquitted in August 1871 for lack of evidence.

By autumn 1872, Dolgushin – married with an infant son – had formed a new student circle, the Group of Twenty-Two, who planned to foment a peasant rebellion by promising to free them from debt, redistribute land, end military conscription, abolish the internal passport system and set up village schools. Their propaganda was expressed in religious tones as if they were creating a "religion of equality". In March 1873, they moved to Moscow, then to a small house near the city, where they set up a printing press and began handing their books and pamphlets out to the peasants, who were astonished to be offered them free.

== Arrest and exile ==
The group was discovered when police arrested one of its members. Dolgushin was arrested in September 1873. He and 11 others were put on trial, which lasted a week, in July 1874. The two most active members, Dolgushin and Lev Dmokhovsky, were sentenced to five years hard labor. They were also subjected to symbolic execution, during which one of the group, Nikolai Plotnikov, started a demonstration by shouting "Down with the Tsar". As retribution, members of the group were confined in Kharkov Prison, instead of Siberia, in such harsh conditions that one of their numbers, a schoolteacher named Dmitri Gamov, went insane and died in the prison hospital. Dolgushin succeeded in getting an account of prison conditions smuggled out, to be printed illegally in St Petersburg in 1878.

In 1880, Dolgushin was sentenced to be deported to work in the mines in the Kara district of Siberia. En route, he was held in prison in Krasnoyarsk, where his father was then based as a judge. His wife moved to Krasnoyarsk with their son to be near him. One of his fellow prisoners there, Sofya Bogomolets, was insulted by a guard on the same day that Dolgushin was denied a visit by his son. Dolgushin reacted by slapping the offending guard. For that, he was sentenced to a further ten years hard labour. While in Kara, he helped fellow revolutionary Ippolit Myshkin to escape, for which he was transferred to the Peter and Paul Fortress. In 1884, he was moved to Shlisselburg, where he died of tuberculosis.

== Personality ==
Dolgushin was a natural leader. Writer Vladimir Korolenko, who met him in Siberia, thought that he was the "most significant" of the political prisoners there. Elizaveta Kovalskaya, who was in prison with him in Krasnoyarsk, wrote that "he impressed me as a person constantly burning with some inner fire, all the while maintaining an external calm in his movements and speech. Only his dark, rather sombre eyes betrayed some kind of profound suffering. His small slender figure appeared in the common room only at eating times. He made witty, biting remarks, but he never smiled. It was as if some sort of mask had hardened his face."
