= Sergei Bobokhov =

Russian politician

Sergei Nikolaevich Bobokhov (Russian: Сергей Николаевич Бобохов; 1858 – 16 November 1889) was a Russian revolutionary, who committed suicide as a protest against the flogging of a woman comrade in Siberia.

== Biography ==
Born into a wealthy Russian family, he was educated at a gymnasium in Saratov, and as teenager joined the 'to the people' movement when young middle class radicals visited villages hoping to improve the lot of Russian peasants. Unlike many others, he avoided arrest, and in 1875 entered university in St-Petersburg, but was expelled in 1876 and sent back to Saratov for taking part in a student protest. The following year, he was exiled to Arkhangelsk for spreading populist propaganda. He attempted to escape, but was caught on the road. He was accused of shooting at the police during his arrest, though he claimed that he had fired in the air, hoping that he would be tried in public and would be able to use his trial to expose the arbitrariness of Tsarist rule. He was sentenced to death by a military tribunal in Arkhangel, but because of his youth - he was aged 19 - the sentence was commuted to 20 years hard labour in Kara katorga. He spent ten years in the Kara convict settlement, working in the mines. On hearing of the death of the political prisoner Nadezhda Sigida, who had been subjected to 100 lashes, he was one of 20 male prisoners who poisoned themselves in protest, on 15 November 1889. Most survived, but Bobokhov died the following day.
