= Nadezhda Sigida =

Russian revolutionary

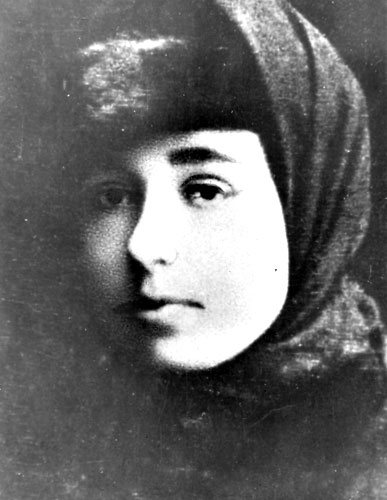
- Born: Nadezhda Malaxiano; 1862; Taganrog, Russian Empire
- Died: November 8, 1889; Ust-Kara, Russian Empire
- Occupations: teacher, revolutionary
- Known for: Kara katorga tragedy
- Political party: Narodnaya Volya
- Spouse: Akim Sigida

Nadezhda Konstantinovna Sigida (Russian: Наде́жда Константи́новна Сиги́да), née Malaxiano (Russian: Малаксиано) (1862–1889), was a Russian revolutionary, heroine of the Kara katorga tragedy of 1889.

== Background ==
Nadezhda Malaxiano was born into a Greek family in the city of Taganrog in 1862. She graduated from the Taganrog Mariinskaya Girls Gymnasium, and gave lessons in a church school. The family lived in a house on Gogolevski Street 8, next to Anton Chekhov's family house. Nadezhda Malaxiano became involved with a Narodnaya Volya group, being one of its activists in Taganrog's underground printshop in 1885–1886 on Glushko Street 60. She made a sham marriage with Akim Sigida (1868-1888) for conspiracy work at the printshop.

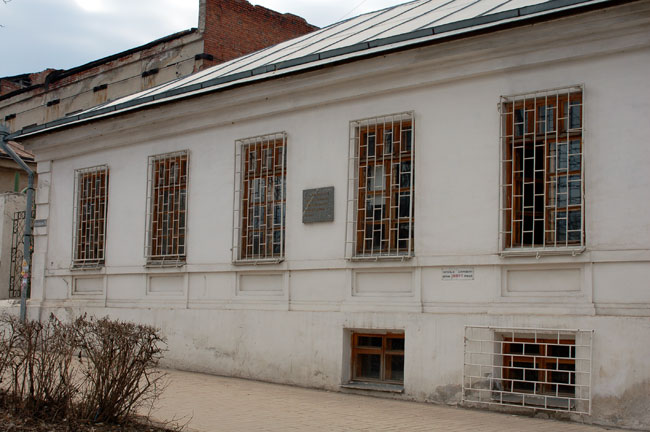
Birthhouse of Nadezhda Sigida (Malaxiano) in Taganrog. © TaganrogCity.Com

== The Don Process ==
On 23 January 1886 following the disclosure of Narodnaya Volya's printers in Taganrog, she was arrested along with other organization members. The special hearing for her case was held in the Senate December 8–9, 1887 and was referred to as The Don Process (Донской процесс). At court, Nadezhda Sigida used the tactics of Narodnaya Volya, refusing to testify and only acknowledging her membership to the revolutionary organization. She was sentenced to death penalty. Sigida appealed for pardon following the request of Malaxiano family, and the death penalty was replaced by 8 years of katorga on Kara River in Transbaikalia.

== The Kara katorga tragedy ==
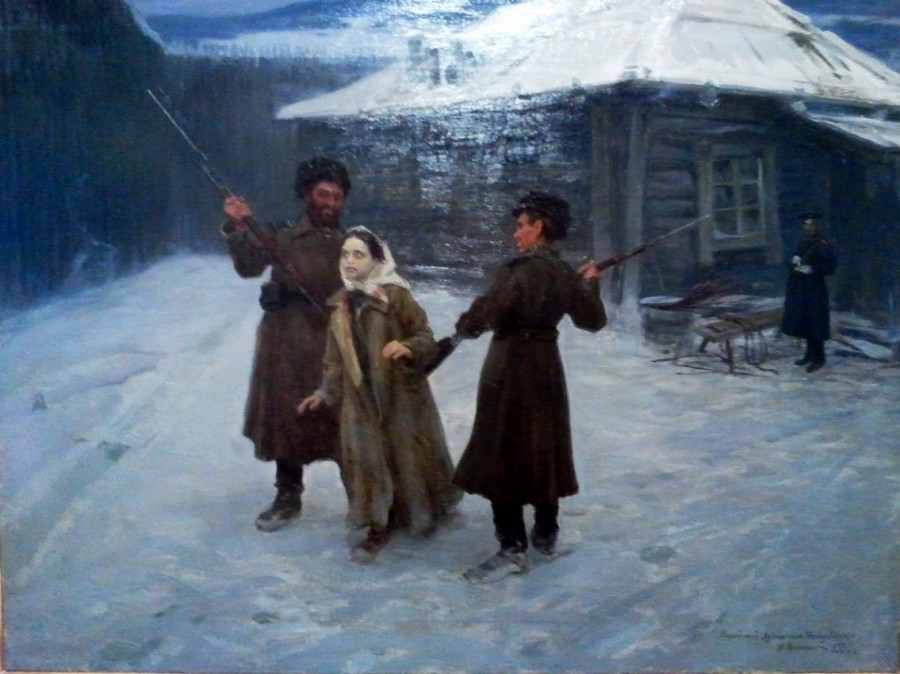
"Sigida (Kara tragedy)" by Nikolay Kasatkin, 1930

Sigida was a participant with fellow women convicts in demanding the removal of the prison commandant, Lt.Col. Masiuyukov, who was allowing harsh treatment of the women convicts, as evidenced in the incident with Yelizaveta Kovalskaya in Aug. 1888. Two hunger strikes followed without any changes. Nadezhda Sigida then slapped Masiuyukov's face on 31 Aug. 1889. This resulted in her transfer into the criminal section of the prison at Ust Kara. A third hunger strike followed on 1 Sept. 1889, resulting in Maria Kalyuzhna, Nadia Smyrnytska, and Maria Kovalevska being transferred to Ust Kara. The governor-general Andrei Korf sentenced Sigida to 100 birch-rods, but the order was not immediately carried out following a report from the prison surgeon that she could not withstand the punishment. The governor-general reiterated the order and it was carried out on 6 Nov. 1889. In protest, Nadezhda Sigida and 23 other political prisoners took poison. Six died. They included Nadezhda Sigida on 8 Nov., Maria Kalyuzhna, Nadia Smyrnytska, and Maria Kovalevska on 10 Nov., plus Ivan Kalyuzhny, and Sergei Bobokhof on 16 Nov.

== Aftermath ==
This event stirred public response. Reports on the events of 1889 were published in major Russian and European newspapers, including two articles in the British newspaper The Times. As a consequence, Kara katorga was closed, and the corporal punishment for imprisoned women and dvorianins (nobility) was abolished by the law of March 28, 1893.

== Personal life ==
In 1888, in the Moscow transit prison, 25-year-old Nadezhda met the young Ukrainian poet, Pavlo Hrabovsky, who was also convicted of revolutionary activity. They became friends and fell in love. However, they were soon destined to part for life after they were sent to different prisons. Many of Hrabovsky's lyrical poems are imbued with love for Nadezhda Sigida; the poet dedicated his first poetry collection, Snowdrop, to her.

== See also ==
- Kara katorga
- Narodnaya Volya
