= Nikolai Schedrin =

Russian revolutionary

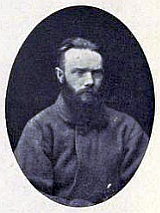
- Schedrin in 1905
- Born: 1858; Russia
- Died: 10 January 1919 psychiatric hospital, Kazan

Nikolay Pavlovich Schedrin (Николай Павлович Щедрин in Russian) (1858 — 10 January 1919) was a Russian revolutionary and narodnik.

== Biography ==
Nikolay Schedrin graduated from a military gymnasium in Omsk. In 1876, he joined Zemlya i volya in St. Petersburg.

After its split in 1879, Schedrin became a member of the Black Repartition. Together with Yelizaveta Kovalskaya, he organized the Workers' Union of Southern Russia in the spring of 1880 and composed its program and numerous leaflets.

Schedrin was arrested in October 1880 and sentenced to death by the district military court in Kiev on 29 May 1881. His sentence was later exchanged for eternal katorga. Schedrin was first sent to the Kara katorga, then Alekseyevsky ravelin in 1882, and later Shlisselburg fortress in 1884.

He soon became mentally ill and was finally transferred to a psychiatric hospital in Kazan in 1896, where he would die two years after the October Revolution.
