= Nikolai Kasatkin =

Nikolai Kasatkin may refer to:

- Saint Nicholas of Japan, Nikolai Kasatkin (born Ivan Dimitrovich Kasatkin 1836; died 1912)
- Russian painter Nikolai Alekseyevich Kasatkin (1859 – 1930)
