= Ust-Karsk =

Ust-Karsk Усть-карск
- Urban-type settlement
- Interactive map of Ust-Karsk
- Location of Ust-Karsk Ust-Karsk (Zabaykalsky Krai)
- Coordinates: 52.7120°N 118.8194°E
- Country: Russia
- Federal subject: Zabaykalsky Krai
- Administrative district: Sretensky District

Population (2010 Census)
  - Total: 1,899
  - Estimate (1 January 2018): 1,688 (−11.1%)
- Time zone: UTC+9 (MSK+6)
- Postal code: 673562
- OKTMO ID: 76640156051

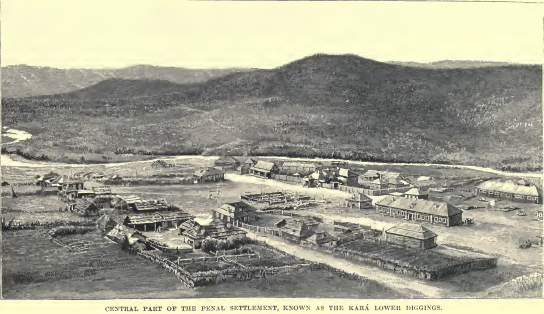
Kara Lower Diggings in 1885

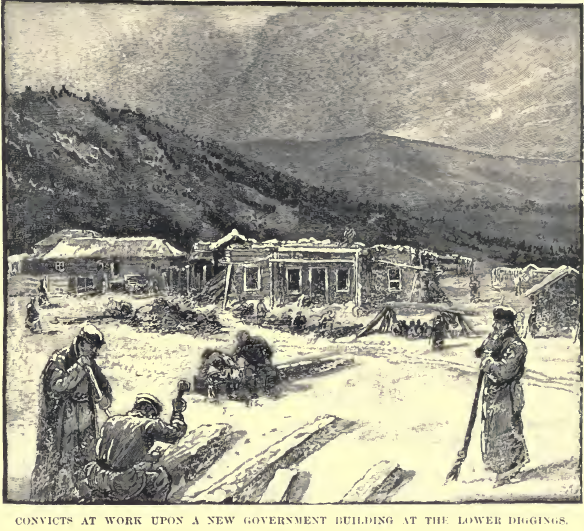
Kara Lower Diggings 1885

Ust-Karsk (Russian: Усть-карск), formerly known as Ust-Kara (Russian: Усть-кара) is an urban-type settlement in the Sretensky District of Zabaykalsky Krai, Russia. The settlement is located on the northern bank of the Shilka River, near the mouth of its left tributary, the Kara River.

Population: 1,899 (2010 census); 2,035 (2002 census); 2,541 (1989 Soviet census).

The name of the town means "Kara mouth".

== Climate ==
Ust-Karsk has a pure continental climate and it is the hottest place in Siberia. On June 24-25, 2010, Ust-Karsk set the high temperature record for Asian Russia,42.7 °C (108.9 °F). This took place during a massive heatwave felt throughout Russia and China. In the coldest winters, it can be as cold as at least −55 °C (−67 °F).

== History ==
The history of Ust-Kara is closely connected to that of the Kara katorga, a network of prison settlements that existed in the area in 1838–1893. Prisoners were used to work gold mines. In the early 1850s, the annual gold production on the Kara was around 70 pood (1100 kg).

In the 1850s, during the preparations for the Amur Annexation, Ust-Kara was one of the sites (along with the Shilkinsky Zavod and Bolshaya Kularka) where barges were built for the Russian military expeditions down the Amur.

== See also ==
- Nerchinsk katorga
- Nadezhda Sigida
