= Maria Kutitonskaya =

Ukrainian revolutionary (1856–1887)

- Мария Кутитонская
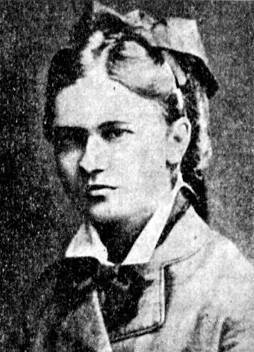
- Kutitonskaya (1878)
- Born: 23 February 1856; Odesa, Russian Empire
- Died: 4 May 1887 (aged 31); Irkutsk, Russian Empire
- Movement: Narodniks

Maria Ignatevna Kutitonskaya (Russian: Мария Игнатьевна Кутитонская; 1856–1887) was a Ukrainian Narodnik revolutionary. After involvement with a revolutionary circle in Odesa, she was exiled to Siberia. There she attempted to assassinate the military governor Luka Illyashevich.

== Biography ==
Maria Kutitonskaya was born into a noble family in Odesa, in 1856. She graduated from school in 1875 and went on to serve in the Odesa City Duma. The following year, she travelled to Paris, where she met Russian revolutionary German Lopatin. After returning to Odesa, she joined the revolutionary circle led by Ivan Kovalskyy. She was arrested for her participation in the circle on 20 July 1878, but was released on bail.

On 19 June 1879, she was arrested again for her continued association with revolutionaries in Odesa. She was found guilty by the Odesa Military District on 5 August and sentenced to 15 years of penal labour, but her sentence was commuted to 4 years by the governor of Odesa. On 15 January 1880, she arrived at the Kara katorga to begin her sentence. On 23 July 1882, she was transferred to the settlement in Aksha.

On 16 September 1882, she shot at the governor of Transbaikal Oblast, Luka Illyashevich, in revenge for violence committed against exiles. On 17 November 1882, she was tried for the assassination attempt in Chita and sentenced to death, but the sentence was commuted to indefinite penal labour. She wasn't transferred back to Kara, as the authorities feared her influence on the other prisoners. Instead she was imprisoned in Irkutsk on 7 January 1883. She died there from tuberculosis on 4 May 1887.

== Bibliography ==
- Galin, Anton Gerasimovich; Vyalchin, Ivan Sergeevich; Vyazmin, Innokenty Nikolayevich (24 July 2017). "Кутитонская, Мария Игнатьевна" [Kutitonskaya, Maria Ignatyevna]. Irkipedia (in Russian). Archived from the original on 2 August 2017.
- Kennan, George (1891). "The History of the Kará Political Prison". Siberia and the Exile System. Vol. 2. pp. 240–245.
- Moshkina, Zoya Veniaminovna (13 January 2011). "Возмездие или продолжение борьбы? (сибирское дело М.И. Кутитонской.)" [Retribution or continuation of the struggle? (The Siberian case of M.I. Kutitonskaya)]. Siberia and the Exile (in Russian). Irkutsk State University. Archived from the original on 27 August 2012.
- Shilov, A. A.; Karnaukhova, M. G., eds. (1930). "Кутитонская, Мария Игнатьевна" [Kutitonskaya, Maria Ignatyevna]. Деятели революционного движения в России (in Russian). Vol. 2. Moscow: Society of Former Political Prisoners and Exiled Settlers. pp. 722–723. OCLC 749336544.
