= Journey from St. Petersburg to Moscow =

1790 novel by Alexander Radishchev

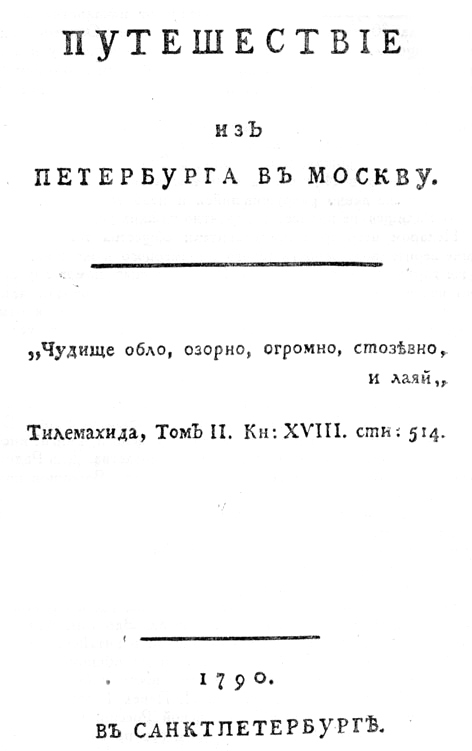
Title page from the first edition, 1790

Journey From Petersburg to Moscow (in Russian: Путешествие из Петербурга в Москву), published in 1790, is the most famous work by the Russian writer Aleksander Nikolayevich Radishchev.

The work, often described as a Russian Uncle Tom's Cabin, is a polemical study of the problems in the Russia of Catherine the Great: serfdom, the powers of the nobility, the issues in government and governance, social structure and personal freedom and liberty. The book starts from an epigraph about The Beast who is "enormous, disgusting, a-hundred-maws and barking", meaning the Russian Empire.

Journey represented a challenge to Catherine in Russia, despite the fact that Radishchev was no revolutionary: merely an observer of the ills he saw within Russian society and government at the time. The book was immediately banned and Radishchev sentenced, first to death, then to banishment in eastern Siberia. It was not freely published in Russia until 1905.

Written during the period of the French Revolution, the book borrows ideas and principles from the great philosophers of the day relating to an enlightened outlook and the in particular contemporary understandings of Natural Law.

== Synopsis ==
In the book, Radishchev takes an imaginary journey between Russia's two principal cities; each stop along the way reveals particular problems for the traveller through the medium of story telling. In Petersburg, the narrator's story begins at an inn where the proprietor is too lazy to harness his underfed horses for a carriage. Eventually getting on the road, he encounters a man trying to sell genealogical papers to nobles seeking to increase their rank, and a poor peasant laboring on a Sunday. He goes on to satirize Catherine's favorite, Viceroy Potemkin, with an anecdote about his appetite for oysters and the absurd lengths his servant would go to get them.

Likely the most famous scene is the narrator's dream of being a "tsar, shah, khan, king, bey, nabob, sultan, or holder of some such dignity, sitting in regal power on a throne". At his most minor expression, the courtiers sigh, frown, light up with joy. Seeing this obsequiousness, the narrator-tsar orders the invasion of a distant country, which he is assured will submit to his mere reputation. Suddenly, the female figure of Truth appears, offering him clearsightedness and defending the rights of dissenters. After being reprimanded, the king is overcome by visions of his own brutality, the sins of his court, and the general disrepair of the empire. In a final moment of self-reproach and guilt, inspired by the gaudy and wasteful palace he's built, the narrator is woken from his dream in agitation.

== Reception ==
Considered by many to be the seminal radical text of the 18th century, Journey continued to influence Russian political thought even after its condemnation. As the progenitor of public liberal discourse in Russia, Radishchev is considered an ancestor of all major subversive literature written in the 19th and 20th centuries.

Journey is best known as a critical satire of feudalism. An early, incomplete version was initially approved by imperial censors, and Czar Catherine the Great was expected to tolerate its publication. Instead, she condemned the book. Radishchev represented Russia's educated aristocrats, and Catherine feared that his calls for reform would spread to the rest of his class. Radishchev was arrested a month after Journey's publication, charged with inciting "disobedience and social discord," and sentenced to death. The original copies of Journey were confiscated, and the book was suppressed until 1905. Literary criticism was censored until 1857. Catherine the Great commuted Radishchev's sentence to exile. Alexander I fully pardoned him and appointed him to the Legislative Committee, which codified Russian law.

Journey strongly influenced the Decembrist movement. Early socialists Nikolai Ogarev and Alexander Herzen published a version of Journey from exile in 1858, and most Soviet critics claimed Radishchev as a precursor to Bolshevism.

Other Cold War-era criticism, from the USSR and the West, identified Radishchev as a liberal intellectual. D. M. Lang interpreted Journey as a tract in support of individual rights, especially freedom of expression, and government by the people. He claimed it an ancestor of anti-Soviet liberalism. Scholar Allen McConnell read it mainly as an attack on Czarist rule and the institution of serfdom.

== Philosophy ==
Radishchev studied at Leipzig University during Catherine the Great's liberal reforms, which exposed him to the French Enlightenment ideas that he argued for in Journey. Like contemporary French philosophers, Radishchev supported individual rights based on natural law and equality in the state of nature. He shared his belief in women's advancement and human progress with Condorcet. Journey also makes references to Adam Ferguson, Thomas Jefferson, Acts of Parliament, and American state constitutions, as well as the Bible and medieval Christian orthodoxy. A section cut from the published version, "Creation of the World," explicitly invoked the social contract and celebrated Oliver Cromwell and George Washington as anti-monarchists.

Journey argues for reform, not revolution. In two sections titled "Project for the Future," Radishchev imagined a harmonious Russia under a benevolent monarch. His critiques of the Russian aristocracy focused on abuses by new peers.

Journey presents morality as learned, not inherent. The narrator professes an individual faith in a single deity revered by every religion, and a quote from Joseph Addison in the same chapter may refer to Bernard Le Bovier de Fontenelle's heretical multiple-worlds theory.

== Literary style and influence ==
The final chapter of Journey credits Mikhail Lomonosov with the creation of literary Russian. Radishchev's style draws on works by Vasily Trediakovsky, Abbé Raynal, Jean-Jacques Rousseau. He alludes to Laurence Sterne and Horace. At his trial, Radishchev testified that he wrote Journey to imitate Sterne and Guillaume Thomas Raynal.

Journey is notable for its unusual writing style. Radishchev mixes anecdotal, epistolary, and narrative styles. Point of view shifts between the central narrator and secondary characters, unconventional verb forms emphasize process over single actions, and run-on sentences simulate stream of consciousness. Some chapters are written in clear, vernacular Russian, while others are opaque, written in a convoluted blend of real and invented Church Slavonic.

Radishchev's prose was initially unpopular. He was compared unfavorably with his contemporary Nikolay Karamzin, in early nineteenth century debates about modernization between supporters of Karamzin and conservative Alexander Shishkov, and as recently as 1958 by editor Roderick Page Thaler. Alexander Pushkin's 1836 essay "Alexander Radishchev" also criticized Radishchev's prose, but praised his intentions and philosophical ideas. His unpublished essay "Journey from Moscow to Petersburg" was a response to the book.

In 2020, translators Andrew Kahn and Irina Reyfman wrote that the novel's difficult style was meant to encourage readers to analyze its ideas. Journey's epigraph quotes Trediokovsky's Tilemakhida, a Russian-language poetic version of an educational prose work by François Fénelon. Tilemakhida was a mixture of narrative and instruction in a neoclassical poetic style, originally intended to mirror the treatise's content and educate the reader, but outmoded by 1790. The epigraph presents Journey as a member of the same genre.

== Translations ==
Journey was translated into German by Alexander Herzen in 1858. Two more German versions were written in 1922 and 1952. It was translated into Danish in 1949, Polish in 1956, and modern Russian in 1921.

English translations:

- A Journey From St. Petersburg to Moscow, Cambridge: Harvard University Press, 1958. Translated by Leo Wiener. Edited with an introduction and notes by Roderick Page Thaler.
- A Journey From St. Petersburg to Moscow, Columbia University Press, 2020 (The Russian Library). Translated by Andrew Kahn and Irina Reyfman.
