= Yelizaveta Kovalskaya =

Russian revolutionary and narodnik

- Russian: Елизавета Николаевна Солнцева
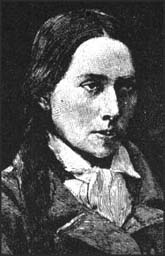
- Born: Yelizaveta Solntseva; 17/29 June 1851; Russia
- Died: 1943 (aged 91–92); Soviet Union

Yelizaveta Nikolayevna Kovalskaya (Russian: Елизавета Николаевна Ковальская; 17/29 June 1851 – 1943) was a Russian revolutionary, narodnik, and founding member of Black Repartition.

== Early life ==
Kovalskaya was born near Kharkiv. Her mother was a serf, who belonged to her father, Colonel Solntsev. When she was aged about seven, she confronted her father, having just learnt that "there were landowners and peasant serfs in the world, that landowners could sell people, that my father could separate my mother and me by selling her to one neighbouring landowner and me to another—but my mother could not sell my father." He agreed to free them both, and had them registered as free citizens, and arranged for her to be privately educated. When he unexpectedly died, he left his large estate to his illegitimate daughter. She used her new wealth to organise free higher education courses for women, and hired a lecturer named Yakov Kovalsky, whom she married but later divorced, until a police officer came and threatened to arrest them both unless they stopped.

== Revolutionary life ==
Kovalskaya went on to join the Kharkov society for the promotion of literacy. She was inspired by the women's movement in the 1860s and so she was always interested in feminist and socialist views. Impressed by the work of Robert Owen, she used one of her inherited houses as a college for young women seeking education.

In 1869, she met Sophia Perovskaya and began attending her women's meeting, both joining Zemlya i volya (The Land and Liberty).

When Zemlya i volya split in 1879, Kovalskaya joined the Black Repartition, while her colleague Perovskaya joined Narodnaya Volya (The Peoples Will). Black Repartition rejected terrorism, while Narodnaya Volya felt that terrorist acts were an appropriate method in forcing reforms. Kovalskaya worked with Black Repartition to support a socialist propaganda campaign among workers and peasants.

In 1880, together with Nikolai Schedrin, she took part in organizing the Worker's Union of Southern Russia in Kiev. Although only involved in propaganda work, she was arrested in 1881, found guilty of being a member of an illegal organization and sentenced to an open-ended katorga in 1881. In 1882, Kovalskaya was transferred to the Kara katorga. During the next twenty years, she went through several hunger strikes and made two unsuccessful prison escapes as well as knifed a prison guard. She and Sofya Bogomolets escaped together in February 1882, but were recaptured after about two weeks. According to the American journalist George Kennan, who visited Siberia in the 1880s and interviewed political exiles, a warden named Colonel Soloviev had the two women stripped naked in his presence, then told their male comrades that they were "not much to look at." Back in prison, Bogolomets protested by ripping up floorboards and was put in a straitjacket. Kovalskaya, who tried to prevent the wardens from binding her, was put in handcuffs. Shchedrin, who was in the same prison, punched Soloviev in the face, for which he was sentenced to death, though the sentence was commuted, and he was chained to a wheelbarrow. In 1888, she refused to stand up when the Governor General of the Amur region entered her cell. As a punishment, she was stripped naked by males soldiers, forced to wear the convict clothes of a common criminal, and taken 70 miles by stream in a small boat from Ust-Kara to a new place of deportation, Stretinsk. This set off a prolonged protest by other female political prisoners in Ust-Kara, which began with a sixteen day hunger strike and culminated in the flogging of a prisoner, Nadezhda Sigida, and the deaths of five prisoners, who poisoned themselves in protest.

She was finally released in 1903, moving to Geneva and joining the Socialist Revolutionary Party. In 1903–1917, she was in exile in Switzerland and France.

In 1918, Kovalskaya became a research worker at Petrograd Historical Revolutionary Archive and member of the editorial board of the Katorga and Exile magazine.

She had been married twice, and there was never any mention of her having children.
