= Katorga labor (Soviet Union) =

In the law of the Soviet Union, katorga labor was a severe category of penal labor. "Katorga" was a system of penal labor in the Russian Empire, hence the term. It was introduced during World War II by the April 22, 1943, decree of the Presidium of the Supreme Soviet of the Soviet Union "О мерах наказания изменникам Родине и предателям и о введении для этих лиц, как меры наказания, каторжных работ". ("On the Types of Punishment for the Treasoners and Traitors and on the Introduction of Katorga Labor as a Type of Punishment for Such Persons"). By this decree, katorga units were established in Vorkutlag and Sevvostlag. Katorga labor was characterized by the longer workday and hard workplace conditions, such as underground coal mining, gold and tin mining.

The abbreviation for the corresponding convicts was "з/к КТР" (z/k KTR). Katorga labor was initially intended for Nazi collaborators, but other categories of political prisoners (for example, members of deported peoples who fled from exile) were also sentenced to "katorga labor".

Later in 1943, the Presidium of the Supreme Soviet issued the decree "О мерах наказания для немецко-фашистских злодеев, виновных в истязаниях советского гражданского населения и пленных красноармейцев, для шпионов, изменников родины из числа советских граждан и для их пособников", in which section 2 provided punishment with katorga works for 15 to 25 years. By data for July 1944, there were 5,200 katorzhniks. In September 1947 they numbered over 60,000.
