= Sakhalin Island (book) =

1895 book by Anton Chekhov

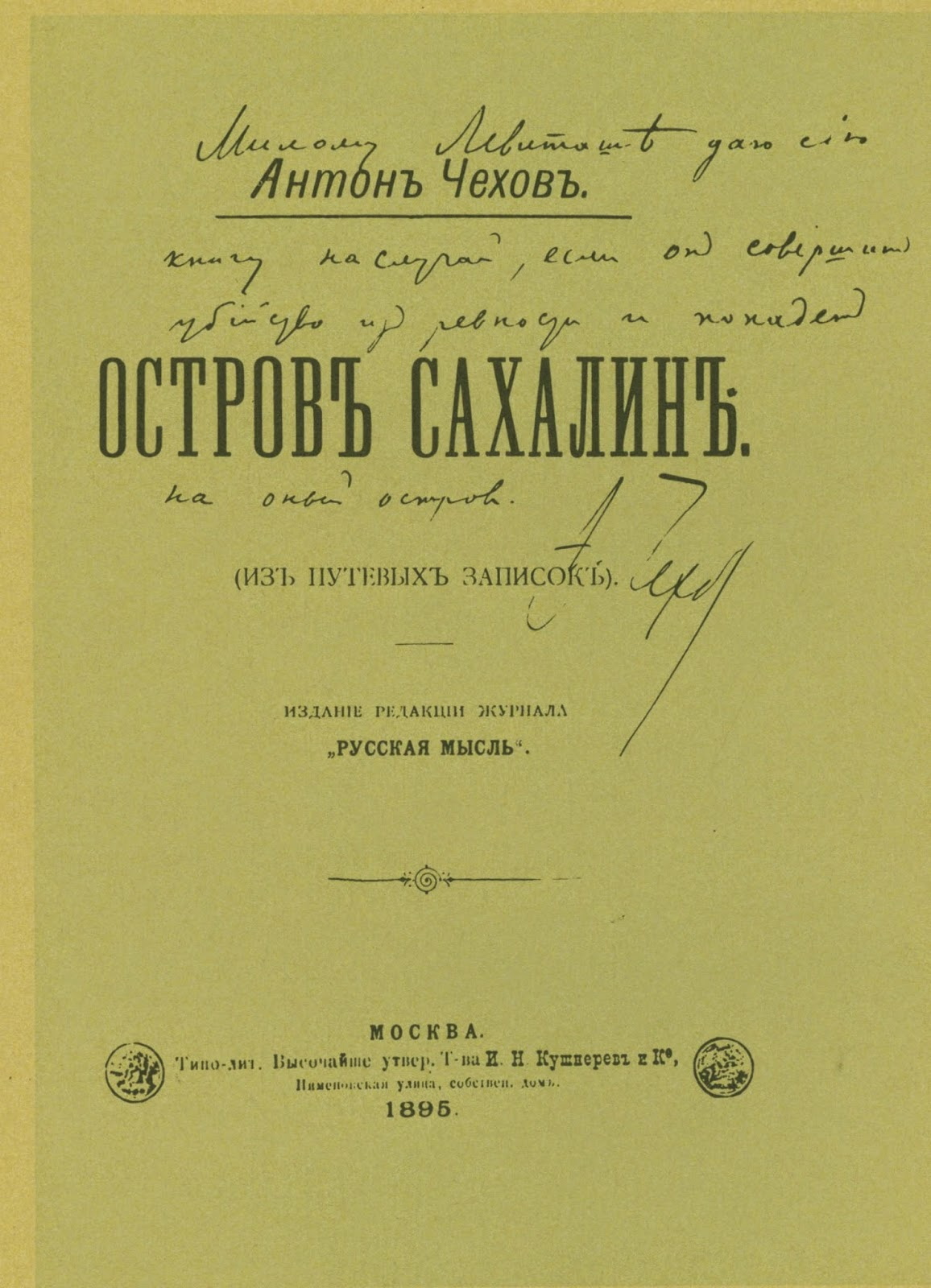
- Author: Anton Chekhov
- Original title: Russian: Остров Сахалин
- Language: Russian
- Genre: travel notes
- Publisher: Russkaya Mysl
- Publication date: 1893―1895
- Publication place: Russia
- English publication date: 1967

Sakhalin Island (Russian: Остров Сахалин) is a book by Anton Chekhov written and serialized in 1891–1893, which then appeared as a separate book in 1895. It consists of "travel notes" written after Chekhov's trip to the island of Sakhalin in summer and autumn of 1890. The book is based on the writer's personal travel experience, as well as on extensive statistical data collected by him. The English translation came out in 1967 under the title The Island: A Journey to Sakhalin.

In the opinion of some critics, the book was influenced by The House of the Dead by Fyodor Dostoyevsky and Siberia and Katorga by Sergei Maksimov (who is repeatedly mentioned in the text).

== Background ==
At the time Sakhalin was a frontier prison colony of the Russian Empire. In 1890, Chekhov undertook an arduous journey by train, horse-drawn carriage, and river steamer to the Russian Far East and the katorga, or penal colony, on Sakhalin Island, north of Japan, where he spent three months interviewing thousands of convicts and settlers for a census. The letters Chekhov wrote during the two-and-a-half-month journey to Sakhalin are considered to be among his best. His remarks to his sister about Tomsk were to become notorious.

Tomsk is a very dull town. To judge from the drunkards whose acquaintance I have made, and from the intellectual people who have come to the hotel to pay their respects to me, the inhabitants are very dull, too.

Chekhov witnessed much on Sakhalin that shocked and angered him, including floggings, embezzlement of supplies, and forced prostitution of women. He wrote, "There were times I felt that I saw before me the extreme limits of man's degradation." He was particularly moved by the plight of the children living in the penal colony with their parents. For example:

On the Amur steamer going to Sakhalin, there was a convict who had murdered his wife and wore fetters on his legs. His daughter, a little girl of six, was with him. I noticed wherever the convict moved the little girl scrambled after him, holding on to his fetters. At night the child slept with the convicts and soldiers all in a heap together.

Chekhov later concluded that charity was not the answer, but that the government had a duty to finance humane treatment of the convicts. His findings were published in 1893 and 1894 as Ostrov Sakhalin (The Island of Sakhalin), a work of social science, not literature.

== Publication ==
Anton Chekhov returned from Sakhalin to Moscow on December 8, 1890, and at the beginning of 1891 began working on his book. He initially intended to print the entire book and refused to publish separate parts in literary journals, but in 1892 he agreed to publish Chapter XXII ("Fugitives on Sakhalin") in the digest Helping the Hungry.

Chapters I–XIX were first published in the journal Russkaya Mysl in 1893 (nos 10–12) and 1894 (nos 2–7). In 1895 the book was at last published in a separate edition, with the addition of chapters XX–XXIII and with minor corrections of the first nineteen ones, entitled Sakhalin Island (From Travel Notes). Chapter XXII was reprinted in a separate edition (with significant text reductions and amendments) from the digest Helping the Hungry.

== Reception ==
According to Akhil Sharma, "The reason “Sakhalin Island” is the greatest work of journalism from the nineteenth century is that, unlike other major journalistic works from that period (for example, journalism from the Crimean War), the book has not aged. [...] Chekhov’s articles are mostly about closely observed humanity."

== See also ==
- "In Exile" (short story)
- The Gulag Archipelago
- Cursed Days
- A Confession

== Bibliography ==
- Malcolm, Janet (2004) [2001]. Reading Chekhov, a Critical Journey. London: Granta Publications. ISBN 9781862076358. OCLC 224119811.
- Simmons, Ernest Joseph (1970) [1962]. Chekhov: A Biography. Chicago: University of Chicago Press. ISBN 9780226758053. OCLC 682992.
- Rayfield, Donald (1997). Anton Chekhov: A Life. London: HarperCollins. ISBN 9780805057478. OCLC 654644946, 229213309.
- Wood, James (2000) [1999]. "What Chekhov Meant by Life". The Broken Estate: Essays in Literature and Belief. New York, NY: Modern Library. ISBN 9780804151900. OCLC 863217943.
