= Nadia Smyrnytska =

Ukrainian revolutionary (1852–1889)

- Надія Смирницька
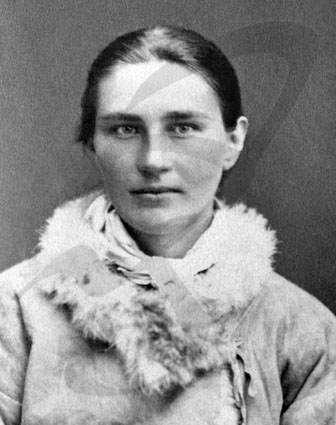
- Smyrnytska (1883)
- Born: 1852; Kiev, Russian Empire
- Died: 7 November 1889 (aged 36–37); Kara katorga, Transbaikal, Russian Empire
- Cause of death: Suicide
- Organization: Narodnaya Volya
- Spouse: Ivan Kalyuzhny

Nadia Symonivna Smyrnytska (Ukrainian: Надія Симонівна Смирницька; (Note: Also known by the Russian: Надежда Семеновна Смирницкая, romanized: Nadezhda Semenovna Smirnitskaya.) 1852 – 7 November 1889) was a Ukrainian Narodnik revolutionary. The daughter of a priest killed by Cossacks, she joined the Narodniks during the 1870s and was arrested for her activities. She escaped enforced exile, going on to work for Narodnaya Volya, but was rearrested and imprisoned in Kara katorga. There, along with other imprisoned revolutionary women, she committed suicide in protest against their abuse by the prison authorities.

== Biography ==
Nadia Symonivna Smyrnytska was born in 1852, in the Kiev Governorate of the Russian Empire, into the family of a local priest. In 1855, her father Symon Smyrnytskyi was tortured and killed during the Kiev Cossacks insurrection, which demanded the abolition of serfdom.

In 1876, Smyrnytska joined a Narodnik circle in Kiev. She was arrested for her activities in May 1879 and exiled to Solvychegodsk, in the Russian North, where she married Ivan Kalyuzhny. She managed to escape in March 1880, together with her new husband. She then went to Moscow where she joined Narodnaya Volya, setting up a passport office for the organisation in her flat.

She was arrested again in March 1882 and tried in the Trial of the 17, in which she was sentenced to 15 years of penal labour in Kara katorga. In protest against the abuse of imprisoned women in Kara, she committed suicide in November 1889, alongside Nadezhda Sigida and fellow Ukrainian revolutionaries Maria Kovalevska and Maria Kalyuzhnaya.

== Bibliography ==
- Bazhan, Mykola, ed. (1983). "СМИРНИЦЬКА Надія Симонівна" [SMYRNYTSKA Nadiia Symonivna]. Ukrainian Soviet Encyclopedia (in Ukrainian). Vol. 10. p. 271. OCLC 500078706.
- Netkal, N.V. (2019). "Подорож в історію села Пішки" [A journey into the history of the village on foot]. Korsun-Shevchenkivskyi Public Library (in Ukrainian). Archived from the original on 3 December 2021.
- Patronova, A.G. (1998). "СМИРНИЦКАЯ Надежда Семеновна" [SMIRNITSKAYA Nadezhda Semyonovna]. Encyclopedia of Transbaikalia (in Russian). Vol. 3.
- Rudyachenko, Oleksandr (31 August 2018). "Грабовський. Із бенкету людожерності" [Grabovski. From the feast of cannibalism]. Ukrinform (in Ukrainian).
