= Maria Kalyuzhnaya =

Ukrainian revolutionary (1864–1889)

- Мария Калюжная
- Born: 1864; Lebedyn, Kharkov Governorate, Russian Empire
- Died: 7 November 1889 (aged 24–25); Kara katorga, Transbaikal, Russian Empire
- Cause of death: Suicide by poisoning
- Organization: Narodnaya Volya
- Relatives: Ivan Kalyuzhny (brother)

Maria Vasilyevna Kalyuzhnaya (Russian: Мария Васильевна Калюжная; (Note: Also known by the Ukrainian: Марія Василівна Калюжна, romanized: Maria Vasylivna Kalyuzhna.) 1864 – 7 November 1889) was a Ukrainian Narodnik revolutionary. She was arrested in 1882 for her involvement in the printing operations of Narodnaya Volya, and again in 1884 for attempting to assassinate a Gendarme. She committed suicide by poisoning in the Kara katorga, in protest against the abuse of imprisoned women by the prison authorities.

== Biography ==
Maria Vasilyevna Kalyuzhnaya was born in 1864, in Lebedyn, a city in the Kharkov Governorate of the Russian Empire. She was the daughter of a merchant and the younger sister of Ivan Kalyuzhny. She studied at women's schools in Kharkov and Romny, graduating in 1880.

She joined the Narodniks and was arrested in Odesa in 1882, on charges of printing subversive literature for Narodnaya Volya. The military administration sent her to live under house arrest with her mother in Okhtyrka, but she managed to escape. On 8 August 1884, she attempted to assassinated a colonel of the Gendarmerie. She was arrested, tried by a military tribunal on 29 August and sentenced to 20 years in prison.

She was imprisoned in Kara katorga, in the Transbaikal Oblast. When the revolutionary prisoner Nadezhda Sigida was transferred to a punishment regime for slapping an gendarme officer, Kalyuzhnaya, along with Maria Kovalevska and Nadia Smyrnytska, went on hunger strike for two weeks, demanding that Sigida be allowed to see them. The women were beaten and tortured for their defiance. In November 1889, Kalyuzhnaya committed suicide by poisoning together with Sigida, Kovalevska and Smyrnytska, in protest against the abuse of women by the prison authorities. After learning about this, her brother Ivan also committed suicide by poisoning.
