= Amur Cart Road =

Road in Amur Oblast, Russian Empire

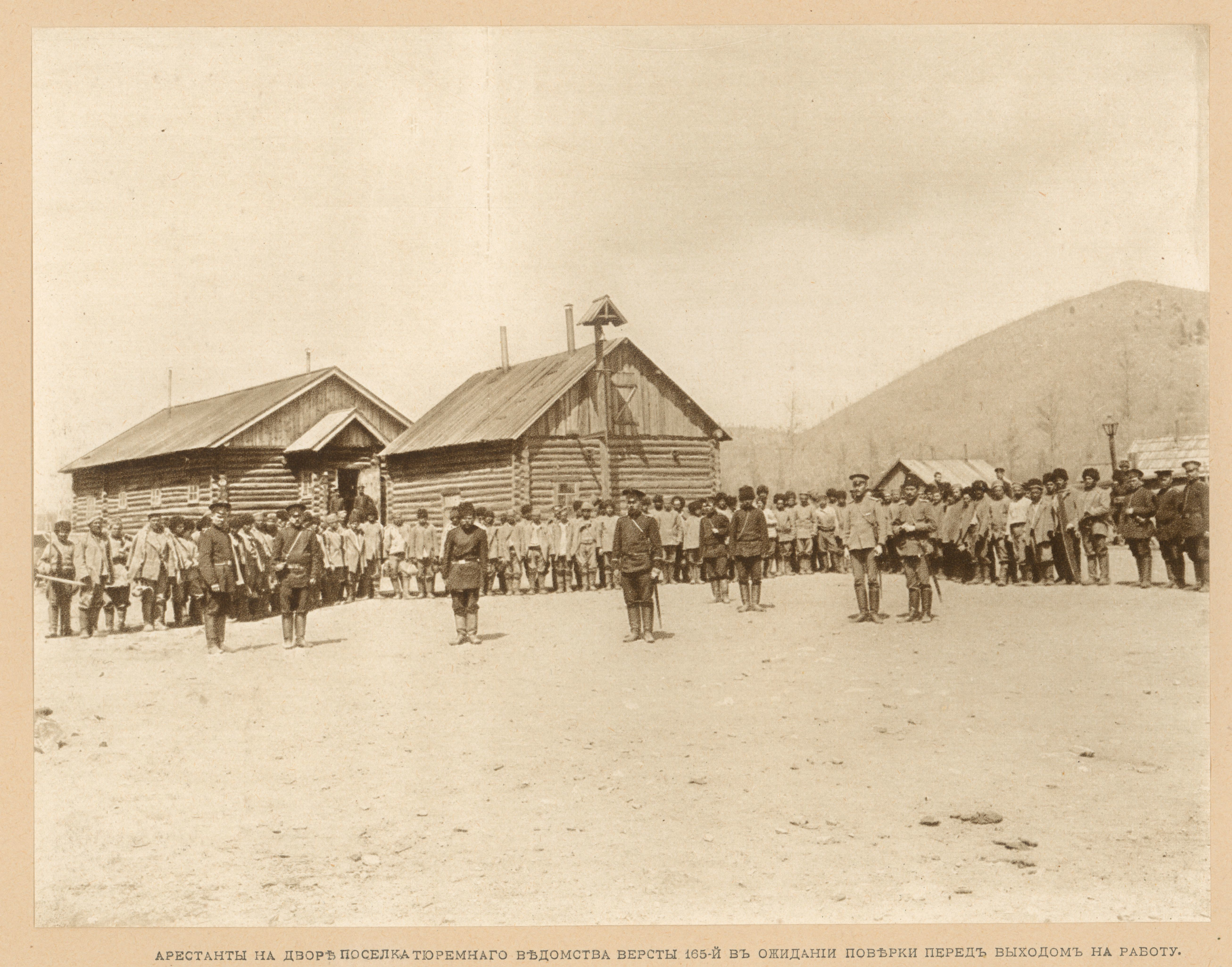
Prisoners lining up before leaving the camp for work on road construction.

The Amur Cart Road or Amur Wheel Road (Russian: Аму́рская колёсная доро́га or Аму́рская колесу́ха, tr. Amurskaya kolesuha) was a 2,000-kilometre (1,200 mi) cartage road in Amur Oblast of Imperial Russia that connected Khabarovsk with Blagoveshchensk through mostly uninhabited areas of taiga and swamps.

The road was built during 1898–1909 with nearly exclusive usage of katorga prison labor. It was praised as a success in its use of penal labor, claiming that no other country had any prison labor project comparable in scale. In 1905 over 700 convicts were simultaneously at work on the road. In this respect it was unsurpassed in the Gulag system of the Soviet Union.

== See also ==
- Siberian Route
- Kolyma Highway
- Amur Highway
