= Chelishchev family =

Russian noble family

Chelishchevs Челищевы
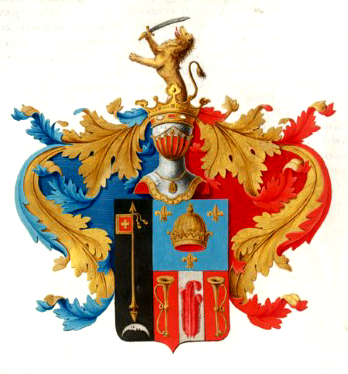
- Volume 2, Sheet 33 of the General Stamp; Part 6 of the Genealogy Book Excerpt from the General Stamp The shield is divided perpendicularly into two parts, of which in the right in the black field is the Banner having the Golden shaft, placed on the silver Crescent; the left part is cut horizontally by a line. In the upper part in the blue field is depicted the Cardinal Golden Hat and three golden Lilies near it. In the lower part in the red box are two golden Trumpets and between them on the silver strip are three ostrich Feathers of red color. The shield is crowned with an ordinary noble helmet with a noble crown on it, on the surface of which a lion with a sword is visible. The mantling on the shield is gold, blue and red.
- Country: Russia
- Origin: Kaluga Governorate, Pskov Governorate

The Chelishchev family is a family of Russian nobility, known from the end of the 15th century.

== Origin ==
The surname may come from the Turkic (Kazan–Tatar) nickname Chalysh, which means "oblique". In the 16th and 17th centuries, many of the Chelishchev nobles clearly had Turkic nicknames (such as, for example, Alai, Bulysh, Enaklych, Kulush, Sarmak, etc.), which may indicate an eastern origin. The knowledge of the Turkic languages is also indicated by the fact that in the years 1533–1542 the Chelishchev brothers were constantly sent to the Crimean Khanate for negotiations.

In the eighteenth century, when compiling the Herbovnik, the families of the Chelishchevs, Pantsyrevs and Glazatovs invented a common origin from the Welfs through the fictional "William of Luneburg from the generation of King Otto IV" who allegedly went "to the Grand Duke Alexander Yaroslavich to the Battle of the Neva" and adopted Orthodoxy with the name of Leon. At the same time, Mikhail Brenko, a favorite of Dmitry Donskoy, who laid down his head during the Battle of Kulikovo, was included in the number of ancestors of the Chelishchevs.

== Coat of arms description ==
In the Herbovnik of Anisim Titovich Knyazev of 1785 there is an image of two seals with the arms of representatives of the Chelishchev family:

1. Coat of arms of the court adviser Efim Petrovich Chelishchev: in the golden field of the shield from the upper edge are two yellow pipes, between them a blue flower on a green stem. Under the shield are two palm branches. The shield is covered with a princely mantle with a noble crown on it.
2. Coat of arms of the Privy Councilor (1798), Senator (1801), Alexei Bogdanovich Chelishchev: two yellow pipes are depicted in the golden field of the shield. The shield is crowned with a noble helmet with a kleinod on the neck, three ostrich feathers come out of the helmet. On the middle feather, between the two extremes, at a distance from the helmet is a noble crown. The color scheme of basting is not defined.

== Service people of the 16th–17th centuries ==
Boris Fedorovich Chelishchev, in 1498–99, the ambassador of Ivan III to the Crimean Khan Meñli Giray; in 1492, the Lithuanians burned his estate Alexino near Novgorod.

- Ilya Mikulych, nephew of the previous one, in 1515-19. the envoy of Vasily III in Crimea, on the way back, being robbed by the Astrakhan, walked to Putivl; in the same year he was again sent to Crimea, where he made peace and alliance with the khan; in 1527 the governor in Tula; died during the next embassy in the Crimea.
  - Ivan Ilyich, the son of the latter, ambassador to the Crimea, governor in the Kazan campaigns, was granted the estate in Kaluga district in 1550.
  - Fyodor Ivanovich, the brother of the previous one, the ambassador to the Crimea and the governor in the Kazan campaigns.
  - Fyodor Leontyevich, cousin of the two previous ones, governor in the Kazan campaign of 1544.
    - Ivan Fedorovich Postnik, his son, landowner of Polotsk (1571) and Toropetsk (1606) counties.
      - Osip Ivanovich Kulush, son of the previous, governor in Dankov in 1620–21.
      - Grigory Ivanovich Chebotay, his brother, in 1613–21 the governor in Ket prison.
        - Semyon Grigorievich Bulysh, son of Chebotay (d. 1641), head in Chernigov and Mirgorod (1635).
        - Boris Grigorievich Enaklych (d. 1663), brother of the previous, regimental governor in Vitebsk (1657), envoy to the court of the Swedish Queen Christina (1652).
          - Mikhail Borisovich, son of Enaklych, steward, second judge of the Vladimir Order (1686).

== Toropetsk landowners ==
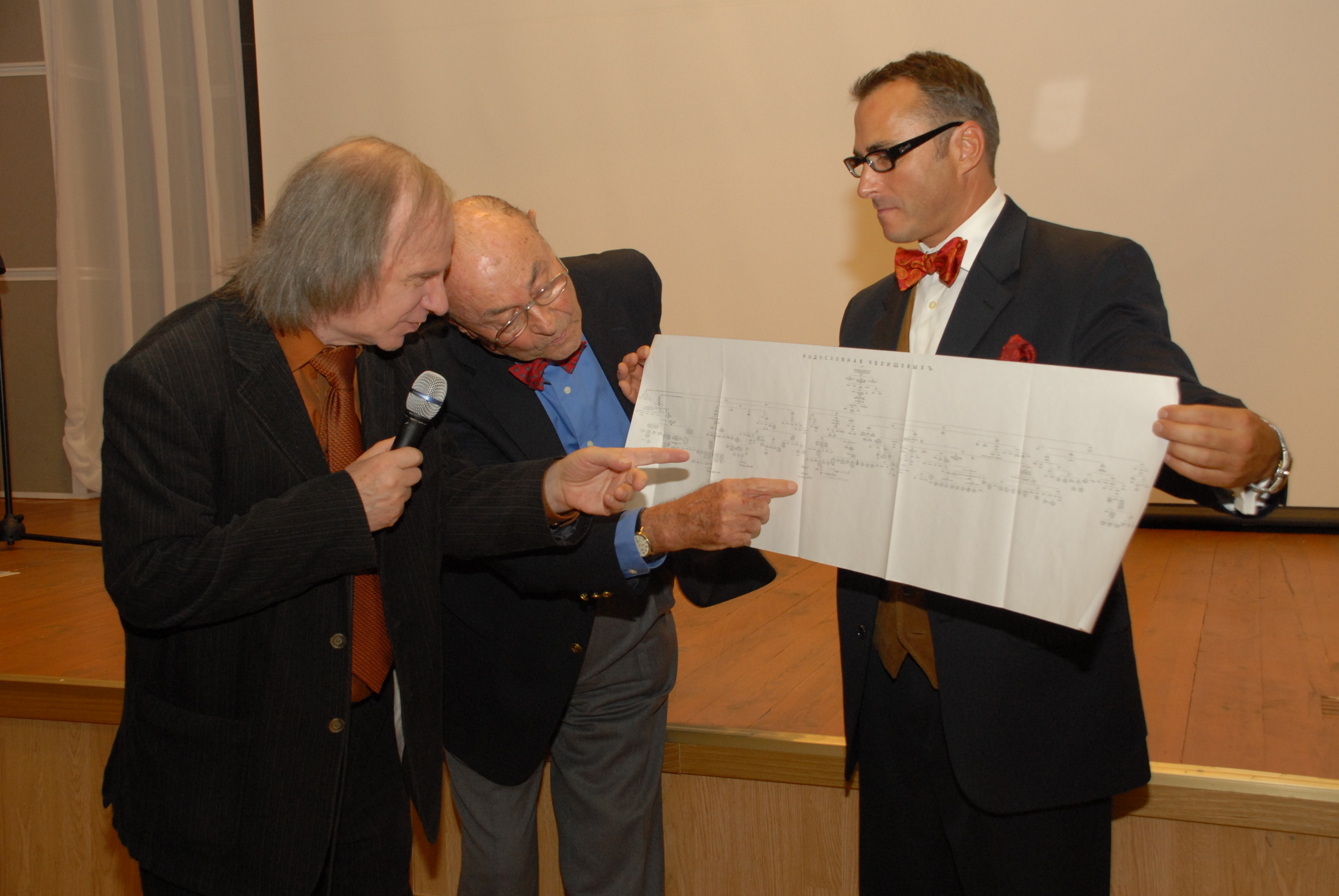
Descendants of the Chelishchevs evaluate the family tree

Osip Ivanovich Postnikov Kulush, landowner of Toropets, governor in Dankov in 1620–21.

- Timothy, Kulushov's son, in 1650–51 governor in Dankov.
- Ivan, Kulushov's son, in 1659–60 the governor in Velizh.
  - Luka Ivanovich, the steward in 1686–1703.
    - Mikhail Semenovich, grandson of the previous one, lieutenant colonel, college adviser (1753).
      - Alexander Mikhailovich, his son, Colonel, in 1802–03 the Toropetsky District leader of the nobility.
      - Matvey Mikhailovich (d. 1810), brother of the previous one, a real state adviser.
        - Mikhail Matveyevich (1787–1829), his son, lieutenant colonel, figure of Freemasonry.
  - Artemy Ivanovich, brother of Luka Ivanovich, a steward in 1687–1703.
    - Bogdan Artemievich, Guard Prime Major.
      - Alexey Bogdanovich (1744–1806), Privy Councilor, Senator; Married to Countess Varvara Ivanovna Gendrikova, second cousin of Peter III.
        - Alexander Alekseevich (d. 1822), colonel.
  - Sergei Ivanovich, brother of Luka and Artemy Ivanovich, a steward in 1689–1703.
    - Peter Ivanovich (1745–1811), the grandson of the previous one, writer and traveler.
      - Egor Alekseevich, nephew of the previous, Toropetsky district leader of the nobility (1811–12).
        - Nikolai Egorovich (1807–1866), his son, lieutenant general.
        - Vladimir Egorovich (1819–1886), general, commandant of Odessa.
        - Platon Ivanovich (1804–59), cousin of the two previous ones, major general.

== Kaluga landowners ==
Pyotr Semenovich Chelishchev, in 1600–02, the bypass head in Moscow, the grand-nephew of Ilya Mikulych.

- Ivan Petrovich, his son, was granted the estate near Maloyaroslavets for the siege of Moscow in 1610.
  - Afinogen Ivanovich, his son, a Maloyaroslavets city nobleman, was wounded near Smolensk in 1634.
    - Bogdan Afinogenovich, his son, governor in Turinsk (1690) and Ilimsk (1694).
      - Pyotr Alferyevich, the nephew of the previous one, in 1734 the Siberian provincial prosecutor.
        - Ivan Petrovich (d. 1779), his son, a court adviser, according to Konstantin Kedrov, was a Rosicrucian.

Nikita Dmitrievich, second cousin of Pyotr Semyonovich and grand-nephew of Ilya Mikulych.

- Karp Nifontovich, his great-grandson, was killed near Konotop in 1659.
  - Timofey Ignatievich (1696 – after 1774), the grandson of the previous one, the Maloyaroslavsky landowner, a retired lieutenant (1738).
    - Mikhail Alexandrovich (1778–1868), his grandson, the owner of the village of Vinkovo (Chernyshnoe), a campaigner in 1812–14, the Borovsky District leader of the nobility (1832).
      - Dmitry Mikhailovich (1812–18..), his son, state adviser; he was published in the "Hunting Journal" under the name "1st Chelishchev", and participated in the development of pedigree types of greyhounds and hounds.
        - Victor Nikolaevich (1870–1952), the grandson of the previous one, writer and memoirist.
          - Andrei Viktorovich (1901–1994), his son, one of the patriarchs of American winemaking.
    - Nikolai Mikhailovich (1774–1832), great-nephew of Timofei Ignatievich, second cousin of Mikhail Alexandrovich, in 1821–23 the Kozelsky District leader of the nobility.
      - Sergey Nikolaevich (1823–1869), in 1851–60, the Zhizdrinsky District leader of the nobility; built an existing church in the village of Ilyinsky, Kozelsky District; grave in Optina Pustyn.
        - Fedor Sergeevich (1859–1942), owner of the Dubrovka estate in Zhizdrinsky District.
          - Pavel Fedorovich (1898–1957), a famous theater émigré artist.
          - Varvara Fedorovna, taught literature to the daughter of Stalin and the granddaughter of Khrushchev, is buried with sisters in the Donskoy Monastery.
            - Konstantin Kedrov (born 1942), great-grandson of Fyodor Sergeyevich on female lines, poet.

== Metropolitan aristocracy ==
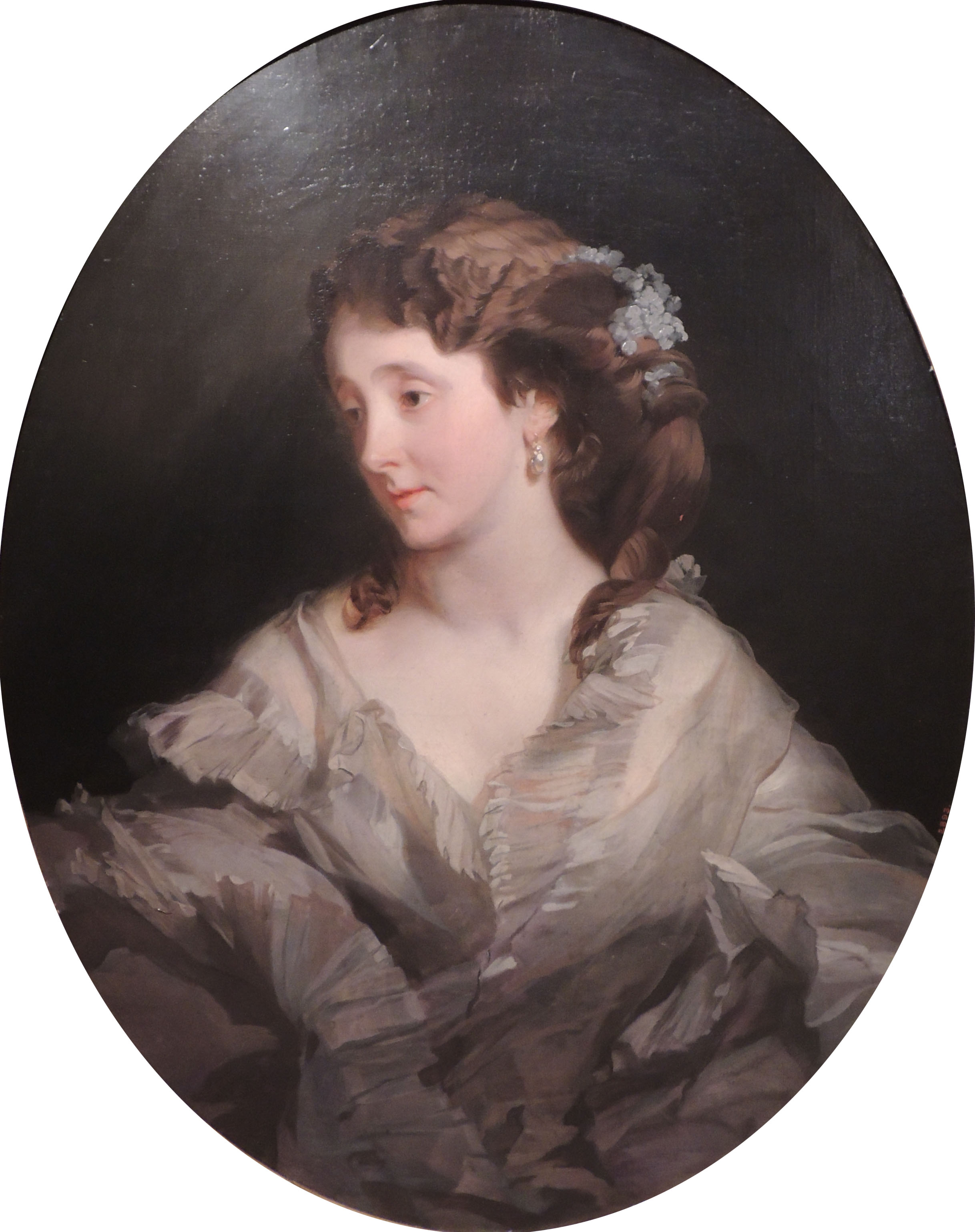
Portrait of Alexandra Chelishcheva (née Verigina) from the collection of the Tretyakov Gallery

Alexander Ivanovich (d. 1821), son of the court adviser Ivan Petrovich, lieutenant general; under Paul I, the chief chief of the Artillery Department of the Military College; Married to Maria Nikolaevna Ogaryova.

- Ekaterina Alexandrovna (1778–1857), wife of General Andrei Kologrivov (1775–1825).
- Alexander Alexandrovich (1797–1881), member of the Union of Welfare; Married to Natalya Alekseevna Pushkina.
  - Alexey Alexandrovich (1836–1894), lieutenant general; married to Alexander Andreevna Herngross.
- Nikolai Aleksandrovich (1783–1859), Full Privy Councilor, Senator, Member of the State Council; married to Princess Maria Mikhailovna Khovanskaya (1790–1846).
  - Fedor Nikolaevich (1811–1881), chamberlain; Married to Alexandra Mikhailovna Verigina.
  - Alexander Nikolaevich (1813–1836), lieutenant of the Cavalier Guard regiment.
  - Nikolai Nikolaevich (1817 – after 1884), clerk; Married to Countess Elizabeth Alexandrovna Guryeva.
    - Olga Nikolaevna (1845–1908), wife of Count Alexander Vladimirovich Sollogub.
  - Andrei Nikolaevich (1819–1902), cavalry guard, State Councilor; Married to Princess Alexander Petrovna Khovanskaya, widow of Ivan Veshnyakov.
  - Mikhail Nikolaevich (1815–1883), Privy Councilor, Hoffmeister, owner of the Saint Petersburg mansion on 31, Sergievskaya Street; married to Ekaterina Alekseevna Khomyakova.
    - Maria Mikhailovna (1843–1915), in marriage – Lvova; mother of politicians Vladimir Lvov and Nikolai Lvov.
    - Sergei Mikhailovich (1850–1917), the landowner of the village of Krasnoe near Borovsky, where he died during a manor's fire; married to Olga Stepanovna Khomyakova.
      - Alexander Chelishchev–Krasnoselsky (1881–1921), his son, a mathematician and composer from the Argonauts circle; after the revolution, he worked as a taper in the cinema at the Rybinsk railway station; wives – Yadviga Maximovna Studenitskaya and Maria Luarsabovna Abuladze (1884–1978), student of Vasily Safonov, founder of the children's music school in Rybinsk, where a memorial plaque commemorates her memory.
        - Vladimir Lindenberg (1902–1997), son of the previous one, neuropathologist, writer and memoirist.
    - Alexei Mikhailovich (1847–1889), owner of the estate Fedyashevo near Tula; married (from 1875) to Olga Alekseevna Khomyakova (1848–1932), daughter of Alexei Khomyakov.
      - Fedor Alekseevich (1879–1942), curator of the museum of Alexei Khomyakov in the village of Bogucharovo, "deeply religious, idealist philosopher, lawyer by education"; repressed; married to Olga Alexandrovna Gresser (1897–1980), granddaughter of Peter Gresser.
      - Maria Alekseevna (1886–1973), since 1919, the wife of Count Nikolai Bobrinsky.

== Sources ==
- Vitold Rummel, Vladimir Golubtsov. Genealogy Collection of Russian Noble Families. Vol. 2. pp. 657–678.
- Nikolay Chelishchev. Collection of Materials for the History of the Chelishchevs. Saint Petersburg, 1893
- Vladimir Lindenberg. Three Houses – München, 1985
- Mikhail Poddubny. Chelishchevs in the History of Russian Hunting
- Konstantin Kedrov. Chelishchev Perspective // Konstantin Kedrov. Metametaphor – Moscow: DOOS, 1999
- Konstantin Kedrov. How Angels Are Born // Konstantin Kedrov. Parallel Worlds – Moscow: AiF–Print, 2002
- Vasily Rudakov. Chelishchevs // Brockhaus and Efron Encyclopedic Dictionary: in 86 Volumes (82 Volumes and 4 Additional) – Saint Petersburg, 1890–1907
