= Truten =

Russian magazine

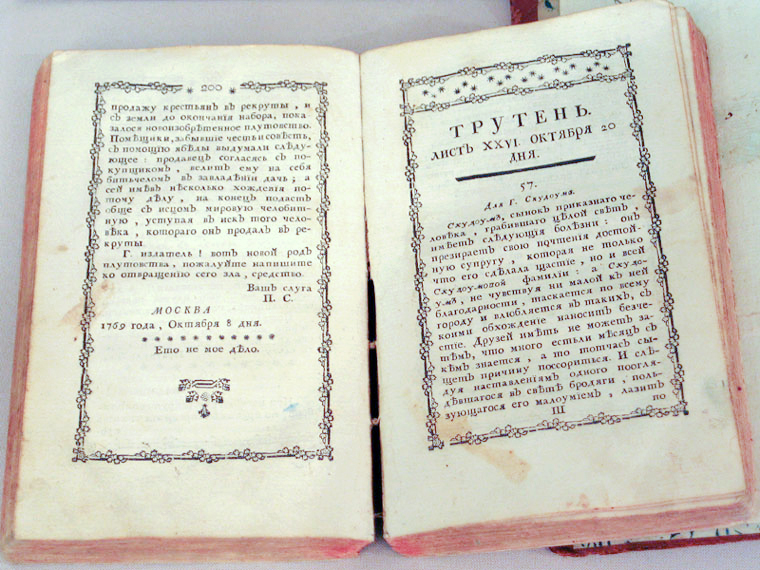
Truten

Truten (Russian: "Трутень", which may be translated as Drone) was a Russian weekly satirical magazine, published by Nikolay Novikov from May 1, 1769 to April 27, 1770 in Saint Petersburg. In 1769, there were 36 issues of the magazine and 17 in 1770.

Truten entered into polemics with the Vsyakaya vsyachina magazine, privately edited by Catherine II herself. The magazines argued about the role of satire in everyday life and its kinds. Many of the Truten articles touched upon the burning issues of the Russian society, including the status of the serfs. Most of the commentaries were published anonymously. Some of the articles are attributed to Novikov himself and Denis Fonvizin. Guest "columnists" also included Alexander Oblesimov, Vasili Maykov, M.I.Popov and others.
