= Alexander Radishchev =

Russian author (1749–1802)

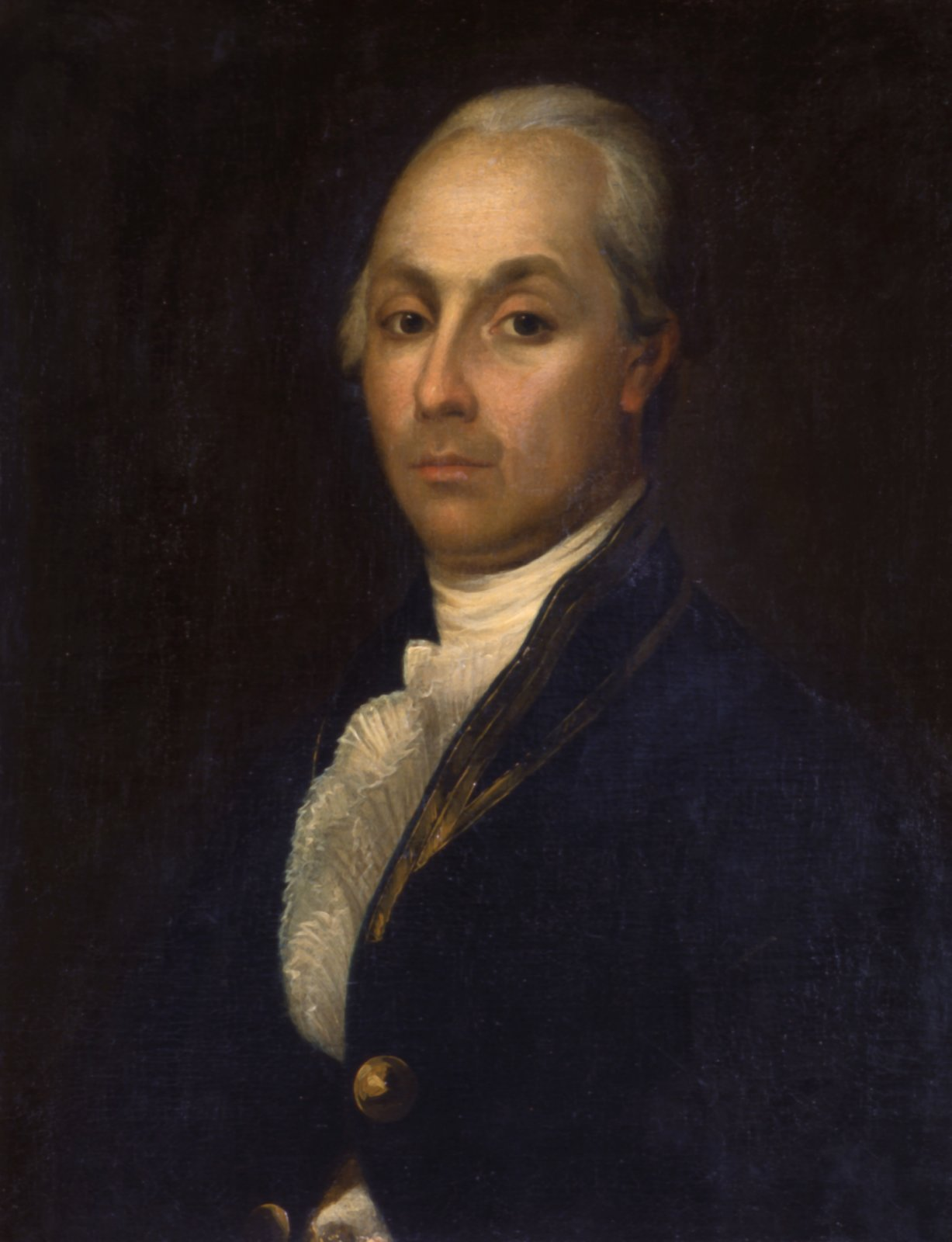
- Earlier than 1790. By unknown author
- Born: August 31, 1749; Moscow, Russia
- Died: September 24, 1802 (aged 53); Saint Petersburg, Russia
- Occupation: Writer

Alexander Nikolayevich Radishchev (Russian: Алекса́ндр Никола́евич Ради́щев; 31 August [O.S. 20 August] 1749 – 24 September [O.S. 12 September] 1802) was a Russian author and social critic who was arrested and exiled under Catherine the Great. He brought the tradition of radicalism in Russian literature to prominence with his 1790 work Journey from St. Petersburg to Moscow. His depiction of socio-economic conditions in Russia resulted in his exile to Siberia until 1797. He was the grandfather of painter Alexey Bogolyubov.

== Biography ==
Radishchev was born on an estate just outside Moscow, into a minor noble family of Tatar descent, tracing its roots back to defeated princes who entered into the service of Ivan the Terrible after the conquest of Kazan in 1552, the Tsar offering them, in exchange of baptism, to work for him and being allotted lands of some twenty-two thousand acres, a number their descendants continued to add to by serving the Tsars over the generations. His father, Nicholas Afanasevich Radishchev, a prominent landowner in Moscow, had a reputation for treating his 3000-plus serfs humanely. Until he was 8 years old he lived on his father's estate with a nurse and tutor in Verkhni Oblyazovo (then part of the Saratov Governorate, today in Penza Oblast), one hundred miles west of the Volga river.

He then went to live with a relative in Moscow, where he was allowed to spend time at the newly established Moscow University. In 1765 his family connections provided him with an opportunity to serve as a page in Catherine's court, which he regarded with suspicion for its "contempt for the Orthodox faith, and a desire to deliver the homeland into foreign (German) hands". Because of his exceptional academic promise, Radishchev was chosen as one of a dozen young students to be sent abroad to acquire Western learning. For several years he studied at the University of Leipzig. His foreign education influenced his approach to Russian society, and upon his return he hoped to incorporate Enlightenment philosophies such as natural law and the social contract into Russian conditions. Even as he served as a Titular Councillor, drafting legal protocols, in Catherine's civil service, he lauded revolutionaries like George Washington, praised the early stages of the French Revolution, and found himself enamored of the Russian Freemason, Nicholas Ivanovich Novikov, whose publication The Drone offered the first public critiques of the government, particularly with regards to serfdom. Novikov's sharp satire and indignation inspired Radishchev's most famous work – Journey from St. Petersburg to Moscow – in which he emulates Novikov's harsh and passionate style. He too was especially critical of serfdom and of the limits to personal freedom imposed by the autocracy.

The Empress Catherine the Great read the work, viewed Radishchev's calls for reform as evidence of Jacobin-style radicalism, and ordered copies of the text confiscated and destroyed. Out of the 650 copies originally printed, only 17 had survived by the time the work was reprinted in England fifty years later. In 1790 Radishchev was arrested and condemned to death. He humbly begged Catherine for forgiveness, publicly disowning his book, and his sentence was commuted to exile to the small Siberian town of Ilimsk. En route the writer was treated like a common convict, shackled at the ankles and forced to endure the Russian cold to which he eventually succumbed. His friend, Count Alexander Vorontsov, who held sway with Catherine, interceded and managed to secure Radishchev more humane accommodations, allowing him to return to Moscow to recover and restart his journey with dignity and comfort. Beginning in October 1790, Radishchev's two-year trip took him through Siberia, stopping in the towns of Yekaterinburg, Tobolsk, and Irkutsk before reaching Ilimsk in 1792. Along the way, he began writing a biography of Yermak, the Cossack conqueror of Siberia, and pursuing an interest in geology and nature. Settling in Ilimsk for five years with his second wife, Elizabeth Vasilievna Rubanovsky, and his two children, Radishchev, as the only educated man in the area, he became the local doctor and saved several lives. He also wrote a long treatise, On Man, His Mortality, His Immortality, revered as one of the few great Russian philosophical works . In it he addresses man's belief in the afterlife, the corporality of the soul, the ultimate redemption of sinners and the faults of materialism.

After Catherine's death in 1796, her successor Tsar Paul recalled Radishchev from Siberia and confined him to his own estate. The writer again attempted to push for reforms in Russia's government. When Alexander I became Emperor in 1801, Radishchev was briefly employed to help revise Russian law, a realization of his lifelong dream. Unfortunately, his tenure in this administrative role proved short and unsuccessful. In 1802, a despondent Radishchev committed suicide by drinking poison, possibly after being rebuked in a friendly manner by Count Zavadovsky for expressing radical ideas. Count Zavadosky, in his reproof, spoke of another exile to Siberia.

== Legacy ==
During the author's last years, his Moscow apartment became the center of several literary circles who extolled similar views and most outspokenly mourned his death. The Russian autocracy, however, managed to prevent A Journey from St. Petersburg to Moscow from being published until 1905, during which time it circulated through radical groups and was translated into several languages. Alexander Pushkin, sympathetic to Radishchev's views and passion, undertook to write a sequel to his inflammatory book, which was unfortunately never finished and early on faced pressure from the censors. Following the 1905 and 1917 revolutions, however, Radishchev was accepted into the radical canon and became widely read throughout Russia and Europe. Despite the discrepancies between the author's ideal and the Soviet reality, authorities managed to paint him as "a materialist, an active fighter against autocratic tyranny, and a veritable forefather of Bolshevism."

== Works ==
- Радищев, Александр Николаевич (1807). Собраніе оставшихся сочиненій покойнаго Александръ Николаевича Радищева [Collection of Literary Remains of the Deceased Alexander Nikolaevich Radishchev] (in Russian). Vol. I. Moscow: Платонъ Бекетовъ.

== Views ==
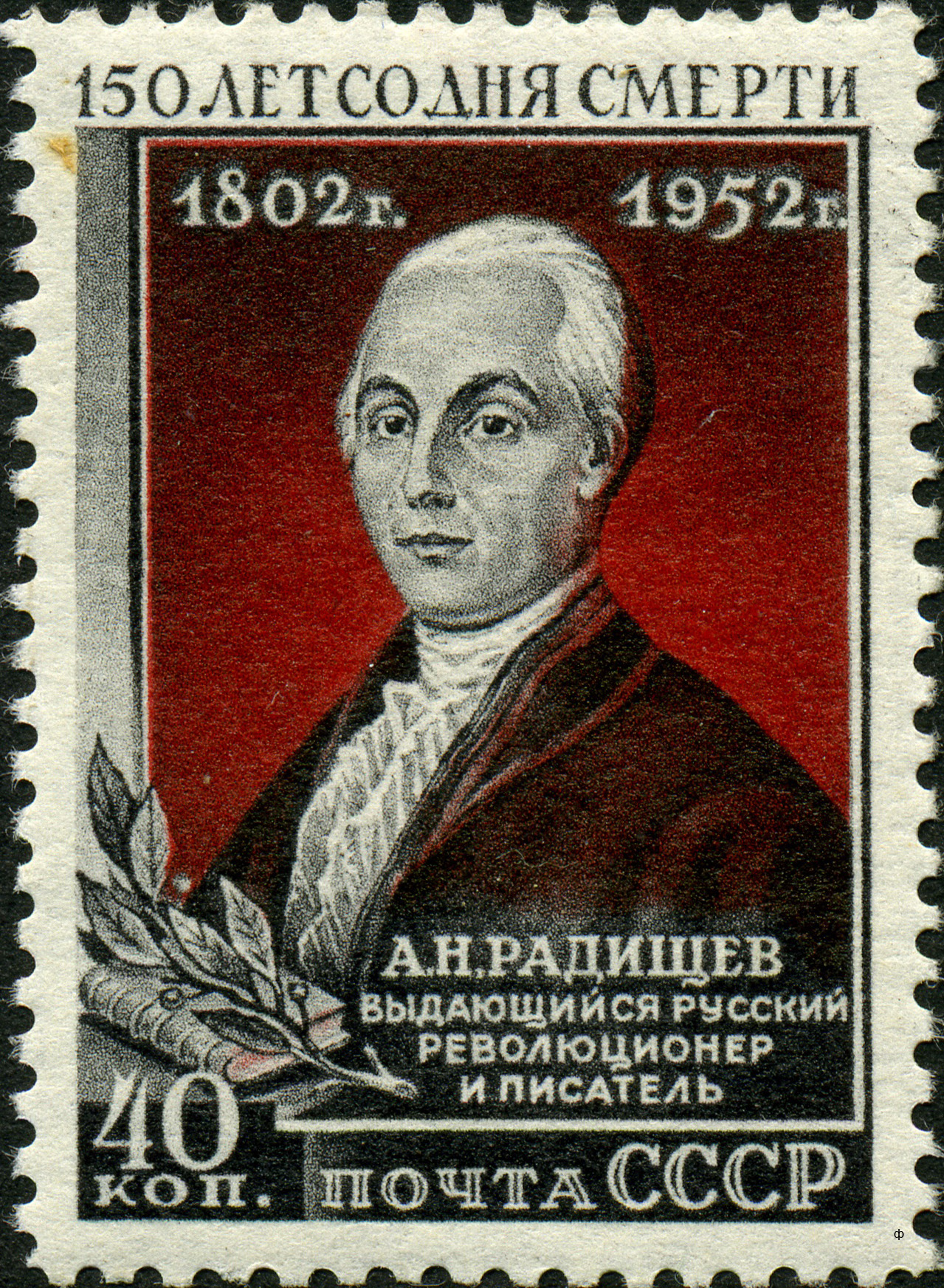
Radishchev on a 1952 postage stamp

As a true student of the Enlightenment, Radishchev held views that favored the freedom of the individual, Humanism, and patriotism. These values are best summed up by “equality of all classes before the law, abolition of the Table of Ranks, trial by jury, religious toleration, freedom of the press, emancipation of manorial serfs, habeas corpus, and freedom of trade”. Upon his return from Leipzig in 1771, Radishchev saw with fresh eyes the stark contrast between life under liberal Western states like England and Switzerland and that under Russia's autocracy. Echoing the sentiments of Catherine herself, he advocated education for all classes, a system he had the fortune to witness in a school in Irkutsk. A more educated populace would provide the foundation for an eventual republican or parliamentary system. Of all of Russia's social ills, Radishchev especially despised the inequality and prolongation of serfdom, rooted in a traditional social system that enforced a strict hierarchy and permitted abuses and exploitation. Ironically, under Catherine's enlightened reign, serfdom was intensified and spread to newly conquered territories. While in Siberia, Radishchev's economic thought developed, not only in terms of decreasing dependence on serfdom but denouncing international trade. Though influenced by Adam Smith, Radishchev maintained protectionist views, condemning unnecessary international trade and proposing stronger domestic production. In the debate over Sino-Russian trade relations, he believed Russia's own resources were enough to support it.

Criticizing the history of arbitrary rule in Russia, Radishchev called autocracy the system of governance "most contrary to human nature". Under this system, government was better positioned to breach its social contract with the governed, creating an unjust and oppressed society. He extends this system to master-serf relations as well, noting that seeking unlimited power is a natural human vice. Radishchev does not sweepingly criticize all autocrats, but only tyrants, praising, in fact, Lycurgus, the philosopher king of Sparta who promoted equality and civil rights. Radishchev, however, did not believe in, or desire, bloody revolution and instead hoped for a reforming autocrat who would abolish serfdom and "maintain equality in society, protect the widow and the orphan and save the innocent from harm." As a member of the ruling class, he did not seek to overturn autocracy but to persuade his countrymen and superiors to give up some of their vested power. In no way an idealist, the writer acknowledged that "where there was more enlightenment, where there was more social life, there was more corruption, so inseparable are good and evil on the earth."

Radishchev's religious and philosophical views were incredibly liberal for his time. Denying the belief that sensory experience is primary, Radishchev, in On Man, His Mortality, His Immortality, speaks in favor of man's higher virtues as the main elements in complex human thought. He believed that man's hereditary faculties have as much influence on his development as the external environment. He also points out, however, that there are common, innate traits that bind all people, particularly the belief in a higher power. The belief in immortality remains particularly potent for him, both as a factor of faith and as a solace amidst the difficulties of life.

== English translations ==
- A Journey From St. Petersburg to Moscow, Cambridge: Harvard University Press, 1958. Translated by Leo Wiener. Edited with an introduction and notes by Roderick Page Thaler.
- A Journey From St. Petersburg to Moscow, Columbia University Press, 2020 (The Russian Library). Translated by Andrew Kahn and Irina Reyfman.

== See also ==
- Decembrist revolt
- Ivan Pnin
