= Kara (Shilka tributary) =

Location
- Country: Russia

Physical characteristics
- Mouth: Shilka
  - coordinates: 52.716419°N 118.829841°E
- Length: 37 km (23 mi)

Basin features
- Progression: Shilka→ Amur→ Sea of Okhotsk

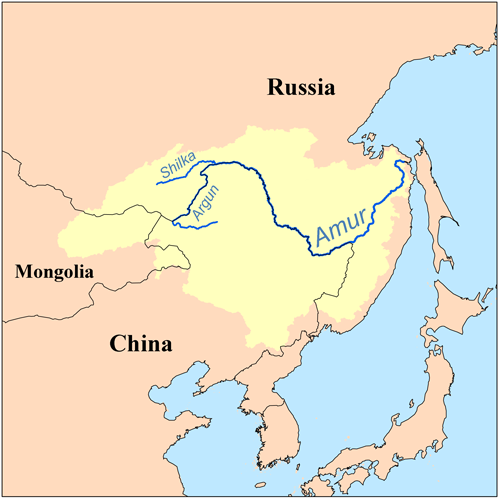
Amur watershed

The Kara is a river in Transbaikalia, in Eastern Siberia. It is a left tributary of the Shilka, with the mouth at Ust-Karsk. It is 37 kilometres (23 mi) long.

In 1832 gold was found by the Kara. The deposit by the river was one of the richest in Transbaikalia. To man the gold mines, the system of Kara katorga prisons (1830–98) was established.
