= Kara katorga =

Set of 19th-century Russian katorga prisons along the Kara River in Transbaikalia

Coordinates: 52°42′54″N 118°49′12″E

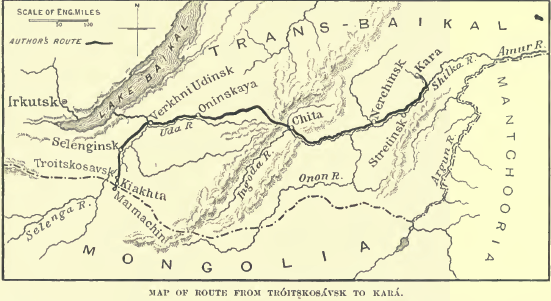
Location of Kara, from George Kennan's route there in 1885

Kara katorga (Russian: Карийская каторга, romanized: Kariyskaya katorga) was a set of katorga prisons of extremely high security located along the Kara River in Transbaikalia (a tributary of the Shilka River, flowing into it at Ust-Karsk) and part of the system of Nerchinsk katorga.

== History ==
George Kennan noted in 1885, "The mines of Kara, which are the private property of his Imperial Majesty the Tsar, and are worked for his benefit, consist of a series of open gold placers." From south to north over 20 miles of the Kara River, they are Ust Kara, Lower Prison, Political Prison, Lower Diggings, Middle Kara, Upper Kara, and the Upper or Amurski Prison. The governor resided in the administrative center at Lower Diggings along with a company of soldiers and up to 300 convicts. The entire settlement area contained 1800 hard-labor convicts.

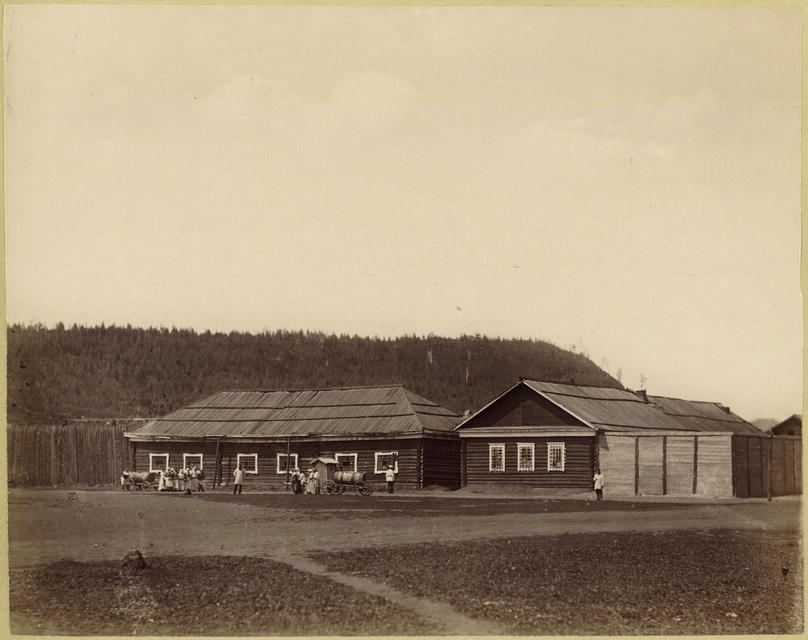
Ust-Kara prison in 1891.

It existed from 1838 to 1893. During 1873-1890 it held political prisoners. It was closed down because of the Kara Tragedy of 1889.

The inmates of Kara katorga were used in gold mining work. Gold was found by the Kara River in 1832. The first rich lode, suitable for exploitation was found in 1838, giving rise to the Lower Kara Field (Нижне-карийский прииск). In 1839, the Upper Kara Field was discovered, and the Middle Kara Field in 1852. The Kara field turned out to be one of the richest in Transbaikalia, at their peak delivering 1 tonne of gold yearly.

The majority of workers were criminal convicts, up to 2,000 in number. After national-liberation movements in Poland and Lithuania were suppressed, Polish and Lithuanian insurgents were sent to the Kara katorga. The first small group was sent there after the Polish uprising of 1830-1831. However, the majority of political convicts were Polish insurgents of 1863, about 180 persons. Later a number of Russian revolutionaries were sent there, the majority being members of the Narodnaya Volya organization. In total, 185 men and 32 women were political prisoners at Kara katorga.

== Kara tragedy ==
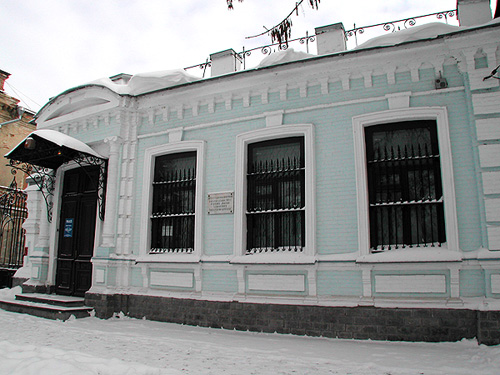
Former underground print shop in Taganrog.

Political prisoners enjoyed certain privileges in comparison to criminals. The Katorga administration decided to abolish them, that in combination of harsh treatment of the women convicts, resulted in hunger strikes in protest. Eventually, the governor-general Andrei Korf ordered corporal punishment for a female prisoner of the Ust-Kara settlement. She was Nadezhda Sigida, a 27 year old convict arrested in 1886 for being a member of Narodnaya Volya and establishing an underground printing shop in Taganrog. After being flogged on November 7, 1889 (Julian calendar), next night she and Kalyuzhnaya, Smyrnytska, and Kovalevska killed themselves with morphine. On November 12, 1889 (Julian calendar) 16 political prisoners in male section of the prison also attempted suicide taking opiates. All this resulted in death of 6 convicts in total, 4 women and 2 men.

This event stirred a public outcry. As a consequence, the political prison of the Kara katorga was closed, and the use of corporal punishment against imprisoned women was abolished by the law of 28 March 1893.

Russian artist Nikolay Kasatkin (Николай Алексеевич Касаткин) painted the picture Kara Tragedy (1930).

== Notable prisoners ==
- Sergei Bobokhov, Russian revolutionary, who committed suicide as a protest against the flogging of woman comrade in Siberia.
- Nikolai Ishutin, one of the first Russian utopian socialists.
- Maria Kalyuzhnaya, Ukrainian Narodnik
- Anna Pribylyova-Korba, Russian revolutionary
- Maria Kovalevska, Ukrainian Narodnik
- Maria Kutitonskaya, Ukrainian Narodnik
- Nadezhda Sigida, Russian revolutionary
- Nadia Smyrnytska, Ukrainian Narodnik
