= Nikolay Kasatkin =

Russian painter

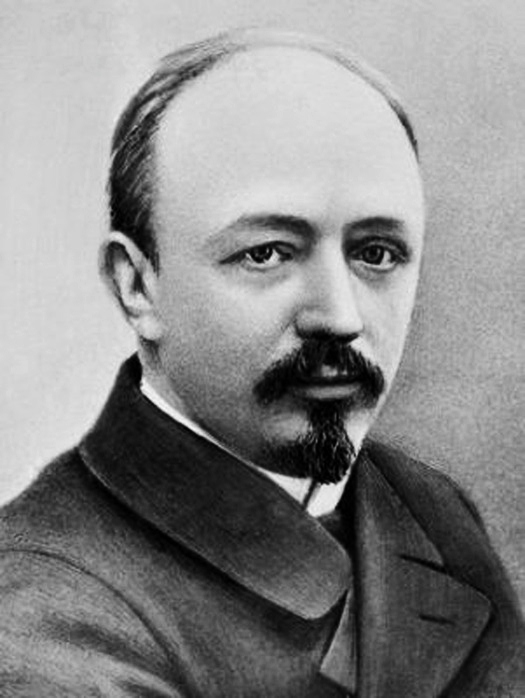
Nikolay Kasatkin (c.1890)

Nikolay Alekseyevich Kasatkin (Russian: Никола́й Алексе́евич Каса́ткин; 13 December 1859, Moscow – 17 December 1930, Moscow) was a Russian painter; considered to be one of the founders of Social Realism in Russia.

== Biography ==
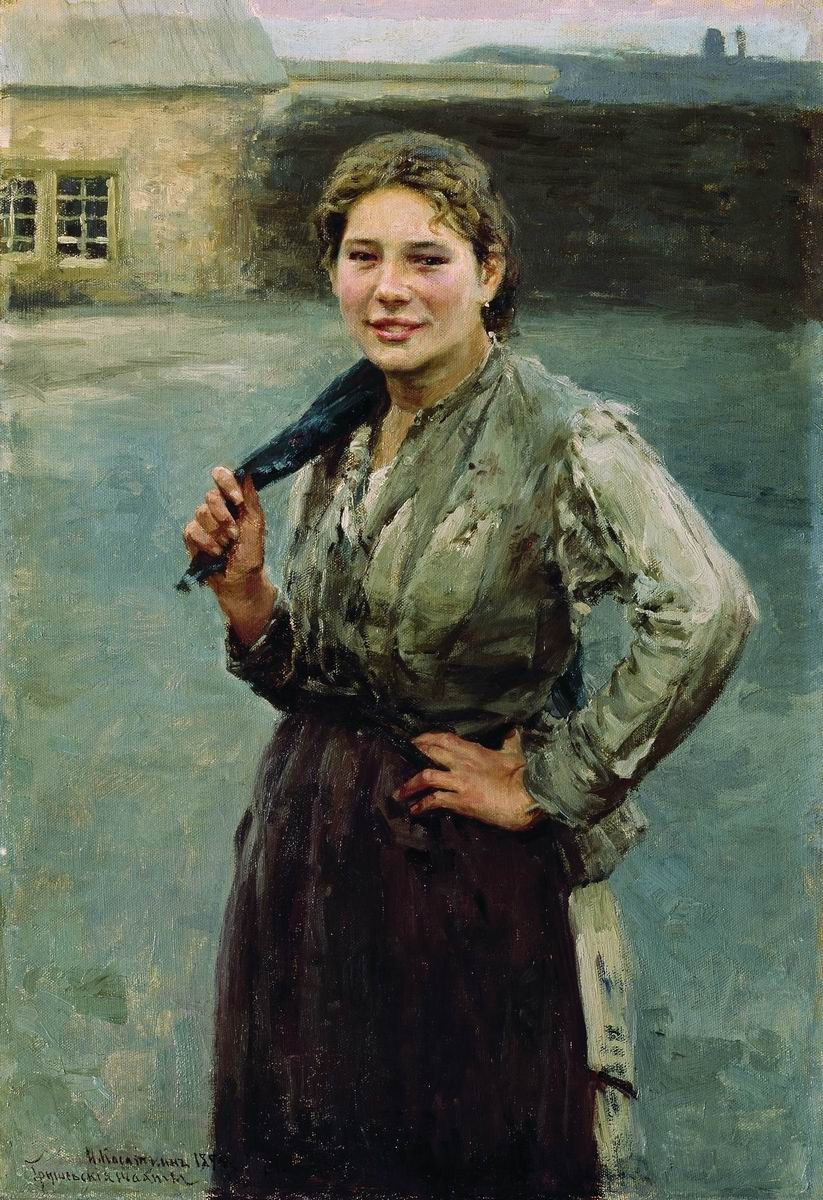
Mine Worker (1897), used on a postage stamp in 1971

His father was an engraver and lithographer. From 1873 to 1883 he studied at the Moscow School of Painting, Sculpture and Architecture with Vasily Perov and Illarion Pryanishnikov. Upon graduating, he received a medal for his painting "Beggars at the Church Door".

In 1891, he began exhibiting with the Peredvizhniki and, from 1894 to 1917, was a teacher at his alma mater. For thirty years, beginning in 1883, he worked with Ivan Sytin, providing illustrations for his popular almanac/calendars and teaching lithography. He also contributed to Великая реформа (The Great Reform), an encyclopedia that celebrated the fiftieth anniversary of the Emancipation, and a collection called "Russian History in Pictures".

In 1903, he became a member of the Imperial Academy of Arts. He participated in the Exposition Universelle (1900), where he won a silver medal, and the Louisiana Purchase Exposition (1904), among others. The following year he produced a series of works inspired by the Revolution of 1905.

After the October Revolution, his school was closed and later incorporated into "Svomas" as the "Second Free Art Studio". He continued teaching, however, for the Department of Education of the Sokolniki District Council. In 1923, following the Civil War, he was named the first "People's Artist of the Republic" and became a member of the AKhRR (Association of Artists).

In 1924, he went to England to document the lives of the proletariat there. Two years later, he created portraits for the "Museum of the Revolution" (since 1998, the "Central State Museum of Contemporary History"). He is considered to be one of the forerunners of Socialist Realism in the arts and was sometimes called the "Gorky of Painters".

He died suddenly while giving a presentation of his latest painting at the above Museum. In 1956, the Soviet Union honored him with a 40 kopeck commemorative postage stamp. In 1971, his painting of a female mine worker was featured on a 6 kopeck stamp as part of a series of works by Soviet artists. A street in Moscow has been named after him.

== Selected paintings ==
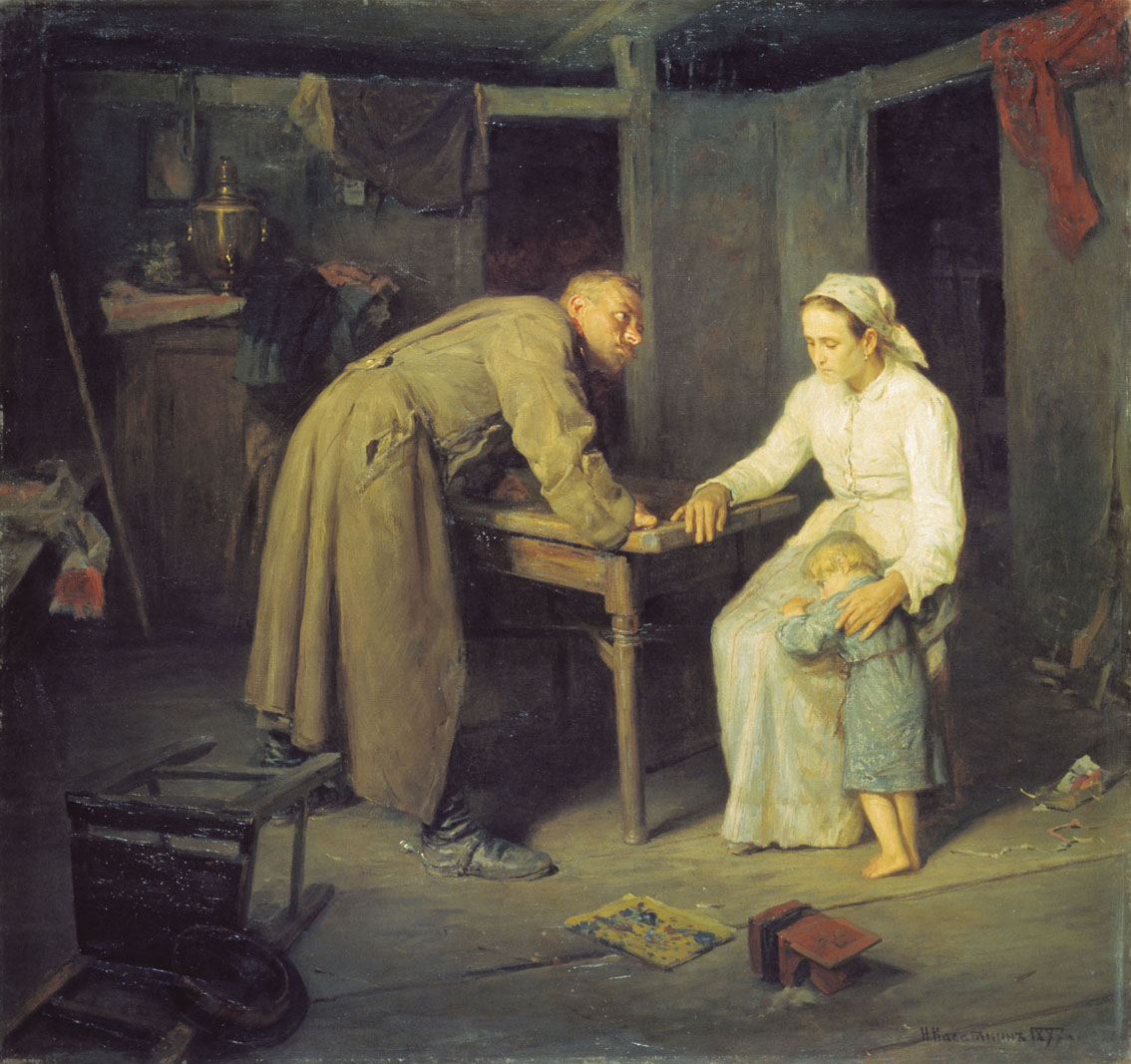
Who?

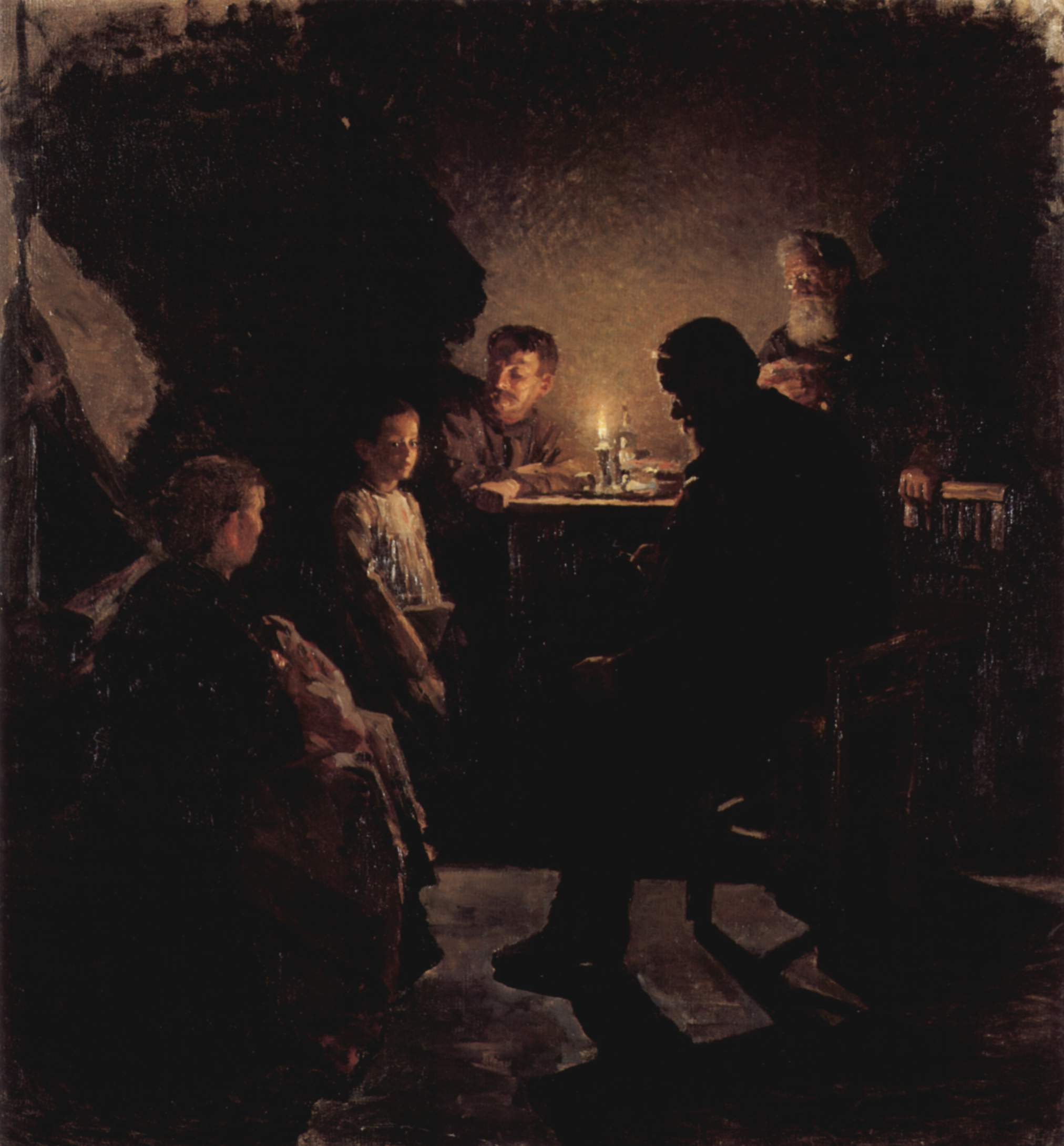
A Worker's Family

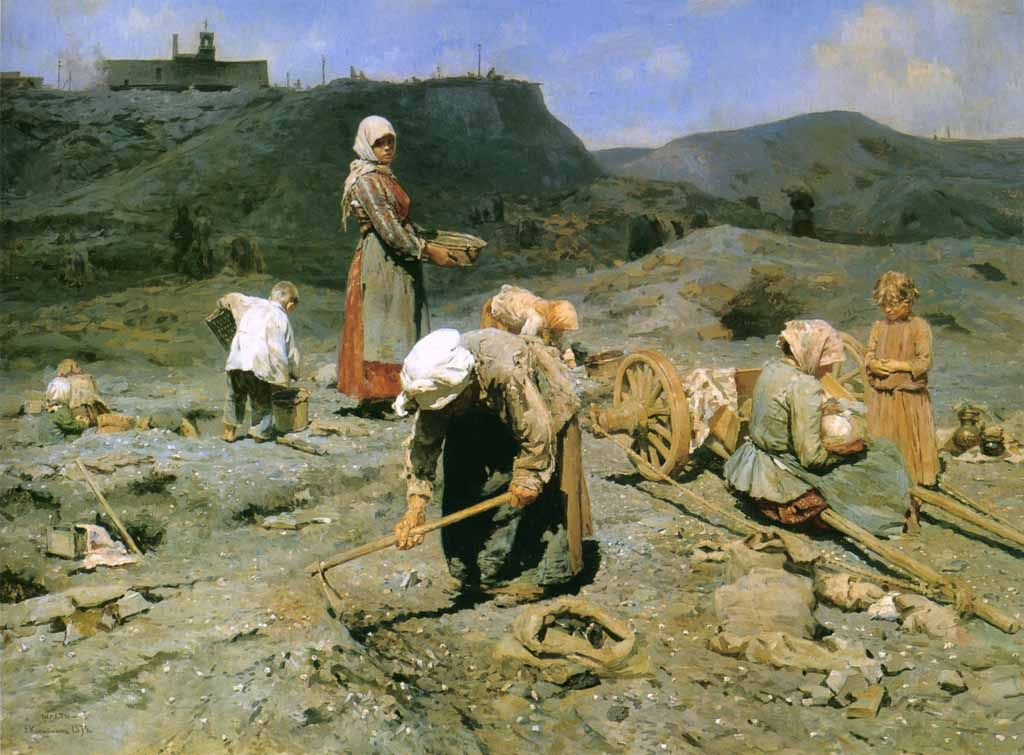
The Poor, Picking up
Pieces of Coal

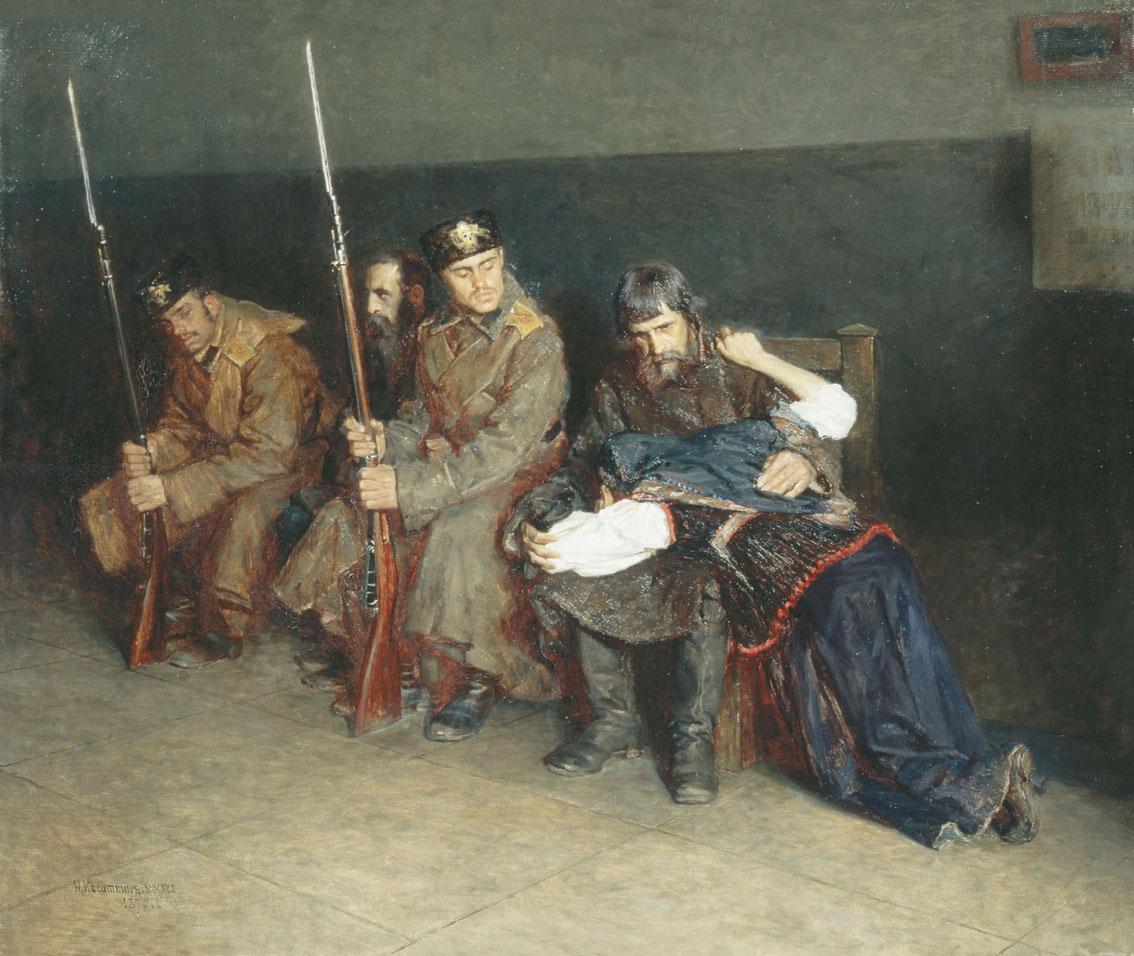
In the Corridor of
the District Court
