= Maria Kovalevska =

Ukrainian Narodnik (1849–1889)

- Марія Ковалевська
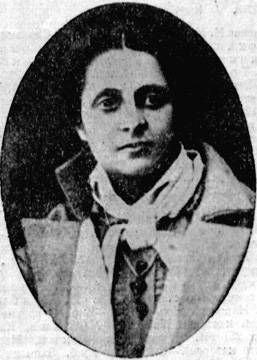
- Kovalevska (1879)
- Born: Maria Pavlivna Vorontsova; August 1849; Katerynoslav, Russian Empire
- Died: 19 November 1889 (aged 40); Kara katorga, Transbaikal, Russian Empire
- Cause of death: Poisoning
- Spouse: Mykola Kovalevsky

Maria Pavlivna Kovalevska (Ukrainian: Марія Павлівна Ковалевська; (Note: Also known by the Russian: Мария Павловна Ковалевская, romanized: Maria Pavlovna Kovalevskaya) August 1849 – 19 November 1889) was a Ukrainian Narodnik. A revolutionary activist from an early age, she became involved with Narodnik circles in Odesa, Kyiv and Kharkiv. She was arrested several times for her activities, before finally being exiled to Siberia in 1879. She spent the last decade of her life between several Siberian prisons, where she and other women prisoners were tortured. In protest, she poisoned herself and died in Kara katorga.

== Biography ==
Maria Pavlivna Kovalevska (née Vorontsova) was born in August 1849, in the Katerynoslav province of the Russian Empire.

She graduated from school in Odesa, where she joined a Narodnik revolutionary circle in 1874. She then moved to Kyiv and the Kharkiv, where she was part of other revolutionary circles. While negotiating for closer relations between Kyiv and Kharkiv revolutionaries, she was arrested, tried and found guilty of propaganda. On 20 May [O.S. 8 May] 1876, she was released from prison under close surveillance, with threats of exile should she continue her revolutionary activities. On 1 July [O.S. 19 June] 1876, she was arrested en route to Shpola with a fake passport, but managed to escape custody.

On 23 February [O.S. 11 February] 1879, she was arrested again in Kyiv, together with other members of the city's revolutionary circle. On 16 May [O.S. 4 May] 1879, she was prosecuted by the Kyiv district court, which exiled her to Siberia for 14 years of penal labour. She was transferred through Moscow to the Kara katorga, where she arrived in 1880. The following year she was transferred to a prison in Krasnoyarsk; the year after that, she was taken back to Kara; and the year after that, she was taken to prison in Irkutsk. In 1887, she was again taken back to Kara, where she and other women prisoners were tortured. Together with Nadezhda Sigida, on 19 November [O.S. 7 November] 1889, Kovalevska took poison in protest and died.

== Bibliography ==
- Lysenko, Oleksandr Vasylovych (2007). "КОВАЛЕВСЬКА Марія Павлівна" [KOVALEVSKA Maria Pavlivna]. In Smoliy, Valeriy (ed.). Encyclopedia of History of Ukraine (in Ukrainian). Vol. 4. Kyiv: National Academy of Sciences of Ukraine. pp. 374–375. ISBN 978-966-00-0692-8. OCLC 56112443.
- Shilov, A. A.; Karnaukhova, M. G., eds. (1930). "Ковалевская (Воронцова), Мария Павловна" [Kovalevskaya (Vorontsova), Maria Pavlovna]. Деятели революционного движения в России (in Russian). Vol. 2. Moscow: Society of Former Political Prisoners and Exiled Settlers. pp. 596–597. OCLC 749336544.
