= Belarusians in Russia =

Major ethnic group in Russia

Belarusians in Russia Белорусы России Беларусы Расіі
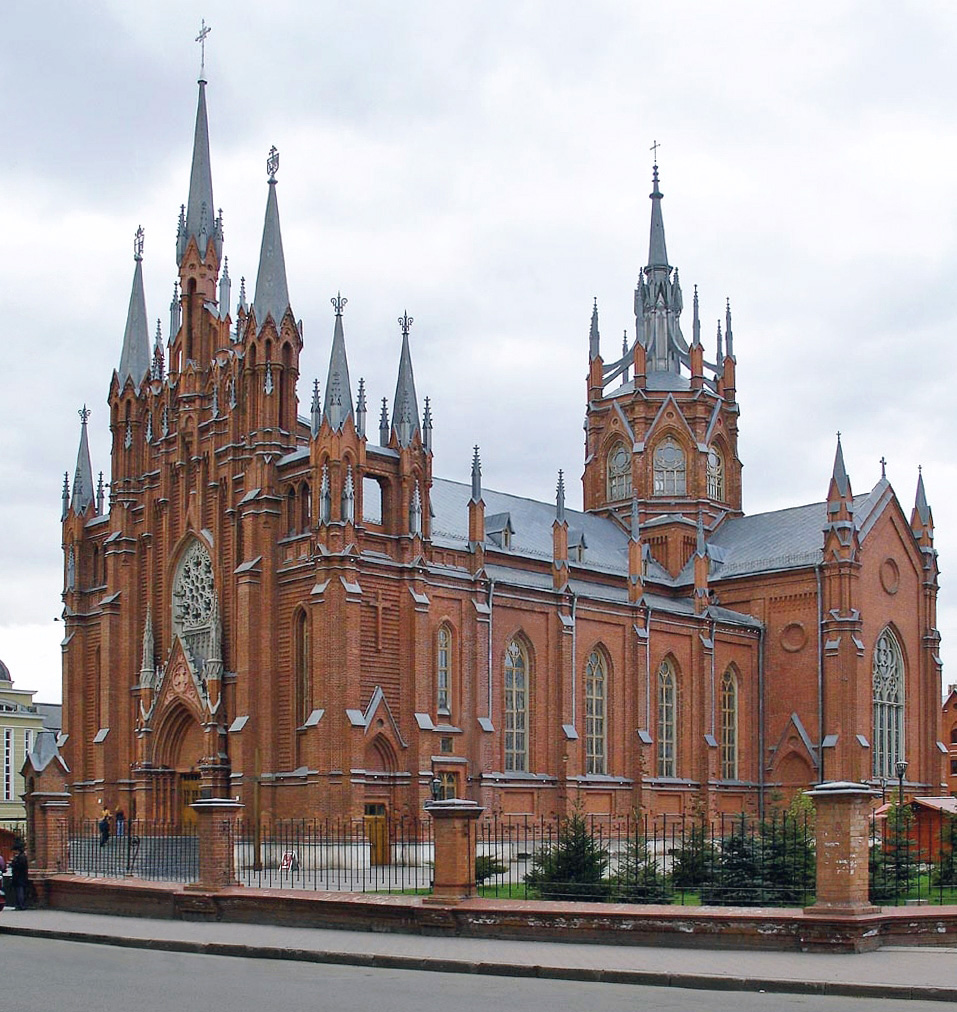
- The Cathedral of the Immaculate Conception of the Holy Virgin Mary in Moscow, built in 1899-1911 by the Vitebsk-born architect Tomasz Bohdanowicz-Dworzecki

Total population
- 208,046 (2021)

Languages
- Russian · Belarusian

Religion
- Eastern Orthodox Church (52%) · Roman Catholicism (1.3%)

Related ethnic groups
- Other Belarusians, Russians, Ukrainians, Poles

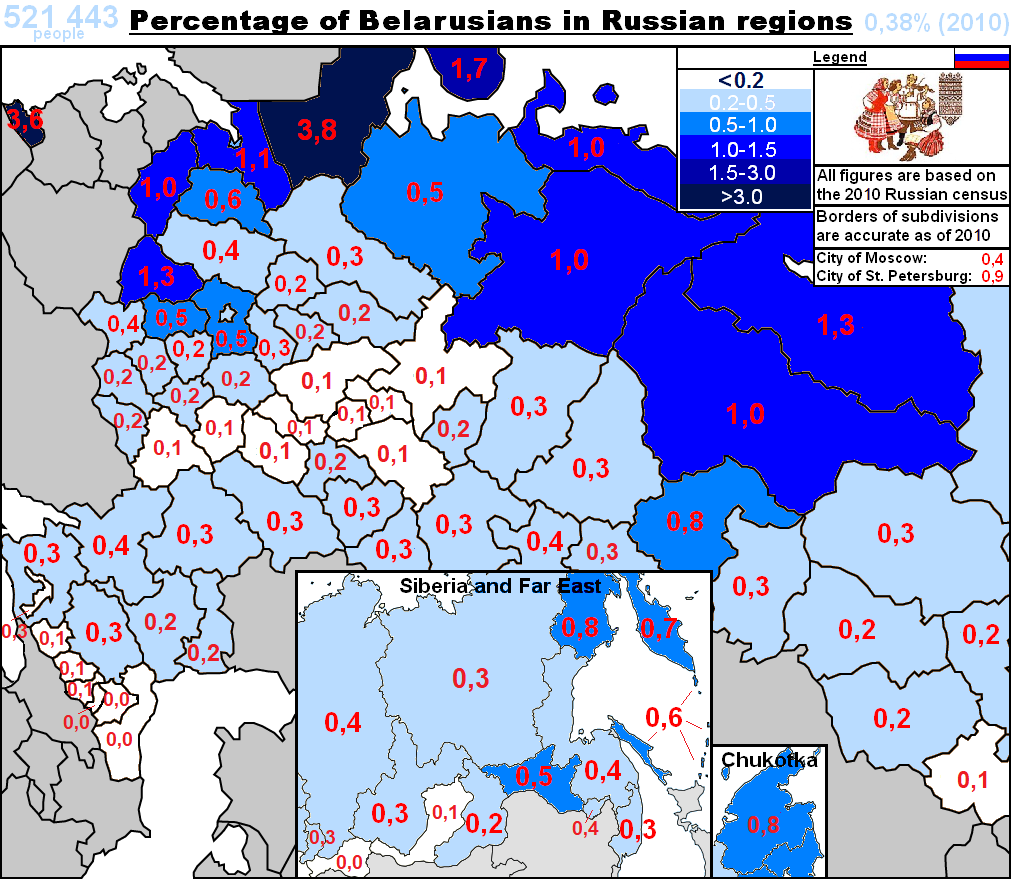
Share of Belarusians in regions of Russia, 2010 census

Belarusians are a major ethnic group in Russia. At the census of 2021, 208,046 Russian citizens indicated Belarusian ancestry. Major Belarusian groups live in the regions of Moscow, St. Petersburg, Kaliningrad, Karelia and Siberia. Most Belarusians in Russia are migrants from modern Belarus or their descendants, while a minor part of Belarusians in Russia are indigenous.

Because of cultural closeness of Belarusians to Russians and weakly expressed national identity, Belarusians are more than other ethnic minorities exposed to assimilation in Russia. Despite mass inflow of migrants from Belarus during last centuries, children of immigrants rarely identify themselves as Belarusians.

== Geography ==
A minor part of Belarusians in Russia are original inhabitants of the Russian-Belarusian border regions. In ancient times the regions of Smolensk and Pskov were inhabited by the East Slavic tribe of Krivichi that later became major base of the Russian and Belarusian nations.

According to the census of the Russian Empire, some Belarusians lived in the territories of modern Smolensk Oblast, Bryansk Oblast. A small number of Belarusians used to live in the modern Kaluga Oblast, Pskov Oblast, Orel Oblast.

The Korenization policies of the 1920s encouraged Belarusians of Russia to promote and develop Belarusian cultural life and education. A system of Belarusian schools was established in Western Russia. In the 1930s, the Korenization was reversed and its proponents were repressed.

=== Moscow ===
During the Polonization of the Grand Duchy in the 16th and 17th centuries, a large number of Orthodox Ruthenians, led by Princes Mstislavsky, Belsky and Galitzine, escaped the repressions to Moscow. In documents of that time they are also called Litvins or White Ruthenians.

One of the compact settlements of Litvins in Moscow was the Meschanskaya Sloboda. Its inhabitants engaged in financial operations, trade, and medicine. Meschanskaya Sloboda had a degree of self-governance and a collegiate church.

In the times of Imperial Russia and the USSR, Moscow as the scientific and economic centre of the country attracted many specialists from different parts of the empire including Belarus. So, the minister of foreign affairs of the USSR during the most tensed period of the Cold War was the Belarusian Andrei Gromyko.

=== St. Petersburg ===
After the Partition of Poland, Belarusians started migrating to Russia including the imperial capital, St. Petersburg. Especially many peasants from northern and eastern regions of Belarus migrated to St. Petersburg.

According to statistics, from 1869 to 1910 the number of Belarusians in St. Petersburg grew 23 times and reached 70,000. By the end of that period Belarusians were the biggest ethnic minority in the city. During the First World War for some period up to one million Belarusians lived in the city because of inflow of refugees.

In the second half of the 19th century, several Belarusian organisations were created in St. Petersburg uniting intellectuals and students. In 1868 the enlightenment organisation Kryvitski Vazok was founded. In the 1880s the organisation of leftist Belarusian intellectuals Homan was created. Along with Wilno, St. Petersburg has been the centre of Belarusian cultural an intellectual life in the late 19th century. A Belarusian publishing house existed in St. Petersburg in 1906-1912. Belarusian scientists at the universities of St. Petersburg made important ethnographic researches about Belarus.

The activity of organisations of Belarusian diaspora continued after the October Revolution until it was violently stopped by Stalinist repressions.

During the Perestroika, several new Belarusian diaspora organisations appeared in Leningrad. Today St. Petersburg, though less than Moscow, is also attractive for workers and students from Belarus.

== Other regions ==
In the 18th century Belarusians lived in several governorates of European Russia. Belarusian settlements existed in Kursk, Penza governorates and in the Ural.

After the cancellation of serfdom in Russia in the 19th century, mass migrations of Belarusian peasants to Russia started. The main destinations were the Volga region, the Caucasus, Central Asia and Siberia.

From the late 1940s to the early 1960s many Belarusians settled in the Republic of Karelia, Arkhangelsk Oblast, the Komi Republic, and Kaliningrad Oblast.

== Belarusian territorial autonomies in Russia ==
Belarusian national revival in RSFSR in early Soviet times included creation of Belarusian local autonomies - national Rural Soviets (Belarusian: сялянскія рады, romanized: sialianskija rady) inside raions. In 1924–1926, 71 Belarusian rural soviets were created in Siberia. In 1926 there were 26 Belarusian rural soviets in the Russian Far East. In the Ural in 1928 there were eleven. Later, several Belarusian raions, administrative units of a higher level, were created. In the early 1930s there was a Belarusian national raion of Taboryn as part of the Ural oblast. There was a discussion about the creation of a Belarusian national unit inside the Omsk oblast.

In the mid-1930s all Belarusian autonomies inside the RSFSR were liquidated.

== Modern state ==
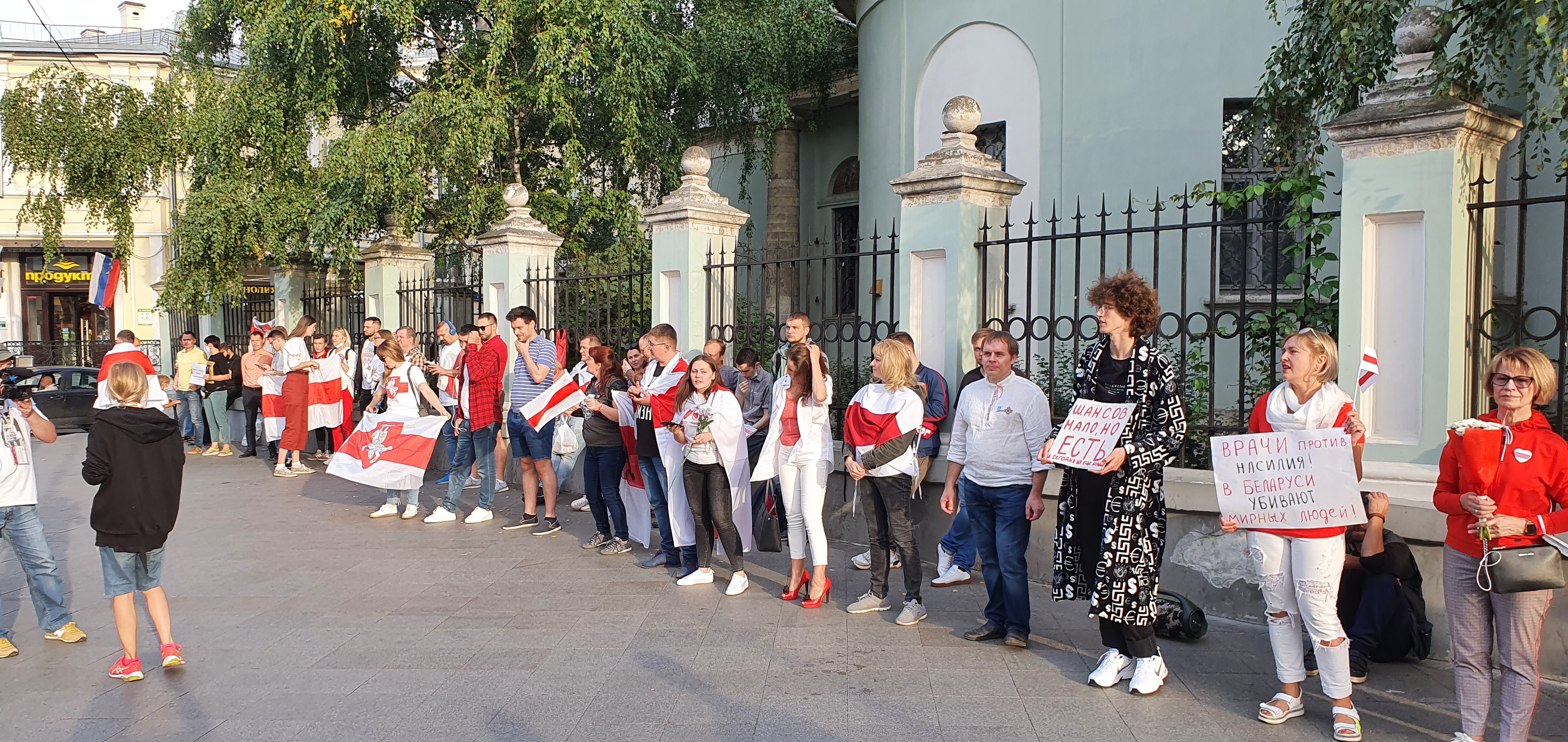
Belarusians protesting against the regime of Alexander Lukashenko in front of the Embassy of Belarus, Moscow, in September 2020

Number of Belarusians in Russia

Year	Population
1959	844,000
1970	964,700
1989	1,206,000
2002	807,970
2010	521,443

Currently, more and more Belarusian organisations are created in different regions of Russia.

In 2003 a Belarusian cultural society Belorusy Yugry was registered in Surgut.

The largest and strongest Belarusian diaspora organisation in Russia is the Jan Čerski Society for Belarusian Culture in Irkutsk. The organisation unites descendants of Belarusian settlers in Siberia, and has several branches and issues a newspaper.

In Moscow there is the Frantsishak Skaryna Society for Belarusian Culture and an informal union of Belarusian students. In Bashkortostan there is a Belarusian national cultural centre Siabry founded in 1996. In Kaliningrad Belarusians are united in the culture society Karalaviec.

In the last decade Belarusian community of Russia is of separate opinion on the current presidency of Alexander Lukashenko. Some organisations support the democratic opposition. Other, more recently founded organisations as the Federal National Cultural Autonomy of Belarusians in Russia are supported by the embassy of Belarus, and have a more positive opinion on the policies of the government.

Besides Russian citizens of Belarusian descent, there are about 400 thousands Belarusians currently working in Russia.

== Notable Belarusians in Russia ==
- Symeon of Polotsk, academically-trained Baroque poet, dramatist, churchman, and enlightener
- Fyodor Dostoyevsky, writer, descendant of a Polesian szlachta family
- Andrey Dostoevsky, architect, engineer, memoirist, and building restorer
- Lyubov Dostoevskaya - writer and memoirist
- Sofya Kovalevskaya, Russian mathematician who made noteworthy contributions to analysis, partial differential equations and mechanics.
- Dmitry Shostakovich, composer, descendant of a participant of the November uprising
- Several Russian noble families (Trubetskoy, Belsky,Svyatopolk-Mirsky and others) were originally Belarusian szlachta that fled to Muscovy
- Pavel Yaguzhinsky, statesman and diplomat, associate of Peter the Great, Chamberlain (1712),[1] Ober-Stallmeister (1727), General-in-chief (1727), the first Attorney General in Russian history (1722–1726, 1730–1735)
- Sergey Yaguzhinsky, Chamberlain, lieutenant general (1764), owner of the Sylvinsky and Utkinsky factories, as well as a cloth factory in Pavlovskaya Sloboda
- Pavel Sukhoi, constructor and designer
- Nikolai Nikolayevich Yudenich, commander of the Russian Imperial Army during World War I, leader of the anti-communist White movement in Northwestern Russia during the Civil War
- Evgeny Radkevich - Imperial Russian Army general of the infantry and a member of the Military Council
- Nikolai Sukhozanet - Imperial Russian Army general and statesman
- Vladimir May-Mayevsky - military leader who was a general in the Imperial Russian Army and one of the leaders of the counterrevolutionary White movement during the Russian Civil War
- Andrey Vilkitsky, hydrographer and surveyor
- Boris Vilkitsky - hydrographer and surveyor
- Osip Kozlovsky - composer
- Iosif Goshkevich, an Imperial Russian diplomat and Orientalist
- Konstantin Staniukovich - writer, remembered today mostly for his stories of the Russian Imperial Navy
- Ivan Solonevich - philosopher, historian, writer, editor, publisher, publicist and conservative political activist.
- Pavel Malyantovich -Minister of Justice of the Provisional Government (1917), Supreme Prosecutor of Russia (1917).
- Boris Vilkitsky, Russian hydrographer and surveyor.
- Lev Dovator, Soviet major-general during WW2
- Stepan Chernyak - Soviet Army general and Hero of the Soviet Union who held field army and division command during World War II, rising to the rank of general-leytenant
- Yefim Baranovich - Imperial Russian and Soviet career military officer whose service spanned the Russo-Japanese War, World War I, the Russian Civil War and the concurrent Polish-Soviet War, and World War II
- Vladimir Kovalyonok - retired Soviet cosmonaut
- Anatoly Lesun - deputy of the 8th State Duma
- Anatoly Sliva - judge of the Constitutional Court of Russia from 1998 to 2010, Plenipotentiary Representative of the President of Russia [ru] to the Federation Council from 1996 to 1998
- Nikolay Tsed - political figure, deputy of the 8th State Duma
- Dmytro Ivanisenya - professional footballer who plays as a defensive midfielder for Krylia Sovetov Samara
- Marina Yurchenya - Soviet former breaststroke swimmer who competed in the 1976 Summer Olympics
- Mikhail Khodaryonok - journalist, military observer for Gazeta.Ru and Vesti FM, and a Reserve Colonel of the Russian Federation
- Iosif Gusakovsky - Soviet military leader during World War II who was twice awarded the title Hero of the Soviet Union during World War II for his command of the 44th Guards Tank Brigade
- Vasily Sokolovsky, Soviet general and Marshal of the Soviet Union who led Red Army forces on the Eastern Front during World War II.
- Ivan Yakubovsky, Marshal of the Soviet Union, twice made a Hero of the Soviet Union and serving as commander-in-chief of the Warsaw Pact from 1967 to 1976
- Yevgeny Ivanovsky, Soviet Army General who served in numerous high commands following the Second World War, including the command of the Moscow Military District from 1968 to 1972, command of the Group of Soviet Forces in Germany from 20 July 1972 to 25 November 1980
- Vasily Yushkevich, Soviet Army colonel general
- Yevgeni F. Ivanovski - Soviet military general who served in numerous high commands following the Second World War, including the command of the Moscow Military District from 1968 to 1972, command of the Group of Soviet Forces in Germany from 20 July 1972 to 25 November 1980.
- Pyotr Stefanovsky, Soviet test pilot
- Lev Artsimovich, a Soviet physicist, academician of the Soviet Academy of Sciences (1953)
- Viktor Yanukovych, the fourth President of Ukraine
- Irina Gerasimenok - sport shooter, specializing in the rifles event
- Vladimir Kazachyonok - Soviet football player
- Yevgeni Latyshonok - footballer
- Vladimir Leshonok - footballer
- Viktor Lopatyonok - footballer
- Aleksandr Perchenok - football forward
- Timofei Slivets - freestyle skier, specializing in aerials
- Assol Slivets - freestyle skier
- Aleksandra Bortich, Actress
- Denis Matsukevich - tennis player
- Nicolay Paskevich- painter working mostly in ink, acrylic, and pastel, exhibiting an interest in action, power, music, and western motifs
- Elena Zaiatz - female chess player who holds the FIDE titles of International Master (2005) and Woman Grandmaster (1988)
- Innokenty Smoktunovsky, a Soviet actor acclaimed as the "king of Soviet actors"
- Georgy Mondzolevski, Soviet former volleyball player
- Ruslan Salei, ice hockey player
- Sergei Drozd, ice hockey player
- Sergei Ignashevich, former professional footballer who played as central defender and is currently the manager of Russian Football National League club Torpedo Moscow.
- Andrey Makarevich, Soviet and Russian rock musician and the founder of Russia's oldest still active rock band Mashina Vremeni (Time Machine)
- Nikolai Shelyagovich - from April 2008 - Deputy Chairman of the Board of Directors of Alliance "Russian automation systems".
- Artyom Borovik - journalist and media magnate
- Igor Rudenya - statesman who is currently the 5th governor of Tver Oblast since 23 September 2016
- Yury Olesha - Russian and Soviet novelist
- Svyatoslav Sokol - member of the Communist Party of the Russian Federation
- Artyom Zemchyonok - professional ice hockey defenceman
- Nikita Tserenok - professional ice hockey defenceman
- Stepan Falkovsky - professional ice hockey defenceman
- Ilia Iljiushenok - chess grandmaster
- Svetlana Krivenok - para-athlete specializing in shot put
- Susana Kochesok - trampoline gymnast
- Yan Kuzenok - futsal player who has played for Dina Moscow since 2010
- Viktor Pinsky - deputy of the 6th, 7th, and 8th State Dumas
- Pavel Moysevich - ice hockey goaltender for SKA Saint Petersburg of the Kontinental Hockey League
- Yelena Stempkovskaya - Soviet radio operator in the 216th Rifle Regiment of the Red Army during World War II who was posthumously awarded the title Hero of the Soviet Union on 15 May 1946.
- Vladimir Strzhizhevsky - World War I flying ace
- Nikolai Svyatopolk-Mirsky, of the Białynia clan, was a Russian Imperial cavalry general and politician
  - Dmitry Ivanovich Svyatopolk-Mirsky (1825–1899), son of Tomasz — Russian Infantry General and politician, hero of the Caucasus and Russo-Turkish wars, member of the State Council of Imperial Russia; Short biography (in Russian)
- Pyotr Dmitrievich Sviatopolk-Mirsky (1857–1914), son of Dmitry Ivanovich — the governor of Penza and Vilna gubernias, Minister of the Interior of Russia. mini-profile (in Russian)
- Dmitry Pyotrovich Sviatopolk-Mirsky (1890–1939, pen name D. S. Mirsky), son of Pyotr Dmitrievich — Russian writer, historian and essayist
- Alexander Rybak - musician
- Artsyom Buloychyk - professional football coach and a former player, the manager of Russian FC Shinnik Yaroslavl
- Alyaksandr Kulchy - football manager and a former player
- Anna Kozyupa - football defender currently playing for Lokomotiv Moscow
- Georgy Shpak - retired Russian Airborne Forces colonel general
- Vladimir Antonik - actor and voice actor
- Vitaly Yurchik - water polo player who played on the bronze medal squad at the 2004 Summer Olympics
- Pavel Potapovich - track and field athlete who mainly competes in the 3000 metres steeplechase
- Sergei Gorlukovich - football manager and former player who played as a defender
- Anatoli Romanovich - footballer
- Bogdana Lukashevich - pair skater
- Liubov Yaskevich - female sport shooter
- Danil Burkenya - track and field athlete who competes mainly in triple jump
- Sergey Klevchenya - speed skater
- Yuri Sapega - professional volleyball player and coach
- Valery Shary - weightlifter and Olympic champion who competed for the Soviet Union
- Anastasia Protasenya - professional triathlete
- Larisa Korotkevich - retired female discus thrower
- Nadezhda Kovalevich - Soviet sprint canoer who competed in the late 1980s
- Ignaty Krachkovsky - Soviet Arabist, academician of the Russian Academy of Science (since 1921; since 1925 Academy of Science of the USSR)
- Vladimir Picheta - Soviet historian, Corresponding Member of the Academy of Sciences of the Soviet Union since 1939, Academician of the Academy of Sciences of the Soviet Union since 1946
- Sergei Tumansky - designer of Soviet aircraft engines and the chief designer in the Tumansky Design Bureau, OKB-300
- Vladimir Mitkevich - Soviet scientist and electrical engineer
- Anatoly Pokrovsky - vascular surgeon
- Mikhail Mashkovsky - Soviet and Russian pharmacologist, and Academician of the Russian Academy of Sciences, the author of the famous Soviet and later on Russian pharmacopoeia "Medical compounds", which had 15 successful editions (the last 15th edition was published after his death in 2005 in Russia)
- Yevgeny Kozlovsky - member of the Communist Party of the Soviet Union, he served as Minister of Geology OF USSR from 1975 to 1989
- Alexander Patashinski - Soviet physicist
- Alexander Bulatovich - Russian Imperial military officer, explorer of Africa, writer, hieromonk and the leader of the imiaslavie movement in Eastern Orthodox Christianity.
- Mikhail Koyalovich - historian, political journalist and publisher
- Anton Zhebrak - Soviet botanist, geneticist and professor
- Artyom Novichonok - astronomer
- Nikolai Shakura - astrophysicist, head of the relativistic astrophysics department at the Sternberg Astronomical Institute, Moscow University
- Vsevolod Savich - Soviet lichenologist
- Vladislav E. Niedzwiecki - lawyer and amateur naturalist
- Alexander Kovalevsky - embryologist
- Ivan Fojnickij - leading theorist of criminal law in the late Russian Empire
- Mikhail Mirkovich - Imperial Russian regimental commander and ethnographer
- Mitrofan Dovnar-Zapolsky - historian, ethnographer, and diplomat
- Semyon Sholkovich - historian, journalist, philologist and pedagogue
- Platon Zhukovich - Imperial Russian historian and theologian
- Yevgeny Korotkevich - Soviet scientist and polar explorer, Hero of Socialist Labour, and Doctor of Geographical Sciences
- Arkady Onishchik - Soviet mathematician, who worked on Lie groups and their geometrical applications
- Luke Voyno-Yasenetsky - surgeon, spiritual writer, a bishop of the Russian Orthodox Church, and archbishop of Simferopol and Crimea from May 1946 until his death
- Sergey Gritsevets - Soviet major and pilot who was twice awarded the title Hero of the Soviet Union
- Nikolai Vlasik - ranking Soviet state security (NKVD-NKGB-MGB) officer, best known as head of Joseph Stalin's personal security from 1931 to 1952
- Sergey Kadanchik - Red Army lieutenant colonel and posthumous Hero of the Soviet Union
- Ivan Timokhovich - military historian, Doctor of Historical Sciences, professor, Honored Scientist of Russia, Associate Member of the Russian Academy of Natural Sciences, Major General, Russian Air Force
- Adam Rimashevsky - admiral, served as commander of the Ushakov Baltic Higher Naval School from 1998 to 2003, the Higher Special Officer Classes of the Navy from 2003 to 2008, and the Kuznetsov Naval Academy from 2008 to 2012
- Valentin Drozd - Soviet Navy vice admiral killed in World War II
- Frants Perkhorovich - Soviet Army lieutenant general and a Hero of the Soviet Union
- Konstantin Gerchik - military officer who served in the Red Army and a program manager in the former Soviet space program
- Aleksandr Gorovets - deputy squadron commander of the 1st squadron of the 88th Guards Fighter Aviation Regiment in the Soviet Air Forces during the Second World War
- Stepan Krasovsky - Soviet Air Force marshal of the aviation
- Mikhail Kuchinsky - Soviet Air Force Lieutenant colonel and Hero of the Soviet Union
- Igor Rodobolsky - Officer, served in the Soviet-Afghan War towards the end from 1986 to 1989, and he also served in the First and Second Chechen Wars
- Artur Nepokoychitsky - Imperial Russian military leader
- Pyotr Vannovsky - Russian Minister of War (1881- 1898)
- Alexander Gertsyk - commander, Lieutenant General, Chief of the 1st Guards Infantry Division, participant in the Russo-Turkish War and World War I
- Alexander Ragoza - Russian general of the infantry during World War I
- Dmitry Kustanovich - artist
- Anatoli Nenartovich - artist
- Rostislav Vovkushevsky - artist
- Georgy Nissky - prominent Soviet painter and a founder of the severe style
- Ivan Zholtovsky - architect and educator
- Viktor Drobysh - composer and music producer, Honored Artist of Russia (2010)
- Eduard Khanok - Soviet musician and composer
- Natalia Podolskaya - singer who performed for Russia at the 2005 Eurovision Song Contest and was ranked No. 15
- Aleksandr Aksenyonok - Ambassador of Russia to Slovakia (11 November 1998 – 14 August 2002)
- Olga Dihovichnaya - actress
- Anel Sudakevich - actress
- Irina Brazgovka - actress
- Elena Solovey - actress
- Igor Shklyarevsky - poet
- Yelena Stempkovskaya - Soviet radio operator in the 216th Rifle Regiment of the Red Army during World War II who was posthumously awarded the title of Hero of the Soviet Union on 15 May 1946
- Anatoly Kontsevoy - Russian Airborne Forces officer who has served as a deputy chief of the General Staff of the Russian Armed Forces since 2025
