= KUST =

KUST may stand for:

In geography:

- The Middle Persian name for “regions,” or “sides" of Iran.

In university:

- Kohat University of Science and Technology in Kohat, Khyber Pakhtunkhwa, Pakistan
- Komar University of Science and Technology in Sulaymaniyah, Iraq
- Korea University of Science and Technology, in South Korea
- Kunming University of Science and Technology in Kunming, Yunnan Province, China

In people:

- For the Belarusian painter, see Dmitry Kustanovich.

In broadcasting:

- KUST (FM), a radio station (88.7 FM) licensed to serve Moab, Utah, United States

In biology

- Saussurea costus, also known as "kuth" or "costus", a species of thistle whose roots are a source of essential oils
