= List of Heroes of the Russian Federation (R) =

This is a list of people who have been awarded the title Hero of the Russian Federation.

It has been awarded more than 970 times, of which more than 440 were posthumously.

== List of Heroes of the Russian Federation ==
- Vasily Rabota (ru)
- Aleksandr Raevsky
- Dmitry Razumovsky (ru)
- Aleksey Rasskaza (ru)
- Vasily Rastyapin (ru)
- Mansur Rafikov (ru)
- Vladimir Rakhmanov (ru)
- Sergey Radchuk (ru)
- Mikhail Revenko (ru)
- Sergey Revin
- Viktor Ren (ru)
- Grigory Reutov (ru)
- Igor Rzhavitin (ru)
- Aleksey Rodin (ru)
- Yevgeny Rodionov (ru)
- Igor Rodobolsky (ru)
- Yevgeny Rodkin (ru)
- Andrey Rozhkov (ru)
- Roman Romanenko
- Roman Kutuzov (general)
- Aleksey Romanov (ru)
- Anatoly Romanov
- Viktor Romanov (ru)
- Viktor Romanov (ru)
- Sergey Romashin (ru)
- Sergey Ropotan (ru)
- Nikolai Rostovsky (ru)
- Valery Rostovshchikov (ru)
- Ivan Rubtsov (ru)
- Sergey Rudskoy (ru)
- Aleksandr Rudykh (ru)
- Aleksey Rumyantsev (ru)
- Aleksey Rusanov (ru)
- Leonid Russkikh (ru)
- Vladimir Rushailo
- Aleksey Rybak (ru)
- Sergey Rybnikov (ru)
- Aleksandr Ryzhikov (ru)
- Sergey Ryzhikov
- Pyotr Ryzhov (ru)
- Anatoly Rymar (ru)
- Yevgeny Ryndin (ru)
- Dmitry Rychkov (ru)
- Sergey Ryazansky
- Aleksandr Ryazantsev (ru)
