= Ethnographic Atlas of the Western Russian Governorates and Neighboring Regions =

Russian ethnographic and statistical atlas published in 1863

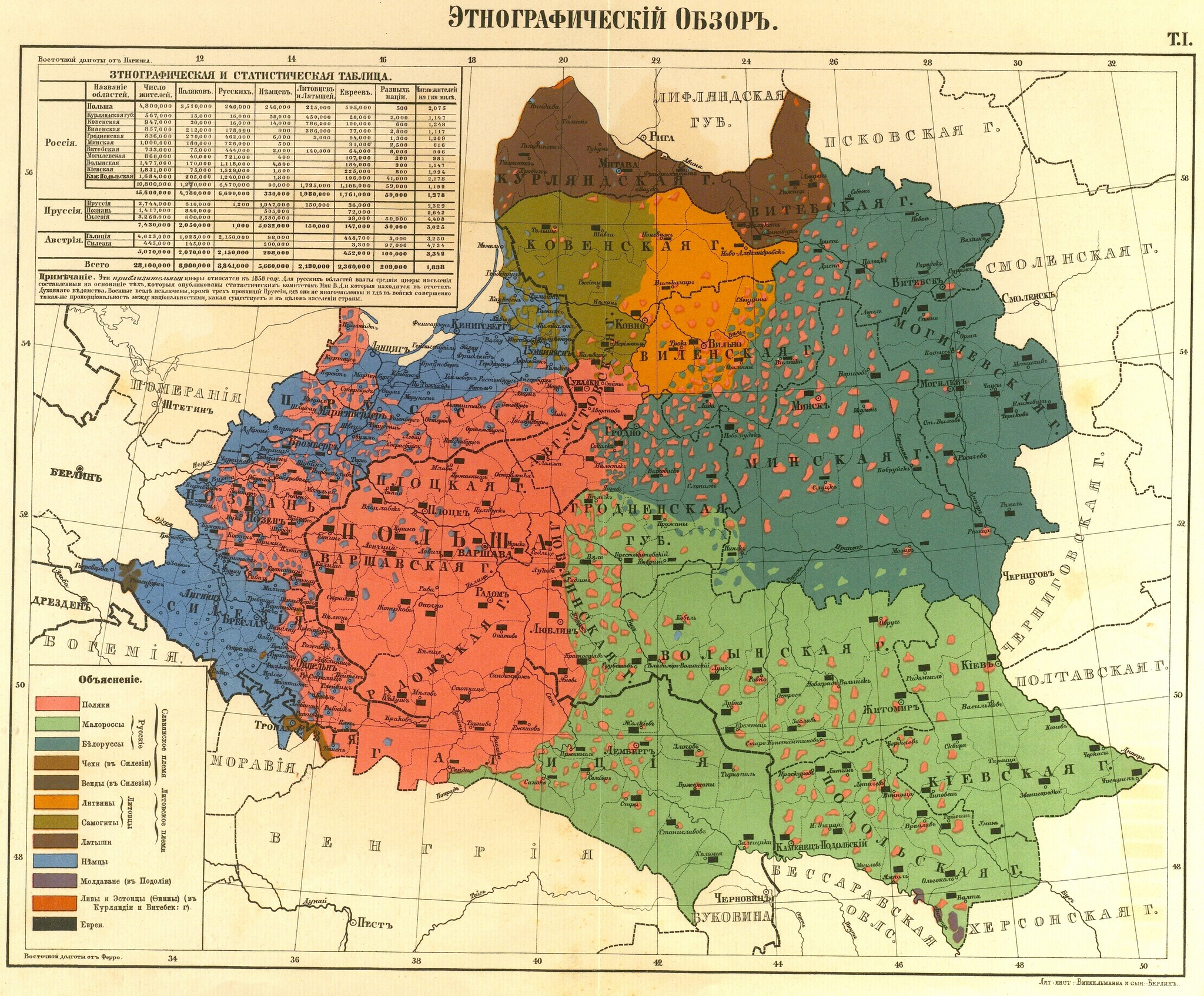
- Ethnographic map of the western territories of the Russian Empire from Erckert's atlas
- Author: Roderich von Erckert
- Language: Russian, French
- Subject: Ethnography, demographic statistics, cartography
- Publication date: 1863
- Publication place: Russian Empire

The Ethnographic Atlas of the Western Russian Governorates and Neighboring Regions (Russian: Этнографический атлас западнорусских губерний и соседних областей; French: Atlas ethnographique des provinces habitées en totalité ou en partie par des Polonais) is a large-scale cartographic and statistical work published in Saint Petersburg in 1863 by Russian military statistician and ethnographer, General Staff Colonel Roderich von Erckert. It is one of the most important documents of official Russian ethnostatistics from the period of the January Uprising (1863–1864), created with the aim of justifying the "Russian" character of the Northwestern Krai and Southwestern Krai of the Russian Empire.

In 1864, a companion book titled A Look at the History and Ethnography of the Western Governorates of Russia was published as a textual supplement and explanation of the atlas.

== Historical context and purpose ==
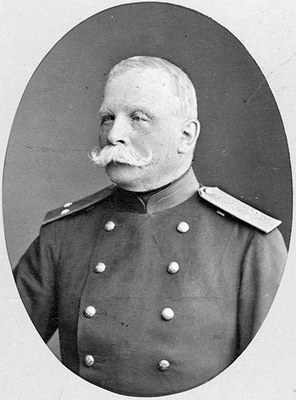
Roderich von Erckert around 1885.

The publication of the atlas coincided with the January Uprising (1863–1864), a period when the question of the national identity of the population in former Poland–Lithuania sharply escalated in the Russian Empire. The Russian government and bureaucratic institutions had an urgent need for statistical data that would prove to both European and domestic audiences that the majority of the region's population was "Russian" rather than Polish.

Roderich von Erckert, a German by origin and an employee of the Imperial Russian Geographical Society, took on the task of classifying the local population. He relied on data from previous studies, including the parish lists of Peter von Köppen. The atlas was published in two versions: in Russian and in French. The French version was specifically intended for a European audience to refute Polish political claims to these territories.

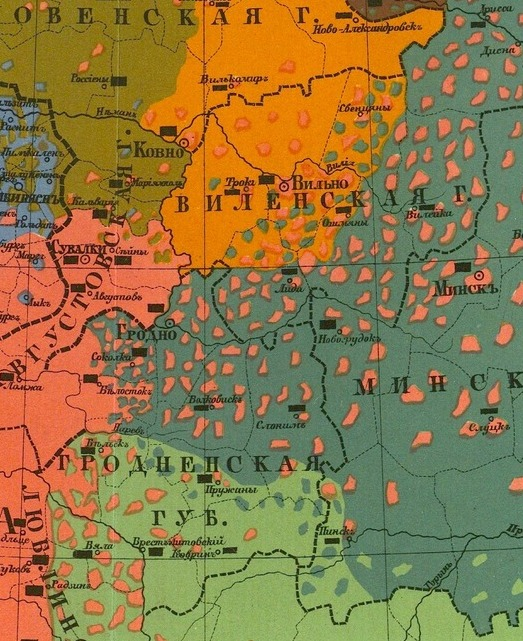
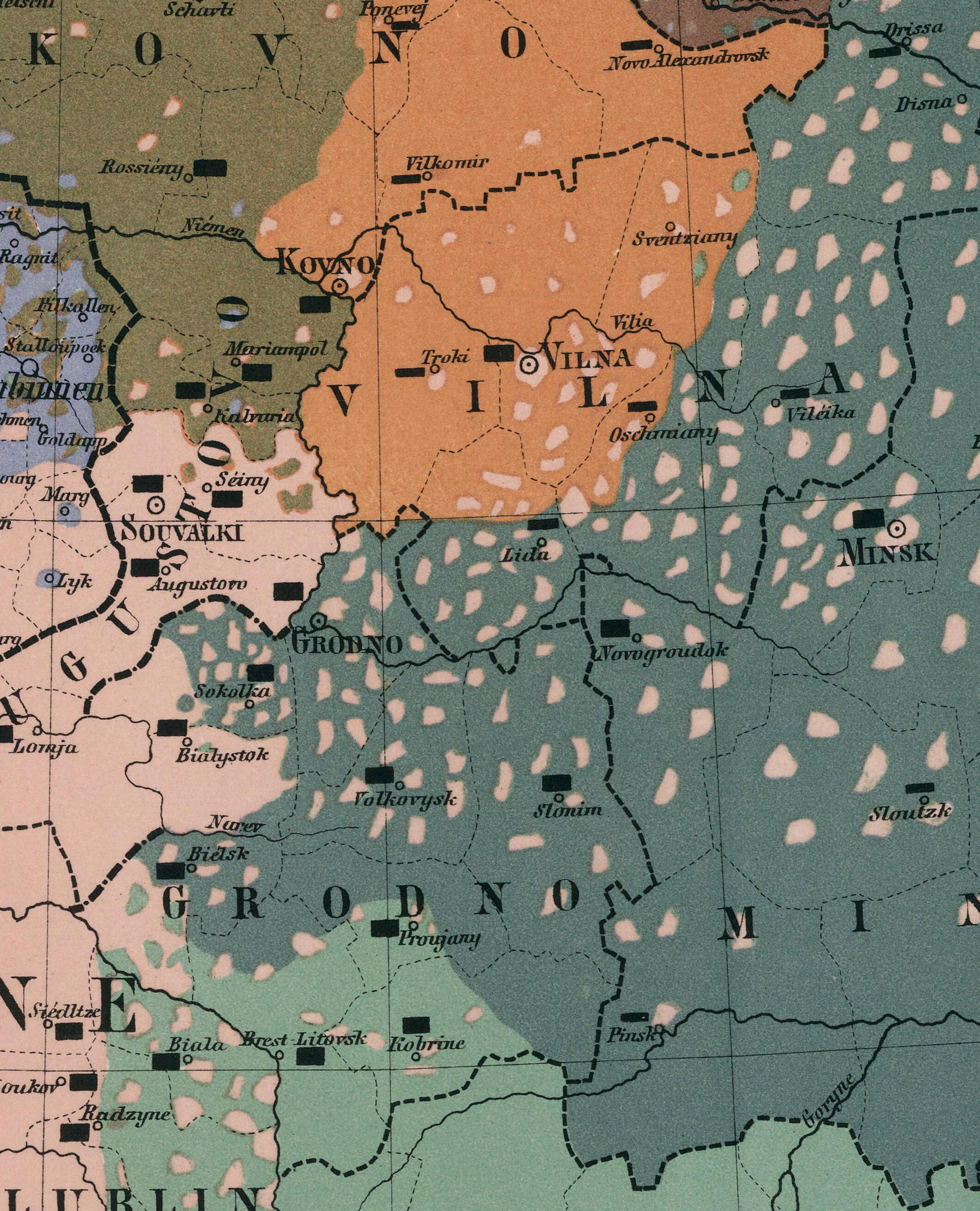
Fragments of the Russian-language (left) and French-language (right) versions of the ethnographic map from the "Ethnographic Atlas of the West Russian Provinces and Neighboring Regions" (1863). The French version differs not only in translation but also in the graphical distortion of the original: Belarusian enclaves are not marked on it (in the Vilnius Region and Podlachia, they were removed entirely; in Western Polesia, the border of the "Little Russians" was shifted so that the enclaves became part of a continuous Belarusian area), although the atlas's tabular data on the number of the Belarusian population in the respective regions remained unchanged.

== Methodology ==
The primary criterion for determining ethnic identity of Slavs in Erckert's atlas was religious affiliation. The author considered this approach to be "the most correct" and proposed that all Eastern Slavic populations practicing Orthodoxy should be counted as Russians, while all Catholics should be counted as Poles.

Erckert categorically denied the existence of a "Catholic Belarusian". In his study, he argued:

The expression 'Catholic Belarusian' is found, it is true, quite often in scientific articles, but in reality it does not and cannot exist <...>. The commoner calls his language prostaya mova [simple speech], and himself Russian, often even Lithuanian (according to political traditions), or simply a peasant... <...> The Polish nobility, and especially the Catholic clergy, often use the expression 'Lithuanians' about those Catholics whose native language remains Russian. In this case they make a political mistake.

Thus, Erckert combined Great Russians, Belarusians, and Ukrainians ("Little Russians") into a single dominant group of "Russians", contrasting them with Poles and actual Lithuanians, whom he further divided into Lithuanian and Samogitians.

== Ethnographic division of Belarusians ==
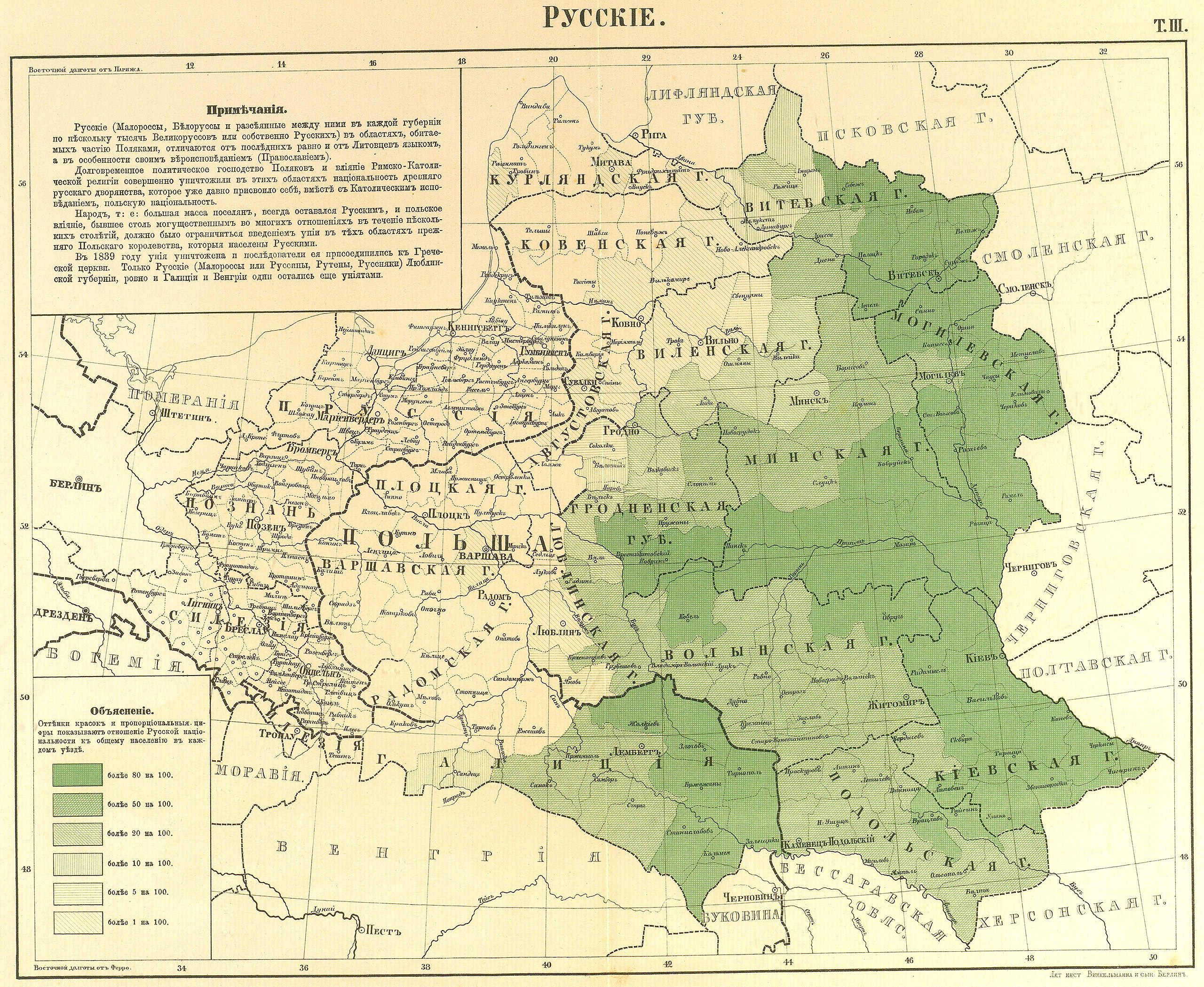
Map of the settlement of Russians in the western part of the Russian Empire from Erckert's atlas. The map tendentiously merged Great Russians, Belarusians, and Little Russians into a single "Slavic tribe".

Despite merging them into a single Slavic tribe, Erckert attempted to identify distinct regional groups of Belarusians within it. In his works, he divided the ethnic territory of Belarusians into three parts and, correspondingly, three groups.

He categorized the first group as "True Belarusians", who inhabited the Vitebsk, Mogilev, the eastern and western parts of Minsk and Smolensk governorates, respectively.

The second group consisted of the "Black Russians", living in the western part of the Minsk Governorate and the northern part of the Grodno Governorate. However, Erckert noted that the population itself did not use this name, nor did they call themselves Belarusians, and that the local Polish szlachta (nobility) referred to them as Lithuanians.

The third group—the Podlasians—inhabited the western part of the Grodno Governorate and were considered by the researcher to be the most Polonized segment of the Belarusians.

Relying on linguistic features, Erckert classified the population of the southern Grodno and Minsk governorates (Western Polesia) as "Ruthenians" (Rusins), perceiving them as part of the Little Russians (Ukrainians).

== Criticism ==
=== Contemporary ===
Erckert's tendentious methodology and the artificial isolation of certain ethnic groups provoked harsh criticism even from contemporary Russian researchers. Pavel Bobrovsky, a General Staff officer and native of the Grodno region, pointed out the fallacy of equating all Catholics with Poles, arguing that the primary marker of nationality is one's native language. Researcher Semyon Sholkovich drew attention to the artificiality of the term "Black Russians", noting that such a tribe did not exist in reality and that the name was found exclusively in Polish historical literature.

=== Modern Belarusian ===
Some claim that the atlas is characterized by obvious tendentiousness in determining the ethnic affiliation of Belarusians. Guided by ideological motives, Erckert artificially classified the local population exclusively based on religious confession, categorizing all Orthodox believers as "Russians" and all Catholic Belarusians as Poles, while categorically denying the very existence of a "Catholic Belarusian".

Despite this criticism, Erckert's atlas, alongside the works of Aleksandr Rittikh, firmly established the tradition of defining ethnicity through religious confession in Russian imperial statistics. This approach repeatedly led to the distortion of the actual ethno-demographic picture in Belarus and neighboring countries.

== Bibliography ==
- Унуковіч, Ю. (2020). Этнічная ідэнтыфікацыя і катэгарызацыя беларусаў і літоўцаў у ХІХ стагоддзі [Ethnic identification and categorization of Belarusians and Lithuanians in the 19th century]. Białorutenistyka Białostocka (in Belarusian) (12): 377–398.
- Комзолова, А. А. (2020). Национальная идентичность в статистических исследованиях Северо-Западного края Российской империи (1860-е годы) [National identity in statistical studies of the North-Western Krai of the Russian Empire (1860s)]. Большая Евразия: развитие, безопасность, сотрудничество (in Russian) (3). Москва: 496–501.
- Терешкович, П. В. (2004). Этническая история Беларуси XIX — начала XX в.: В контексте Центрально-Восточной Европы [Ethnic history of Belarus in the 19th - early 20th centuries: In the context of Central-Eastern Europe] (PDF) (in Russian). Минск: БГУ. p. 223.
- Эркерт, Р. Ф. (1864). Взгляд на историю и этнографию западных губерний России [A look at the history and ethnography of the western governorates of Russia] (in Russian). Санкт-Петербург.
