= Baranovich =

Baranovich may refer to:

- Baranavichy, a city in modern-day Belarus
- Yeshiva Ohel Torah-Baranovich in Baranavichy
- Yefim Baranovich (1884-1948), Russian and Soviet military officer
- Lazar Baranovich (1620-1693), Ukrainian Orthodox archbishop

== See also ==
- Michele Baranowicz
