= Stepan Kretov =

Soviet pilot (1919–1975)

Stepan Ivanovich Kretov
- Born: 25 December 1919; Malaya Nichka, Yeniseysk Governorate, Russian SFSR
- Died: 19 January 1975 (aged 55); Moscow, Soviet Union
- Military career
- Allegiance: Soviet Union
- Branch: Soviet Air Forces 1939 – 1958; Strategic Rocket Forces
- Service years: 1939 – 1974
- Rank: Colonel
- Unit: 24th Guards Bomber Aviation Regiment
- Conflicts: World War II
- Awards: Hero of the Soviet Union (twice)

Stepan Ivanovich Kretov (Russian: Степан Иванович Кретов; 25 December 1919 – 19 January 1975) was a Soviet World War II bomber pilot who was twice awarded the title Hero of the Soviet Union.

== Early life ==
Kretov was born on 25 December 1919 to a Russian peasant family in Malaya Nichka. After moving to the city of Minusinsk in 1933 he went on to graduate from his seventh grade of school in 1936, after which he returned to his hometown to work on a collective farm until 1937. After completing a course at the Kansk Agricultural College in 1938 he worked as a clerk at the Kansk district NKVD office, but he left the position in 1939 for the Red Army after graduating from the local aeroclub. Initially he attended the Chita Military Aviation School of Pilots until September 1939, then he attended the Balashov Military Aviation School of Pilots which he graduated from in August 1940 before being posted to the 228th Long Range Bomber Aviation Regiment. However, he soon transferred to the 21st Long Range Bomber Aviation Regiment in January 1941.

== World War II ==
Despite the threat of being grounded from flying due to anosmia, he was eventually cleared to fly, allowing him to make his first combat sortie during the war in June 1941 on a DB-ZA heavy bomber. In September, he managed to bring his crippled plane back to his home airfield after an aerial battle that took out one engine and punctured much of the fuselage. On 1 December his plane was pursued by multiple Messerschmitt fighters after bombing a target in Taganrog and eventually shot down, forcing him to bail out of the burning plane over the sea. Despite severe burns to his hands, he was able to hang on to a floating log with other survivors from his crew, and they eventually managed to swim to the safety of shore. He returned to flying only ten days after the incident.

In September 1943 his regiment received the Guards designation, resulting in it being renamed as the 24th Guards Long Range Aviation Regiment, and that same month Kretov was nominated for his first gold star for totaling 284 sorties, all but 20 at night. By then he had reached the position of squadron commander, but the month before the title was awarded on 13 March 1944 he participated in a long-distance bombing campaign targeting Helsinki intended to force Finland to drop out of the war. Not long after receiving the award, he was demoted from squadron commander to ordinary pilot due to disciplinary violations and transferred to the 24th Guards Long-Range Aviation Regiment. By the end of the war, he totaled 400 sorties on the BD-Za and Il-4, all but 31 at night, targeting enemy forces in Moldova, Ukraine, Rostov, Crimea, Leningrad, Belarus, Poland, Budapest, and Koenigsberg. On 21 May 1945 he was nominated for a second gold star, but he did not receive it until February 1948.

== Postwar ==
Despite his demotion in May 1944, Kretov was made squadron commander in the 240th Guards Bomber Aviation Regiment, previously designated as the 24th Guards Long-Range Aviation Regiment in September 1945. One year later he was made deputy squadron commander in the 108th Bomber Aviation Regiment, where he became a squadron commander before eventually leaving for the Higher Officers Flight and Tactical School of Long-Range Aviation in 1950. Upon graduation later that year, he became the head of the flight department of the 50th Air Army of Long-Range Aviation. In April 1953 he moved on to the 11th Guards Heavy Bomber Aviation Regiment as the head of the combat training department, where he remained until March 1959. From then until September 1959 he was posted as commander of the 335th Missile Regiment, after which he commanded the 151st Missile Regiment until July 1961, both part of the Strategic Missile Forces. For the rest of his career he worked as an instructor at military academies, initially at the Rostov Higher Command and Engineering School and then at the F.E. Dzerzhinsky Military Engineering Academy from 1972 until his retirement in 1974. He died in Moscow on 19 January 1975 and was buried in the Vvedenskoye Cemetery.

== Awards and honors ==
- Twice Hero of the Soviet Union (13 March 1944 and 23 February 1948)
- Two Order of Lenin (31 December 1942 and 13 March 1944)
- Two Order of the Red Banner (23 December 1941 and 14 November 1942)
- Order of the Red Star (30 April 1954)
- campaign and jubilee medals
