= Zarya (magazine) =

- Editor: Vasily Kashpirev
- Frequency: Monthly
- First issue: 1869
- Final issue: 1872
- Based in: Saint Petersburg, Russian Empire
- Language: Russian

Zarya (Russian: Заря, Dawn) was a monthly literary and political Russian magazine published in Saint Petersburg in 1869-1872.

A Slavophile-oriented journal, Zarya supported the liberal reforms in Russia while promoting the idea of strong Tsarist power. Nikolai Danilevsky's Russia and Europe, published there in 1869 (Nos. 1-6, 8-10) would later become the basis for Alexander III's government's official political doctrine. Among other notable works that were published by Zarya were "The Prisoner of the Caucasus" by Leo Tolstoy (1872, No. 2), The Eternal Husband by Fyodor Dostoyevsky, as well as assorted works by Fyodor Tyutchev, Afanasy Fet, Apollon Maykov, Yakov Polonsky, Alexey Pisemsky, Konstantin Leontyev, Dmitry Averkiyev, Vsevolod Krestovsky, Viktor Klyushnikov, Daniil Mordovtsev, Vasily Avseenko, Semyon Sholkovich. A pivotal figure in Zarya was the critic and journalist Nikolai Strakhov. His three essays on Tolstoy's War and Peace (1869, Nos. 1 and 2; 1870, No.1) provided the first detailed analysis on this novel in Russia.

The magazine's editor-in-chief Vasily Kashpiryov was also its publisher. After three years of struggling to attract the wider readership, he found himself on the verge of bankruptcy and stopped the publication in February 1872.
