= Vvedenskoye Cemetery =

Cemetery in Lefortovo, Russia

- Введенское кладбище
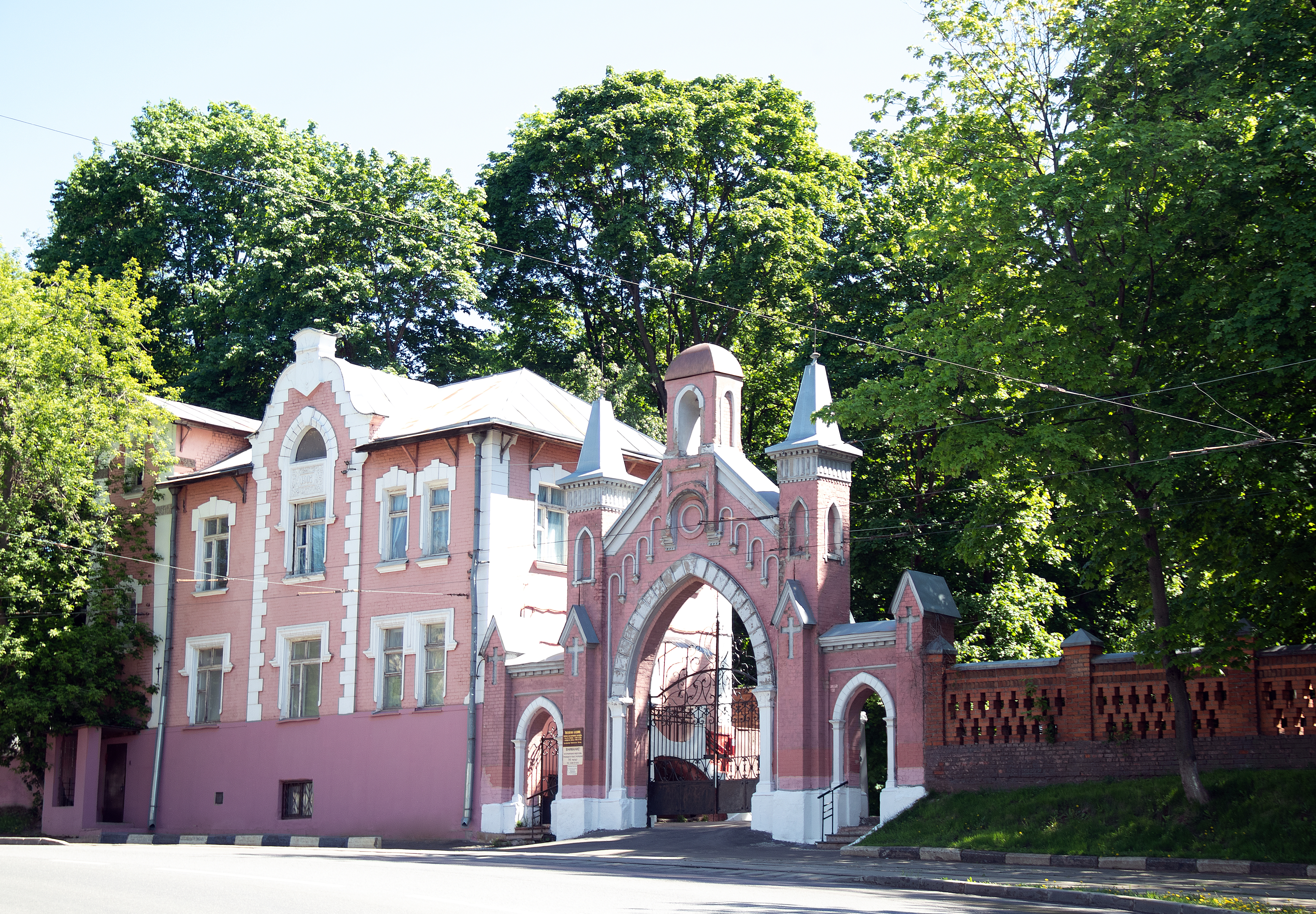
- Lutheran funeral home at the west entrance to the cemetery.
- Interactive map of Vvedenskoye Cemetery

Details
- Established: 1770s
- Location: Lefortovo District, Moscow
- Country: Russia
- Coordinates: 55°46′8″N 37°42′25″E
- Type: Public/Christian
- Size: 20 hectares (49 acres)

Vvedenskoye Cemetery (Russian: Введенское кладбище, IPA: [vʲːɪˈdʲenskəjə]) is a historic cemetery in Lefortovo District of Moscow in Russia.

Until 1918 it was mainly a burial ground for the Catholic and Protestant communities of the city, principally ethnic Germans, and thus it was also called the German Cemetery (Russian: Немецкое кладбище). After 1918 the cemetery was secularized and accepted the dead of all confessions, including the Orthodox clergy. Throughout its history it has also been extensively used as a military cemetery. It is located on a 20 hectare lot between Gospitalny Val Street and Nalichnaya Street at 55°46′8″N 37°42′25″E.

== Origins ==
Between late 1771 and 1772, Catherine the Great, Empress of the Russian Empire, issued an edict which decreed that, from that point on, any person who died (regardless of their social standing or class origins), no longer had the right to be buried within church crypts or adjacent churchyards. New cemeteries had to be built across the entire Russian empire and from then on they all had to be located outside city limits.

One of the main motivations behind these measures was overcrowding in church crypts and graveyards. However, the true deciding factor which led to the new laws being enforced on such a mass scale across the entire Russian empire was to avoid further outbreaks of highly contagious diseases, especially the black plague which had led to the Plague Riot in Moscow in 1771.

When the Vvedenskoye cemetery was established in the early 1770s, an older, 16th-century German cemetery was incorporated into it. This older cemetery was located near German Quarter (on the opposite bank of Yauza River), which had traditionally served the Lutheran community and other Western Christian denominations. In addition to German community, the cemetery tended to substantial English, Polish and Italian populations.

Unusual for Russian cemeteries, some graves, notably of Polish gentry, were set up as standalone crypts with walk-in chapels; these are now in a dilapidated state. Most graves, however, are plain headstones or crosses; traditional Russian sarcophagus-styled tombs of this period are rare and usually belong to Orthodox dead, originally buried elsewhere and relocated to Vvedenskoe later.

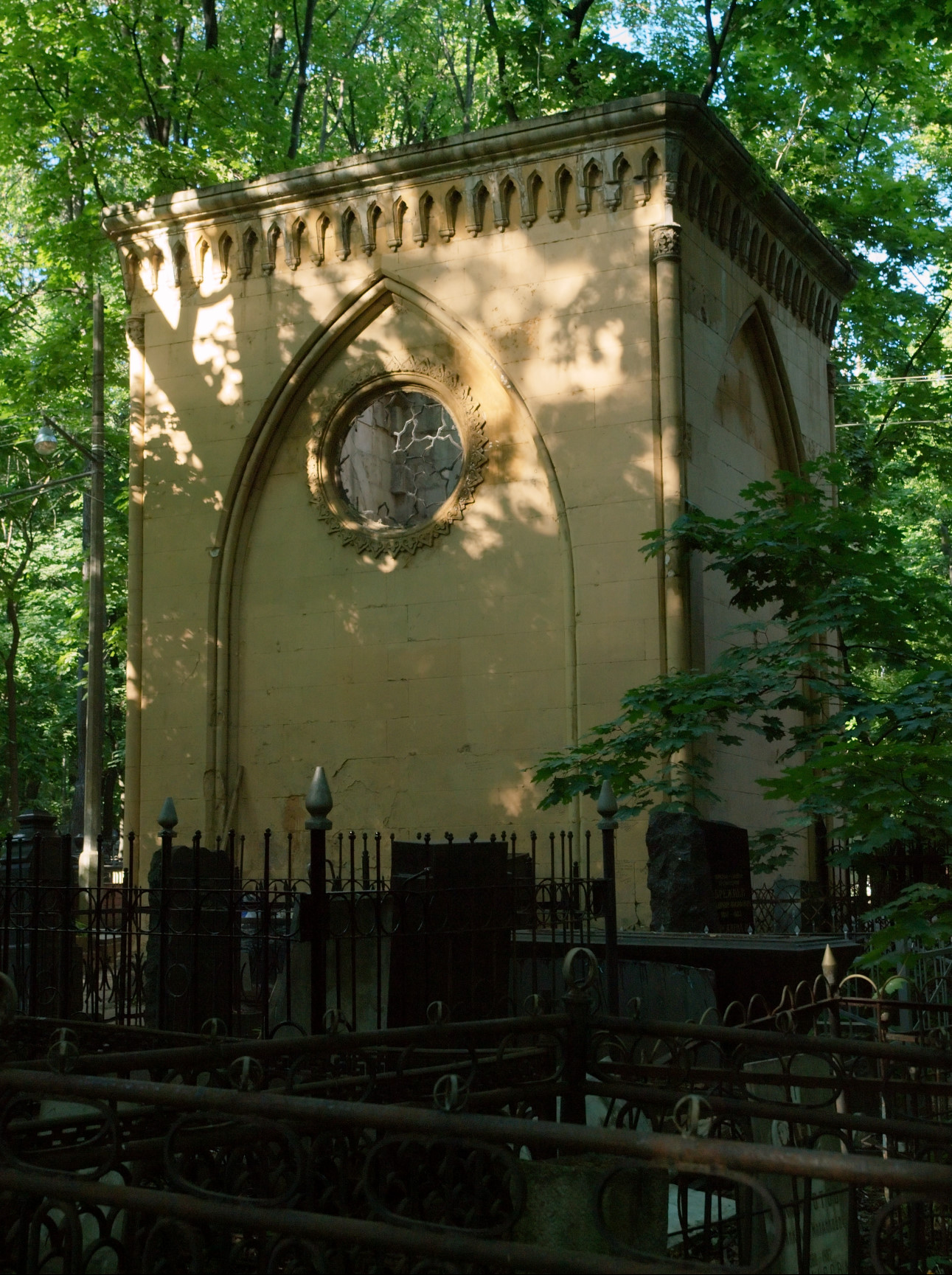

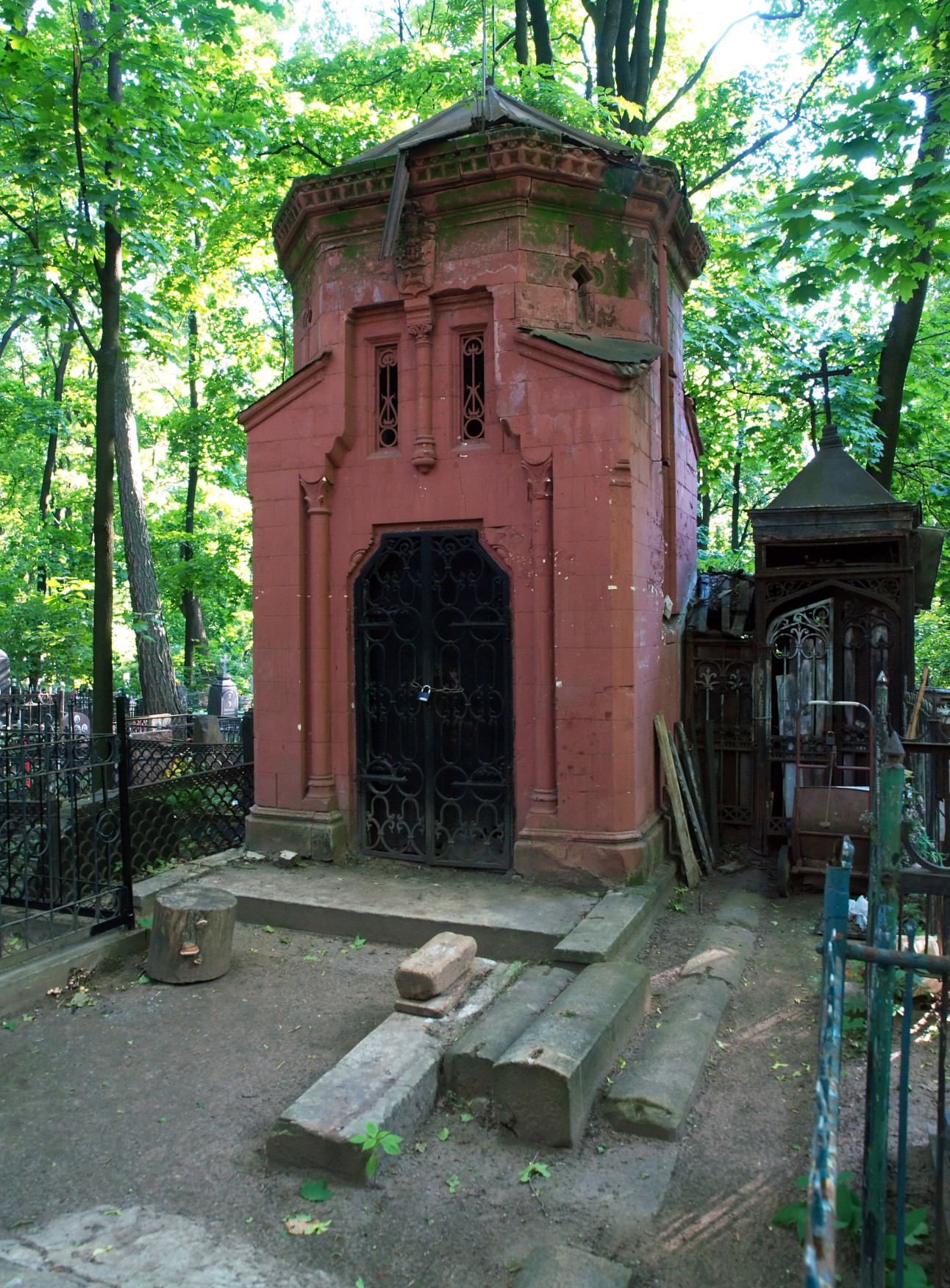

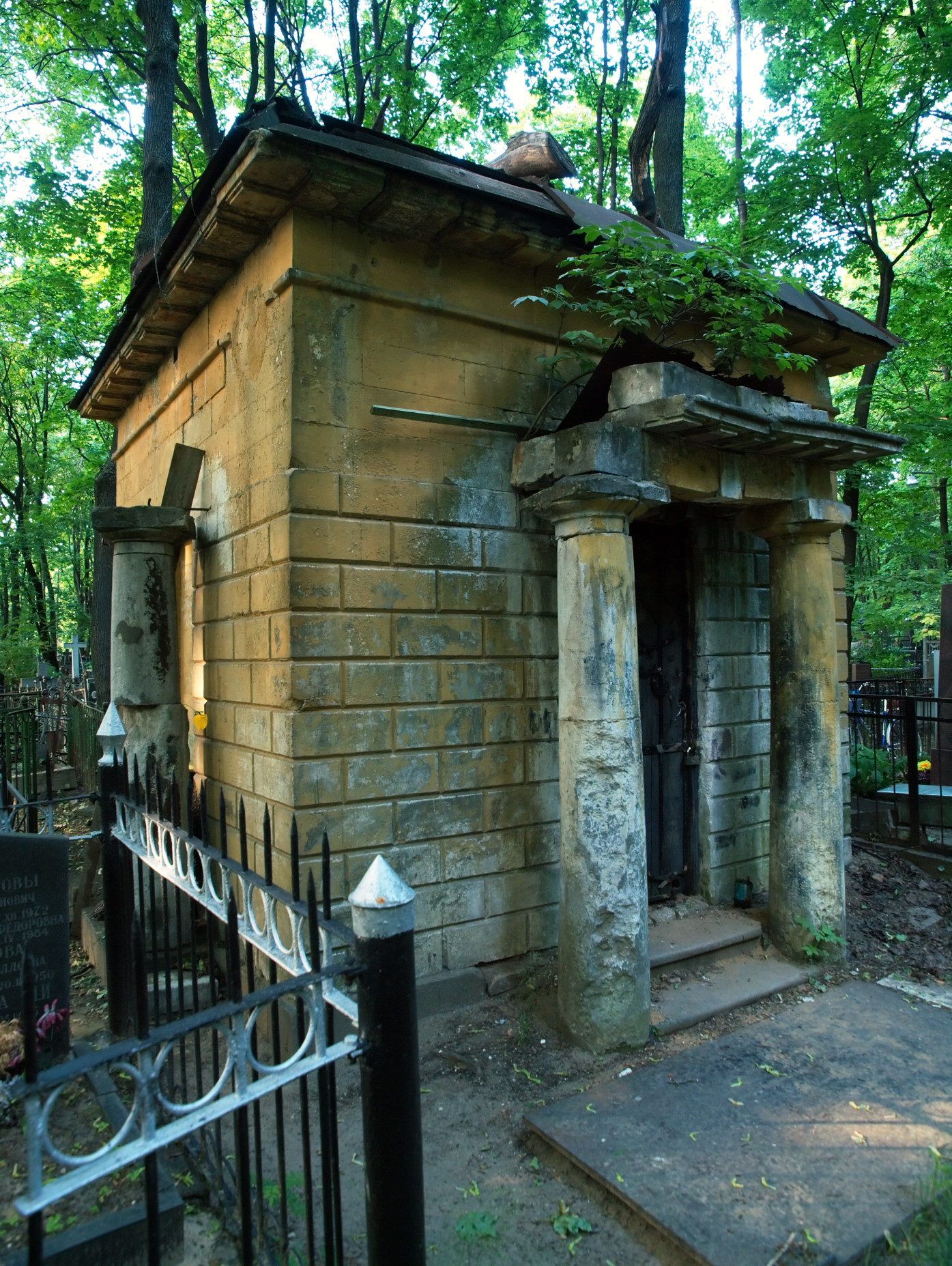

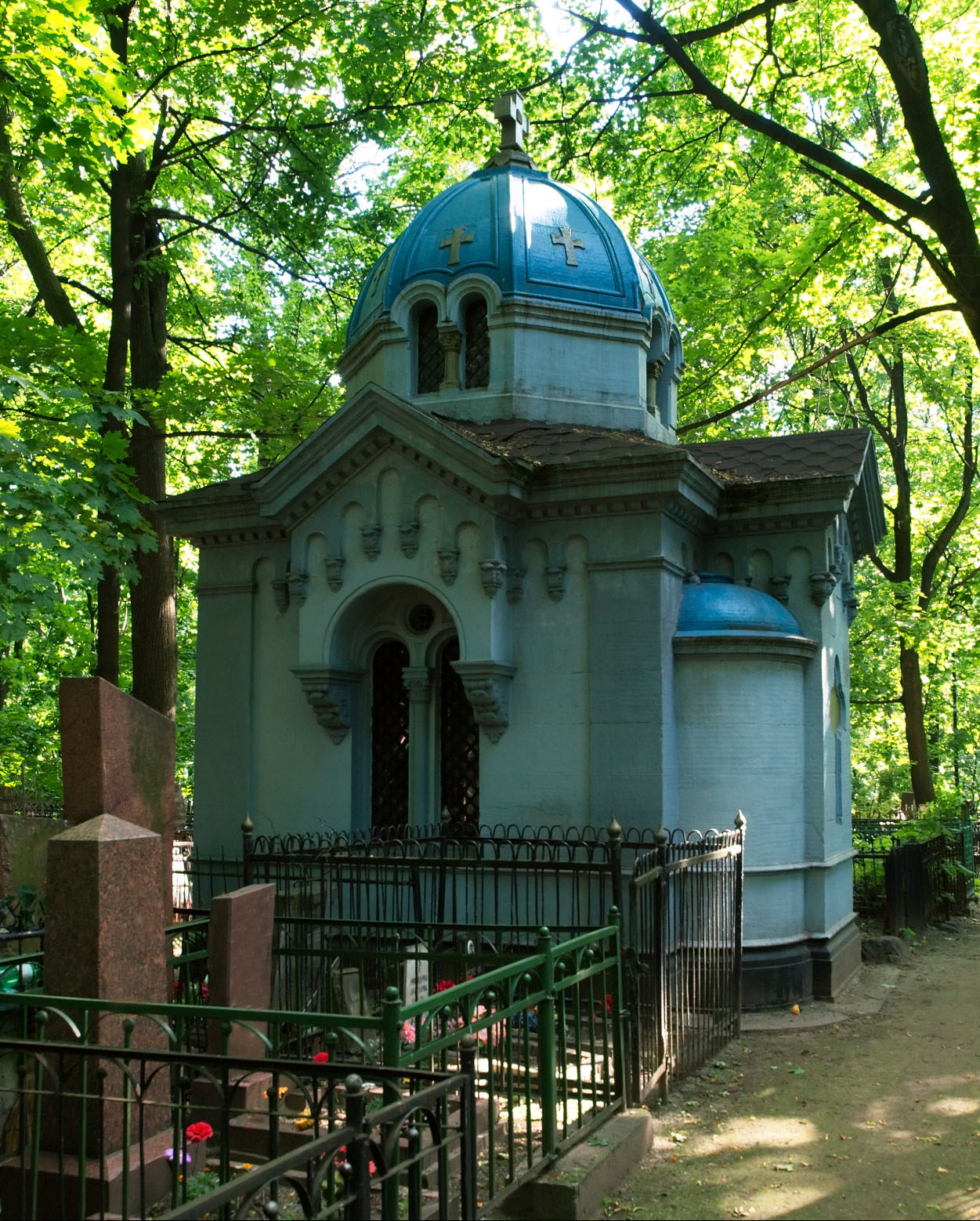

== 19th century ==
Due to the proximity of Lefortovo, Preobrazhenskoe and Semyonovskoe military facilities, Vvedenskoe also became a common site for burying deceased military – Russian servicemen as well as foreign prisoners of war. In 1889 the French government erected a memorial obelisk at the mass grave of soldiers of Grande Armée soldiers who died during the French invasion of Russia in 1812–1814. In 1914–1918 the cemetery also tended to the German and Austrian prisoners of First World War.

In the 19th century, the remains of Peter the Great generals Franz Lefort and Patrick Gordon, both who died in 1699, were exhumed and transferred to Vvedenskoye. Also buried at Vvedenskoye is the general-major Karl Staal, who was commander of Astrakhan cuirassier regiment in the 1813–1814 War of the Sixth Coalition against Napoleon. One of the most unusual tombs, of railroad engineer and educator Christian Meyen, is assembled of rail car wheels and steam engine parts and crowned with a 5-meter wrought iron cross.

=== Notable people buried before the revolution of 1917 ===
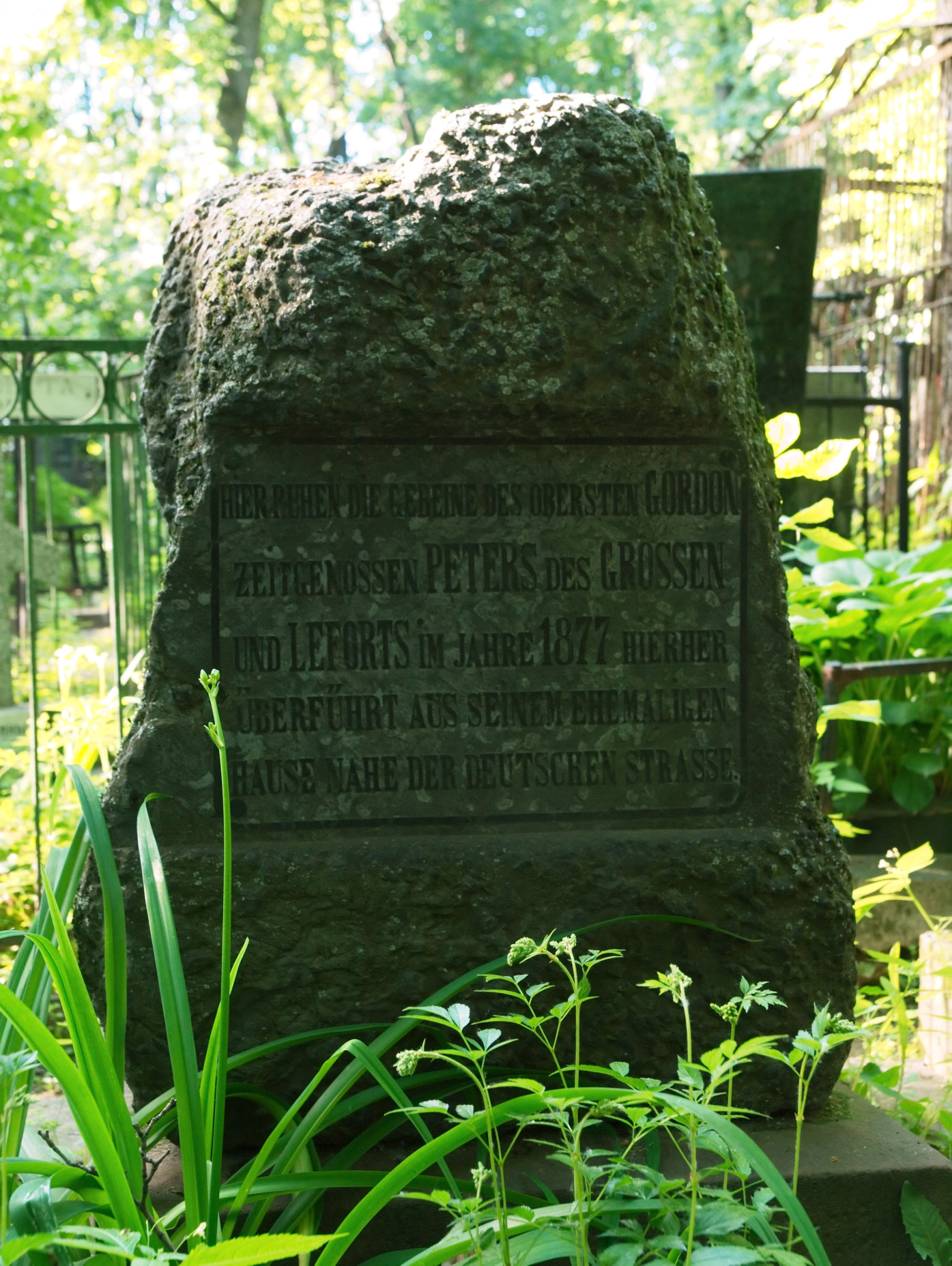
Patrick Gordon

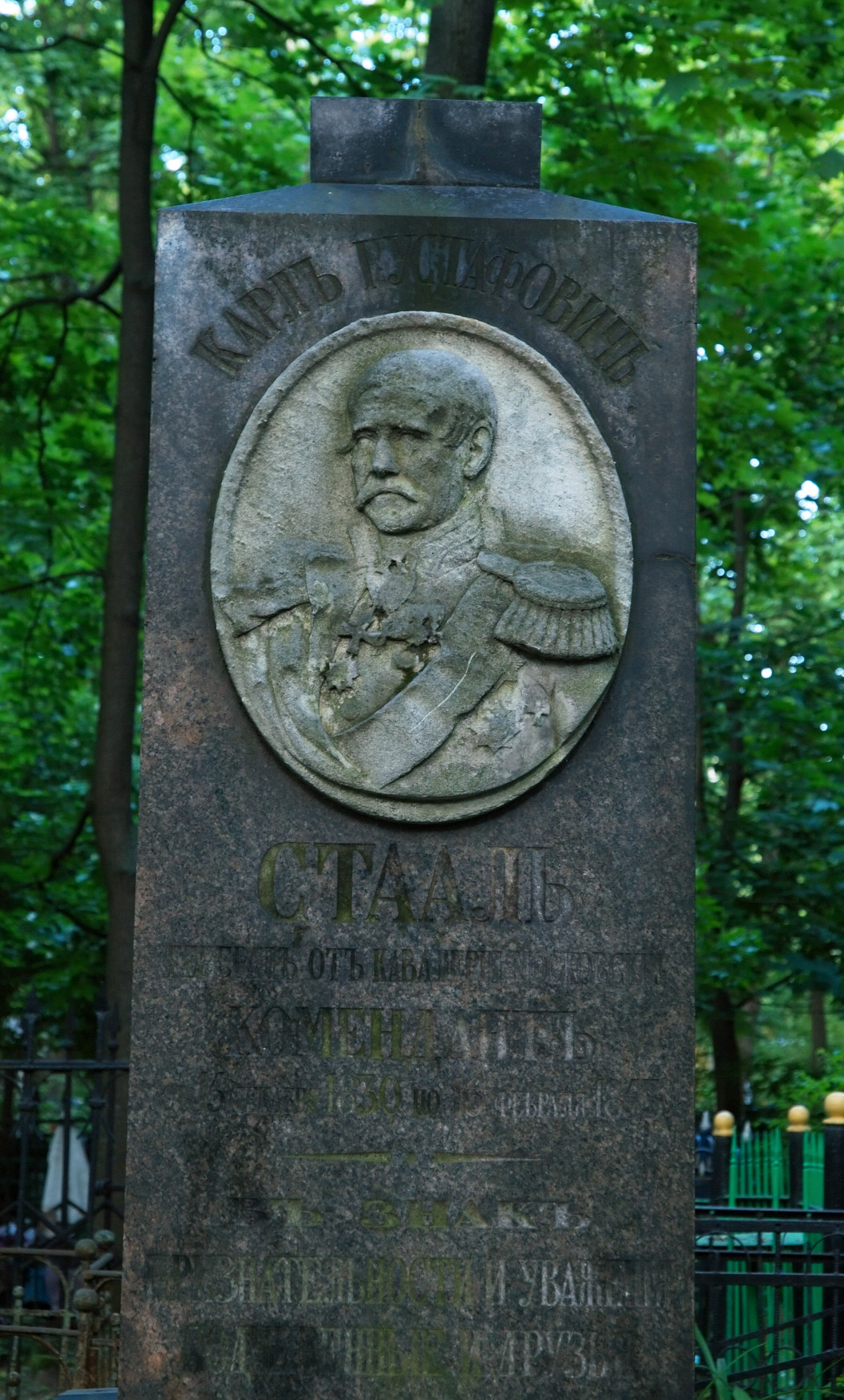
Karl Staal

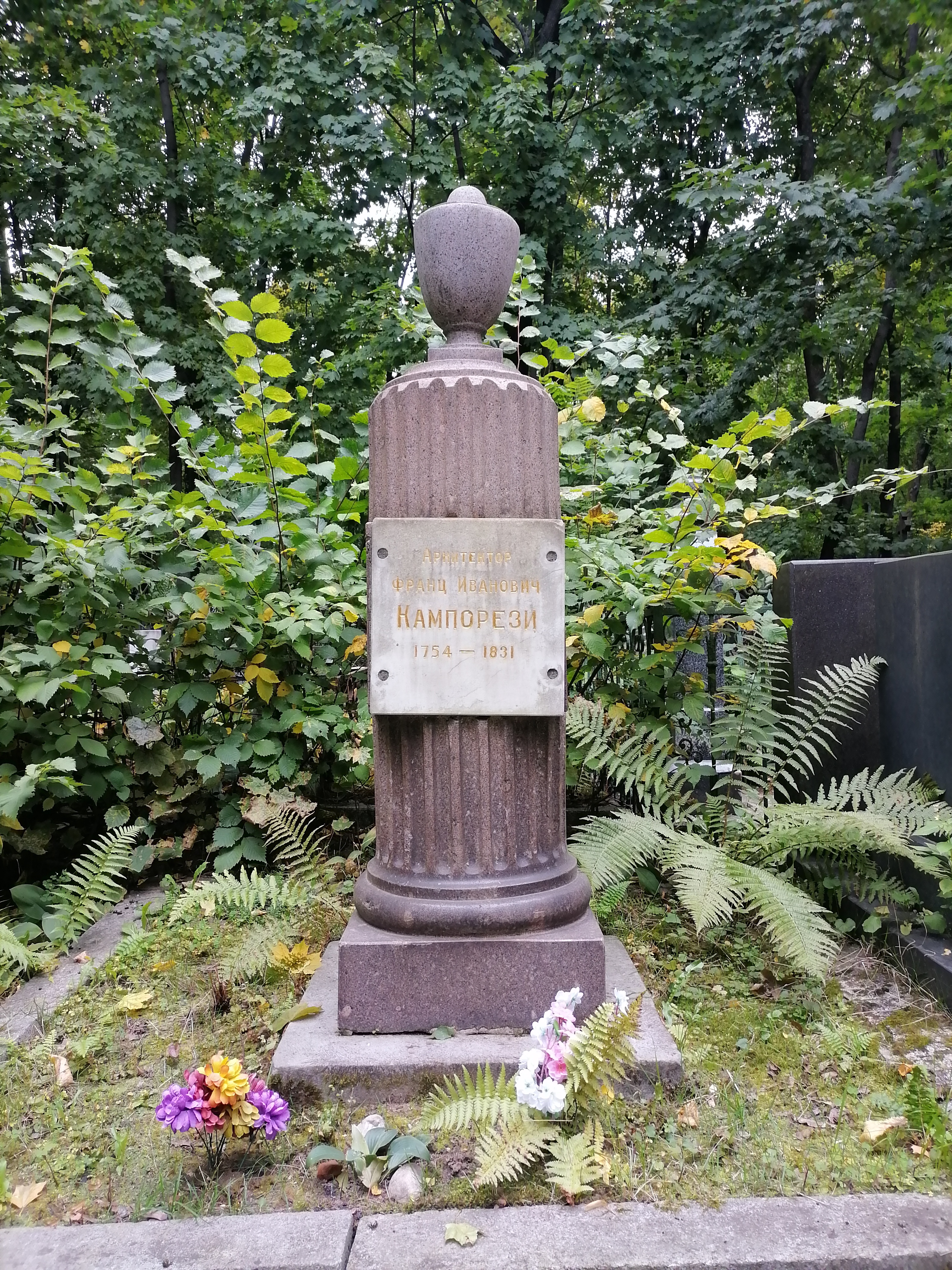
Francesco Camporesi

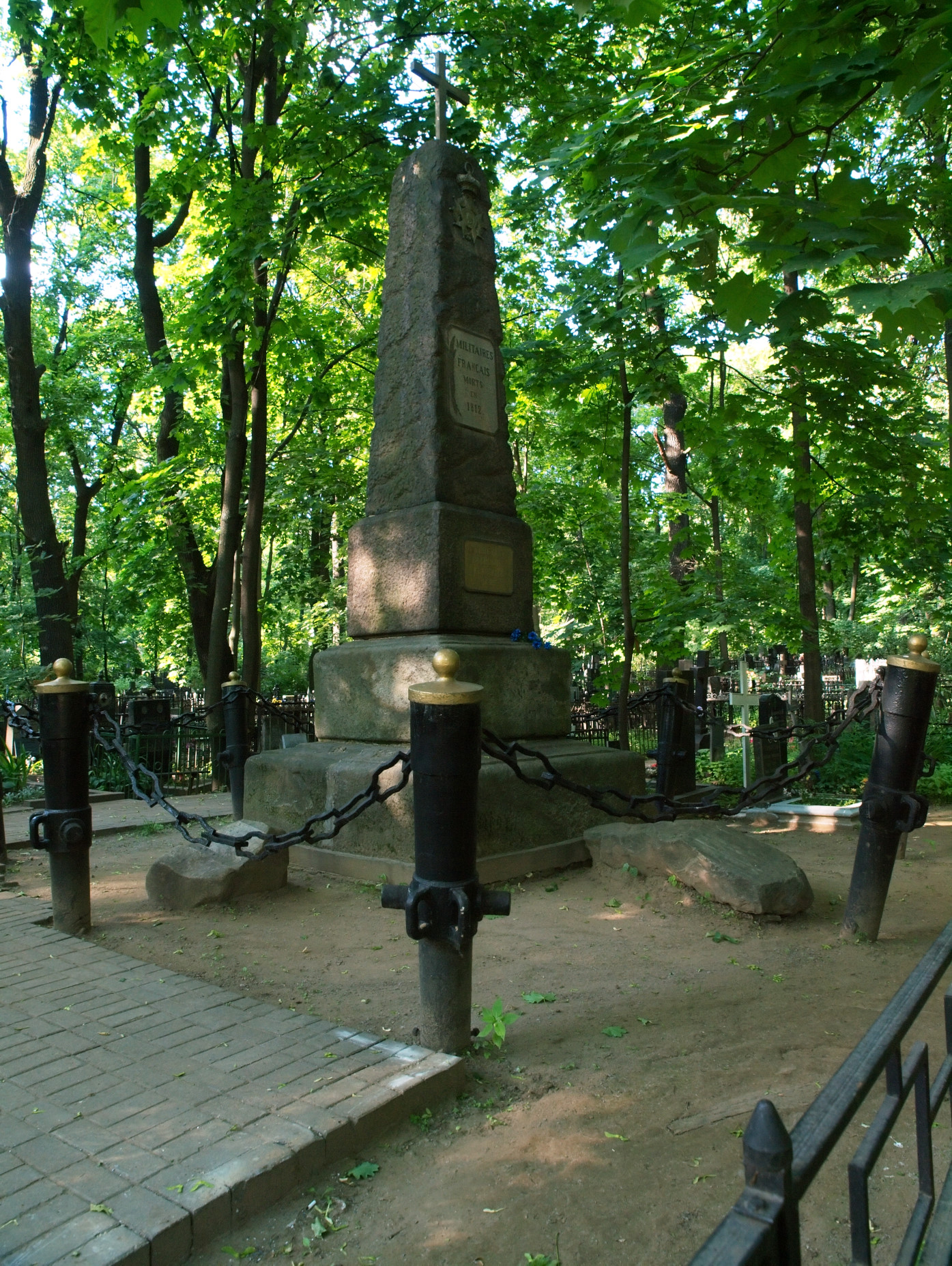
French of 1812
- Santino Campioni (1774–1847), sculptor
- August Davidov (1823–1885), mathematician
- Semyon Eybushitz (1851–1898), architect
- John Field (1782–1837), composer
- Friedrich (Fyodor) Haass (1780–1853), physician and philanthropist
- Gustav List (1835–1913), businessman and philanthropist
- Lucien Olivier (1838–1883), chef
- Pavel Petrovich Pahlen (1775–1834), cavalry general
- Leonid Timister (1844–1905), businessman and philanthropist
- Pavel Pabst (1854–1897) pianist, composer and teacher

== Soviet period and beyond ==
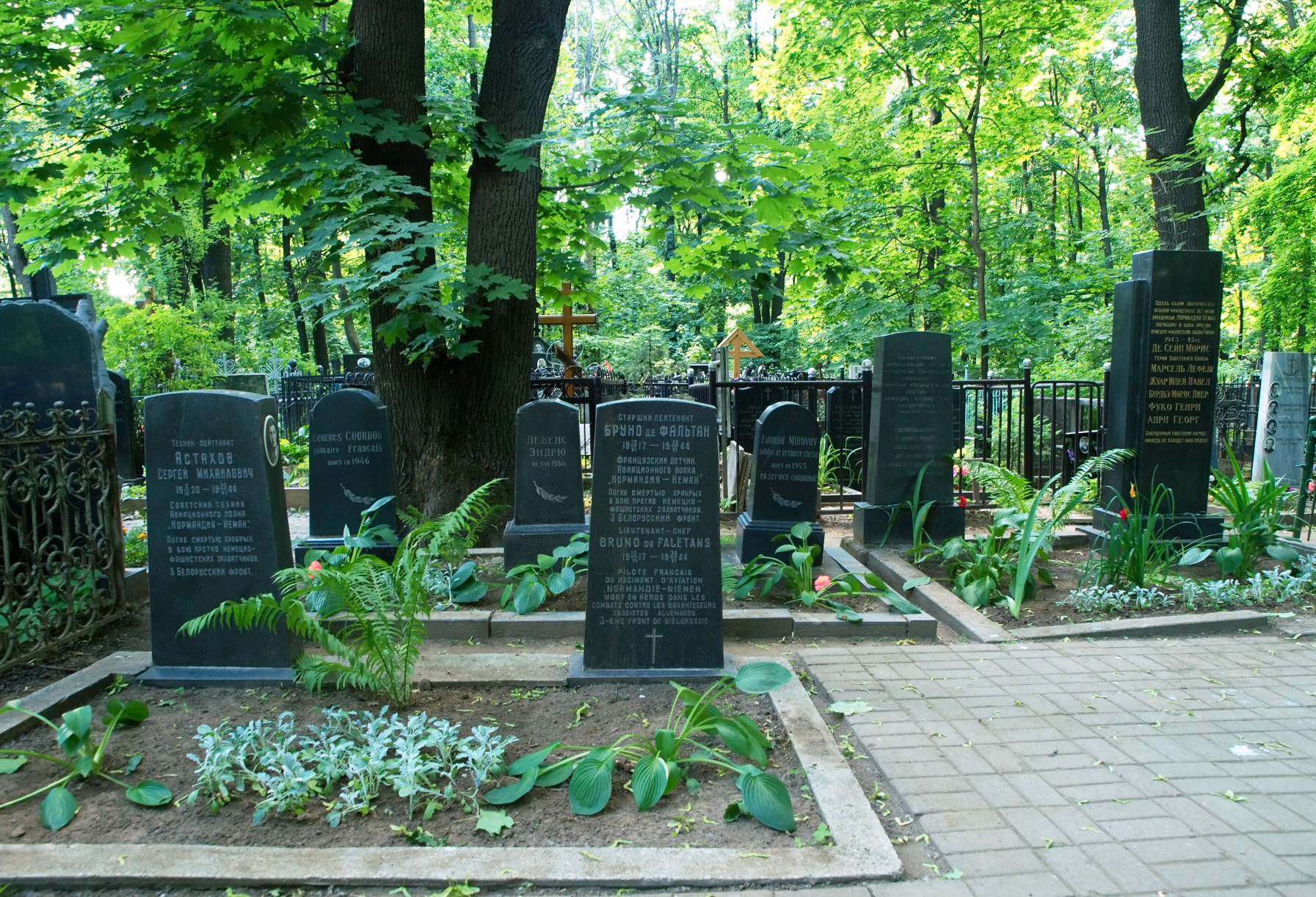
Graves of Normandie-Niemen servicemen on a lot adjacent to the French of 1812 obelisk

Upon secularization in 1918, new non-denominational graves gradually took over the older, untended, grave sites. As a result, today the historical graves are scattered among the majority of post-1918 graves.

During World War II, many soldiers who died in the nearby Lefortovo hospitals were buried here including 50 Heroes of the Soviet Union among whom was Stepan Kretov (1919–1975), and the deceased French pilots from the Normandie-Niemen regiment. The latter's remains were relocated to France in the 1950s, however one tomb of Unknown French Pilot, killed in action in July 1943, is still preserved.

The cemetery still allows burials; some historical family lots continue to date since early 19th century (some under original surnames, some under different ones when changed through marriage). In some instances, like the Pikersgills descending from Englishman John Pickersgill of Howgrave in Yorkshire (1765–1841), original lots were too small to accommodate future generations, and were eventually re-established on different sites.

=== Notable people buried in Soviet period ===
- Osip Abdulov, actor
- Vsevolod Abdulov, actor
- Yefim Baranovich (1884–1948), military leader
- Grigory Barkhin, architect
- Robert Bartini, aircraft designer
- Leonid Grossman (1888–1965), writer
- Anna Izryadnova (1891–1946), wife of Sergei Yesenin
- Karl Kipp (1965–1925), pianist and teacher
- Roman Klein (1858–1924), architect
- Nikolai Kolli (1894–1966), architect
- Nikolai Koltsov (1872–1940), biologist
- Ivan Sergeyevich Kuznetsov (1867–1942), architect
- Konstantin Melnikov (1890–1974), architect
- Sophia Parnok (1885–1933), poet
- Grigory Plaskov (1898–1972), military leader
- Valeri Popenchenko (1937–1975) Olympic Gold Medal-winning Boxer.
- Mikhail Prishvin (1873–1954), writer
- Ivan Rerberg (1869–1932), architect
- Alexander Filipovich Samoilov (1867–1930), physiologist
- Pyotr Sobolevsky (1904–1977), film actor
- Viktor Stanitsyn (1897-1976), film actor
- Mikhail Kuznetsov (1918-1986), film actor
- Ivan Susloparov (1897–1974), Red Army general who signed the first set of documents for unconditional surrender of Germany May 7, 1945 in Rheims
- Ivan Sytin (1851–1934), businessman, publisher and educator
- Metropolitan Trifon (Boris Petrovich Turkestanov, 1861–1934)
- Artists Victor Vasnetsov (1848–1926), Apollinary Vasnetsov (1856–1933) and Andrey Vasnetsov (1924–2009)
- Stanislav Vaupshasov (1899–1976), NKVD guerilla operative, Hero of the Soviet Union
- Maria Yudina (1899–1970), Russian pianist
- Mikhail Bakhtin (1895–1975), Russian philosopher

There is also a cenotaph to Iona Yakir (1896–1937).

== See also ==
- German Quarter
- Volkovo Cemetery
- Smolensky Cemetery
- Germans from Russia
