= Roderich von Erckert =

German ethnographer (1821–1900)

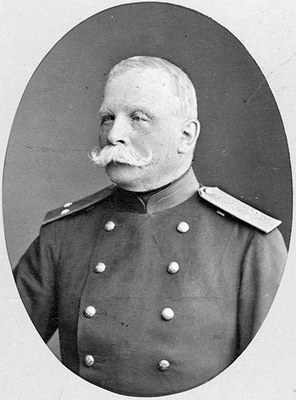
- Erckert, c. 1885
- Born: 15 December 1821
- Died: 12 December 1900 (aged 78)
- Scientific career
- Fields: Ethnography, Caucasians

Roderich von Erckert (15 December 1821 – 12 December 1900) was a German ethnographer, cartographer, and military officer in the Russian army. He was a member of the Russian Geographical Society. He was a military writer and published travel reports, scientific studies, and maps.

His earlier work focused on the Russian Empire, including ethnographic maps of present-day Estonia, Latvia, Lithuania, Belarus, and Poland. His later publications focused on the Caucasian languages and peoples, including Der Kaukasus und seine Völker and Die Sprachen des kaukasischen Stammes. In the last stage of his life, he turned his attention to Germanic history, publishing Wanderungen und Siedelungen der germanischen Stämme in Mitteleuropa.

== Works ==
- Russland, Carte éthnografique de l’Empire de Russie (Berlin, 1862)
- Atlas ethnographique des provinces habitées en totalité ou en partie par des Polonais (St. Pétersbourg, 1863)
- Der Kaukasus und seine Völker (1887)
- Der Ursprung der Kosaken, vorzüglich nach neuesten russischen Quellen (1882)
- Die Sprachen des kaukasischen Stammes (1895)
- Wanderungen und Siedelungen der germanischen Stämme in Mitteleuropa (1901)
