= Mikhail Mashkovsky =

Mikhail Davydovich Mashkovsky (Russian: Михаил Давыдович Машковский; 1 March 1908, Pinsk – 4 June 2002, Moscow) was a Soviet and Russian pharmacologist, and Academician of the Russian Academy of Sciences, the author of the famous Soviet and later on Russian pharmacopoeia "Medical compounds", which had 15 successful editions (the last 15th edition was published after his death in 2005 in Russia).

== Biography ==
He was born in Pinsk. In 1934 he graduated from Second Moscow Medical Institute named after Nikolay Pirogov. In 1938 he started his work at the National research institute for chemistry and pharmacy. In 1939 he got his PhD in pharmacology, his doctoral thesis dealt with pharmacology of respiratory analeptics and synthesis of originally soviet drug cytiton.

In 1941 he is recruited to the army and sent to the front. He worked as the chief toxicologist of the 3rd Ukrainian Front. He continued to publish scientific articles. For his military achievements he was awarded the Order of the Red Star, two Orders of the Patriotic War (1st and 2nd class).

In postwar time he continued to work in the same research institution, soon becoming its director. He remained on this position until his death in 2002.

In 1948 he finishes his habilitation work devoted to the pharmacology of alkaloids. Many classical Soviet drugs were first synthesized or tested in his lab. In total, more than 8000 compounds were tested for promising therapeutic effects.

Besides his work as the Head of the Pharmacopoeial Committee of Soviet Union, he during many years worked as an expert of WHO for quality control of medical compounds and a member of the United States Pharmacopeia Convention.

== Work on Soviet pharmacopoeia ==
The first edition of originally Soviet pharmacopoeia was published in 1954 with him as only author. The book soon became classical and was used both as pharmacopoeia and as a textbook for students of medicine and pharmacology.

Although the book did not actually have the status of official pharmacopoeia, it was the most known and the most used book whatever among medical and pharmaceutical professionals of Soviet Union.

Shortly after the publication of his book, Mashkovsky was accepted to the Pharmacopoeial Committee of Soviet Union, which he headed from 1960 to 1992 (from 1992 due to his retirement he worked as consultant and advisor). Under his supervision the 9th and 10th editions of the National Soviet pharmacopoeia were published.

From 1998 he was the head of editorial board of the Registry of Medical Compounds, which can be likened to the Pharmacopoeial Committee of Soviet Union.

== Awards and honors ==
- Hero of Socialist Labour (1991)
- Order of Lenin (1991)
- Order "For Merit to the Fatherland", 4th class (1998)
- Order of the Badge of Honour
- Order of Friendship of Peoples
- Order of the October Revolution
- Order of the Patriotic War, 1st and 2nd class
- Order of the Red Banner of Labour
- Order of the Red Star
