= Platon Zhukovich =

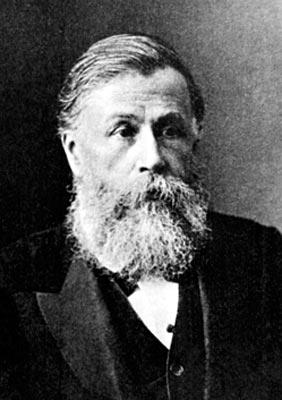
Platon Zhukovich

Platon Zhukovich (Russian: Плато́н Никола́евич Жуко́вич; 1857–1919) was an Imperial Russian historian and theologian.

== Biography ==
Born to a family of Russian Orthodox church official (protoiereus), in 1881 he graduated from the Saint Petersburg Theological Academy. He worked as a teacher at the Polotsk Theological School before moving to Vilna where he taught history of the Orthodox church at the local theological school.

In 1891 he returned to his alma mater as head of the historical faculty and in 1901 became an ordinary professor. In 1914 he joined the Imperial Russian Historical Society. During the Russian Revolution he was an active member of the 1917–18 Local Council of the Russian Orthodox Church. He died in 1919.
