= Ivan Fojnickij =

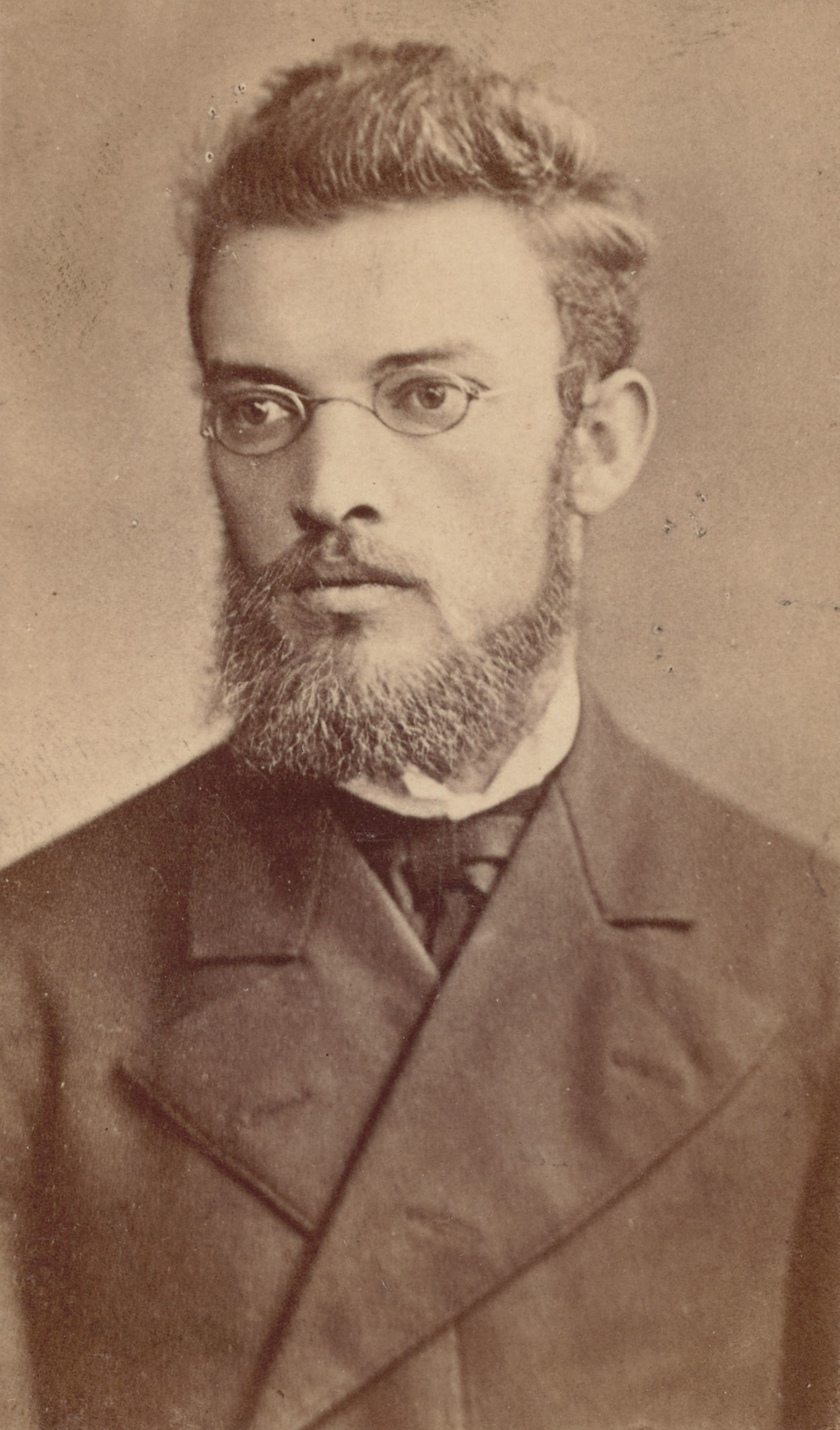
Ivan Jakovlevich Fojnickij

Ivan Jakovlevich Fojnickij (Russian: Иван Яковлевич Фойницкий) (1847–1913) was a leading theorist of criminal law in the late Russian Empire.

In 1877, Fojnickij was appointed senior public prosecutor in Saint Petersburg. He was also the chairman of the Russian section of the International Union of Criminologists and taught law at the Saint Petersburg State University from 1881 onwards.

A liberal constitutionalist and a follower of Franz von Liszt's theory of criminal law, Fojnickij was one of the principal advocates of criminal justice reform in Russia. The modernised Russian penal code of 1903 as well as the introduction of suspended sentences and prison labour in Russia trace back to proposals of his.
