= Komar University of Science and Technology =

Private university in Sulaymaniyah, Iraq

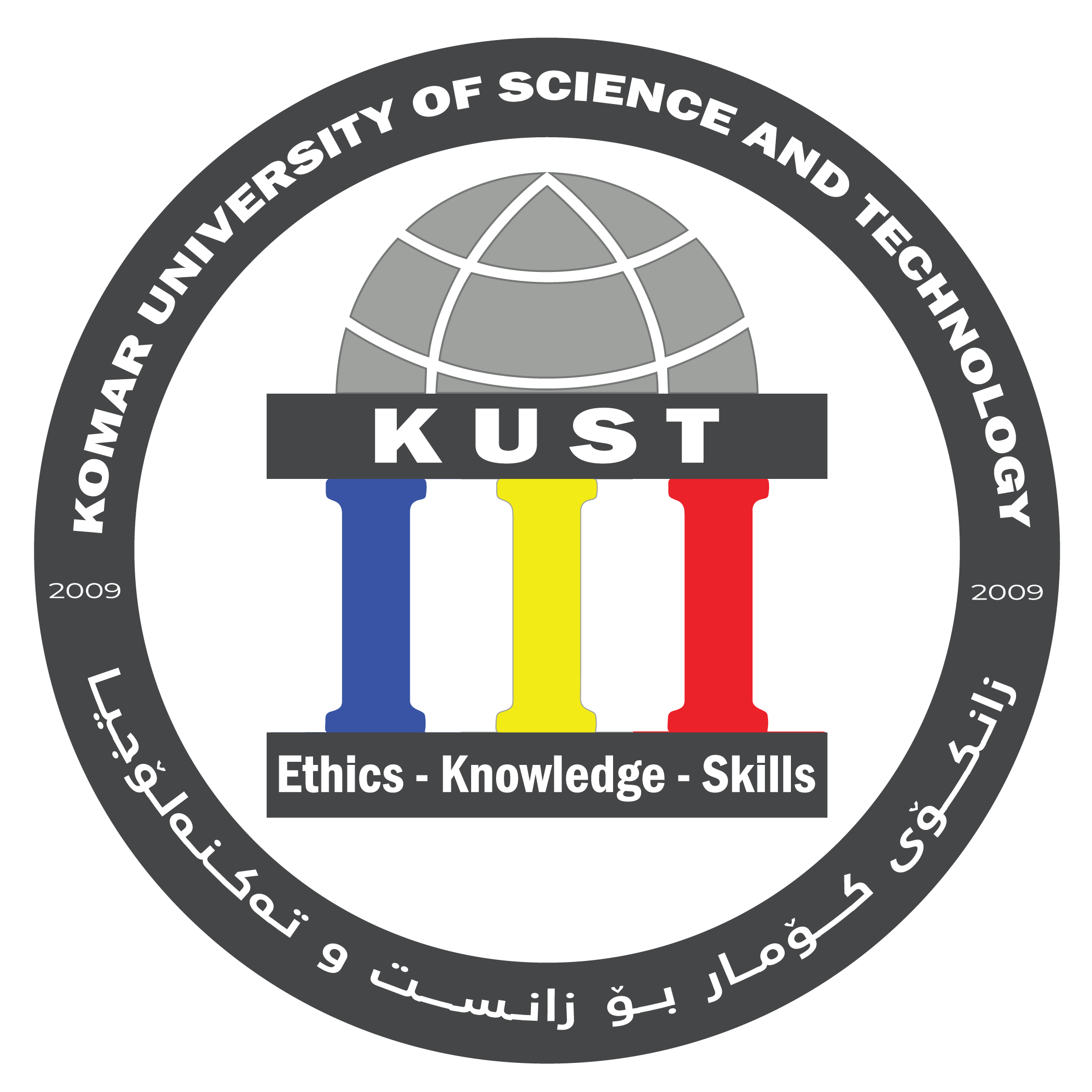
- Motto: Ethics Knowledge Skills.
- Type: Private
- Established: 2009
- President: Dr. Salahalddin Saeed
- Academic staff: >50
- Administrative staff: >40
- Undergraduates: 1000
- Location: Sulaymaniyah, Iraqi Kurdistan Region, Iraq; 35°35′32″N 45°21′43″E
- Campus: Suburb
- Colors: Blue, Yellow, and Red
- Website: www.komar.edu.iq

Komar University of Science and Technology (KUST) is a private university located in the city of Sulaymaniyah in Kurdistan region. It was founded in 2009.

== History ==
Komar University of Science and Technology (KUST) - Sulaimani was established and licensed by the Ministry of Higher Education and Scientific Research of the Kurdistan Regional Government, by the official letter no. 17867/7 on October 18, 2009. KUST is a private university governed by a board of trustees and run by an Administration Council. Its main campus is located in the city of Sulaimani, in Kurdistan- Iraq. KUST offered its first teaching classes in 2010 with an English language summer course (levels 1 and 3).

== Colleges ==
KUST has five colleges, the College of Business, the college of Medicine, the college of Dentistry, the College of Engineering, and the College of Sciences.

The College of Business has four departments:

- Department of Accounting
- Department of e-Commerce
- Department of Information Management
- Department of Business Administrative
- Computer Science

The college of medicine has 2 departments:

- Department of Pharmacy
- Department of Medical Laboratory Science
- It also has a pharmacy

The college of Dentistry has the department of Dentistry and a Dental clinic

The College of Engineering has four departments:

- Department of Computer Engineering
- Department of Civil Engineering
- Department of Environmental Engineering
- Department of Petroleum Engineering
