= Mikhail Kuchinsky =

Soviet Air Force officer

Mikhail Ivanovich Kuchinsky
- Михаил Иванович Кучинский
- Born: 23 December 1911; Prysna village, Mogilev Governorate, Russian Empire
- Died: 1 January 1995 (aged 83); Rostov-on-Don, Russia
- Military career
- Allegiance: Soviet Union
- Branch: Soviet Air Force
- Service years: 1932–1959
- Rank: Lieutenant colonel
- Unit: 218th Attack Aviation Regiment
- Conflicts: World War II; Battle of Kursk
- Awards: Hero of the Soviet Union; Order of Lenin; Order of the Red Banner (4x); Order of Alexander Nevsky; Order of the Patriotic War, 1st class; Order of the Patriotic War, 2nd class; Order of the Red Star

Mikhail Ivanovich Kuchinsky (Russian: Михаил Иванович Кучинский; 23 December 1911 – 1 January 1995) was a Belarusian Soviet Air Force Lieutenant colonel and Hero of the Soviet Union. Kuchinsky was awarded the title Hero of the Soviet Union and the Order of Lenin for his actions during World War II as deputy commander of a squadron in the 218th Attack Aviation Regiment from 1943. He continued his Air Force service postwar and worked in a factory following his retirement from the military.

== Early life ==
Kuchinsky was born on 23 December 1911 in the village of Prysna in Mogilev Governorate to a peasant family. He graduated from ninth grade and studied at the Mogilev Institute of Chemical Technology. Kuchinsky then worked at a silk factory.

In 1932, Kuchinsky was drafted into the Red Army. He graduated from the Tambov Military Aviation School in 1934.

== World War II ==
Kuchinsky fought in World War II from January 1943. He flew Ilyushin Il-2 attack aircraft with the 218th Attack Aviation Regiment of the 299th Assault Aviation Division. He was the deputy commander of a squadron. From 24 January, he flew missions in the Voronezh-Kastornensk operation. In the spring, Kuchinsky flew support missions for ground troops in offensive operations in the Orel region. During attacks on German airfields, Kuchinsky reportedly destroyed seven aircraft on the ground. In the summer, he fought in the Battle of Kursk and Operation Kutuzov. On 24 August, Kuchinsky was awarded the Order of the Red Banner. From 26 August to 30 September, he fought in the Chernigov-Pripyat Offensive, part of the Battle of the Dnieper. On 28 October, he was awarded the Order of the Red Banner a second time. Kuchinsky fought in the Gomel-Rechitsa Offensive in November.

In January 1944, Kuchinsky flew air support missions in the Kalinkovichi-Mozyr Offensive. He fought in the Rogachev-Zhlobin Offensive in February. On 2 March, he was awarded the Order of the Patriotic War 2nd class. From 24 to 29 June, he was involved in air combat during Operation Bagration. He then fought in the Minsk Offensive from 29 June to 4 July. On 4 July, he was awarded a third Order of the Red Banner. From 18 July, he fought in the Lublin–Brest Offensive. On 19 August, the regiment became the 173rd Guards Attack Aviation Regiment and the division became the 11th Guards Assault Aviation Division. By 26 August, Kuchinsky had reportedly made 93 successful combat missions in the Il-2. He reportedly destroyed 2 tanks, 52 vehicles, 6 guns, 11 antiaircraft positions, 3 fuel tanks, 7 aircraft on the ground, 2 warehouses with ammunition. Kuchinsky's sorties also reportedly killed 300 German soldiers.

On 14 January 1945, Soviet troops broke out of their bridgeheads on the Vistula, beginning the Vistula–Oder Offensive. The 173rd Guards Attack Aviation Regiment participated in the Warsaw-Poznan Offensive, which was part of the Vistula-Oder Offensive. On 6 February, he was awarded the Order of Alexander Nevsky. From 10 February, Kuchinsky fought in the East Pomeranian Offensive. On 24 March, he was awarded the title Hero of the Soviet Union and the Order of Lenin for his leadership. From 16 April, the regiment fought in the Berlin Offensive. By the war's end, Kuchinsky had made more than 130 sorties.

== Postwar ==
After the end of World War II, Kuchinsky continued to serve in the Soviet Air Force. In 1947, he graduated from the Higher Officers Flight-Tactical Training Courses. He retired in 1959 as a lieutenant colonel. Kuchinsky lived in Rostov-on-Don and until 1978 was chief of a stamp-engraving workshop in a factory. On 11 March 1985, he was awarded the Order of the Patriotic War 1st class on the 40th anniversary of the end of World War II. He died on 1 January 1995 and was buried in Rostov-on-Don's Severo cemetery.
