= Pyotr Stefanovsky =

Soviet general and test pilot

Pyotr Mikhailovich Stefanovsky
- Пётр Михайлович Стефановский
- Born: 2 January 1903; Chirkovichi village, Minsk Governorate, Russian Empire
- Died: 23 February 1976 (aged 73); Moscow, USSR
- Military career
- Allegiance: Soviet Union
- Branch: Soviet Air Force
- Service years: 1925 – 1954
- Rank: General-major
- Conflicts: World War II
- Awards: Hero of the Soviet Union

Pyotr Mikhailovich Stefanovsky (Russian: Пётр Михайлович Стефановский; 2 January 1903 — 23 February 1976) was a Soviet test pilot. During the Second World War, he was in charge of forming special fighter squadrons composed of Soviet test pilots and flew combat missions protecting the airspace above Moscow. He was promoted to Major General in 1944 and was awarded the title Hero of the Soviet Union in 1948.

Stefanovsky recounted his experiences as a test pilot in his book Триста неизвестных (Trista neizvestnykh, Three hundred of the unknown).
