= Yevgeny Ryndin =

Yevgeny Yuryevich Ryndin
- Евгений Юрьевич Рындин
- Born: 10 March 1972; Mingachevir, Azerbaijan SSR, Soviet Union
- Died: 30 March 1995 (aged 23); Achkhoy-Martan, Chechnya, Russia
- Military career
- Allegiance: Russia
- Branch: Internal Troops of the Ministry of Internal Affairs of Russia
- Rank: Lieutenant
- Unit: 46th Operational Regiment
- Conflicts: First Chechen War
- Awards: Hero of the Russian Federation

Yevgeny Yuryevich Ryndin (Russian: Евгений Юрьевич Рындин; 10 March 1972 – 30 March 1995, Mingachevir, Azerbaijan SSR, Soviet Union) was a Russian military officer who participated in the First Chechen War. He was posthumously awarded the title of Hero of the Russian Federation and the Gold Star medal.

== Early life and education ==
Yevgeny Ryndin was born on 10 March 1972 in Mingachevir, Azerbaijan SSR, Soviet Union.

Until 1982, he studied at Secondary School No. 6 in Kholmsk, Sakhalin Oblast. From 1983 to 1989, he studied at Secondary School No. 1 in Uzlovaya, Tula Oblast, graduating in 1989.

In 1989, Ryndin entered the S. M. Kirov Ordzhonikidze Higher Military Command School. He graduated in 1994 with honors.

== Military career ==
Lieutenant Ryndin began his officer service as a platoon commander in the 46th Operational Regiment of the 100th Operational Division of the Internal Troops of the Russian Ministry of Internal Affairs, part of the North Caucasus District. He served in two deployments to the North Caucasus.

Ryndin served several times in areas affected by emergencies and military conflicts. He was regarded by his colleagues as a reliable officer and was respected by the personnel under his command.

== Death ==
On 30 March 1995, Lieutenant Ryndin was serving as the commander of a post near Achkhoy-Martan during the First Chechen War. During the night, observers reported the movement of a group of unidentified armed men near a dairy farm located close to the post.

Ryndin and junior sergeant Alexander Krivokon proceeded towards the dairy farm. After examining the area, they moved farther towards a forest, where they were discovered by armed fighters.

A brief but intense firefight followed. The two servicemen used machine guns and grenade launchers against the attacking group. Ryndin ordered Krivokon to withdraw while he changed position and drew the attackers' fire towards himself.

Krivokon, who had been seriously wounded, was found by soldiers near the post early the following morning.

Ryndin was wounded in the legs and chest. He continued fighting until his ammunition was exhausted and was subsequently captured by the armed fighters. According to accounts of his death, he was tortured and killed. His burned body was later found in the forest.

Ryndin was buried at the New Cemetery in Uzlovaya, Tula Oblast.

== Awards ==
For courage and heroism demonstrated in the performance of his military duties, Lieutenant Yevgeny Yuryevich Ryndin was posthumously awarded the title of Hero of the Russian Federation by Presidential Decree No. 877 of 25 August 1995.
