= Yan Kuzenok =

Russian futsal player

Personal information
- Date of birth: June 11, 1993 (age 33)
- Place of birth: Russia
- Position: universal

Team information
- Current team: Dina Moscow
- Number: 8

Senior career*
Years	Team	Apps	(Gls)
2010–	Dina Moscow	128	(22)
- * Club domestic league appearances and goals as of 2 April 2015

Yan Kuzenok (born June 11, 1993) is a Russian futsal player who has played for Dina Moscow since 2010.

== Biography ==
Yan is a student of the Faculty of Physical Education and Sports in Podolsk Sports and Social Institute, graduate of the Kontakt sports club (Novy Urengoy).

As of December 16, 2014, he held 128 games and scored 22 goals for Dina Moscow. He played his 50th game in the XXI Russian Championship on March 3, 2013, in Yekaterinburg against Sinara. His 100th game was within the playoffs of the XXII Russian Championship on June 1, 2014, in Troitsk against “Gazprom-Yugra”.

== Achievements ==
- Bronze medalist of the tournament "Autumn in Petersburg" (2012/13) as a part of the youth team of Russia;
- Silver medalist of an exhibition tournament "Four Nations" (China);
- The winner of the Student World Championship (2014);
- Russian Futsal League Champion (2013/14).
