= Igor Rodobolsky =

Russian flight lieutenant (1960–2024)

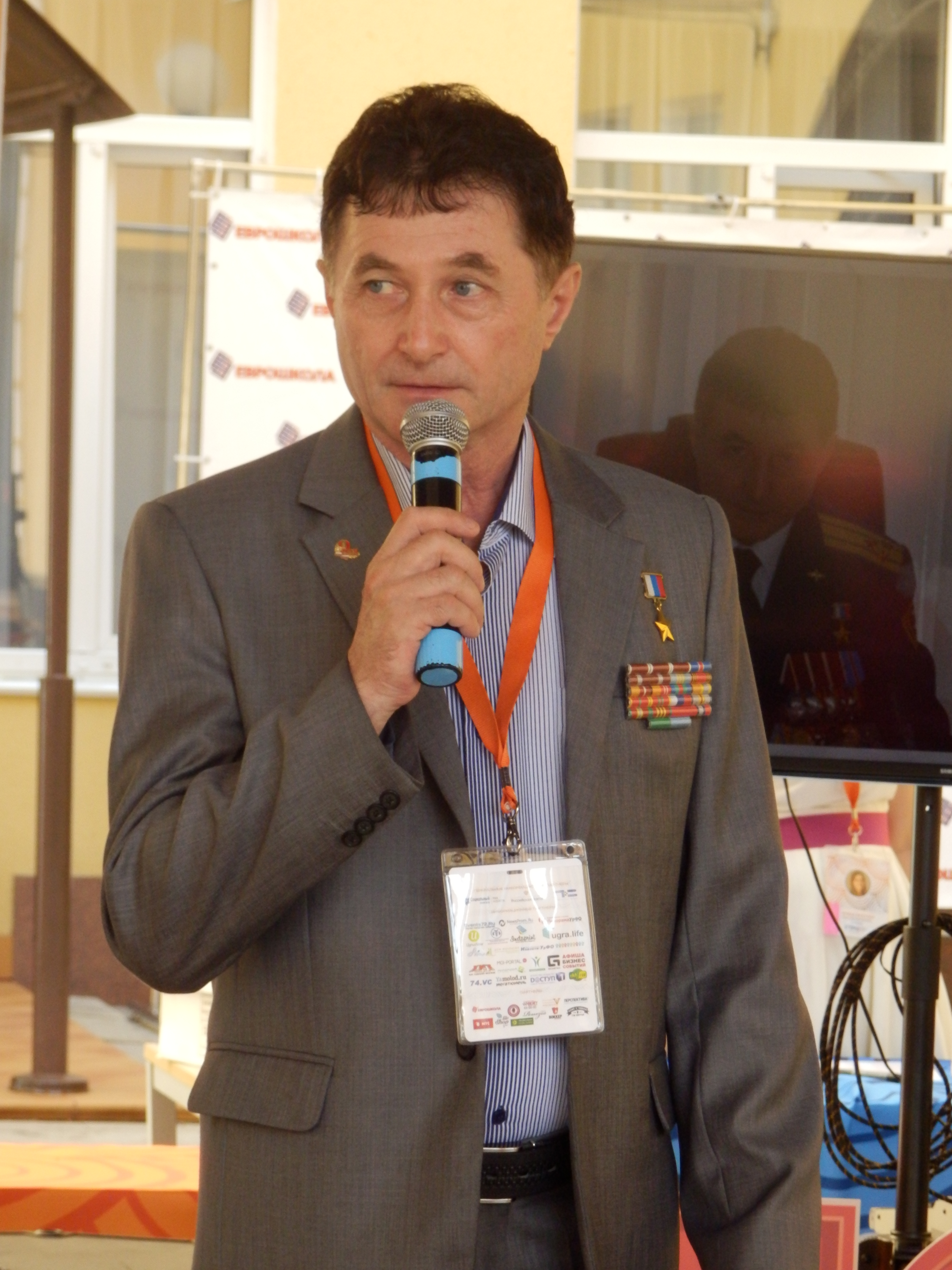
- Born: March 18, 1960; Grodno, Byelorussian Soviet Socialist Republic
- Died: September 20, 2024 (aged 64); Yekaterinburg, Russia

Igor Rodobolsky (March 18, 1960 - September 20, 2024) was the most decorated Russian veteran until his death in 2024. He served in the Soviet-Afghan War towards the end from 1986 to 1989, and he also served in the First and Second Chechen Wars. He became a Hero of the Russian Federation in 2003, and he was awarded the Order of the Red Star, the Order of Courage, the Order of Military Merit, and the Order "For Service to the Homeland in the Armed Forces of the USSR".
