= Semyon Sholkovich =

- Born: Semyon Vukolovich Sholkovich; Семён Вуколович Шолкович; 3 May 1840; Tonyezh, Mozyrsky Uyezd, Minsk Governorate, Russian Empire
- Died: 8 October 1886 (aged 46); Vilno, Lithuania
- Occupations: Writer, historian, pedagogue

Semyon Vukolovich Sholkovich (Russian: Семён Вуколович Шолкович, 3 May 1840, Tonyezh, Mozyrsky Uyezd, Minsk Governorate, Russian Empire – 8 October 1886, Vilno, Lithuania, then part of Russian Empire) was a Russian historian, journalist, philologist and pedagogue.

Sholkovich started his career as a journalist as a member of the staff of the Vilensky Vestnik (The Vilno Herald) newspaper, while serving as a Moskovskiye Vedomosti correspondent, writing on a wide range of subjects concerning history, philology and current politics. Among his scientifically acclaimed works were "On the Secret Societies of the North-Western Region of Russia in the Times of Prince A. Czartoryski" (published in Zarya, No.5, 1871), "On the History of the Polish Crown and the Grand Duchy of Lithuania" (1885) and "The Polish Case Concerning the Russian West" (1885–1887). He was a member of the Vilno Archaeological Commission.
