= Dmitry Kustanovich =

Belarusian-Russian artist

Dmitry Alexandrovich Kustanovich (Russian: Дми́трий Алекса́ндрович Кустано́вич; born March 29, 1970, in Minsk), nickname Kust (Russian: Куст) is a Belarusian-born artist who currently resides in Saint-Petersburg, Russia.

Kustanovich graduated from the Belarusian State Pedagogical University in 1996, served in the Soviet Army and worked as a construction worker.

He developed an original technique based on the wider use of palette knives rather than brushes. He has said:

I model the space with the palette knife expressing its to-day state, its momentousnesses, its current minute. This is my technique. It is emotional. It has its own philosophy. The world expressed through it is manifolded. It is different.

The technique has elements of the impressionism, expressionism, primitive art, conceptual art.

Since 1996 Kustanovich has participated in a number of personal exhibitions in Minsk, Moscow, Germany, France, Lithuania, Netherlands, Portugal.

== Gallery ==
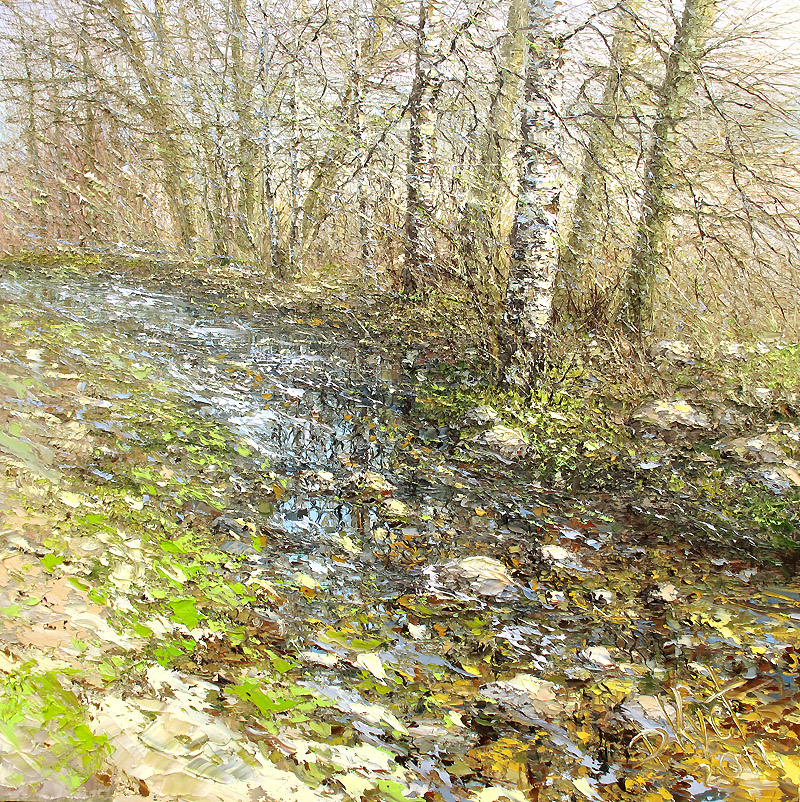
Весенний ручей. Холст, масло, 2011.

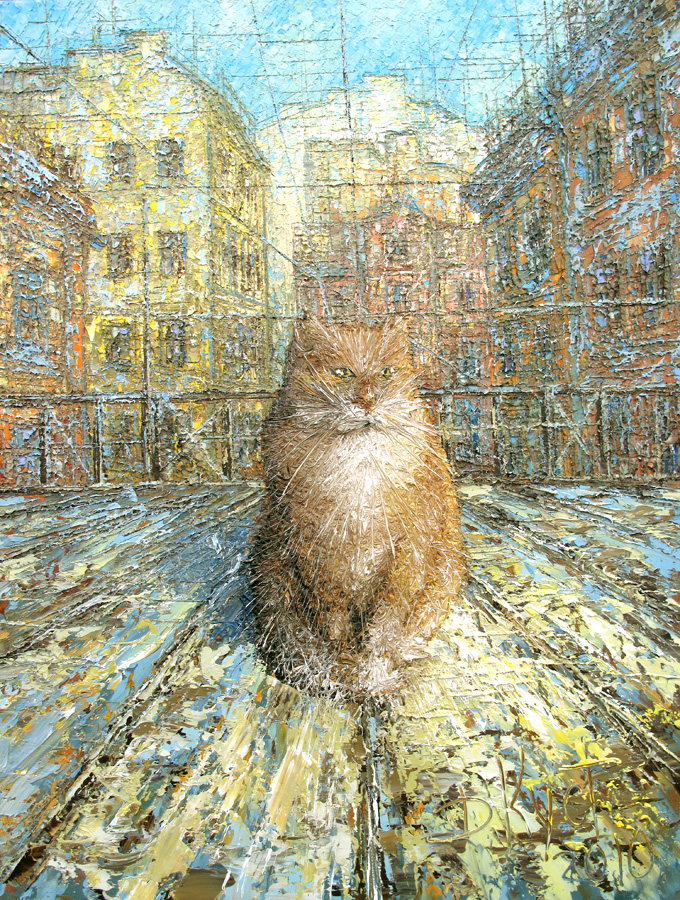
Рыжий питерский кот. Холст, масло, 2010.

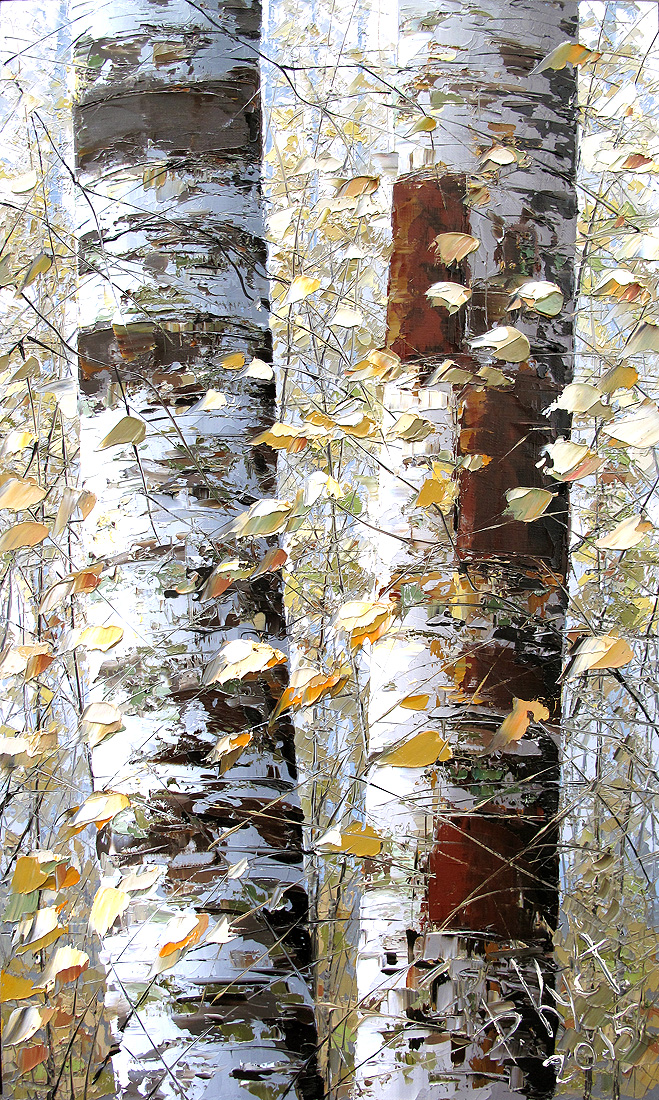
Осенние березы. Холст, масло, 2015.

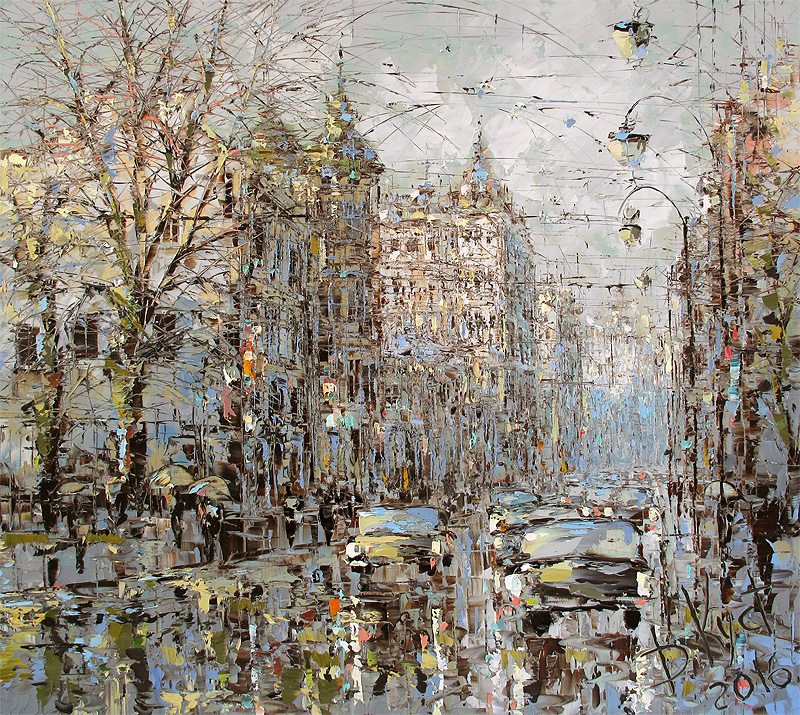
Ранняя весна в Петербурге. Холст, масло, 2016.
