= Yefim Baranovich =

- Born: 1884; Smolensk Governorate, Russian Empire
- Died: 1948 (aged 63–64); Moscow, RSFSR, Soviet Union
- Burial place: Vvedenskoye Cemetery, Moscow
- Military career
- Allegiance: Russian Empire; Soviet Russia (1919–1922); Soviet Union (1919–1944)
- Branch: (Russian Empire) Imperial Russian Army; Red Army
- Rank: Major-general
- Commands: 48th Rifle Division (1920–1922)
- Conflicts: Russo-Japanese War; World War I; Russian Civil War; Polish-Soviet War; World War II

Yefim Vikentyevich Baranovich (Russian: Ефи́м Вике́нтьевич Барано́вич; 1884–1948) was an Imperial Russian and Soviet career military officer whose service spanned the Russo-Japanese War, World War I, the Russian Civil War and the concurrent Polish-Soviet War, and World War II.

A colonel of the Imperial Russian Army at the time of the Russian Revolution of 1917, Baranovich was made a major-general in 1940. He served as deputy commander of the 1st Tank Army / 1st Guards Tank Army in 1943–1944.

== Biography ==
Yefim Vikentyevich Baranovich was born in 1884 in the Smolensk Governorate of the Russian Empire to a local family of noble status but poor material means.

A professional officer in the Imperial Russian Army before the Revolution, he served in the Russo-Japanese War and World War I and joined the Red Army at the height of the post-revolutionary Russian Civil War in 1919, in which he served as a battalion and regiment commander. Promoted to lead the 48th Rifle Division within the 16th ("Western") Army during the Polish-Soviet War between Soviet Russia and Józef Piłsudski's Poland, he subsequently served as commander of the 48th Division from 5 July 1920 to 1 January 1922.

Baranovich was made a major-general when the traditional generals' ranks were first introduced into the Red Army in June 1940. He was appointed to the Workers' and Peasants' Red Army Mechanization and Motorization Academy (a predecessor of the Combined Arms Academy of the Armed Forces of the Russian Federation) in Moscow in autumn 1940.

Major-General Baranovich was named deputy commander of Colonel-General Mikhail Katukov's 1st Tank Army (redesignated the 1st Guards Tank Army in April 1944) in February 1943.

The 1st Tank Army went on to fight at the Battle of Kursk in the summer of 1943, which spelled the end of German strategic initiative on the war's Eastern Front, and the Lvov-Sandomierz Offensive in the summer of 1944, where the Soviet forces prevailed over the occupation armies of Axis Germany and Hungary in what is now western Ukraine and eastern Poland.

With declining health, the major-general was succeeded in the position of deputy commander of the 1st Tank Army by Lieutenant-General Andrei Getman in August 1944 and placed in retirement.

He died in 1948 and was interred at the Vvedenskoye Cemetery in Moscow.
