= The Simpleton =

Novel by Alexei Pisemsky

- Author: Alexei Pisemsky
- Original title: Тюфяк
- Language: Russian
- Publication date: 1850
- Publication place: Russia
- Media type: Print (paperback & hardback)

The Simpleton (Russian: Тюфя′к, romanized: Tyufyak, translated also as The Muff) is the debut novel by Alexei Pisemsky, written in the late 1840 and first published in October and November 1850 by Moskvityanin. The novel has met critical acclaim and made Pisemsky a popular author.

== Background ==
In his autobiography Pisemsky wrote: "In 1846 I completed a large novel called Boyarschina. In 1847 I sent it to Otechestvennye Zapiski and it was banned by the censors. By this time, while in the country, I've written another novel, Tyufyak, but, defeated already in my aspirations, decided against sending it [to the publishers] and resumed my state service." Here Pisemsky got the date wrong: Boyarshina was sent to OZ in 1848 and, as the Soviet scholar Mikhail Eryomin noted, "there are reasons to believe that The Simpleton' rough copy was ready in 1848, too."

In the Stellovsky Publishers's (Saint Petersburg, 1861) edition the novel came out as dated "29 April 1850". On April 21, Pisemsky wrote to Alexander Ostrovsky: "I send you, my dear Alexander Nikolayevich, my book for you to decide what to do with it. I gave it the title "The Family Dramas" (Семейные драмы), but should it appear to be incompatible either with the censorial demands or the magazine's general mood, please change it to whatever you like: "Bashmetyev", "The Muff", whatever. I send you only the first part of it, but rest assured, the second one is ready, just needs some polishing done."

Pisemsky was working upon the second part through the summer of 1850. He formulated the novel's general idea in his April 21 letter to Ostrovsky:

What I wanted to do by describing the ordinary lives of the ordinary people was highlight the dramas we all of us encounter, dramas which every man get through in his own special way. Social issues I did not touch, restricting myself to family relations. As for characters, the major one is Bashmetyev; on the one hand, a sophisticated man, on the other, apathetic, unsociable and having a limited, formal education. He encounters real life for the first time when returning home after the graduation and instead of developing him, real life starts tormenting him. Having got nothing by way of guiding light, he starts making horrible blunders which result in this mad marriage of his, in part one. As for other characters, they, I presume, explain themselves fairly well.

The Simpleton passed the censorship without trouble. On 4 September Mikhail Pogodin received the rest of the manuscript and the magazine published the novel in its October and November 1850 issues.

== Reception ==
The early reviews of The Simpleton were positive, although, coming from different literary camps, each carried its own ideological agenda. The anonymous Otechestvennye Zapiski reviewer called it the best work of fiction published in Russia in 1850 and praised the author's "gift for depicting the real life, backed up by serious attitude."

Alexander Druzhinin in his otherwise warm review found the Mansurov character too similar to Gogol's Nozdryov (Otechestvennye Zapiski's reviewer agreed with him on that). Druzhinin stated that Pisemsky rather "spoiled the character of Beshmetyev… by giving him some trivial, hackneyed qualities" and found The Simpleton not entertaining enough. Disputing some of Vissarion Belinsky's ideas, the critic suggested that the formula of success was, "simplicity of details, intricacy of fantasy," something that he deemed Pisemsky's novel, apparently, as lacking.

Critic Stepan Dudyshkin in his "Russian Literature in 1850" review found Pisemsky's debut novel's characters too grotesque, Bashmetyev's major weakness being his "inability to act." Alexander Ostrovsky in his large essay published in Moskvityanin, praised the novel's originality. Several years later Apollon Grigoriev, reviewing several Pisemsky's books argued that The Simpleton (unlike his later stories) had nothing to do with Gogol's school of realism.

After the 1861 release of the first volume of the Stellovsky's edition of Pisemsky's Selected Works, Dmitry Pisarev subjected the novel to thorough analysis in the article called "Silent Waters". The radical critic's general verdict was that the novel's idea was to show that the Russians, leading the kind of lives they do lead, were "ignorant of the better options and incapable to recognize the very extent of their own suffering."
