= Naturalism (theatre) =

Movement in European drama

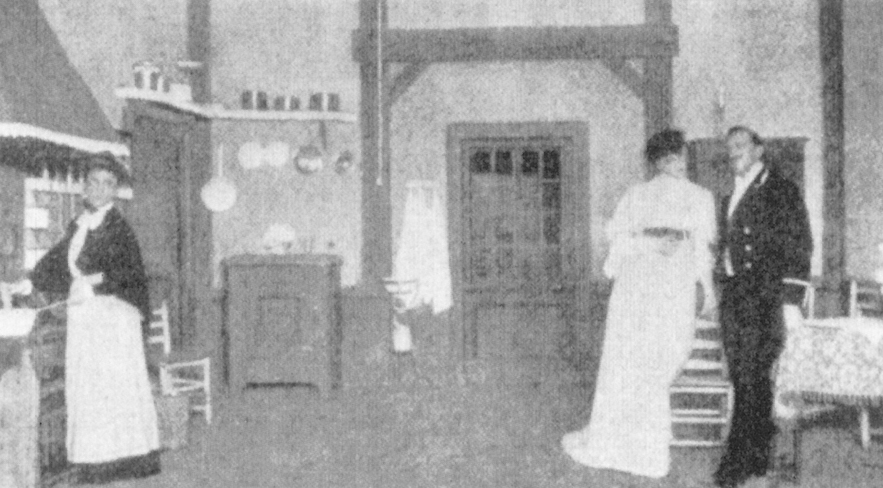
Photograph of the first production in Stockholm of August Strindberg's 1888 naturalistic play Miss Julie in November 1906, at The People's Theatre

Naturalism is a movement in European drama and theatre that developed in the late 19th and early 20th centuries. It refers to theatre that attempts to create an illusion of reality through a range of dramatic and theatrical strategies. Interest in naturalism especially flourished with the French playwrights of the time, but the most successful example is Strindberg's play Miss Julie, which was written with the intention to abide by both his own particular version of naturalism, and also the version described by the French novelist and literary theoretician, Emile Zola.

Zola's term for naturalism is la nouvelle formule. The three primary principles of naturalism (faire vrai, faire grand and faire simple) are first, that the play should be realistic, and the result of a careful study of human behaviour and psychology. The characters should be flesh and blood; their motivations and actions should be grounded in their heredity and environment. The presentation of a naturalistic play, in terms of the setting and performances, should be realistic and not flamboyant or theatrical. The single setting of Miss Julie, for example, is a kitchen. Second, the conflicts in the play should be issues of meaningful, life-altering significance — not small or petty. And third, the play should be simple — not cluttered with complicated sub-plots or lengthy exposition.

Darwinism pervades naturalistic plays, especially in the determining role of the environment on character, and as motivation for behavior. Naturalism emphasizes everyday speech forms; plausibility in the writing (no ghosts, spirits or gods intervening in the human action); a choice of subjects that are contemporary and reasonable (no exotic, otherworldly or fantastic locales, nor historical or mythic time-periods); an extension of the social range of characters portrayed (not only the aristocrats of classical drama but also bourgeois and working-class protagonists) and social conflicts; and a style of acting that attempts to recreate the impression of reality.

Naturalism was first advocated explicitly by Émile Zola in his 1880 essay entitled Naturalism on the Stage.

== Influences ==
Naturalistic writers were influenced by the theory of evolution of Charles Darwin. They believed that one's heredity and social environment determine one's character. Whereas realism seeks only to describe subjects as they really are, naturalism also attempts to determine "scientifically" the underlying forces (i.e. the environment or heredity) influencing the actions of its subjects. Naturalistic works are opposed to romanticism, in which subjects may receive highly symbolic, idealistic, or even supernatural treatment. They often include uncouth or sordid subject matter; for example, Émile Zola's works had a frankness about sexuality along with a pervasive pessimism. Naturalistic works exposed the dark harshness of life, including poverty, racism, sex, prejudice, disease, prostitution, and filth. As a result, Naturalistic writers were frequently criticized for being too blunt.

== Plays of naturalism ==
- Woyzeck (1837) by Georg Büchner – considered a forerunner to Naturalism
- A Bitter Fate (1859) by Aleksey Pisemsky
- The Power of Darkness (1886) by Leo Tolstoy
- The Father (1887) by August Strindberg
- Miss Julie (1888) by August Strindberg
- Creditors (1889) by August Strindberg
- The Weavers (1892) by Gerhart Hauptmann
- Drayman Henschel (1898) by Gerhart Hauptmann
- Uncle Vanya (1898) by Anton Chekhov
- The Cherry Orchard (1904) by Anton Chekhov
- A Doll's House (1879) by Henrik Ibsen

== See also ==
- Naturalism (art)
- Naturalism (literature)
- Philosophical naturalism
- Sociological naturalism
- Realism in the arts
- Realism in theatre
- Kitchen sink drama
