= An Old Man's Sin =

Novella by Alexsey Pisemsky

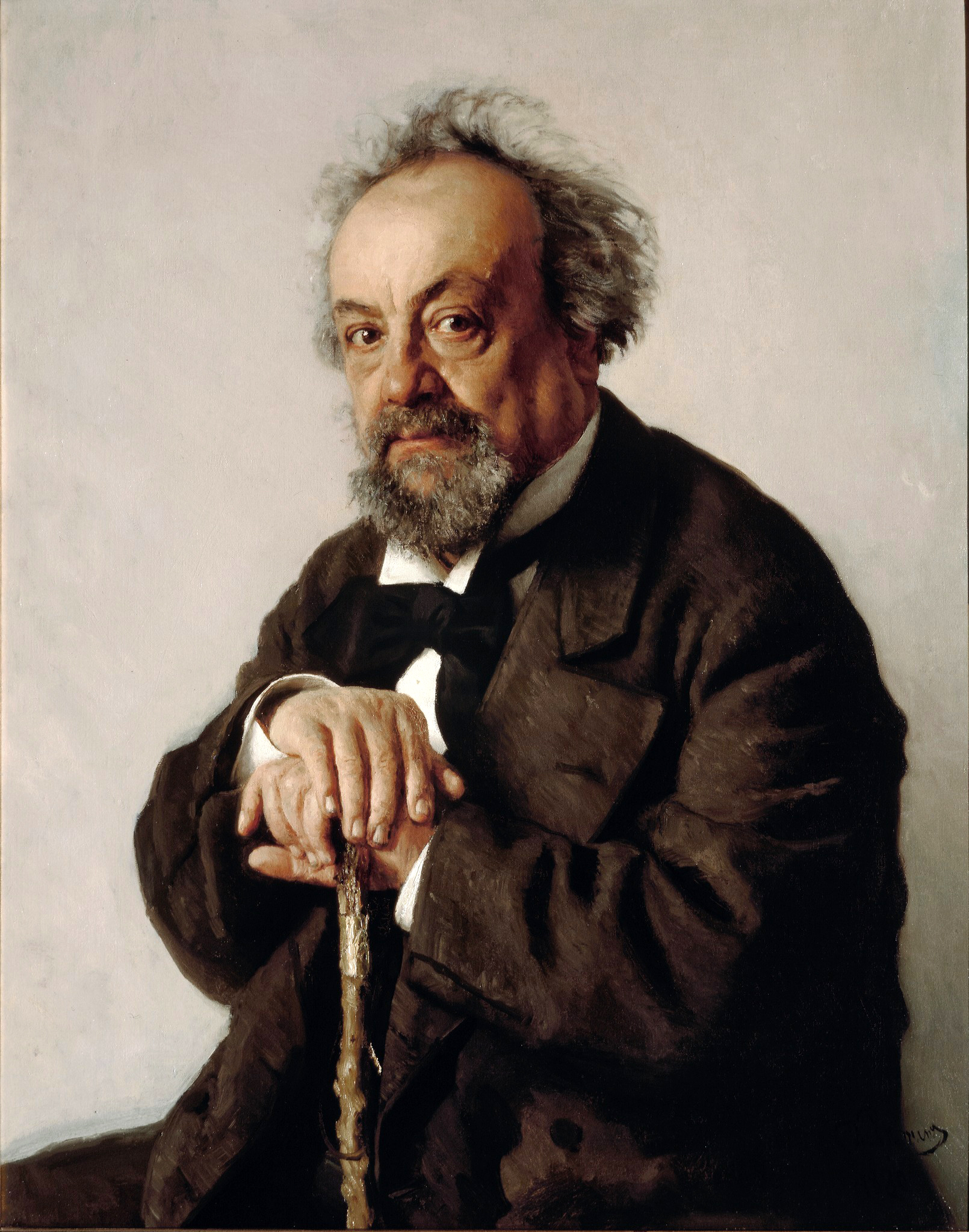
Portrait of Pisemsky by Ilya Repin

An Old Man's Sin (Russian: Старческий грех) is an 1861 novella by Aleksey Pisemsky. It first appeared in Biblioteka Dlya Chteniya's January 1861 issue, dated as "23 November 1860, Petersburg" and later that year was included into the Works by A.F. Pisemsky, compiled and published by Fyodor Stellovsky.

== Plot summary ==
The novella depicts the life of a provincial serviceman from his childhood to his death. Iosaf Ferapontov lives in a world of backwardness, abusive seminarian schooling, selfish nobles, and ugly serfdom. These are all shown in an uncompromising realistic style by Pisemsky.

Ferapontov is a lover of literature and art who first makes it through school, and then is given a civil service post, where he serves faithfully and honestly until he's middle-aged. He then meets a beautiful young woman named Emilia Kostyryova and a man named Brzestowski who claims to be her brother. The two convince Ferapontov that they need more than two thousand rubles to settle the young woman's outstanding debts. Kostyryova uses charm and sex appeal to bring Ferapontov under her influence.

Ferapontov first visits several local landowners to try and find one who will loan him the needed money. He meets with nothing but dishonest and hard-hearted nobles who treat him disrespectfully and decline his loan proposals.

Ferapontov then goes back to work at his office and a large sum of money is soon deposited with him by the representative of a rich local count. Instead of entering the deposit in the records, he steals the money and places it in the account of Emilia Kostyryova. He is soon arrested and learns that Kostyryova and Brzestowski have used the money to marry, and that the story of debt was a trick. Ferapontov is put in jail where he hangs himself in his cell.

== Criticism ==
An Old Man's Sin is an important work in Pisemsky's career as a writer. Pisemsky depicts Ferapontov's difficult life and makes him a sympathetic character without using any sentimentality. The Russian critic Mikhail De Pulet said of Pisemsky in a review of An Old Man's Sin that "the power of Pisemsky's talent is a cold and external force; it will strike you with a brilliant flash, but will not warm your soul; it will make you shudder but not weep... This power represents both the triumph and, no doubt, also the torments of his talent.
