= Philistines (disambiguation) =

The Philistines were a people who once occupied the south-western part of Canaan.

Philistines or philistine may also refer to:

- Peleshet, land of Philistine in the ancient times (12th century BC)
- Residents of the region of Palestine, sometimes referred to as 'Philistines' by British writers of the 18th and very early 19th century, though the ancient Philistines were a distinct people from the Arabs later referred to as Palestinians
- Philistine, a term for a person hostile to intellectual pursuits, such as art, science or the study of humanity. Can also describe a person who values material possessions or the accumulation of wealth above all else
- An elite unit of the South African Defence Force
- The Philistines (Pisemsky novel), an 1877 novel by Alexey Pisemsky
- The Philistines, a 1901 play by Maxim Gorky
- The Philistine, a periodical that was written, edited, and published by Elbert Hubbard

== See also ==
- Palestine (disambiguation)
- The Philisteins (1985–1992), an Australian garage punk band
- The Philistines Jr., an American rock band
