= Masons (novel) =

1880 novel by Alexey Pisemsky

- Author: Alexey Pisemsky
- Original title: Масоны
- Language: Russian
- Publisher: Ogonyok (original); Khudozhestvennaya Literatura
- Publication date: 1880
- Publication place: Russian Empire
- Media type: Print (Paperback & Hardback)
- Preceded by: The Philistines (1877)

Masons (Russian: Масоны) is a novel by Alexey Pisemsky started in the late 1878 and first published in 1880 in Ogonyok magazine (Nos. 1–6, 8-43). Pisemsky who regarded the Freemasonry as a progressive force in Russia of the 1820s and 1830s based the narrative upon his personal childhood memories of the people he knew (among them his uncle Yury Bartenev) who belonged to the lodge.
