= Pavel Svinyin =

Russian painter (1787–1839)

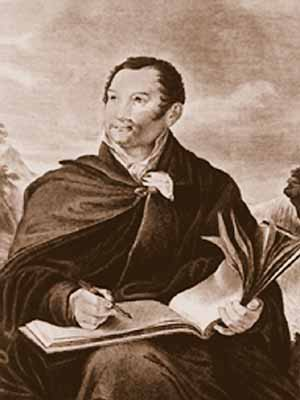
Pavel Svinyin

Pavel Petrovich Svinyin or Svinin (Russian: Па́вел Петро́вич Свиньи́н; 19 June 1787 – 21 April 1839) was a Russian writer, painter, and editor, known as a "Russian Munchausen" for many exaggerated accounts of his travels. He was Appolon Maykov's brother-in-law and Aleksey Pisemsky's father-in-law.

== Biography ==
Svinyin, an inveterate Anglophile, accompanied Dmitry Senyavin in the Russian Imperial Navy's 1806 Second Archipelago Expedition into the Mediterranean and was employed at the Russian consulate in Philadelphia, Pennsylvania, between 1811 and 1813. He was an aide-de-camp to General Moreau and was present when he died. His first book, Sketches of Moscow and St. Petersburg (1813), made its first appearance in Pennsylvania in English. He left one of the first written depictions of black church music in the United States and launched the publication of the literary magazine Otechestvennye Zapiski in 1818.

Svinyin was on friendly terms with many leading Russian writers, including Pushkin and Gogol, and promoted the careers of talented peasants. In 1830, he left Moscow and settled at his country estate near Galich. Svinin wrote several historical novels and plays, a guide to St. Petersburg and its suburbs (in five volumes, 1816–28) and a catalogue of the Kremlin Armoury (1826). His personal collection, known as the "Russian Museum", featured a number of valuable paintings, statues, manuscripts, antiques, coins, and gems. It was auctioned off in 1834.

== Svinyin's watercolors ==
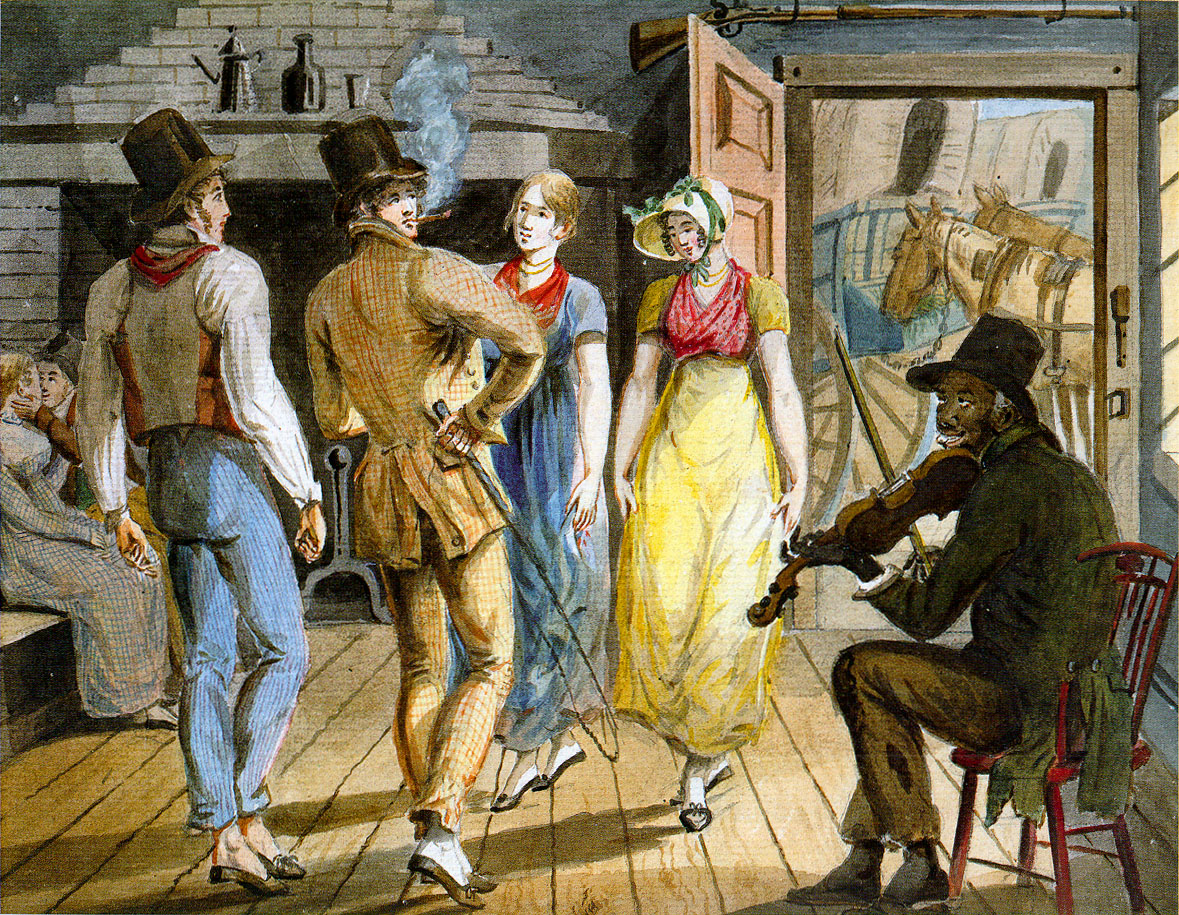
Merrymaking at a Wayside Inn, a watercolor by Pavel Svinyn of his trip to the United States in the early 1810s.

As secretary to the Russian diplomatic representative in the early 1810s, Svinyin painted a number of watercolors of life in America. Later he published the book Voyage Pittoresque Aux Etats-Unis de l'Amérique par Paul Svignine en 1811, 1812, et 1813.

Thr painting Merrymaking at a Wayside Inn depicts travelers grabbing a hurried and impromptu dance on the road in early-1810s America (in rural Pennsylvania), and shows practices which would have been considered inelegant or shockingly informal in many socially genteel circles in Europe at the time (such as smoking in the presence of ladies, smoking indoors, a man taking off his tailcoat in the presence of ladies—leaving him wearing only his waistcoat and shirt on top—and holding onto one's horsewhip while dancing). Only one of the women has bothered to take off her bonnet. One of the dancing men is not wearing socks/stockings.

At left, a couple is indulging in what could be considered an inappropriate public display of affection by some European standards of etiquette, while at right, a black fiddler provides the music for the dance. Wagons can be seen outside the door.

== See also ==
- Fyodor Karzhavin, a Russian writer who lived in Virginia between 1777 and 1788
- List of Russian artists
- List of Russian writers
