= A Bitter Fate =

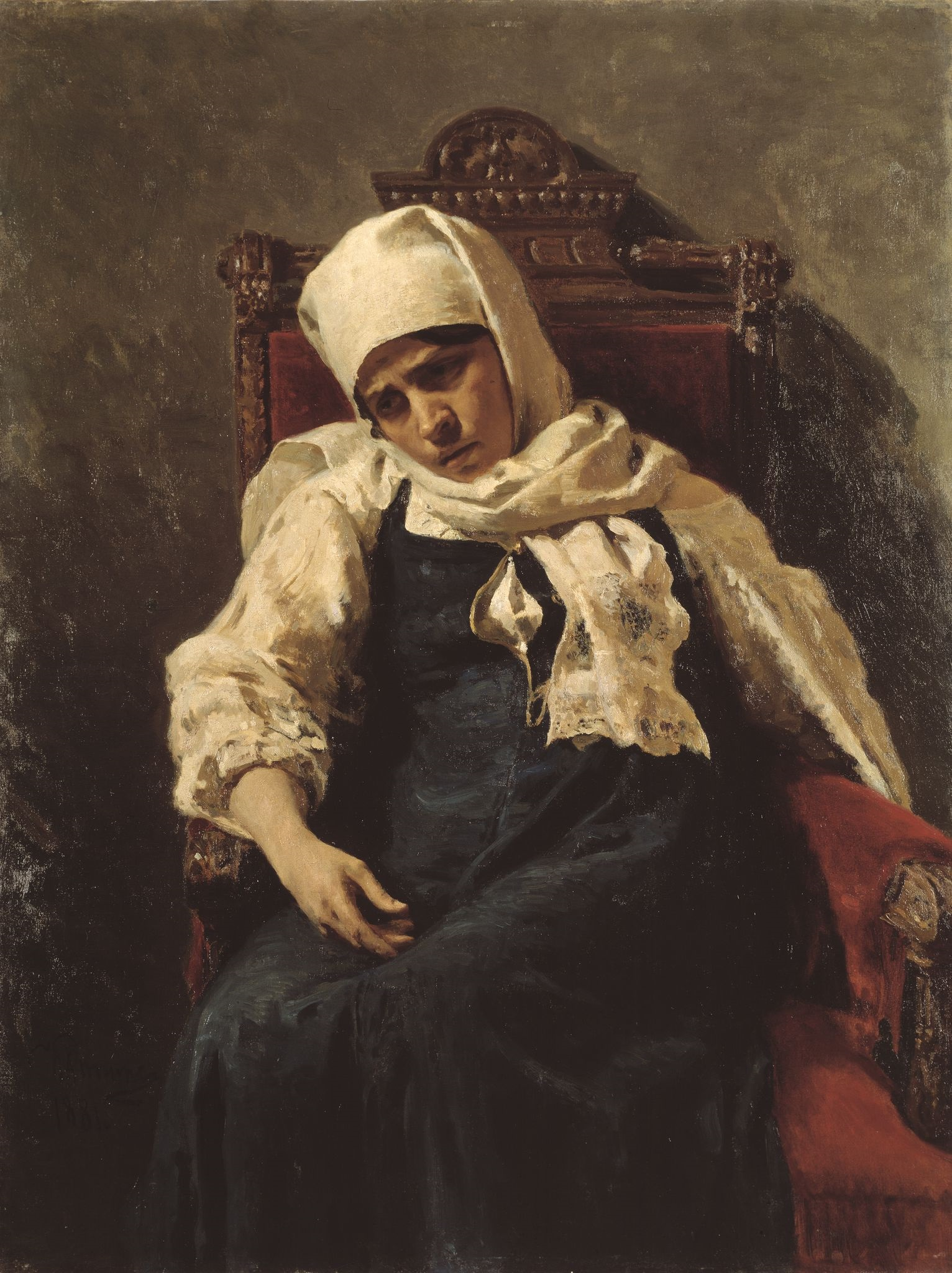
- Ilya Repin's portrait of Polina Strepetova as Lizaveta, the protagonist of A Bitter Fate.
- Original title: Russian: Горькая судьбина
- Written by: Aleksey Pisemsky
- Original language: Russian
- Subject: Serfdom in Russia
- Genre: Realistic tragedy

Premiere

A Bitter Fate (Russian: Горькая судьбина, Gorkaya sudbina), also translated as A Bitter Lot, is an 1859 realistic play by Aleksey Pisemsky. It is a story of a peasant woman, who, while her husband was away for quitrent works, had been seduced by a young pomeshchik and had brought him a child. The four-act play tackles Russian serfdom and the social and moral divisions that it creates.

It was started in early 1859 in St. Petersburg, finished on 19 August and first published by Biblioteka Dlya Chteniya in November that year, It was not put on stage for several years.

The play is available in English translation in Masterpieces of the Russian Drama, Volume 1, edited by George Rapall Noyes, Dover Publications, 1961.

== Plot ==
In the first act, Ananiy Yakovlev, a peasant-pitershchik (Note: Pitershchik is the serf peasant who does his quit-rent in "Piter" i.e., St. Petersburg)) returns home and learns from his drinking buddy that he has become a kind of brother-in-law of the local pomeshchik Cheglov-Sokovin (Чеглов-Соковин). Ananiy questions his wife Lizaveta, starts shaming her angrily, and eventually agrees to recognize the child as his own, provided she will not continue the affair, or else...

The second act is at the manor of Cheglov-Sokovin, who appears to be a heavy drinker. Saltykov-Shchedrin describes him as being in a "drunken-liberal-stupid" state. Here comes the Cheglov's estate manager (burmistr) and reports that Lizaveta complains about his husband. Lizaveta breaks her promise from the first act not to see Cheglov anymore and asks him to talk Ananiy to his senses. Cheglov calls Ananiy in and threatens him.

In the third act Ananiy still tries to convince Lizaveta to behave, but she talks back. Amid their talk, the burmistr comes and announces that Cheglov is taking Lizaveta with her child. In a quarrel behind curtains Ananiy kills the child.

Saltykov-Shchedrin writes that the third act is in fact the end of the drama, and the fourth act is added only to "introduce a dandy official of the "new guys" kind, who is straining himself to discover the truth in the matter and who limits his zeal to various vulgarities and vileness."

== Commentary ==
The Cambridge History of Russian Literature expresses an opinion that with the exception of Leo Tolstoy's The Power of Darkness (1886), it is the only major play to dramatise the experiences of Russian serfs in the history of Russian realistic drama.

Saltykov-Shchedrin published a harshly critical review of the play, while some other critics praised it. It has later been described as a masterpiece of the Russian theatre and the first Russian realistic tragedy.

== Sources ==
- Banham, Martin, ed. 1998. The Cambridge Guide to Theatre. Cambridge: Cambridge UP. ISBN 0-521-43437-8.
- Eriksen, Gordon, Garrard MacLeod, and Martin Wisneski, ed. 1960. Encyclopædia Britannica 15th Edition. Volume 9.
- Moser, Charles A., ed. 1992. The Cambridge History of Russian Literature. Rev. ed. Cambridge: Cambridge UP. ISBN 0-521-42567-0.
