= In the Whirlpool =

1871 novel by Aleksey Pisemsky

- Author: Aleksey Pisemsky
- Original title: В водовороте
- Language: Russian
- Publisher: Beseda magazine
- Publication date: 1871
- Publication place: Russian Empire
- Media type: Print (hardback & paperback)

In the Whirlpool (Russian: В водовороте, romanized: V vodovorote) is a novel by Alexey Pisemsky written in 1870 and first published in Beseda magazine's Nos. 1-6, 1871, issues. While the novel was popular among the readers, initially dismissed by critics of the democratic camp as just another "anti-nihilist novel" (alongside Daniil Mordovtsev's Sign of the Times and Nikolai Bazhin's The History of One Community, both 1869) aimed at discrediting the revolutionary movement, later it came to be recognized as one of Pisemsky's most sophisticated works.

Pisemsky created the image of the protagonist, Elena Zhiglinskaya, following the tradition of the portrayal of nihilists: labor is the only source of her happiness, she is an atheist, and rejects marriage (although she does marry in the end out of the need), etc. However, according to literary critic Natalya Starygina, her soul is not completely lost, because she breaks one important stereotype. In the literary images of nihilist women children were something unimportant and barely mentioned, even if they were part of their lives. Yet Elena of Pisemsky does have maternal feelings and cares for her son.

Lev Tolstoy praised Pisemsky for the compositional excellence of the novel, while Nikolai Leskov considered In the Whirlpool to be the best of Pisemsky's novels to the moment.
