= Vasily Avseenko =

Russian literary critic, writer and journalist

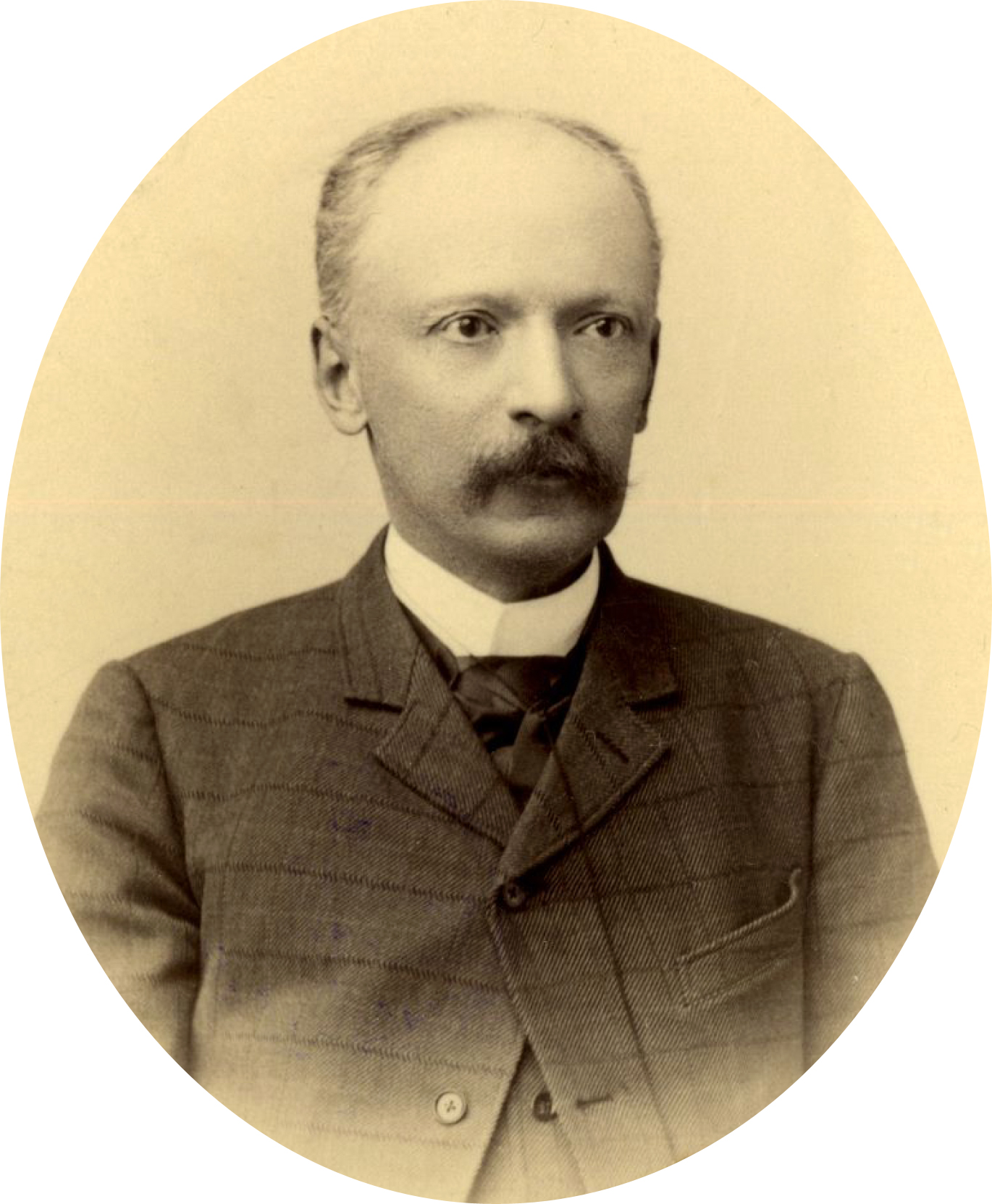
- Photograph by Andrey Denyer
- Born: 17 January 1842; Moscow Governorate, Russian Empire
- Died: 11 August 1913 (aged 71); Saint Petersburg, Russian Empire
- Writing career
- Genres: fiction, criticism

Vasily Grigorievich Avseenko (Russian: Васи́лий Григо́рьевич Авсе́енко, 17 [o.s. 5] January, 1842, Moscow Governorate, - August 11 [o.s.July 29] 1913, Saint Petersburg) was a literary critic, writer and journalist from the Russian Empire.

== Biography ==
Vasily Avseenko was born in 1842 into a wealthy noble family. In 1852 he became a student at the first Saint Petersburg gymnasium. There, influenced by his teacher Vasily Vodovozov and senior students, Vsevolod Krestovsky among them, he started writing poetry. He published only one poem in the 1869 August issue of Modny Magazine, under the pseudonym V. Poroshilov. In 1856 he joined the first Kiev gymnasium and, upon the graduation, enrolled at the St. Vladimir University in Kiev where he studied history. As a student he started publishing articles on the history of Russia and Ukraine in Russkoye Slovo, 1860-1861; Russkaya Retch, 1861; Otechestvennye zapiski, 1863; The Russian Messenger, 1863, and Vestnik Evropy, 1866.

Upon his graduation in 1862 Avseenko remained as a teacher of history. In the 1860s he became an active contributor to the newspaper Kievlyanin, led by Vitaly Shulgin. In a pro-Moscow conservative newspaper which condemned 'progressive' ideas, the Polish movement and Ukrainian nationalism, Avseenko became one of the most prominent voices. His Malorossia in 1767 historical treatise was published as a separate book. In 1869 Avseenko moved to Saint Petersburg to join first the Ministry of Foreign Affairs, then in 1873 the Ministry of Education. Here he became close to the staff of Zarya magazine where he met Dmitry Averkiev, Nikolai Strakhov, Aleksey Pisemsky, and Fyodor Berg.

The leitmotif of Avseenko's articles was his opposition to Westernization and criticism of authors who were "trying to graft sick and foreign European tendencies onto Russian soil." Later he changed his position radically, drifted away from the Slavophile camp and sharply criticized (in an article entitled "The Wondering of Russian Thought") the Strakhov-published compilation of Apollon Grigoriev's articles, where the 'simple man' was declared the bearer of 'true Russian values'.

Avseenko's critical essays were featured in Russkiy Mir (1871-1875, signed A.O.) and The Russian Messenger (1873-1877, signed A). According to his theory, the mission of Russian literature was highlighting the "elemental, natural aspects of common Russia, potentially mighty but still unrealized, passive and restricted by an impassive mode of existence" and supporting the educated elite as the nation's driving force. Such elitism drew much criticism, not only from the revolutionary democratic camp, but also from Turgenev, Strakhov and Dostoyevsky. The latter has been particularly vexed with Avseenko, who dismissed his novels The Raw Youth and Demons as being "the works of a limited talent," given to "digging in dark and musty underground," never touching reality and "exploring intimate depths of human vice." Dostoyevsky retorted with a pamphlet denouncing Avdeenko as someone who was too 'star-struck with high society life' to understand and respect the common people. Dostoyevsky saw the core of Russia's problems in the corrupt influence of the Western civilization, while Avseenko argued it was the lack of culture among Russia's educated classes. For "the fall of culture in society" which he often deplored Avseenko was blaming Saint Petersburg's journalists and radical literature with its "disregard for beauty and gentility" and disgust to what the 'aristocratic' literature had to offer. Avseenko advocated the Pushkin tradition, as opposed to that of Gogol, the latter realized in the works by Alexander Ostrovsky, Nikolai Nekrasov and Vissarion Belinsky.

As a prosaic Avseenko debuted in 1865 with the short story called "The Tempest" (the August issue of The Russian Messenger). Several novels followed in 1870-1880s (The Milky Way, Teeth-gnawing, Evil Spirit) in which he dealt with corruption, injustice and all kinds of social issues. But with thriller elements brought to the fore, a lot af melodrama and sleek, bland language, critics never took those seriously. Saltykov-Schedrin called Avseenko's novels 'dated and moldy', other reviewers noted the author's eagerness to come out as Leo Tolstoy's follower (whose philosophies he criticized). Yet, Avseenko's novels were popular and in retrospect were regarded as curious and valuable pastiches of the end of 19th century life in Russia.

In 1883 Avseenko started editing Sankt-Peterburgskye Vedomosti (Saint Petersburgh News) shifting the magazine towards a moderately conservative mode. In 1886-1890 he was the editor of Russkaya Gazeta (the curtailed, 'cheap' version of the former) and in 1991-1992 the illustrated Khudozhnik (Painter) magazine. According to the theatre critic Alexander Kugel, "he was one of those editors who insisted upon the perfection of form and cultivated the strict discipline of the stylistic work." In the early 1900s Avseenko's fiction was still widely read, critics in general regarded him a 'quality writer' and the 'master of the ordinary', according to Afanasiev brothers' biography.
