= The Comic Actor =

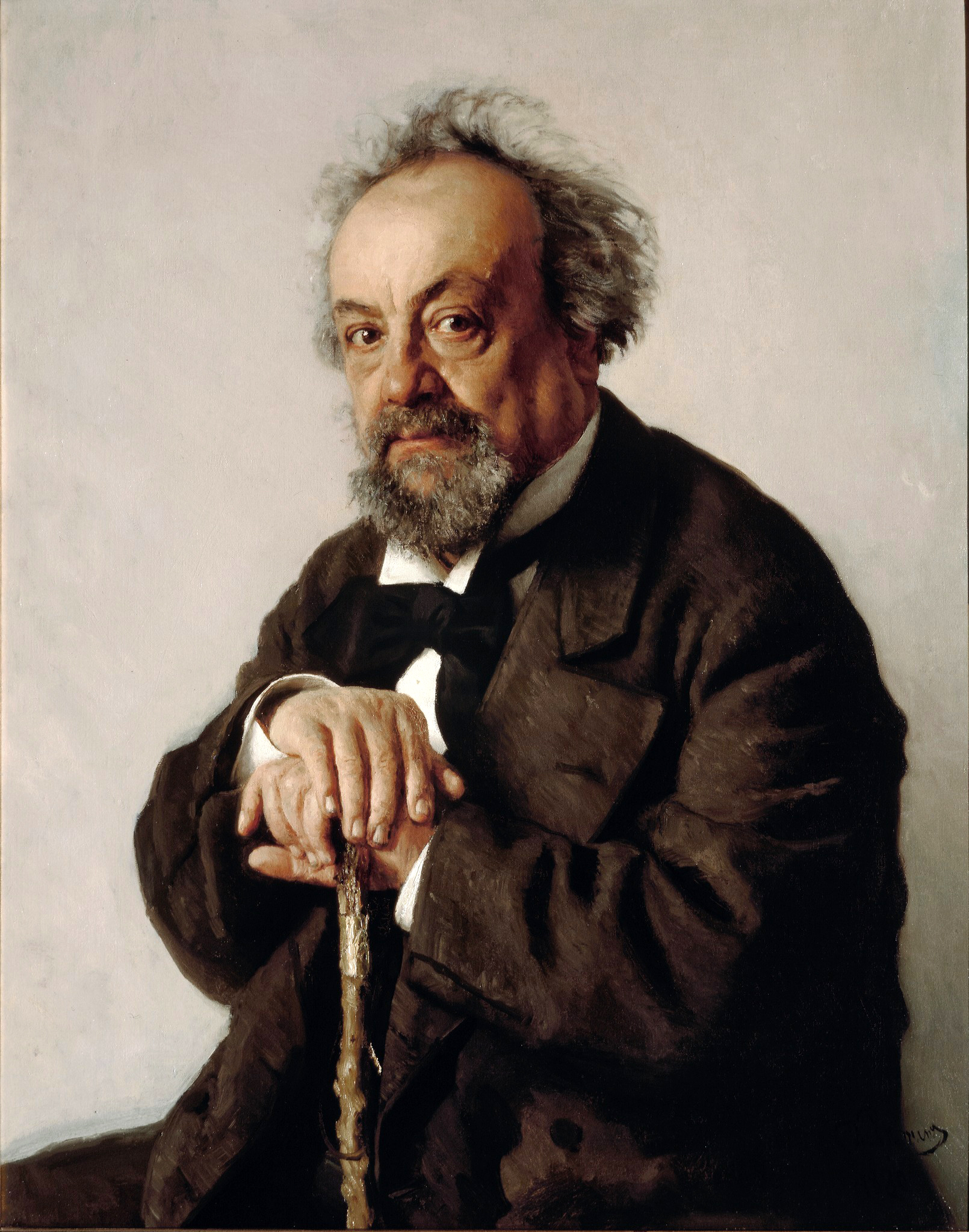
Portrait of Pisemsky by Ilya Repin

The Comic Actor (Russian: Комик) is an 1851 novella by Aleksey Pisemsky. It first appeared in print in the November 1851 (No. 21) issue of Moskvityanin and was later included into the 1861 edition of Works by A.F. Pisemsky, published in St. Petersburg by Fyodor Stellovsky.

== Plot summary ==
The novella centers on an amateur theatrical presentation being given by a wealthy provincial landowner named Apollos Diletaev, and the involvement in this presentation of a gifted comic actor named Rymov. Diletaev convinces Rymov to participate, even though he's personally unpopular in the town due to his alcoholism and poor work record. Rymov is also the only low-born person selected, the rest being members of the wealthy gentry selected by Diletaev.

The rehearsals go well, and Rymov impresses the other actors with his skill in playing comic roles and making the small rehearsal audience laugh. Rymov himself expresses his unwillingness to act with the other performers because of their lack of talent, but Diletaev talks him into it. When the presentation is performed at a local warehouse, Rymov does a great job playing the part of Podkolyosin in Nikolai Gogol's play Marriage. Diletaev decides to organize a prize of money and a fancy crystal bowl for Rymov at a dinner following the presentation. Rymov gets drunk at the dinner and goes on an insulting tangent against his wealthy fellow performers. He finally has to be thrown out of the house, and the novella ends with Rymov being committed to a mental asylum.

== Background ==
The novella echoes Pisemsky's own love of theater and especially of Gogol's dramatic works. Pisemsky himself played the role of Podkolyosin in an 1844 student production of Marriage in Moscow, and claimed that he also performed the part with genius. The other, darker, side of the novella's connection to Pisemsky's life is depicted in Rymov's alcoholism, a disease that Pisemsky also suffered from, beginning in the 1840s.

== Criticism ==
The novella represents a tribute to Gogol, who had a significant influence on Pisemsky, but the work shows less an imitation of Gogol than a similarity of talent.
