= Men Above the Law =

1867 play by Aleksey Pisemsky

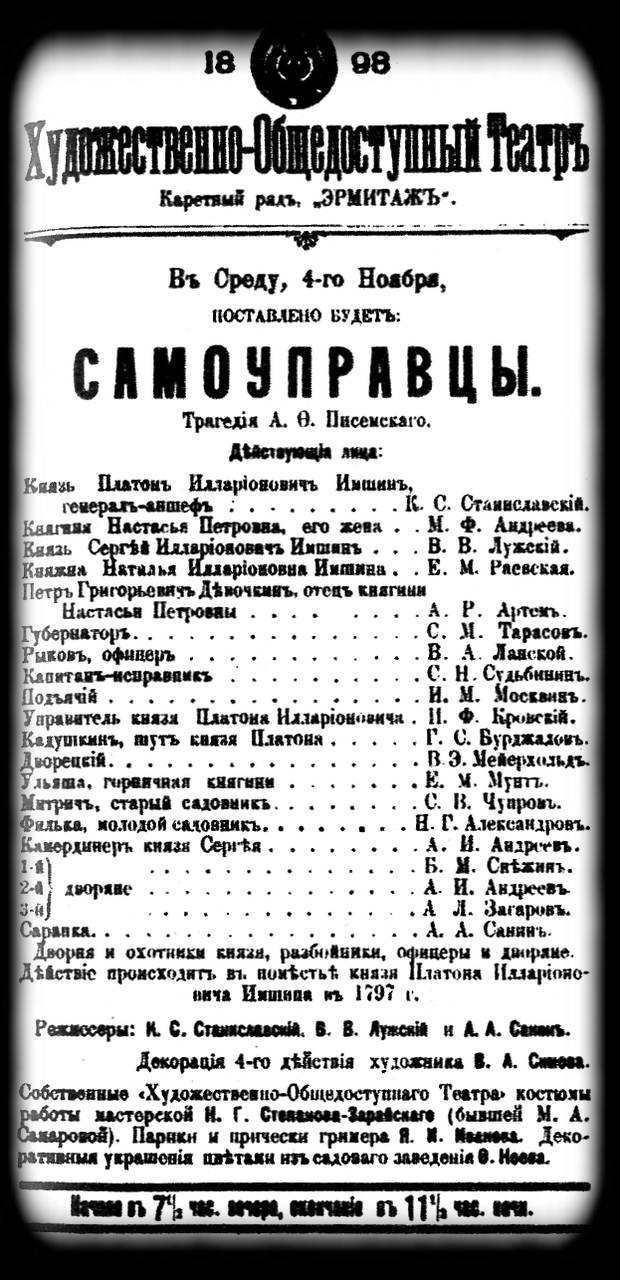
- 1898 poster
- Written by: Aleksey Pisemsky
- Original language: Russian
- Subject: Domestic violence, unlawfulness in Russia in the times of serfdom
- Genre: Tragedy
- Setting: 1797. The estate of Platon Imshin

Premiere
- Date premiered: 17 January 1866
- Place premiered: Maly Theatre (Moscow)

Men Above the Law (Russian: Самоуправцы, romanized: Samoupravtsy) is a tragedy in five acts by Aleksey Pisemsky first published in the No.2, February 1867 issue of Vsemirny Trud magazine.

== History ==
The play was written during the summer and autumn of 1865 and completed on 31 October. Its plotline was based upon the real story of a sadist landowner N.F. Katenin who in the mid-1790s in the basements of his Zanino estate in Kostroma Governorate habitually tortured peasants.

In November, Pisemsky started the procedures necessary for the play to be produced on stage, giving it the provisional title The Yekayerinisk Eagles (Екатерининские орлы). The censorship committee's permission was received in the early 1866, but only after the author agreed to remove several scenes which were deemed exceedingly violent.

In late 1865, Pisemsky nominated the play for that year's Uvarov Prize. Among the playwrights taking part in the competition were Alexander Ostrovsky (with Voyevoda or the Volga Dream) and Alexey K. Tolstoy (The Death of Ivan the Terrible). In the end it was decided that the Prize that year should not be awarded at all.

The academician Alexander Nikitenko who reviewed the play for the Uvarov Prize committee left a negative response. "The play is depressing, and leaves one with a heavy heart... burdened with outrages, which the author never even tries to alleviate with an attempt to provide reason or rational understanding of [all these horrors]," he wrote.

== Characters ==
All the descriptions of the characters provided by Pisemsky himself

- Prince Platon Illarionovich Imshin, army general, speaks and understands the French poorly; is much better read in the Holy Scripture
- Princess Nastassya Petrovna Imshina, his wife, young and beautiful, but poorly educated
- Prince Sergey Illarionovich Imshin, Embassy councillor; does all the thinking in French, only when speaking to the Russians does he translate his thoughts into their native language
- Princess Natalya Illarionovna Imshina, former lady-in-waiting at the Court, now an old provincial barynya, uses perfume and cosmetics excessively
- Pyotr Grigoryevich Devochkin, Nastassya Petrovna's father, a retired praporshchik, in stature reminds Suvorov, is always in a fighting mood and never sobers throughout the day. Somebody an of whom one'd say: "What hell of a man!"
- The Governor, tall a thoughtful man with a long nose
- Rykov, young Gatchina officer
- Police captain, ruddy-faced man dressed as a retired army officer
- Podyachy, like any other of your podyachys
- Prince Platon's estate manager, in his German suit, a kaftan, and tricorne looks like German pastor
- Kadushkin, the Fool who hates to be called 'lamb'
- The Butler, Ulyasha the maid, a midget woman
- Mitrich, old gardener, a clever man but talks a lot of nonsense and is prone to bragging
- Filka, young gardener, an industrious guy, likes to pretend he thinks a lot, but is in fact quite foreign to the process
- Sarapka, hunchback, a severely twisted and very angry man
- The bartender, the waiter and the hunters

Set in 1797, at the estate of Platon Illarionovich Imshin

== Plot summary ==
The elderly Prince Platon Imshin, tormented by jealousy, finds out about his young wife Nastassya's unfaithfulness. In a fit of righteous rage he imprisons her in a sepulcher, throws her lover, the Army officer Rykov into a basement and apportions some more 'vengeful' deeds along the way, which also includes injuring his brother Sergey in a duel (for having made passes for the young Princess, too). The ever drunk Nastassya's dad arrives with a gang of local bandits. Equally full of righteousness, he frees his daughter along with other captives, and brings havoc to (now also injured) Prince Platon's estate, burning half of it down. Finally, a local Governor, a sad and gentle man arrives with a small army unit to bring peace and order. In a bizarre 'happy-ending' the dying Prince Platon pardons everybody, blesses his (soon to be) widow to marry her lover (whom he now greatly admires for having fought the Devochkin's louts heroically); everybody's in tears of compunction, gratitude and joy.

== Production history ==
Men Above the Law premiered at the Moscow Maly Theatre on 17 January 1866 to great public and critical acclaim. Equally successful it was in Saint Petersburg, produced on stage the Alexandrinsky Theatre.

The greatest success though enjoyed the 1898 Moscow Art Theatre production. The cast there included Konstantin Stanislavsky as Prince Platon Imshin, Maria Andreyeva as Nastassya Pterovna, Alexander Artyom as Devochkin, Ivan Moskvin as Podyachy, Serafim Sudbinin as police captain, Vsevolod Meyerhold as the butler, Vasily Luzhsky as Sergey Imshin.
