= The Hypochondriac (play) =

Comedy play by Alexey Pisemsky

- Author: Aleksey Pisemsky
- Original title: Ипохондрик
- Language: Russian
- Genre: comedy
- Publisher: Moskvityanin
- Publication date: 1851
- Publication place: Russian Empire
- Media type: Print (hardback & paperback)
- Followed by: The Allotment (1852)

The Hypochondriac (Russian: Иппохондрик, romanized: Ippokhondrik) is a four-act comedy by Alexey Pisemsky first published in Moskvityanin's No. 1, 1851 issue. Stopped by censors in 1852, it premiered on 21 September 1855 in Saint Petersburg's Alexandrinsky Theatre.

== History ==
As the play was rejected by censors in 1852, Pisemsky embarked upon re-writing it, following Mikhail Pogodin's advice. In a letter to Pogodin he wrote:

...I thank you greatly for the troubles you've taken concerning my Hypochondriac. Following your advice I started a re-write, but found myself at a loss as to what exactly is here to be changed. You told me to try and appease my critics, but those were few. For example, Sovremennik said that the comedy's plot lacked the starting point. This may be true, but to do something about it is now impossible. Biblioteka Dlya Chtenya heaped a pile of rubbish. Otechestvennye Zapiski sported some jaundice, but nothing apart from that. I doubt that from all this one could pick a single advise to follow. There's just one thing: for me [the play] looks a bit too long and so I am going to make some cuts.

=== Productions ===
In 1855, after prolonged negotiations, the permission for the comedy to be produced on stage at the Imperial Theatres was received. It premiered on 21 September 1855 in Saint Petersburg's Alexandrinsky Theatre and had a run of six performances. Reviews were mixed and occasionally contained self-contradictory statements. Biblioteka Dlya Chtenya called it "excellent... highly intelligent comedy," even if "overblown" and sporting a hero that was "unspeakably dull". Sovremennik (in an anonymous review the authorship of which was later ascribed to Nikolai Nekrasov) opined that the production was a success although the play itself "lacked even a modicum of thought".

In 1857 the play was staged at the Moscow's Maly Theatre. The Theatre and Music Herald (Teatralny i muzykalny vestnik) called it "dry and somewhat dreary," but credited the actors involved (among them Prov Sadovsky and Nadezhda Rykalova) with saving it by providing "most expressive performances."
