= Lev Anninsky =

Soviet Russian literary critic (1934–2019)

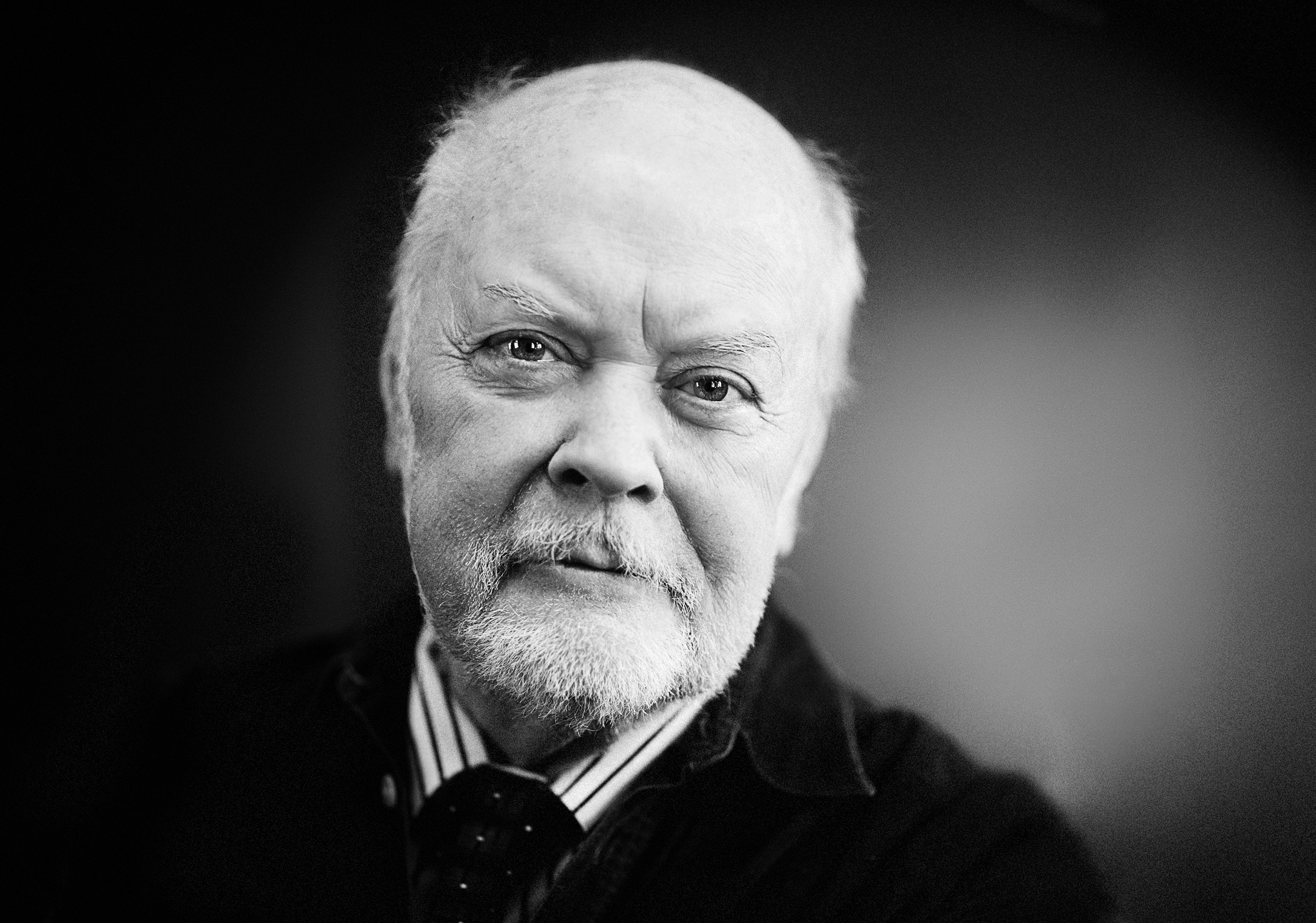
- Lev Anninsky in 2015
- Born: Lev Alexandrovich Anninsky; 7 April 1934; Rostov-on-Don, USSR
- Died: 6 November 2019 (aged 85); Moscow, Russia

Lev Alexandrovich Anninsky (Russian: Лев Александрович Аннинский, 7 April 1934 – 6 November 2019) was a Soviet and Russian literary critic, historian, publicist, essayist and author of more than 30 books. He was also a scriptwriter, and as such the three times TEFI laureate (1996 and 2004, twice).

== Biography ==
Anninsky was born in Rostov-on-Don, to Alexander Anninsky, a cossack from stanitsa Novo-Anninskaya, and Anna (Khana Zalmanovna) Alexandrova, born in Lyubech, Ukraine. His grandmother Bronislava Gershenovich was murdered in 1921 on a country road by members of the Chernigov-based Ivan Galaka's gang, for being Jewish. In his early years he read a lot, mostly Russian classics and history books, but also philosophers like Hegel and Kant. In 1939, as a five-year-old, he appeared on screen, cast as a kindergarten boy in the film The Foundling (Подкидыш). Anninsky's father, originally a school teacher, later a Mosfilm producer, 1941 went to War and was gone missing. As Anninsky learned years later, he got injured during the German aviation raid in mid-1942 near Polotsk, was captured and was later shot dead by the Ukrainian polizei. Anninsky's mother taught chemistry in a technical college for the rest of her life.

In 1956, still a student at the Moscow University philological faculty, Anninsky debuted as a literary critic with the analysis of Vladimir Dudintsev's novel Not by Bread Alone. After the graduation he was about to join the post-graduate courses, but this coincided with the events in Hungary. Since the uprising there has been instigated by this country's literary elite, the CPSU decided to "brush the ideology up" in the Soviet academic circles and Anninsky found out that to re-join the university he'll have to do some practical work first. He spent half a year in the Sovetsky Soyuz magazine, got fired, joined the Literaturnaya Gazeta (1957-1960), then Znamya magazine (1960-1967). In 1965 The Nut's Core, his first major collection of critical essays came out.

Upon signing a letter supporting the dissident Andrey Sinyavsky, his former university tutor, he was evicted from Znamya. In 1968-1972 Anninsky worked in the Institute of Sociological research at the Academy of Science, then joined Druzhba Narodov magazine (1972-1991), starting a career of a freelancer which brought him the reputation of an insightful and original author whose essays were welcomed both in Oktyabr and Novy mir, the two magazines belonging to the competing ('patriots'/'liberals') factions. Anninsky has never joined the Soviet Communist Party.

The 1970s saw the publication of several books by Anninsky, among them Betrothed to the Idea (on Nikolai Ostrovsky’s How the Steel Was Tempered, 1971) and Vasily Shukshin (1976). Anninsky's books of the 1980s included The Leo Hunters (Lev Tolstoy in cinema), 1980, 1989; Leskovian Necklace (1982, 1885), Contacts (1982), Branches Full of Sunlight (a study on Lithuanian photography, 1984), Nikolai Gubenko (1986) and The Three Heretics (1988), a trilogy on the mavericks of 19th-century Russian literature: Pisemsky, Melnikov-Pechersky and Leskov.

In 1990-1992, Anninsky worked in Literaturnoye obozrenye (The Literature Review), then joined the newly formed Rodina magazine and in 1998 became the editor of the short-lived Vremya i my (Time And Us) project. Among his works of the time were The Flying Curtain (Essays on Georgian literature, 1990), Men of the Sixties and Our Times (subtitled: "The Cinema that Made History and the One that Never Did," 1991), The Bards (1999). His 1997 book The Silver and the Black (subtitled: "The Russian, the Soviet, the Slavic and the Worldly in the Silver Age poetry"), on the 12 poets of the early 20th century, formed the basis for the TV documentary series of the same title. Directed by Vitaly Maksimov and premiered on Kultura TV in 2004, it earned Anninsky two TEFIs (in "The Best Script" and "The Best TV Documentary" categories). In 2010, Lev Anninsky received the "White Elephant" (Слон), the Russian Guild of Film Critics' award. Since 2003, Anninsky had been a member of the Yasnaya Polyana Literary Award jury.

Anninsky died on 6 November 2019.
