= Aleksey Pisemsky =

Russian novelist and dramatist (1821–1881)

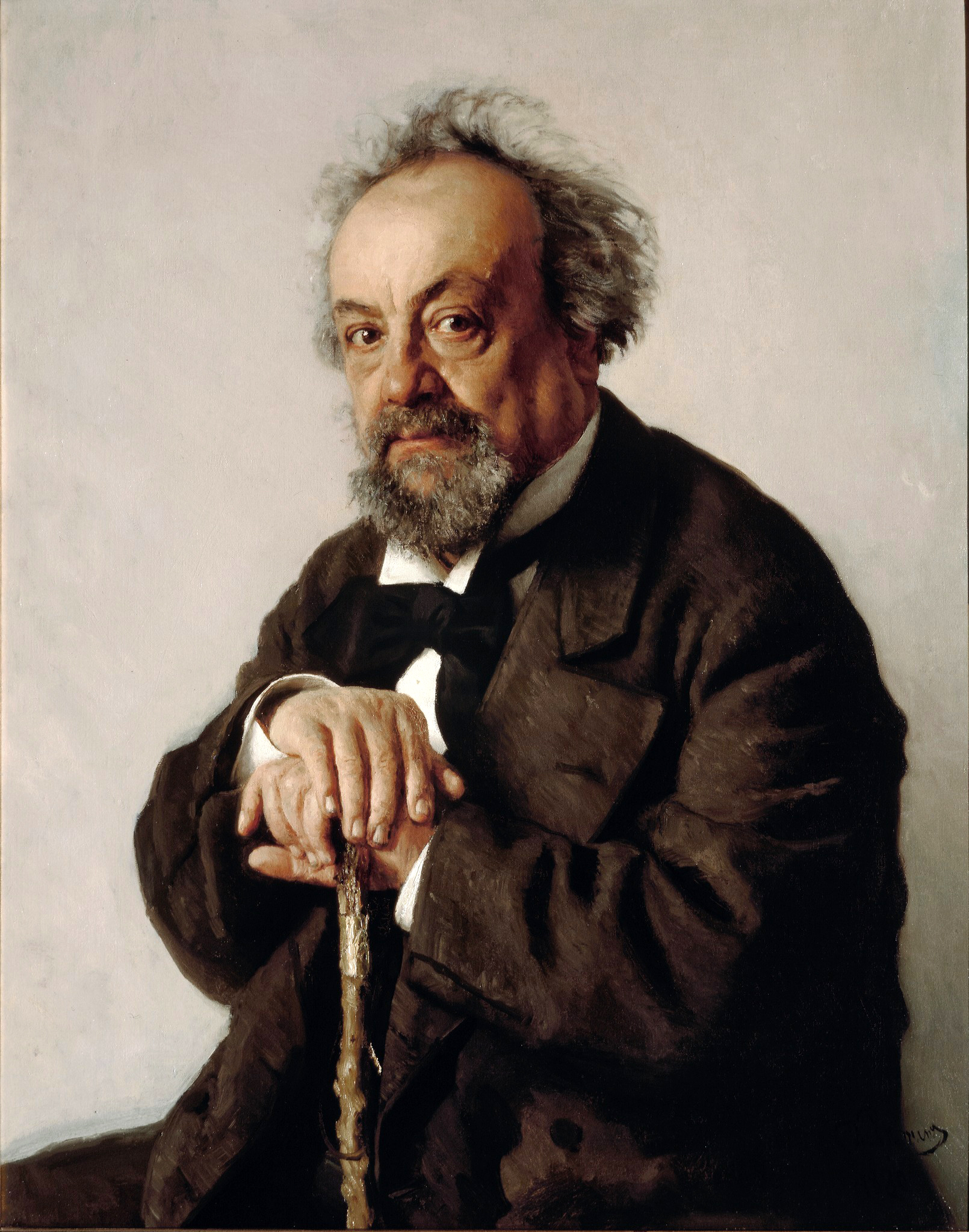
- Portrait of Pisemsky by Ilya Repin
- Born: 23 March 1821; Kostroma Governorate, Russian Empire
- Died: 2 February 1881 (aged 59); Moscow, Russian Empire
- Occupation: Writer • Chief editor
- Spouse: Yekaterina Pavlovna Svinyina
- Children: 2
- Writing career
- Genres: Novel, short story, play
- Notable works: One Thousand Souls (1858); A Bitter Fate (1859); An Old Man's Sin (1862); Troubled Seas (1863)
- Notable awards: Uvarov Prize of the Russian Academy
- Movements: Realism, natural school

Signature
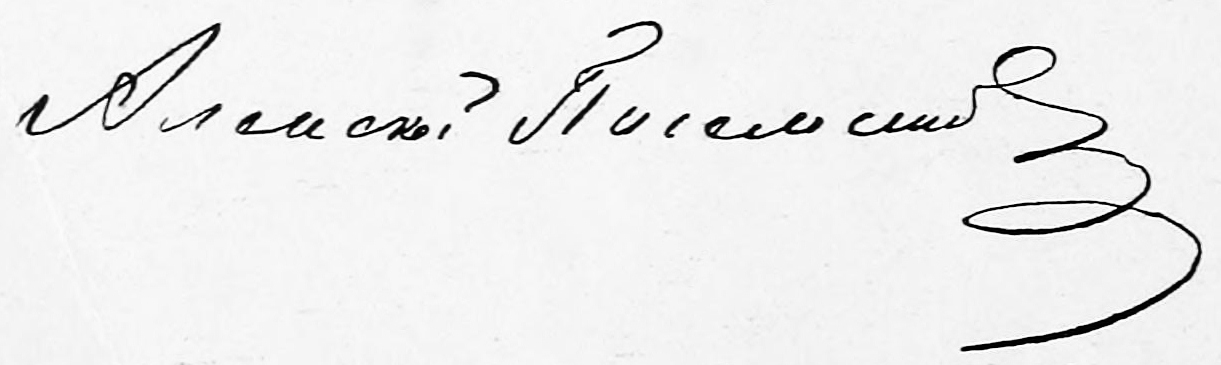

Aleksey Feofilaktovich Pisemsky (Russian: Алексе́й Феофила́ктович Пи́семский) (23 March [O.S. 11 March] 1821 – 2 February [O.S. 21 January] 1881) was a Russian novelist and dramatist who was regarded as an equal of Ivan Turgenev and Fyodor Dostoyevsky in the late 1850s, but whose reputation suffered a spectacular decline after his fall-out with Sovremennik magazine in the early 1860s. A realistic playwright, along with Aleksandr Ostrovsky he was responsible for the first dramatization of ordinary people in the history of Russian theatre. "Pisemsky's great narrative gift and exceptionally strong grip on reality make him one of the best Russian novelists" according to D.S. Mirsky.

Pisemsky's first novel Boyarschina (1847, published 1858) was originally forbidden for its unflattering description of the Russian nobility. His principal novels are The Simpleton (1850), One Thousand Souls (1858), which is considered his best work of the kind, and Troubled Seas, which gives a picture of the excited state of Russian society around the year 1862. He also wrote plays, including A Bitter Fate (1859; also translated as "A Hard Lot"), which depicts the dark side of the Russian peasantry. The play has been called the first Russian realistic tragedy; it won the Uvarov Prize of the Russian Academy.

== Biography ==
=== Early life ===
Aleksey Pisemsky was born at his father's Ramenye estate in the Chukhloma province of Kostroma. His parents were retired colonel Feofilakt Gavrilovich Pisemsky and his wife Yevdokiya Shipova. In his autobiography, Pisemsky described his family as belonging to the ancient Russian nobility, although his more immediate progenitors were all very poor and unable to read or write:

I come from an ancient noble family. One of my ancestors, a diak named Pisemsky, had been sent by Tsar Ivan the Terrible to London with a view of coming to an understanding with Princess Elisabeth whose niece the Tsar was planning to marry. Another predecessor of mine, Makary Pisemsky, became a monk and has been canonized as a saint, his remains still lying at rest in the Makarievsky monastery on the Unzha River. That's about all there is to my family's historical glory... The Pisemskys, from what I've heard of them, were rich, but the particular branch that I belong to has become desolate. My grandfather was illiterate, walked in lapti, and ploughed the land himself. One of his affluent relatives, a landowner from Malorossia, took it upon himself to "arrange the future" of Feofilakt Gavrilovich Pisemsky, my father, then fourteen. This "arranging" process was reduced to the following: my father was washed up, given some clothes, taught to read, and then sent as a soldier to conquer Crimea. After having spent 30 years in the regular army there, he, now an army Major, took an opportunity to re-visit Kostroma Province... and there married my mother, who came from the wealthy Shipov family. My father was 45 at the time, my mother 37.

Aleksey remained the only child in the family, four infants dying before his birth and five after. Years later he described himself (to which other people attested) as a weak, capricious and whimsical boy who for some reason loved to mock clergymen and suffered from sleepwalking at one time. Pisemsky remembered his father as a military service man in every sense of the word, strict and duty-bound, a man of honesty in terms of money, severe and strict. "Some of our serfs were horrified by him, not all of them, though, only those who were foolish and lazy; those who were smart and industrious were favoured by him," he remarked.

Pisemsky remembered his mother a nervous, dreamy, astute, eloquent (even if not well educated) and rather sociable woman. "Except for those clever eyes of hers, she wasn't good-looking, and once, when I was a student, my father asked me: 'Tell me Aleksey, why do you think your mother becomes more attractive with age?' – 'Because she has a lot of inner beauty which, as years go by, becomes more and more evident', I answered, and he had to agree with me," Pisemsky later wrote. His mother's cousins were Yury Bartenev, one of the most prominent Russian Freemasons (colonel Marfin in the novel Masons) and Vsevolod Bartenev (Esper Ivanovich in People of the Forties), a Navy officer; both exerted considerable influence upon the boy.

Pisemsky spent the first ten years of his life in the small regional town of Vetluga where his father served as Mayor. Later he moved with his parents to the countryside. Pisemsky described the years he spent there in Chapter 2 of People of the Forties, an autobiographical novel in which he figured under the name of Pasha. Fond of hunting and horseback riding, the boy received scant education: his tutors were a local deacon, a defrocked drunkard, and a strange old man who was known to have toured the area for decades, giving lessons. Aleksey learned reading, writing, arithmetics, Russian and Latin from them. In his autobiography Pisemsky wrote: "Nobody had ever forced me to learn, and I wasn't an avid learner, but I read a lot and that was my passion: by 14 I consumed, in translation, of course, most of Walter Scott's novels, Don Quixote, Gil Blas, Faublas, Le Diable boiteux, The Serapion Brethren, a Persian novel called Hajji Baba... As for children's books, I couldn't stand them and, as far as I remember now, considering them very silly." Pisemsky wrote scornfully of his primary education and regretted failing to learn any languages besides Latin. He found in himself, however, a natural predisposition to mathematics, logic and aesthetics.

==== Formal education ====
In 1834, at the age of 14, Alexey's father took him to Kostroma, to enroll him in the local gymnasium. Memories of his school life found their way into the short story "The Old Man" and the novel Men of the Forties. "I started well, was perceptive and hard-working, but gained most of my popularity as an amateur actor," he later remembered. Inspired by The Dnieper Mermaid (an opera by Ferdinand Kauer), performed by a wandering troupe of actors, Pisemsky, along with his roommate, organized a home theater and had great success with his first role, that of Prudius in The Cossack Poet by Prince Alexander Shakhovskoy. This first triumph had a dramatic effect upon the boy who adopted what he called an "aesthetic way of life", much under the influence of Vsevolod Nikitovich Bartenev, his uncle. Bartenev supplied his nephew with the newest novels and journals and prompted him to begin studying music and playing the piano, which the boy did, according to one of his friends, "with the expressiveness yet unheard of".

It was while in school that Pisemsky started writing. "My 5th form teacher of literature credited me with having talent; in the 6th form I wrote a novella called The Circassian Girl, and in the 7th a still longer one entitled The Iron Ring, both worthy of mention, apparently, only as stylistic exercises, dealing as they did with things I was totally ignorant of at the time," Pisemsky remembered. He sent The Iron Ring (a novel telling of his first romantic passion) to several Saint Petersburg journals and met with all-round rejection. Several months later, already a university student, he gave the novel to Stepan Shevyryov. The professor's reaction was negative and he made a point to discourage the young man from writing about things he knew nothing about.

In 1840, upon graduation from the gymnasium, Pisemsky joined the Faculty of Mathematics at Moscow State University, having overcome resistance from his father who insisted upon his son enrolling in the Demidov Lyceum, for it was closer to home and his education there would have been free. Pisemsky later regarded his choice of faculty as a very fortunate one, even while admitting he drew little practical value out of university lectures. Attending assorted lectures by professors from other faculties, he became acquainted with Shakespeare, Schiller, Goethe, Corneille, Racine, Rousseau, Voltaire, Hugo and George Sand and started to form an educated view on the history of Russian literature. Contemporaries pointed at Pisemsky's two major influences of the time: Belinsky and Gogol. Besides, as Pisemsky's friend Boris Almazov remembered, Pavel Katenin, the follower of French classicism and Russian translator of Racine and Cornel, whom Pisemsky knew through being a neighbour, exerted some influence upon him as well. According to Almazov, Pisemsky had a considerable dramatic talent, and it was Katenin who helped him to develop it.

===== Acting =====
By 1844 Pisemsky was known as a gifted reciter, his repertoire consisting mostly of works by Gogol. According to Almazov, his solo concerts in his flat on Dolgoruky Lane were immensely popular among both students and visiting schoolboys. A real hit was Pisemsky's performance as Podkolyosin in Gogol's Marriage featured by one of Moscow's small private theaters. "Those were the times when Podkolyosin was being portrayed by our great comedian Schepkin, the Imperial Theatre star. Some of those who saw Pisemsky's performance were of the opinion that he presented this character better than Schepkin did," wrote Almazov. Having earned a word-of-mouth reputation as a master of recitals, Pisemsky started to get invitations to perform all over Saint Petersburg and its provinces.

Pavel Annenkov later remembered: "He performed his own works masterfully, and was able to find exceptionally expressive intonations for every character he was bringing to the stage, which gave a strong effect in his dramatic plays. Equally brilliant was Pisemsky's rendering of his collection of anecdotes concerning his earlier life experiences. He had loads of such anecdotes and each contained a more or less complete character type. Many found their way into his books in a revised form."

=== State official career ===
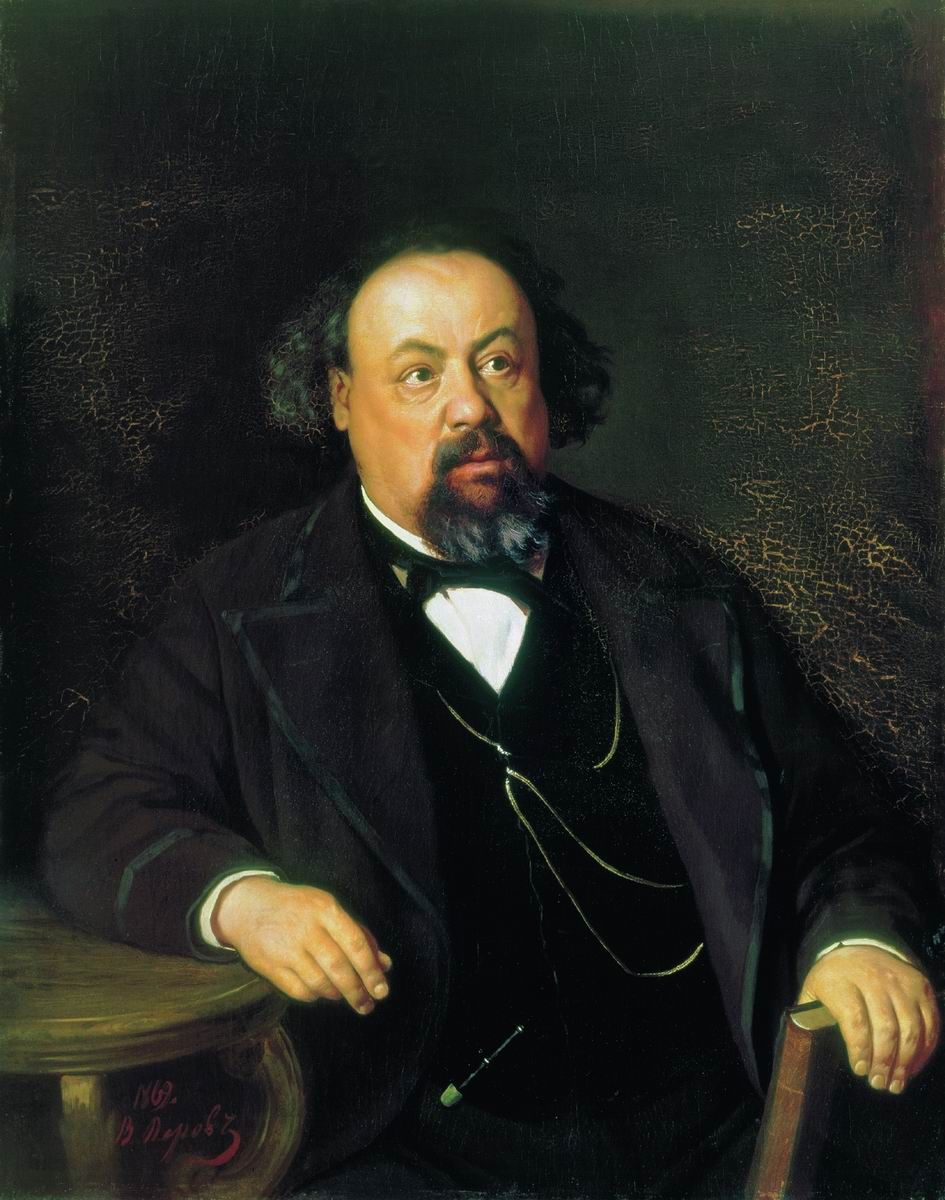
Portrait of Pisemsky by Vasily Perov, 1869

After graduating from the university in 1844, Pisemsky joined the Office of State Properties in Kostroma and was soon transferred to the corresponding department in Moscow. In 1846 he retired and spent two years living in Moscow Province. In 1848 he married Ekaterina, Pavel Svinyin's daughter, and returned to the state office, again in Kostroma, as a special envoy for Prince Suvorov, then the Kostroma governor. After a stint as an assessor in the local government (1849–1853) Pisemsky joined the Ministry of Imperial Lands in Saint Petersburg where he stayed until 1859. In 1866 he joined the Moscow government as a councilor, soon becoming Chief councilor. He finally quit the civil service (as Court Councilor) in 1872. Pisemsky's state official career in the provinces had a profound effect upon him and his major works.

Later Boris Almazov made an important observation in a commemorative speech: "Most of our writers who describe the lives of Russian state officials and people from governmental spheres have only fleeting experiences of this kind... More often than not they've served only formally, hardly noticing the faces of their chiefs, let alone those of their colleagues. Pisemsky treated working for the State differently. He gave himself to serving the Russian state wholeheartedly and, whatever post he occupied, had one single objective in mind: fighting the dark forces which our government and the best part of our society try to fight..." This, according to the speaker, enabled the author not only to fathom the depths of Russian life but to delve down "to the very core of the Russian soul."

Biographer and critic Alexander Skabichevsky found some similarities in the development of Pisemsky and Saltykov-Schedrin, another author who examined the provincial bureaucracy in the times of "total corruption, embezzlement, no laws for landowners, wild atrocities, and a total lack of real state power"; times when "provincial life was mostly uncultured and lacked even basic morality," and "the life of the intelligent classes had the character of one wanton, never ending orgy." Both writers, according to the biographer, "have lost all motivation not just for the idealization of Russian life, but also of highlighting its lighter, positive sides". Yet, while Saltykov-Schedrin, a forward-looking stalwart of the Saint Petersburg circles, had every opportunity to be imbued with the high ideals which were making their way into Russian cities from Europe, and to make these ideals the foundation to build his outward negativity upon, Pisemsky, once he found himself in the Russian provinces, became disillusioned in whatever ideas he had gotten at the university, seeing them as idealistic with no roots in Russian reality, Skabichevsky noted. The biographer wrote:

Following Gogol, Pisemsky depicted [provincial Russia] as being exactly as ugly as he saw it, seeing everywhere around him the most rigid resistance to those new ideals he'd pick up at the University, realizing how incongruous those ideals were with reality... and becoming greatly skeptical towards those ideals as such. The idea of implementing them in such places now looked like an absurdity to him... Thus, adopting a 'rejection for rejection's sake' attitude, he entered tunnels of utter pessimism without any light at the end of them, with pictures of outrage, dirt and amorality working to convince the reader: no other, better life here would be possible anyway, for man – a scoundrel by nature, worshipping only the needs of his own flesh – is always ready to betray all things sacred for his egotistic schemes and lowly instincts.

=== Literary career ===
Pisemsky's early works exhibited profound disbelief in the higher qualities of humanity, and a disdain for the opposite sex. Reflecting upon possible reasons for this, Skabichevsky pointed at those first years spent in Kostroma when the young Pisemsky had lost sight of whatever lofty ideals he might have been exposed to while studying in the capital. "With my [stage] success as Podkolesin my scientific and aesthetic life ended. What lie ahead was only grief and the need to find work. My father was dead already, my mother, shocked by his death, was paralyzed and lost her speech, my means were meagre. With this in mind I returned to the country and gave myself to melancholy and hypochondria," Pisemsky wrote in his autobiography. On the other hand, it was his continuous official errand trips throughout the Kostroma governorate that provided Pisemsky with the priceless material he used in his future literary work.

His first novella Is She to Blame? Pisemsky wrote while still a university student. He gave it to professor Stepan Shevyryov and the latter, being an opponent of the "natural school", recommended to the author "to soften up everything and make it more gentlemanly." Pisemsky agreed to do so, but didn't hurry to follow this advice. What he did instead was send the professor Nina, a naive story about a fresh-looking, beautiful girl who turns into a dull matron. Shevyryov made some editorial cuts and then published the story in the July 1848 issue of the Syn Otechestva magazine. So curtailed and disfigured was this version, that the author never even thought of re-issuing it. The story made its way into the posthumous Wolf's Publishing House 1884 collection of Pisemsky's works (Volume 4). Even in this curtailed form it bore, according to Skabichevsky, every mark of misanthropy and pessimism, seeds of which were sown in Boyarschina.

Pisemsky's first novel Boyarschina was written in 1845. Sent to Otechestvennye Zapiski in 1847, it was banned by the censors – allegedly for "promoting the idea of 'George Sandean' [free] love." When finally published in 1858, the novel failed to make any impact. Still, according to biographer A. Gornfeld, it featured all the elements of Pisemsky's style: expressive naturalism, vitality, many comical details, the lack of positivity and powerful language.

==== Moskvityanin ====
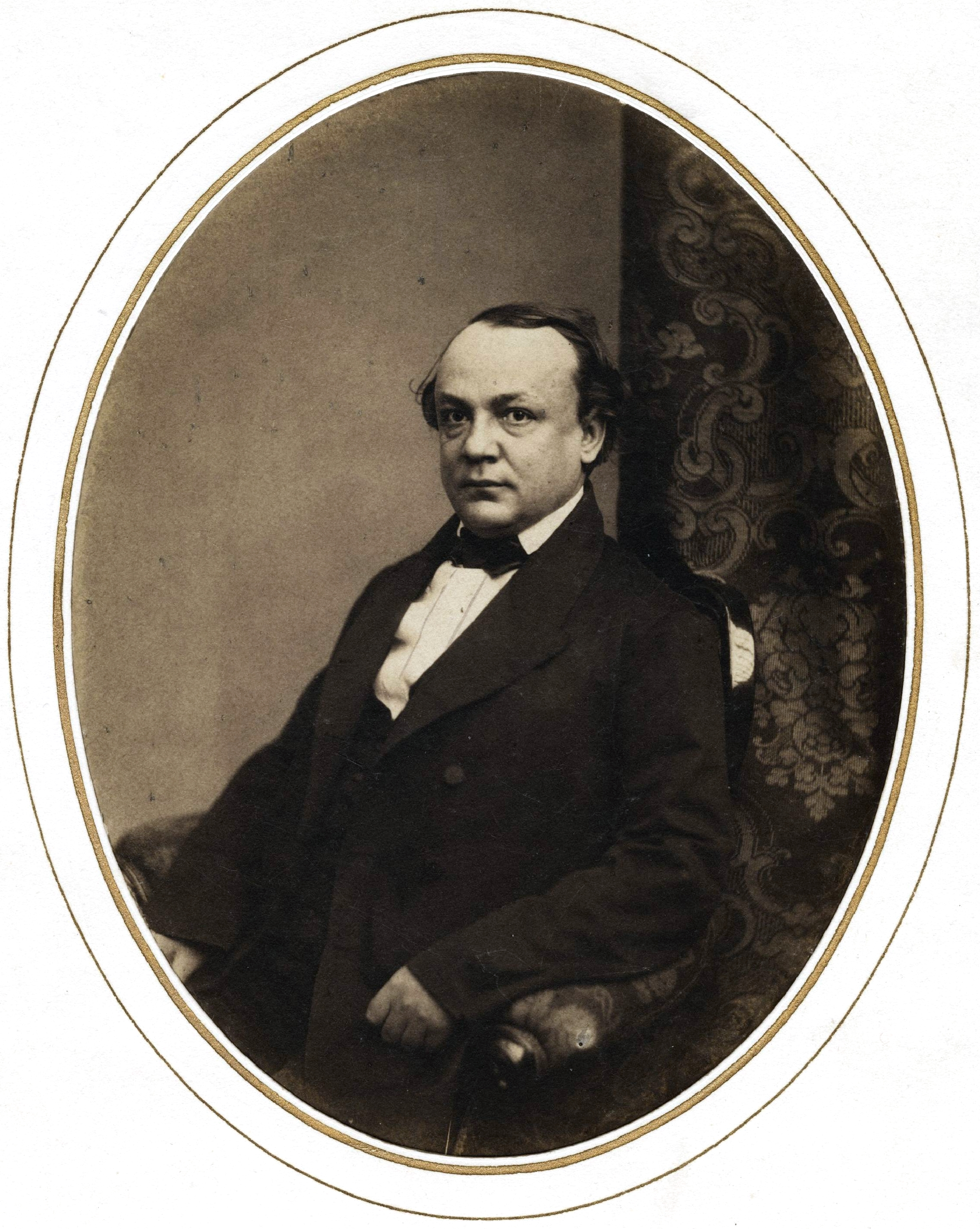
Portrait of Pisemsky by Sergei Levitsky, 1856.

In the early 1840s the Russian Slavophile movement divided into two branches. The old school followers led by the brothers Aksakov, Ivan Kireyevsky and Aleksey Khomyakov, grouped first around Moskovsky Sbornik, then Russkaya Beseda. Mikhail Pogodin's Moskvityanin became the center of the younger Slavophiles who were later labeled potchvenniky ('the soil-bound'), Apollon Grigoriev, Boris Almazov, and Alexander Ostrovsky among them. In 1850 Moskvityanin invited Pisemsky to join in and the latter promptly sent Ostrovsky his second novel The Simpleton he'd been working on throughout 1848. In November of that year the story of a young idealist who dies after his illusions have been destroyed, was published in Moskvityanin, to a critical and public acclaim. A year later Marriage of Passion (Брак по страсти) appeared in the same magazine, again praised by the reviewers. Now raised to the ranks of "the best writers of our times", Pisemsky found his works compared to those of Ivan Turgenev, Ivan Goncharov and Alexander Ostrovsky. Pavel Annenkov remembered:

I recall the impression Pisemsky's first two novels made upon me... How hilarious they seemed, what an abundance of comic situations there were and how the author made these characters funny without trying to impose any moral judgement upon them. The Russian provincial philistine community was shown at its most self-celebrational, it was brought under the light and made to look almost proud of its own wildness, its unique outrageousness. The comical nature of these sketches had nothing to do with the author's juxtaposing them with one kind of doctrine or another. The effect was achieved by showing the complacency with which all those ridiculous characters were leading their lives full of absurdity and moral looseness. The laughter that Pisemsky's stories provoked was different from that of Gogol, although, as it follows from our author's autobiography, his initial efforts reflected much of Gogol and his work. Pisemsky's laughter stripped its subject down to the vulgar core, and to expect anything like "hidden tears" in it would be impossible. His was the joviality of, as it were, physiological nature, which is extremely rare with modern writers and more typical to the ancient Roman comedy, Middle Age farce or our common man's re-telling of some low-brow joke."

Pisemsky's debut play The Hypochondriac (1852) was followed by the Sketches of Peasant life, a three-part short stories cycle. In Pisemsky's second play, The Divide (Раздел, 1853), a typical natural school piece, parallels have been found with Turgenev's comedy Breakfast at the Chief's. Speaking about Pisemsky's early works, Skabichevsky wrote: "Dig deeper into the pessimism which has gone into full swing in The Muff and Marriage by Passion, put it next to the mindset of an ordinary provincial man for examination and you'll be struck by the identical nature of the two. At the bottom of this outlook lies the conviction that man deep in his soul is a scoundrel, moved only by practical interests and egotistical, mostly dirty impulses, and for this reason one has to be on one's guard with one's neighbour and always keep 'a stone by one's bosom'."

Influenced for many years by this provincial philosophy, Pisemsky to a large extent made it his own, according to the biographer. "Long before Troubled Seas, people of high education, embracing progressive ideas and a new outlook were being shown invariably as outrageous, vulgar rogues, worse than even the ugliest freaks of the uneducated community," Skabichevsky argued.

According to Annenkov, some of the 'thinking men of the time' simply refused to put up with this peculiar kind of "delight, drawn from the naked comic nature of situations," seeing this as akin to "the rapture a street mob enjoys when shown a hunch-backed Petrushka or other physical deformities." Annenkov quoted Vasily Botkin, a "terse and far-seeing critic" as saying that he "could not sympathize with the author who, although unquestionably gifted, apparently has neither principles of his own nor ideas to base his stories upon."

==== Sovremennik ====
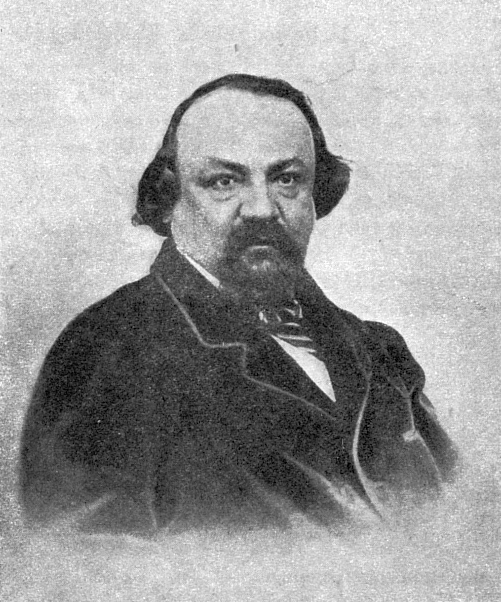
Pisemsky in 1860s

Encouraged by his early success, Pisemsky became very active and in 1850–1854 several of his novels, novellas, comedies, and sketches appeared in different journals, among them The Comic Actor, The Petersburg Man and Mr. Batmanov. In 1854 Pisemsky decided to leave his post as a local government assessor in Kostroma and moved to Saint Petersburg where he made quite an impression upon the literary community with his provincial originality, but also some ideas which the Russian capital's cultural elite found shocking. He had no time for the idea of women's emancipation and confessed to experiencing a "kind of organic revolt" towards all foreigners which he couldn't overcome by any means." The notion of human development in general was totally foreign to him, according to Skabichevsky. Some saw all this as affectation, but, the biographer wrote, "dig deeper into the well of Pisemsky's most outrageous opinions and ideas and you'll discover bits and pieces of our ancient, now almost extinct culture, only fragments of which remain in our people.' His very appearance made one think of "an ancient Russian peasant man who'd come through the University, learnt something about the civilization but still retained in himself most of the characteristics he had before," the biographer noted. Being regarded by the St. Petersburg literary society a "coarse peasant with few social graces and a provincial accent" didn't prevent Pisemsky from achieving a solid career in literature, and by the end of the 1850s his reputation was at its peak.

In Saint Petersburg Pisemsky made friends with Ivan Panaev, one of the editors of Sovremennik, and sent him his novel The Rich Fiancé, written in 1851 and satirizing characters like Rudin and Pechorin. Skabichevsky thought it was ridiculous the way the magazine which pretended to be the guiding light of the Russian intelligentsia had fallen for the Rich Fiancé where this very same intelligentsia (in the Shamilov character) was dragged through the mud. For Pisemsky, the alliance with Sovremennik felt natural, for he was indifferent towards all political parties and the Slavophile movement appealed to him as little as the ideas of the Westernizers. Annenkov wrote:

For all of his spiritual closeness to the common people, Pisemsky was not a Slavophile. He... did love Moscow, but not for its sacred places, historical memories, or its world-famous name, but because in Moscow people never took 'down-to-earth passions' and manifestations of natural energy for 'looseness', or regarded a deviation from the police-driven order a crime. Equally important for him was that thousands of raznochintsy and muzhiks were coming to the city from all over Russia, making it harder for the authorities to keep social hierarchies intact. Petersburg for Pisemsky looked like living proof of how a state-run order could bring about total lifelessness and what a well of outrageousness could be concealed in a seemingly honest and harmonious state of things.

From 1853 Pisemsky's life started to change. Despite his popularity he, according to Annenkov, "was still a literary proletarian who had to count money. His house was kept in perfect order by his wife but the simplicity of it showed that the economy was forced. To improve his situation he resumed working as a governmental clerk but soon stopped." Pisemsky started to write less. 1854 saw the publication of Fanfaron in Sovremennik, and a patriotic drama The Veteran and the Newcomer in Otechestvennye Zapiski. In 1855, the latter published "Carpenters' Cartel" and Is She To Blame?. Both enjoyed success and in his 1855 end of the year review Nikolai Chernyshevsky picked the latter as his book of the year. All of this still failed to translate into financial stability and the author openly criticized editors and publishers for exploiting their employees. He remained relatively poor up until 1861 when the publisher and entrepreneur Fyodor Stellovsky bought the rights to all of his works for 8 thousand rubles.

In 1856 Pisemsky, along with several other writers, was commissioned by the Russian Navy ministry to report on the ethnographical and commercial conditions of the Russian interior, his particular field of inquiry being Astrakhan and the region of the Caspian Sea. Critics later opined that the author hadn't been prepared for such a task and what little material he produced was "insufferably dull and filled not with his own impressions but with fragments of other works concerning the lands he visited" (Skabichevsky). Four of his stories appeared in 1857 in Morskoi Sbornik, and Biblioteka Dlya Chteniya published three more in 1857–1860. Later they were all gathered in a book called Traveller's Sketches (Путевые очерки). 1857 saw just one short story, "The Old Lady", which appeared in Biblioteka Dlya Chtenia, but by this time he was working on his novel One Thousand Souls.

Pisemsky's short stories of the late 1850s and early 1860s, which dealt primarily with rural life ("The Carpenters' Cartel", "Leshy", "The Old Man") again demonstrated the author's utter pessimism and skepticism towards all the most fashionable ideas of his time. Neither idealizing the Russian peasantry, nor mourning its faults (both tendencies were common in Russian literature of the time), the author was critical of the Emancipation reform of 1861 which gave freedom to serfs. "Pisemsky thought that without strong moral authority in the lead, the Russians wouldn't be able to get rid of the vices they'd acquired through centuries of slavery and state oppression; that they'd easily adapt to the new institutions and that the worst side of their national character would flourish with still greater fervency. His own life experience led him to believe that the well-being would father more vice than the misery that had initially been at the root of it," Annenkov wrote. According to Skabichevsky, in Pisemky's peasant stories, showing as they do a deep knowledge of common rural life, the protest against oppression was conspicuously absent which made them look as impassively objective as Émile Zola's novel La Terre. "Pisemsky's peasants, like those of Zola, are wild men driven by basic animal instincts; as all primitive men do, they combine high spiritual aspirations with beastly cruelty, often veering between these two extremes with ease," the biographer argued.

==== Biblioteka Dlya Chteniya ====
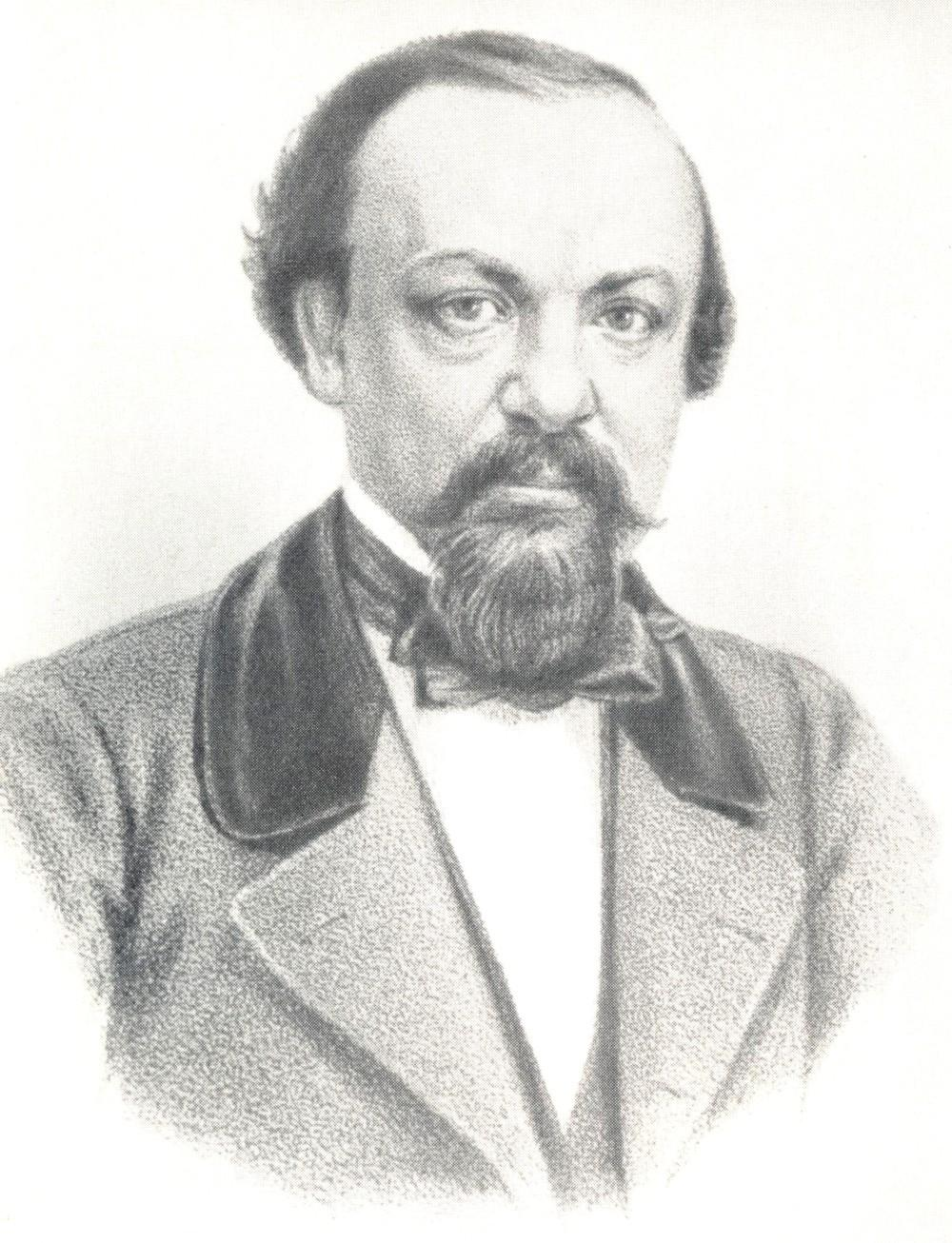

In the mid-1850s Pisemsky's relationship with Sovremennik started to deteriorate. On the one hand, he was uninterested in the magazine's social stance; on the other, Sovremennik, although greatly respecting his talent and always ready to publish any strong piece of Pisemsky's work that came their way, were keeping their distance. One exception was Alexander Druzhinin, described as a man of "eclectic views, a snobbish Anglophile and a follower of the 'art for art's sake' doctrine" who was on friendly terms with the 'soil-bound' Moskvityanin. To Sovremennik this was unacceptable. After the Crimean War the new Sovremennik radicals' clique removed Druzhinin from the magazine staff and he moved to Biblioteka Dlya Chteniya. Upset by this, Pisemsky sent his novel One Thousand Souls (the title refers to the number of serfs a landowner had to have in order to be considered wealthy) to Otechestvennye Zapiski where it was published in 1858. In his previous works the author had dealt with local aspects of provincial life; he now endeavoured upon creating a full and damning picture of it "highlighting atrocities which were common at the time." "The history of governor Kalinovich was no worse than Saltykov-Schedrin's Provincial Sketches and easily as important," Skabichevsky said. The figure of Kalinovich, a man full of contradictions and conflicts, caused much controversy. Nikolay Dobrolyubov barely mentioned Pisemsky's novel in Sovremennik, alleging only that "the social side of the novel was artificially sewn to a made-up idea." As editor of Biblioteka Dlya Chtenya, which was in decline, Druzhinin (now terminally ill with consumption) invited Pisemsky to be co-editor. From 1858 to 1864 the latter was the actual leader of the magazine.

The 1859 play A Bitter Fate marked another peak moment in Pisemsky's career. It was based on a real-life story which the author encountered when, as a Governor's special envoy in Kostroma, he took part in investigating a similar case. Until the emergence of Tolstoy's The Power of Darkness it remained the only drama about Russian peasant life staged in Russia. A Bitter Fate was awarded the Uvarov Prize, was staged at Alexandrinsky Theatre in 1863, and later gained the reputation of a classic of 19th century Russian drama. In 1861 his short novel An Old Man's Sin was published, arguably "one of his gentlest and most emotional works, full of sympathy for the lead character."

In the mid-1850s Pisemsky was widely praised as one of the leading authors of the time, alongside Ivan Turgenev, Ivan Goncharov and Fyodor Dostoyevsky who as late as 1864, in one of his letters, referred to "the colossal name that is Pisemsky." Then came his dramatic fall from grace, for which there were several reasons. One was that, as Skabichevsky noted, Pisemsky had never repudiated his 'troglodyte' mindset of a 'provincial obscurantist'; exotic in the early 1850s, it became scandalous at the end of the decade. Another had to do with the fact that people he regarded as "crooks, whores and demagogues" had suddenly reinvented themselves as the "progressives". Gradually Biblioteka Dlya Chtenya, the journal he was now leading, came into a direct opposition with Sovremennik. First, as Pyotr Boborykin remembered, this opposition was of a moderate character, "at home, in his cabinet, Pisemsky spoke about this with sorrow and regret, rather than aggression". Later biographers conceded that there had been some logic to his chagrin. "People who came to herald such radical principles, in his eyes, should have been impeccable in every respect, which wasn't the case," Skabichevsky remarked.

Following the common trend, Biblioteka started its own section for humorous sketches and feuilletons, and in 1861 Pisemsky debuted there – first as "State councilor Salatushka", then as Nikita Bezrylov. The latter's first feuilleton, published in the December issue and making fun of liberal trends and views, made quite a stir. In May 1862 Iskra magazine came up with a scathing retort, calling the unknown author 'dumb and ignorant', 'having by nature a very limited mind' and accusing the editor of Biblioteka of providing space for 'reactionaries'. Pisemsky, in a rather reserved way, blamed Iskra for trying to "soil his honest name", but then Nikita Bezrylov came up with a reply of his own which was quite a match for the Iskra article in terms of outright rudeness. Iskra editors Viktor Kurochkin and N.A. Stepanov went so far as to challenge Pisemsky to a duel, but the latter refused. The Russky Mir newspaper defended Pisemsky and published a letter of protest, signed by 30 authors. This, in its own turn, provoked Sovremennik to come up with a letter denouncing Pisemsky and signed, among others, by its leaders Nikolay Nekrasov, Nikolay Chernyshevsky and Ivan Panaev.

==== Move to Moscow ====
The scandal had a devastating effect upon Pisemsky, who "has fallen into a state of total apathy, as he used to do in difficult times," according to Lev Anninsky. Retired from his position at Biblioteka Dlya Chtenya, he severed all ties with literary Saint Petersburg and at the end of 1862 moved to Moscow, where he spent the rest of his life. Pisemsky worked in a hectic manner, devoting the whole of 1862 to Troubled Seas. Of this book's background Pyotr Boborykin wrote: "A journey abroad, to the London exhibition, meeting Russian émigrés there, and hearing many curious stories and anecdotes concerning the propagandists of those times confirmed Pisemsky in his decision to paint a broader picture of Russian society, and I don't doubt the sincerity with which he embarked upon this task." Indeed, in April 1862 Pisemsky went abroad and in June visited Alexander Herzen in London so as to explain his position towards the revolutionary democratic press. He failed to get any support, though.

The first two parts of it, Boborykin opined, might as well have been published by Sovremennik; in fact, the latter's envoys visited Pisemsky, with this in mind. "These two parts I've heard recited by the author himself and by them nobody could have guessed that the novel would turn out to be so unpleasant for the younger generation," Boborykin wrote. Skabichevsky doubted the chronology, though, reminding that in the end of 1862 Pisemsky was already in Moscow. According to his theory, the novel's first two parts might have been ready by the late 1861 when, despite strained relations between the journal and the author the latter still wasn't known as 'an irreconcilable reactionary', the label it given him in early 1862. The second part, written after the break, was extraordinarily vicious in tone. In general, the novel showed Russian society in the most miserable light, as a "sea of grief", harbouring beneath the surface "vile monsters and anemic fishes amongst stinking sea-weed." The novel, where the ugliest characters turned out to be political radicals, naturally received negative reviews, not only in the democratic press (Maxim Antonovich in Sovremennik, Varfolomey Zaitsev in Russkoye Slovo) but also in the centrist magazines like Otechestvennye Zapiski which denounced Troubled Seas as a rude caricature of the new generation.

=== Later life ===
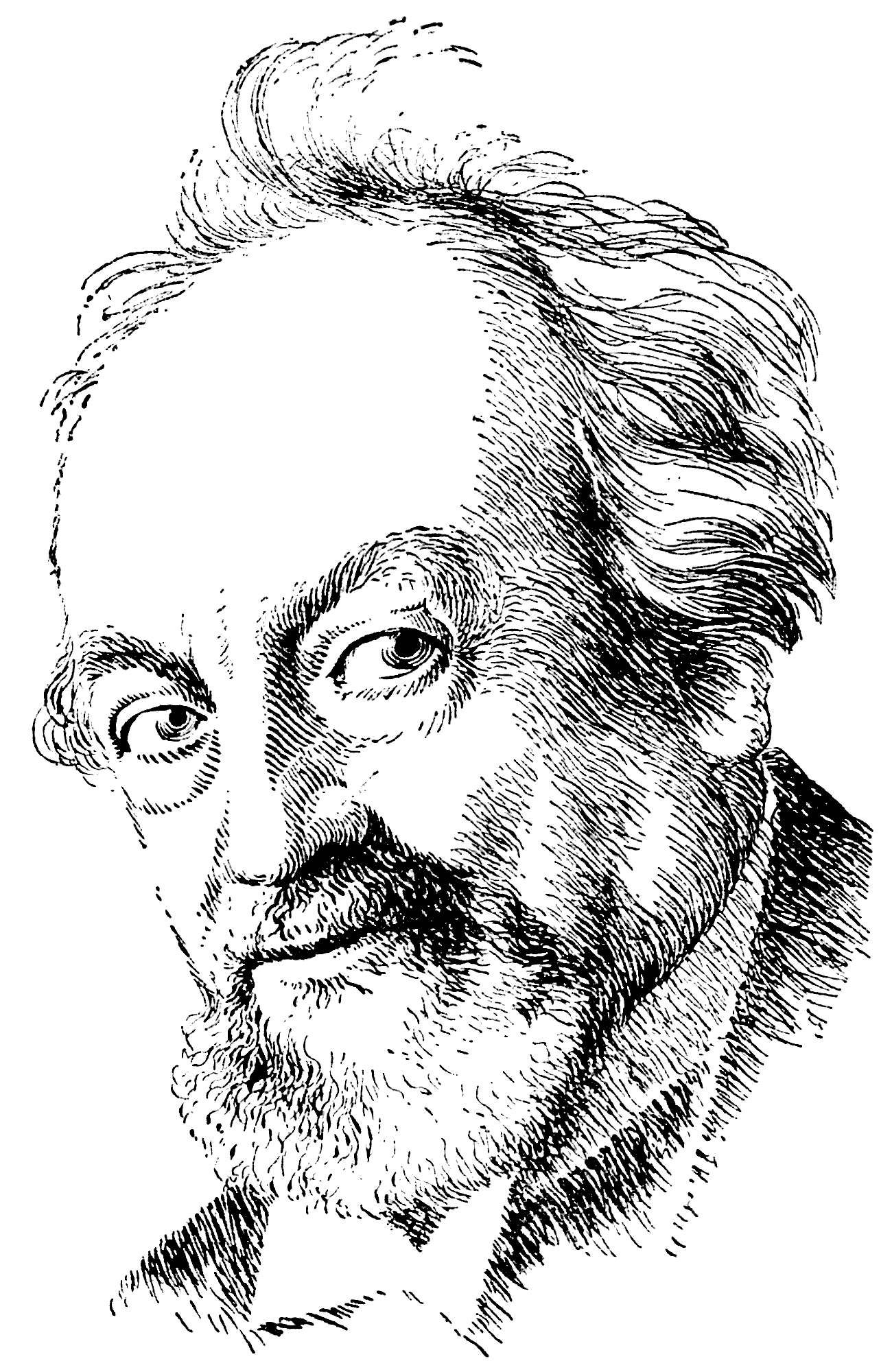
Alexey Pisemskiy

After moving to Moscow, Pisemsky joined The Russian Messenger as the head of the literary department. In 1866, on the recommendation of Interior minister Pyotr Valuyev, he became a local government councilor, the job providing him the financial independence he was craving for. Being now a well-paid author and a thrifty man, Pisemsky was able to build his fortune enough to enable him to leave work both at the magazine and the government office. In the late 1860s he bought a small piece of land on Borisoglebsky Lane in Moscow and built himself a house there. All seemed well, but only on the face of it. Troubled Seas (1863) and Russian Liars (1864) were his last critically acclaimed works. Then came the political drama The Warriors and Those Who Wait (1864) and the dramatic dilogy Old Birds (1864), and Birds of the Latest Gathering (1865), followed by the tragedy Men Above the Law, as well as two historical plays, full of melodramatic turns and naturalistic elements, Lieutenant Gladkov and Miloslavskys and Naryshkins (both 1867).

In 1869 Zarya published his semi-autobiographical novel People of the Forties. Its main character Vikhrov who the author associated himself with, has been found seriously wanting by critics. In 1871 Beseda published his novel In the Whirlpool, driven by the same leitmotif: the new 'high ideals' had nothing in common with Russian practical life and were therefore worthless. According to Skabichevsky, all the post-1864 works of Pisemsky were much weaker than everything he'd written before, demonstrating "the decline of a talent so dramatic it was unprecedented in Russian literature."

Then followed a series of pamphlet-type dramas (Baal, The Enlightened Times, and The Financial Genius) in which Pisemsky took it upon himself to fight the "blight of the time", all manner of financial misdoings. "In the earlier years I exposed stupidity, prejudices and ignorance, ridiculed childish romanticism and empty rhetoric, fought serfdom and denounced abuses of power, documented the emergence of the first flowers of our nihilism, which has now had their fruits, and finally have taken on human kind's worst enemy, Baal, the golden calf of worship... I've also brought light to things for everybody to see: the wrong-doings of entrepreneurs and purveyors are colossal, all trade [in Russia] is based upon the most vile deceit, theft in banks is business as usual and beyond all this scum, like angels, our military men stand shining," he explained in a private letter.

One of his comedies, Saps (Подкопы), was so outright in its critique of higher spheres it was banned by censors. Others were staged, but enjoyed only short-lived success, having to do mostly with the sensationalist aspect, for the public could recognize in certain characters real life officials and financiers. Artistically they were flawed, and even The Russian Messenger, which traditionally had supported the author, refused to publish The Financial Genius. After the stage production of the play flopped, Pisemsky returned to the form of the novel and in his last 4 years produced two of them: The Philistines, and Masons, the later being notable for its picturesque historical background created with the help of Vladimir Solovyov. Skabichevsky described both as "anemic and dull", and even Ivan Turgenev, who made great efforts to cheer Pisemsky up, still noted a streak of "tiredness" in the author's latest prose. "You were absolutely right: I am really tired of writing, and even more – of living. Of course old age is no fun for anybody, but for me it's especially bad and full of dark torment I wouldn't wish on my worst enemy," Pisemsky wrote back in a letter.

Losing popularity was one of the reasons for such misery. He scolded his critics, calling them "vipers", but was aware that his golden days were over. Vasily Avseenko, describing Pisemsky's visit to Saint Petersburg in 1869 after the publication of People of the Forties, recalled how old and tired he looked. "I am beginning to feel like a victim of my own spleen," Pisemsky confessed in an August 1875 letter to Annenkov. "I am all right physically, but cannot say the same of my mental and moral state; hypochondria torments me. I am unable to write and any mental effort makes me feel sick. Thank God the religious feeling, which is now blossoming in me, gives some respite to my suffering soul," Pisemsky wrote to Turgenev in the early 1870s.

In these difficult times the one person who continuously provided moral support to Pisemsky was Ivan Turgenev. In 1869 he informed Pisemsky that his One Thousand Souls had been translated into German and enjoyed "great success in Berlin". "So now the time has come for you to step outside the borders of your motherland and for Aleksey Pisemsky to become a European name," Turgenev wrote on 9 October 1869. "The best Berlin critic, Frenzel, in National Zeitung devoted a whole article to you where he calls your novel 'a rare phenomenon', and I tell you, now you are well known in Germany," wrote Turgenev in another letter, enclosing clips from other papers, too. "The success of One Thousand Souls encourages [the translator] to start upon the novel Troubled Seas and I am so happy both for you and for Russian literature in general… Critical reviews of One Thousand Souls here in Germany are most favourable, your characters are being compared to those of Dickens, Thackeray, etc, etc", he continued. Julian Schmidt’s large article in Zeitgenossensche Bilder, part of the series devoted to first class European authors, provided for Pisemsky another cause to celebrate, and following Turgenev's advice, in 1875 he visited Schmidt to thank him personally.

Another joyful event of these final years of Pisemsky's life was the commemoration, on 19 January 1875, of the 25th anniversary of his literary career. One of the speakers, the Beseda editor Sergey Yuryev, said:

Among the brightest of our writers who have played a great role in the development of our national consciousness, A. F. Pisemsky stands on his own. His works, and his dramas in particular, reflected the spirit of our ailing times, the symptoms of which make every honest heart ache. On the one hand, there's this horrid disease that's taken over our society: greed and cupidity, the worship of material wealth, on the other, the monstrous decline of moral values in our society, the tendency to reject the most sacred foundations of human existence, looseness in relationships, both private and social. Baal and Saps are the works that document the advent of this Egyptian leprosy most eloquently... It is true that Pisemsky tends to show only anomalies, depicting the most sick and outrageous things. From this, though, it doesn't follow that he's got no ideals. Its just that the brighter the writer's ideal shines, the more ugly all deviations from it seem to him, the more ardently he comes to attack them. Only the bright light of a true idealist can reveal life's monstrosities with such intensity.

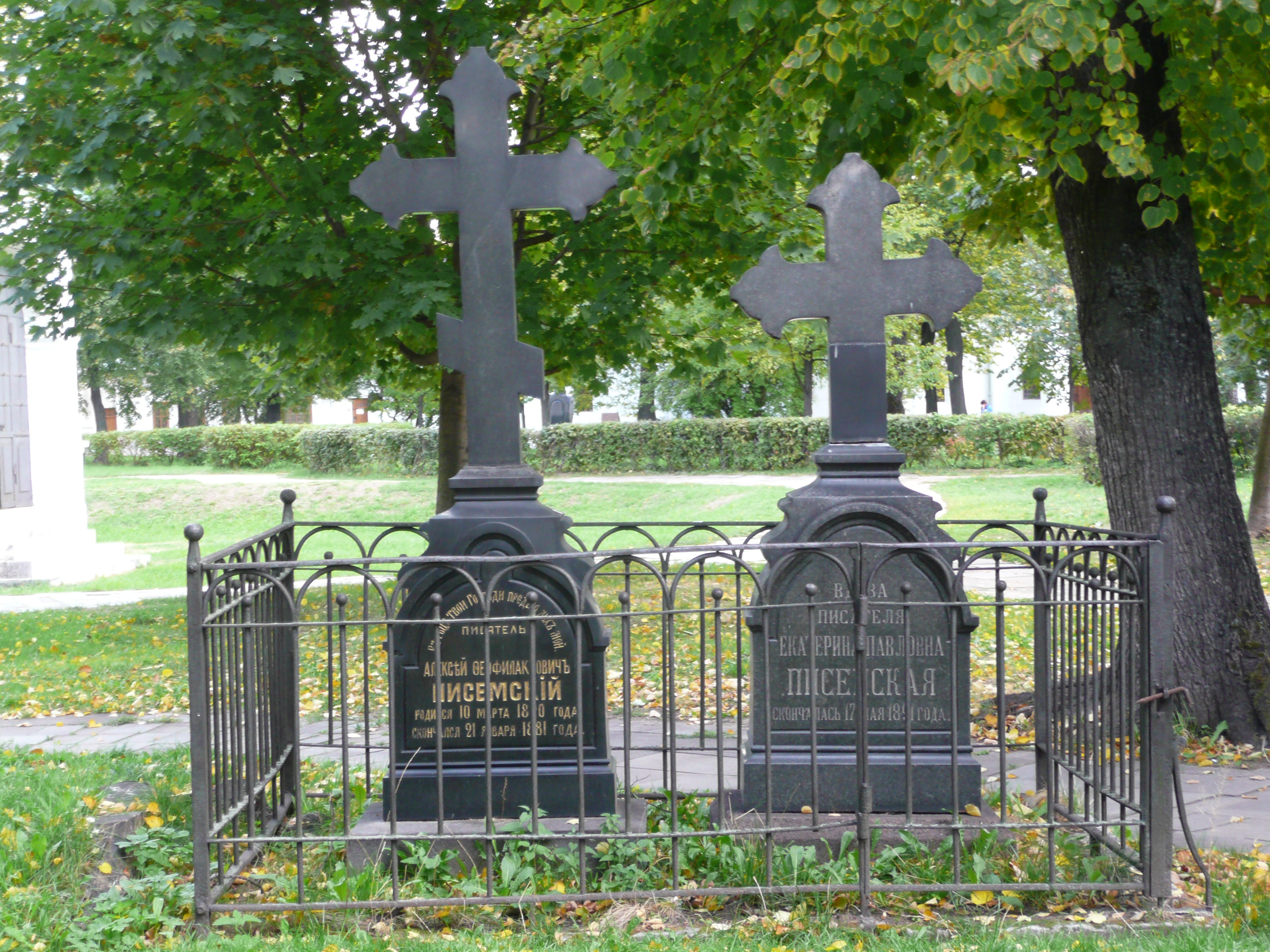
The tombs of Aleksey Pisemsky and his wife at the Novodevichy Convent

"My 25 years in literature have not been easy. While fully aware of how weak and inadequate my efforts have been, I still feel like I've every reason to continue: I never came under somebody else's flag, and my writing, good or bad, it's not for me to judge, contained only what I myself felt and thought. I remained true to my own understanding of things, never violating for any fleeting reason the modest talent nature gave me. One of my guiding lights has always been my desire to tell my country the truth about itself. Whether or not I succeeded, is not for me to tell," Pisemsky said in reply.

In the late 1870s Pisemsky's beloved younger son Nikolai, a talented mathematician, committed suicide for reasons which were unexplained. This was a heavy blow for his father who sunk into a deep depression. In 1880 his second son Pavel, the Moscow University Law faculty docent, became fatally ill, and this finished Pisemsky off. As Annenkov remembered, he "became bed-ridden, crushed by the weight of fits of pessimism and hypochondria which became more frequent after his family's catastrophe. His widow said later she never suspected that the end was near and thought the bout would pass, dissolving as it used to into physical weakness and melancholy. But this one proved to be the last for the tormented Pisemsky, who lost all willingness to resist."

On 21 January 1881 Pisemsky died, only a week before the death of Fyodor Dostoyevsky. Whereas the latter's funeral in Saint Petersburg became a grandiose event, Pisemsky's burial went unnoticed. Of well-known authors only Alexander Ostrovsky was present. In 1885 the Wolf Publishing House issued an edition of the Complete Pisemsky in 24 volumes. Pisemsky's personal archive was destroyed by fire. His house was later demolished. Borisoglebsky Lane, where he spent his last years, was renamed Pisemsky Street in the Soviet times.

== Private life ==
Pisemsky's first romantic affairs, according to his autobiography, concerned various cousins. After the University, he developed an interest in what he termed "George Sandean free love" but soon became disillusioned and decided to marry, "selecting for this purpose a girl not of a coquettish type, coming from a good, even if not wealthy family," namely Yekaterina Pavlovna Svinyina, daughter of Pavel Svinyin, the founder of Otechestvennye Zapiski magazine. They married on 11 October 1848. "My wife is portrayed partially in Troubled Seas, as Evpraxia, who's also nicknamed Ledeshka (Piece of Ice)," he wrote. This was a practical marriage without any romantic passion involved, yet a fortunate one for Pisemsky, for, according to many people who knew her, Svinyina was a woman of rare virtues. "This exceptional woman proved able to calm down his sick hypochondria, and free him not only from all the domestic obligations involved in bringing up children, but also from her own meddling into his private affairs, which were full of whims and rush impulses. Besides, she re-wrote by her own hand no less than two thirds of his original manuscripts which invariably looked like crooked, indecipherable scribbling furnished with ink-blots," wrote Pavel Annenkov.

Biographer Semyon Vengerov quoted a source who knew Pisemsky closely as having called Yekaterina Pavlovna "a perfect literary wife who took very close to her heart all the literary anxieties and troubles of her husband, all the jigsaws of his creative career, cherishing his talent and doing whatever was possible to keep him in conditions favourable to the development of his talent. Add to all this a rare leniency, of which she had to have a great deal of, to put up with Aleksey, who occasionally demonstrated qualities not congenial with being a family man." Ivan Turgenev, in one of his letters, imploring Pisemsky to get rid of this spleen of his, wrote: "I think I've told you this once, but I might as well repeat it. Do not forget that in the lottery of life you've won a major prize: you have an excellent wife and nice children..."

=== Personality ===
According to Lev Anninsky, Pisemsky's personal mythology "revolved around one word: fear." Biographers reproduced numerous anecdotes about him being scared of sailing and other things, and how he was often 'stuck on the front porch of his house, uncertain whether he should enter: thinking that robbers were there, or somebody had died, or a fire had started'. Quite striking were his extraordinary collection of phobias and fears, along with general hypochondria." In an 1880 letter to photographer Konstantin Shapiro who had recently published his gallery of Russian writers he confessed: "My portrait repeats the one flaw which all of my photographic portraits have, my not knowing how to pose. In all of my photographs my eyes come out goggled and frightened and even somewhat mad, maybe because as they put me facing the camera obscura, I do experience – if not fear, then strong anxiety."

People who knew Pisemsky personally remembered him warmly, as a man whose weaknesses were outweighed by virtues, of which a keen sense of justice, good humour, honesty, and modesty were the most obvious. According to Arkady Gornfeld, "His whole character, from the inability to understand foreign cultures to ingenuousness, humour, keenness of remarks and common sense – was that of a simple, if very clever, Russian muzhik. His main personal feature became a major literary asset: truthfulness, sincerity, total lack of the faults of pre-Gogol literature, like over-intensity and eagerness to say something that was beyond the author's understanding," he remarked in his essay on Gogol. Pavel Annenkov wrote of Pisemsky:

He was an extraordinary artist and at the same time an ordinary man – in the noblest sense of this word... In our age of making huge fortunes and big reputations he remained indifferent to anything that might have incited vanity or pride... Any kind of jealousy was totally foreign to him, as well as any drive to make himself publicly noticeable… The sharpness of his prose notwithstanding, Pisemsky was the most good-natured person. And there was another distinctive quality in him. The worst catastrophy for him was injustice, of which he considered not the suffering but the guilty side to be the major victim.

== Legacy ==
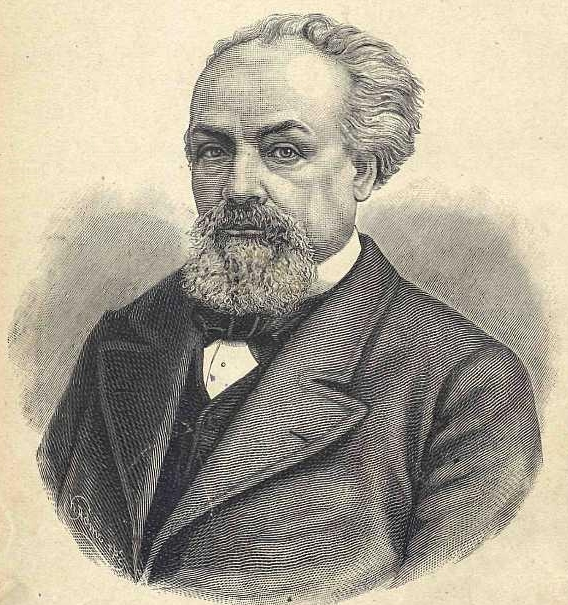
Alexey Pisemskiy

Contemporary critics differed greatly in trying to classify Pisemsky's prose or assess his position in Russian literature. In retrospect, this position altered dramatically with the times and, as critic and biographer Lev Anninsky noted, while Melnikov-Pechersky or Nikolai Leskov have always been far from the literary mainstream, Pisemsky spent some time as a 'first rank' author and was praised as an 'heir to Gogol' in the course of the 1850s, then dropped from the elite to slide into almost total oblivion which lasted for decades. According to Anninsky, "more daring critics drew a parallel with Gogol... whose final years sort of pre-dated the future drama of Pisemsky: breaking away from the 'progressive Russia', the 'betrayal' and the ostracism that followed. But Russia's forgiven Gogol everything: the pose of an angry prophet, the second volume of Dead Souls, those 'reactionary' passages from The Chosen Fragments of Correspondence with Friends. As for Pisemsky, Russia refused to forgive him a single thing," the critic argued.

Having entered the Russian literary scene when it was dominated by the natural school, Pisemsky has been regarded as arguably its most notable proponent. This wasn't obvious to many of his contemporaries, though; both Pavel Annenkov and Alexander Druzhinin (critics of different camps) argued that Pisemsky's earlier works were not only foreign to the natural school, but stood in direct opposition to it. Apollon Grigoriev (who in 1852 wrote: "The Muff is the... artistic antidote to the sickly rubbish the 'Natural School' authors produce") went even further ten years later, stating in Grazhdanin that Pisemsky with his "low-brow wholesomeness" was far more important to Russian literature than Goncharov (with his "affected nods to narrow-minded pragmatism"), Turgenev (who "surrendered to all false values") and even Leo Tolstoy (who had "made his way to artlessness in the most artful manner").

In the 1850s, concentrating on the everyday life of the small-scale provincial Russian, Pisemsky recreated this world as totally devoid of romantic features. "He mercilessly destroyed the poetic aura of 'noblemen’s nests' that was created by Tolstoy and Turgenev," recreating the life of the community where all relations looked ugly and "real love was always losing to cool flirting or open deceit," biographer Viduetskaya wrote. On the other hand, in "picturing the Russian muzhik, and being the master of reproducing the language of the lower classes, Pisemsky had no equals; after him a return to the type of peasant novel created by Grigorovich became unthinkable", critic A. Gornfeld argued. As D. S. Mirsky put it in his 1926 History of Russian Literature, "Like others among the Russian realists, Pisemsky is gloomy rather than otherwise but again in a different way – his gloom is nothing like Turgenev's hopeless surrender to the mysterious forces of the universe, but a hearty and virile disgust at the vileness of the majority of mankind and at the futility in particular of the Russian educated classes."

The inability of contemporary critics to sum up Pisemsky in a more or less congruous manner, according to Anninsky, might be explained by the fact that the world of Pisemsky (for whom "artistic intuition was the instrument of logic") was "rough and soft, unprepossessing and vulnerable", open to all manner of interpretations. The ground that Pisemsky stood on, as Anninsky saw it, was doomed from the start: stronger authors (Tolstoy and Turgenev, in particular) entered the scene, created new, more interesting characters, re-worked this soil and made it their own.

According to Viduetskaya, Pisemsky's original driving force was negativism which had been played out by the early 1860s. Seeing as the peak of his post-reform legacy the cycle Russian Liars (1865), the critic considers Pisemsky the novelist a marginal force in Russian literature, admitting, though, that writers like Dmitry Mamin-Sibiryak and Alexander Sheller were among his followers. But as a short story writer he might be considered as a predecessor to such masters of the form as Leskov and Chekhov, Viduetskaya suggested. According to D. S. Mirsky,

Pisemsky, who kept himself uncontaminated by idealism, was in his own time regarded as much more characteristically Russian than his more cultured contemporaries. And this is true, Pisemsky was in much closer touch with Russian life, in particular, with the life of the uneducated middle and lower classes than were the more genteel novelists. He was, together with Ostrovsky and before Leskov, the first to open that wonderful gallery of Russian characters of non-noble birth... Pisemsky's great narrative gift and exceptionally strong grip on reality make him one of the best Russian novelists and if this is not sufficiently realized, it is because of his regrettable lack of culture. It was lack of culture that made Pisemsky too weak to hold out against the ravages of the age and permitted him to degenerate so sadly in his later work.

== Selected works ==
=== Novels and novellas ===
- The Simpleton (Тюфяк, 1850)
- The Comic Actor (Комик, 1851)
- The Rich Fiancé (Богатый жених, 1854)
- The Old Proprietress (Старая барыня, 1857)
- Boyarschina (Боярщина, 1858)
- One Thousand Souls (Тысяча душ, 1858)
- An Old Man's Sin (Старческий грех, 1861)
- Troubled Seas (Взбаламученнео море, 1863)
- Men of the Forties (Люди сороковых годов, 1869)
- In the Whirlpool (В водовороте, 1871)
- The Philistines (Мещане, 1877)
- Masons (Масоны, 1880)

=== Plays ===
- The Hypochondriac (Ипохондрик, 1852)
- The Allotment (Раздел, 1852)
- A Bitter Fate (Горькая судьбина, 1859)
- Lieutenant Gladkov (Поручик Гладков, 1864)
- The Warriors and Those Who Wait (Бойцы и выжидатели, 1867)
- Miloslavsky and the Naryshkins (Милославский и Нарышкины, 1967)
- Men Above the Law (Самоуправцы, 1867)
- Predators (Хищники, 1872)
- Baal (Ваал, 1873)
- The Enlightened Times (Просвещённое время, 1875)
- The Financial Genius (Финансовый гений, 1876)

=== English translations ===
- The Old Proprietress, (story), from Anthology of Russian Literature, Vol 2, G. P. Putnam's Sons, 1903.
- One Thousand Souls, (novel), Grove Press, NY, 1959 (translated by Ivy Litvinov).
- A Bitter Fate, (play), from Masterpieces of the Russian Drama, Vol 1, Dover Publications, NY, 1961.
- Nina, The Comic Actor, and An Old Man's Sin, (short novels), Ardis Publishers, 1988. ISBN 0-88233-986-9
- The Simpleton, (novel), Foreign Languages Publishing House, Moscow.

== Notes ==
=== Sources ===
- Banham, Martin, ed. 1998. The Cambridge Guide to Theatre. Cambridge: Cambridge UP. ISBN 0-521-43437-8.
- Introduction to Nina, The Comic Actor, and An Old Man's Sin, Maya Jenkins, Ardis Publishers, 1988.
- McGraw-Hill Encyclopedia of World Drama, Volume 1, Stanley Hochman, McGraw-Hill, 1984.
