= The Philistines (Pisemsky novel) =

1877 novel by Alexey Pisemsky

- Author: Alexey Pisemsky
- Original title: Мещане
- Language: Russian
- Publisher: Pchela (original); Khudozhestvennaya Literatura
- Publication date: 1877
- Publication place: Russian Empire
- Media type: Print (paperback & hardback)
- Followed by: Masons (1880)

The Philistines (Russian: Мещане, romanized: Meshchane) is a three-part novel by Alexey Pisemsky started in 1873 and finished, according to the author's autograph, on 24 October 1877. Originally serialized by Mikhail Mikeshin-edited Pchela (Bee) magazine, in Nos. 18–49, 1877, it came out as a separate edition in 1878, published again by Mikeshin

The novel is considered to be thematically akin to the plays by Pisemsky (Baal, 1873, Enlighted Times, 1875 and The Financial Genius, 1876) which satirized the emerging Russian capitalism.

Describing the novel's hero Begushev, a 'fearless knight' facing on his own the world of greed and crime, Pisemsky (in a 23 February letter to Mikeshin, the magazine's publisher and a renowned artist of the time) wrote: "...In his portrait please try to conjoin the features of [Mikhail] Bestuzhev and Hertzen, for it's their faces that I'd had in my imagination".
