= Boyarshchina =

1858 novel by Aleksey Pisemsky

- Author: Aleksey Pisemsky
- Original title: Боярщина
- Language: Russian
- Publisher: Biblioteka Dlya Chtenya
- Publication date: 1858
- Publication place: Russia
- Media type: Print (hardback & paperback)

Boyarshchina (Russian: Боя́рщина) is an early novel by Aleksey Pisemsky. Written in 1844-1846 under the original title Is She to Blame? (Виновата ли она?), it was published only in 1858 in Biblioteka Dlya Chteniya magazine (vol. 147, books 1 and 2).

== History ==
The novel has a long and complicated history which has been reconstructed only partially, according to Pisemsky's biographer M.P. Yeryomin. Pisemsky started working upon it in 1844 and finished it in 1846. In the 1858 magazine version he dated it "September 30, 1844, Moscow", then four years later, in the Stellovsky edition, "September 30, 1845, Moscow". Later in his autobiography and in a letter to his French translator Victor Dereli he insisted the novel was finished in 1846. The reason for this, according to Yeryomin, was that the novel existed in three different versions, the first of which was completed in 1844. In summer and autumn of 1845 in Moscow Pisemsky continued to change the text, hence the new date. It was then that he sent a copy to Stepan Shevyryov, then a Moskvityanin critic, who advised the author to revise the text. On March 13, 1847, Pisemsky in a letter informed Shevyryov (mentioning a character whose namewas later changed to Zador-Manovsky): "I've made changes to the novelet Is She to Blame? according to your instructions. Smoothened some scenes, and what's more important, paid more attention to Vankovsky, the heroine's husband, made him more humane, as it were."

In 1848 Pisemsky sent the novel to Otechestvennye zapisky but even this new 'softened' version was rejected by censors. In 1850 Pisemsky tried to publish the novel in Moscow using his friend and mentor Alexander Ostrovsky's influence. "I'm quite prepared to re-work it and remove some harsh scenes. In Saint Petersburg it was banned, do you think it has any chance to pass through in Moscow? I'd like to see it printed wherever you'd like, in your almanac, in Moskvityanin, just so that it won't be wasted, I feel so sorry for it even if now I'm slightly grown out of it, I think," Pisemsky wrote to Ostrovsky on 26 December 1850. Whether the novel has been sent to Moskvityanin or not, remained unknown.

As late as March 1857 Pisemsky referred to his novel as Is She to Blame?, even if this title had been used already for a completely different novelet, published in 1855 by Sovremennik. Only after it became clear Biblioteka Dlya Chtenya will publish the book, its title was changed to Boyarshchina. Apparently, having lost all hope in seeing the novel printed, Pisemsky used several of its scenes in his other work, notably The Rich Fiancee. Biblioteka Dlya Chtenya published the novel in its original form, not the 'improved' version the author informed Shevyryov about.
