= Realism (theatre) =

Movement in 19th-century theatre

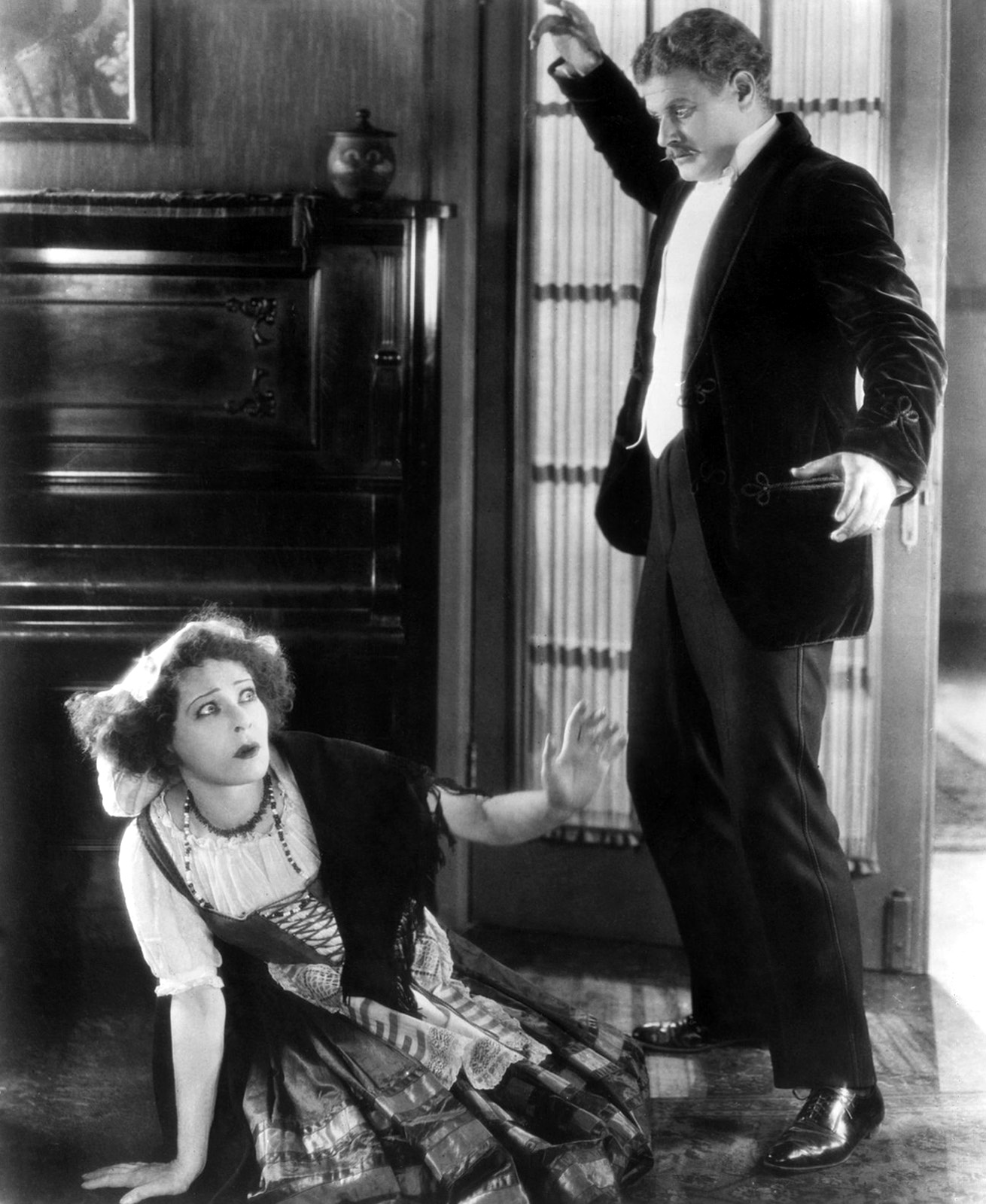
Scene from A Doll's House, a 1922 silent film starring Alla Nazimova and Alan Hale Sr. The author of the original play, Henrik Ibsen, was an influential proponent of realism in the theatre.

Realism was a general movement that began in 19th-century theatre, around the 1870s, and remained present through much of the 20th century. 19th-century realism is closely connected to the development of modern drama, which "is usually said to have begun in the early 1870s" with the "middle-period" work of the Norwegian dramatist Henrik Ibsen. Ibsen's realistic drama in prose has been "enormously influential."

It developed a set of dramatic and theatrical conventions with the aim of bringing a greater fidelity of real life to texts and performances. These conventions occur in the text, (set, costume, sound, and lighting) design, performance style, and narrative structure. They include recreating on stage a facsimile of real life except missing a fourth wall (on proscenium arch stages). Characters speak in naturalistic, authentic dialogue without verse or poetic stylings, and acting is meant to emulate human behaviour in real life. Narratives typically are psychologically driven, and include day-to-day, ordinary scenarios. Narrative action moves forward in time, and supernatural presences (gods, ghosts, fantastic phenomena) do not occur. Sound and music are diegetic only. Part of a broader artistic movement, it includes Naturalism and Socialist realism.

Russia's first professional playwright, Aleksey Pisemsky, along with Leo Tolstoy (in his The Power of Darkness of 1886), began a tradition of psychological realism in Russia. A new type of acting was required to replace the declamatory conventions of the well-made play with a technique capable of conveying the speech and movements found in the domestic situations of everyday life. This need was supplied by the innovations of the Moscow Art Theatre, founded by Konstantin Stanislavski and Vladimir Nemirovich-Danchenko. Whereas the subtle expression of emotion in Anton Chekhov's The Seagull through everyday small-talk had initially gone unappreciated in a more traditionally conventional production in St Petersburg, a new staging by the Moscow Art Theatre brought the play and its author, as well as the company, immediate success. A logical development was to take the revolt against theatrical artifice a step further in the direction of naturalism, and Stanislavski, especially in his production of Maxim Gorky's The Lower Depths, helped this movement achieve international recognition. The Moscow Art Theatre's ground-breaking productions of plays by Chekhov, such as Uncle Vanya and The Cherry Orchard, in turn influenced Maxim Gorky and Mikhail Bulgakov. Stanislavski went on to develop his 'system', a form of actor training that is particularly well-suited to psychological realism.

In opera, verismo refers to a post-Romantic Italian tradition that sought to incorporate the Naturalism of Émile Zola and Henrik Ibsen. It included realistic – sometimes sordid or violent – depictions of contemporary everyday life, especially the life of the lower classes.

== Stanislavski's distinction ==
As part of a strategic argument in his day, Stanislavski used the term "psychological realism" to distinguish his 'system' of acting from his own Naturalistic early stagings of the plays of Anton Chekhov, Maxim Gorky, and others. Jean Benedetti argues that:

Naturalism, for him, implied the indiscriminate reproduction of the surface of life. Realism, on the other hand, while taking its material from the real world and from direct observation, selected only those elements which revealed the relationships and tendencies under the surface. The rest was discarded.

As used in critical literature today, however, the term Naturalism has a broader scope than that within which all of Stanislavski's work falls. In this broader sense, Naturalism or "psychological realism" is distinct both from Socialist realism and the critical realism developed by the epic theatre of Bertolt Brecht.

== See also ==
- Realism in the arts
- Socialist realism
- Chanson réaliste
- Naturalism (theatre)

== Sources ==
- Benedetti, Jean (2005). "Realism". Stanislavski: An Introduction. Routledge. pp. 16–19. ISBN 978-1-135-47020-3.
- Benedetti, Jean (1999). Stanislavski: His Life and Art. Revised edition. Original edition published in 1988. London: Methuen. ISBN 0-413-52520-1.
- Benedetti, Jean (2012). "Realism". The Art of the Actor: The Essential History of Acting from Classical Times to the Present Day. Routledge. pp. 99–108. ISBN 978-1-136-55619-7.
- Esslin, Martin (2001). "Modern Theatre 1890–1920". In Brown, John Russell (ed.). The Oxford Illustrated History of Theatre. Oxford University Press. ISBN 978-0-19-285442-1.
- Harrison, Martin (1998). The Language of Theatre. New York: Routledge. ISBN 0-87830-087-2.
