= Fyodor Stellovsky =

Russian publisher and editor (1826–1875)

- Born: Fyodor Timofeyevich Stellovsky; Фёдор Тимофеевич Стелловский; 1826; Moscow, Russian Empire
- Died: 27 April 1875 (aged 48–49); Saint Petersburg, Imperial Russia
- Occupations: Publisher, editor

Fyodor Timofeyevich Stellovsky (Russian: Фёдор Тимофеевич Стелловский, 1826 – 27 April 1875) was a prominent Russian publisher and editor.

== Biography ==
Stellovsky was born in Moscow. Among the composers whose music he published were Alexander Dargomyzhsky, Alexey Verstovsky, Alexander Serov, Alexander Varlamov, Ivan Khandoshkin and Mikhail Glinka, whose whole back catalogue he purchased in 1857. The popular works by several major foreign composers, including Mozart, Verdi and Weber have also came out through the Stellovsky Publishers for the first time in Russia.

In 1858–1860, Stellovsky edited and published Muzykalny i Teatralny Vestnik (Music and Theatre Herald), then the newspaper Russky Mir (Russian World), the magazines Gudok (Horn) and Yakor (Anchor), as well as the Music Album, a supplement to the Pantheon magazine. In 1860s Stellovsky moved into the literary publishing business too to launch the acclaimed series The Works by Russian Authors (Собрания сочинений русских авторов, 1861–1870). As part to it, the first major collections of several prominent Russian writers came out, including Leo Tolstoy (The Works of, parts 1 and 2, 1864), Alexey Pisemsky (vols. 1-4, 1861–1867) and Fyodor Dostoyevsky (vols. 1-4, 1865–1870). He died in Saint Petersburg.
