= Apollon Grigoryev =

Russian poet, critic, translator, memoirist and author (1822–1864)

Apollon Aleksandrovich Grigoryev
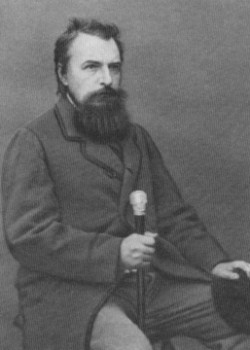
- Born: 20 July 1822; Moscow, Russia
- Died: 7 October 1864 (aged 42); Saint Petersburg, Russia
- Education: Imperial Moscow University (1842)
- Occupations: literary and theater critic, poet

Apollon Aleksandrovich Grigoryev (Note: Also transliterated Grigor'ev and Grigoriev.) (Russian: Аполло́н Алекса́ндрович Григо́рьев, IPA: [ɐpɐˈlon ɐlʲɪkˈsandrəvʲɪdʑ ɡrʲɪˈɡorʲjɪf]; 20 July 1822 – 7 October 1864) was a Russian poet, literary and theatrical critic, translator, memoirist and author of popular art songs. One historian called him "the best of the non-radical literary critics in the nineteenth century and arguably the greatest of all of Russia's critics in the century."

== Life ==
Grigoryev was born in Moscow, where his father was secretary to the city magistrate. He was educated at home, and studied at Imperial Moscow University.

=== Literary career ===
Several of Grigoryev's poems were published in Otechestvennye Zapiski in 1845, followed by a number of short verses, critical articles, theatrical reviews and translations in Repertuar and Pantheon. In 1846, Grigoryev published a poorly received book of poetry; He subsequently wrote little original poetry, focusing instead on translating works by Shakespeare (A Midsummer Night's Dream, The Merchant of Venice, Romeo and Juliet), Byron ("To parizinu" [a poem by this exact name does not exist, most likely meant Parisina (Russian: Паризину)] and fragments from Childe Harold), Molière and Delavigne.

Grigoryev's years in Saint Petersburg were stormy. In 1847 he returned to Moscow, becoming the jurisprudence teacher at the 1st Moscow secondary school and collaborating with Moscow. City. Leaf [most likely the Moscow City List, (Russian: Московском городском листке)]. In 1847 Grigoryev married Lydia Fedorovna Korsh (sister of writers Evgenii and Valentin Korsh), but for some time he was unproductive.

==== Moskvityanin ====
In 1850, Grigoryev became editor of Moskvityanin and leader of the young members of its staff. Despite its "old editorial staff" (Mikhail Pogodin, Stepan Shevyrev and Alexander Veltman), Grigoryev gathered a "young, daring, drunk, but honest and shining by gifts" circle: Alexander Ostrovsky, Aleksey Pisemsky, Boris Almazov, Alexei Potekhin, Andrey Pechersky, Yevgeny Edelson, Lev Mey, Nikolai Berg and Ivan Gorbunov. Although they were not Slavophiles, Moskvityanin attracted them because they could base their social and political ideology on Russian reality. Grigoryev was the chief theorist of the circle, reaching his peak during the early 1860s.

==== Later years ====
Grigoryev wrote for Moskvityanin until it ceased publication in 1856. He then worked for Russian Conversation, Reading Library, the original Russian Word (as one of three editors), Russian World, Svetoch, Albert Starchevsky's Syn Otechestva and Mikhail Katkov's Russian Herald.

In 1861, Grigoryev worked for a year at the Dostoyevsky brothers' Epoch [most likely the earlier Vremja, Time]. As at Moskvityanin, his circle consisted of pochvenniki; however, his enthusiasm waned and he returned to St. Petersburg. Grigoryev resumed his bohemian existence, falling into debt before he began writing theatre reviews for several newspapers. Although his reviews were popular, alcoholism had taken its toll and he died in 1864. Grigoryev is buried in Mitrofaniyevsky Cemetery, next to poet Lev Mey. Grigoryev's articles were collected and published in 1876 by Nikolay Strakhov.

== Critique ==
Grigoryev is difficult to evaluate, and his writing is characterized by opacity, darkness and a lack of discipline. His work in Moskvityanin, Time and Epoch appears careless, but he defended their "sincerity".) Grigoryev's worldview was unclear even to his friends and admirers; his final, unfinished article ("The Paradoxes of Organic Criticism"), in response to Dostoyevsky's invitation to state his critical philosophy, was typically wide-ranging. He referred to his style of criticism as "organic", in contrast to "theorists" (Chernyshevsky, Nikolai Dobrolyubov and Dmitri Pisarev), "aesthetics" and "historians" (Vissarion Belinsky). Although Grigoryev admired Belinsky, calling him an "immortal champion of ideas ... with [a] great and powerful spirit", he considered the latter's criticism too direct and logical.
