= Nikolai Melgunov =

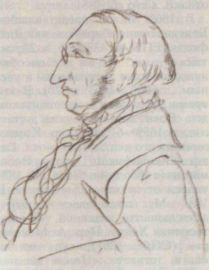
- Born: Николай Александрович Мельгунов; April 1804; Petrovskoye, Livensky Uyezd, Oryol Governorate, Russian Empire
- Died: 16 February 1867 (aged 62); Moscow, Russian Empire
- Occupations: writer, translator, editor, music critic

Nikolai Alexandrovich Melgunov (Russian: Николай Александрович Мельгунов; April 1804, – 16 February 1867) was a Russian writer, publicist, translator from German and French, and music critic, described as one of the most prolific and diverse authors of his time.

== Biography ==
Melgunov was born in village Petrovskoye in Oryol Governorate to a noble family of a retired army officer, and received good home education. In his teens he was sent to Kharkov to be tutored for the university exams and spent there three years which he later remembered with great affection. In 1818 the 14-year-old published his first translation, from French (The Coming of Spring, from Bernardin de Saint-Pierre), in Ukrainsky Vestnik, edited by the Kharkov professor Gonorsky, one of his then tutors.

After having studied for two years at the Courses for the children of nobility at the Saint Petersburg Pedagogical institute (where among his tutors were Wilhelm Kuchelbecker and Konstantin Arsenyev), Melgunov dropped out due to poor health and accompanied his father to Western Europe in a journey which lasted three years. After returning, the Melgunovs settled in Moscow where their house became an important center of the cultural life in the city in 1820s–1830s. Having passed the exams at the Moscow University enabling him to get the diploma, Melgunov joined the Foreign Ministry office where he worked mostly in archives and libraries until 1834. In mid-1820s he joined the circle of the Lyubomudrys. With fellow members Stepan Shevyryov and Vladimir Titov he translated the 1796 book Herzensergießungen eines kunstliebenden Klosterbruders (as On Artists and Art, in 1826) by Ludwig Tieck and Wilhelm Heinrich Wackenroder, which proved to be highly influential for the development of the Romantic literature in Russia.

In the early 1830s, writing mostly for Molva, Teleskop and Moskovsky Nablyudatel (the magazine designed with the express purpose of resisting the first wave of commercialism in Russian literature, which he was the co-founder of), Melgunov became a popular music critic and essayist. His work "Musical Letopis" has won him high praise from Vissarion Belinsky. A gifted piano player, he authored numerous romances, based on the poetry by Pushkin, Delvig and Alexey Khomyakov (whose work he especially admired), among many others. Some of them were collected in Pesni i romansy (Songs and Romances, 1832).

After retiring from the Foreign Ministry in 1834 Melgunov concentrated on popularizing Russian literature abroad. The book Literarische Bilder aus Russland by H. Konigs was written on the basis of its author talks with Melgunov, parts of it even dictated by the latter. This first attempt to present the coherent history of Russian literature to the Western reader was met with great appraisal in Germany and was soon translated into several European languages. The reaction in Russia was less benign. "Do not take Koenig at his word, this Muscovite [Melgunov] is of too high an opinion of his own club," Pyotr Pletnyov warned Yakov Grot in his 1841 letter. Strongly negative reviews arrived from Severnaya Ptchela and Syn Otechestva, the reviewers (Faddey Bulgarin and Ksenofont Polevoy, respectively) expressing their outrage with Melgunov's dismissal of a huge bulk of contemporary Russian authors as 'sell-outs'. Bulgarin in his letter addressed to Alexander von Benckendorff (then the head of the Special Corps of Gendarmes in Imperial Russia) even deplored the fact that "this M.[elgunov], Koenig's prompter, is still safe and well!"

Melgunov the prosaic debuted with Kto zhe on? (So Who's He?). The novel published by Teleskop in October–December 1831, was influenced, apparently, by Charles Maturin's 1820 Gothic novel Melmoth the Wanderer as well as the stories by E.T.A. Hoffmann. Three years later it was included into a two-volume compilation Tales of Truth and Fantasy (Рассказы о былом и небывалом, 1834) which also included short novels Zimny vecher (Winter Evening), Prorochesky son (Prophetic Dream) and Lyubov-vospitatel (Love the Educaor). These early attempts were well received by critics, notably Osip Senkovsky who favourably compared some of them to the prose by Alexander Pushkin.

In the late 1830s and early 1840s Melgunov lived mostly in Europe (Germany, Austria, Italy and France) writing critical essays on Russian authors, like Gogol and Lermontov. His late-1830s works were published in mid-1840s, under the pen name N. Livensky (Н. Ливенский) which he started to use, fearing the hostility on the part of his Slavophile opponents. They included the novel Tma i svet (Darkness and Light, 1844, published in fragments), as well as the novellas Zhivaya i mertvaya voda (Water Alive and Dead, 1844), Systematic (The System Man, 1844) and Svidetel (The Witness, 1845), they were dismissed by some critics as preposterous and overblown. Much better received were his traveller's sketches and critical essays, lively written and insightful.

In the 1840s and 1850s Melgunov adopted the centrist's position as regards the conflict between the Slavophiles and the Westerners in Russia, seeing both as the two extremes which could be seen and used as "stairs towards the synthesis," maintaining close links with Pyotr Chaadayev, Alexander Hertzen and Timofey Granovsky on the one hand, and Ivan Kireyevsky and Alexey Khomyakov on the other. Such a stance was not taken kindly by both parties and soon led to his departure from both Sovremennik and Moskvityanin.

In 1854–56 Мelgunov became close to Konstantin Kavelin and Boris Chicherin and took part in disseminating banned manuscripts of liberal authors. Three of his own essays, published by Hertzen in Voices from Russia in 1856–1857 were widely read and much discussed in Russia. In 1856 he moved to Paris started to work more actively for Hertzen's publications, coordinate efforts, collect the material and attract new authors. Ivan Turgenev, whom he met here on several occasions, while making fun of what he referred to Melgunov's 'eccentricities', still spoke affectionately of his 'gentle, pure character'.

In the late 1850s Otechestvennye Zapiski published Melgunov's acclaimed series of the essays on the European politics, as well as the place of a Russian in Europe ("Tourists as Such and the Russian Ones, in Particular", "Russian Voice in the European Dissent", "The Peoples in History", "Notes of a Russian in Paris"). He greeted the Emancipation reform of 1861 and wrote several articles on it, mostly in Nashe Vremya newspaper, which soon led to his rift with Hertzen.

In summer 1865 Melgunov's health deteriorated, and he returned to Russia. He died in Moscow on 16 February 1867.
