= Vasily Kelsiyev =

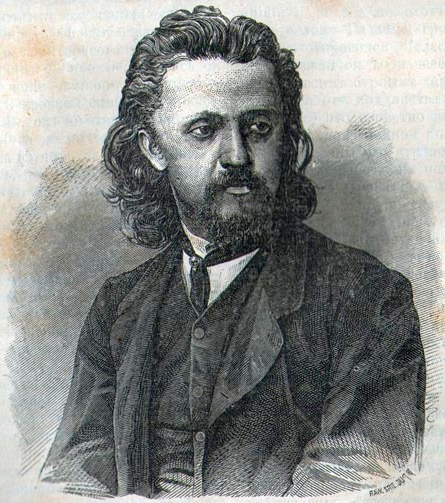
- 1860s engraving from the Pushkin House collection
- Born: Vasily Ivanovich Kelsiyev; Василий Иванович Кельсиев; June 28, 1835; Saint Petersburg, Russian Empire
- Died: October 16, 1872 (aged 37); Saint Petersburg, Russian Empire
- Occupations: journalist, historian, translator, political activist

Vasily Ivanovich Kelsiyev (Russian: Васи́лий Ива́нович Ке́льсиев; 28 June 1835 — 16 October 1872) was a Russian journalist, ethnographer. historian, translator and political activist, close associate of Alexander Hertzen in the early 1860s.

As a political immigrant in London, Kelsiyev became involved with Free Russian Press, and contributed to Kolokol, promoting, among others, the idea of supporting the Old Believers as a potentially destructive revolutionary force in Russia. In 1862 with Nikolai Ogaryov he co-founded Obshcheye Veche, a newspaper which he edited for a short while.

His two London-published books, The Russian Government's Documents on the Old Believers (1860—1862, in 4 volumes) and The Collected Russian Government's Regulations on the Old Believers (1863, in 2 volumes) were met with interest back in his homeland and received at least one favourable review, by the conservative Russky Vestnik. Among Kelsiyev's more bizarre projects was his translation of the Bible, which he published in 1860, "[with the view], apparently, of bringing down what hundreds of millions see as a sacred Word of God, to the level of easy, controversial read," according to another Russky Vestnik review.

In 1862 Kelsiyev illegally visited Russia to spend five week in the country among the revolutionaries and conspirators. In the course of the so-called Process of the 32 in 1863 he was convicted (in absentia) to lifelong exile. In Tulcea (then Turkey), he founded the Russian Socialist settlement but in 1867, having lost his family to cholera, returned to Russia, disillusioned and broke. He surrendered to the authorities and wrote his "Confessions" (without giving away any names of his former revolutionary associates). The document impressed Tsar Alexander II enough to pardon Kelsiyev.

In his later life Kelsiev contributed mostly to the conservative press (Russky Vestnik, Zarya, Vsemirny Trud, Niva) and in 1868 published his confessions under the title Perezhitoye i peredumannoye (Things I've Lived Through and Thought a Lot About), denounced by the left and praised by the right.

Hertzen, who dedicated a chapter in his My Past and Thoughts to Kelsiyev, characterized him as a "religiously-minded nihilist" who "studied everything but learned nothing" and, "through his tireless struggle against all things conventional... succeeded only in undermining his own moral ground."
