= Nikolai Berg =

- Никола́й Васи́льевич Берг
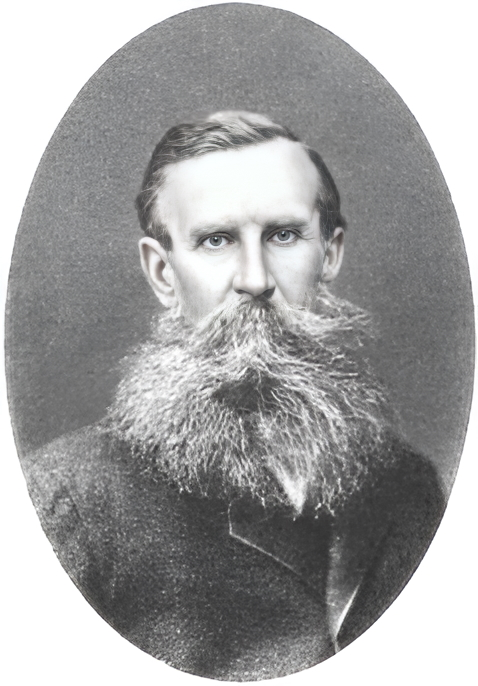
- Born: 5 April 1823; Moscow, Russian Empire
- Died: 28 June 1884 (aged 61); Warsaw, Poland
- Writing career
- Genres: Poetry, translations, historical essays, memoirs

Nikolai Vasilyevich Berg (Russian: Никола́й Васи́льевич Берг; April 5 [O.S. March 24] 1823 – June 28 [O.S. June 16] 1884) was a Russian poet, journalist, translator and historian.

== Biography ==
Nikolai Berg was born in Moscow. His father came from an old noble Livonian family. Nikolai studied first at the Tomsk regional college, then (in 1834–1838) at the Tambov and Moscow gymnasiums. In 1844 he enrolled into the Philological faculty of Moscow University but left an after a year.

In the early 1850s he joined the 'young faction' of Moskvityanin and, along with Boris Almazov, Evgeny Edelson, Lev Mei, Terty Filippov, and Apollon Grigoriev, became a member of what came to be known as the Ostrovsky circle. In 1853 he went to Sevastopol as a correspondent, and stayed there until the end of the siege, working as a translator at the headquarters of the Commander-in-Chief. He later published Notes on the Siege of Sevastopol (Moscow, 1858) and the Sevastopol Album, a collection of 37 drawings.

After the Crimean War ended, Berg went to the Caucasus where he witnessed the capture and arrest of Imam Shamil. He then travelled to Italy as a correspondent of The Russian Messenger to report on the progress of Giuseppe Garibaldi's army. Berg spent 1860-1862 travelling through Syria, Palestine and Egypt. As the January Uprising in Poland began he went to Warsaw as a correspondent for the Saint Petersburg magazine Vedomosti and stayed there for the rest of his life, teaching Russian language and literature at Warsaw University beginning in 1868, then editing the newspaper The Warsaw Diary (Varshavsky Dnevnik) from 1874 to 1877.

His major work, Notes on Polish Conspiracies and Uprisings came out in an unabridged version in 4 volumes in Poznań in 1884. In Russia, published in fragments in Russkiy Arkhiv (1870–1873) and Russkaya Starina (1879), it was banned. While in Poland Berg translated the works of Adam Mickiewicz (including Pan Tadeusz), and the works of poets from Bulgaria, Serbia, Slovakia, and Lithuania. Twelve of his Lithuanian Songs, originally included in the 1854 anthology Songs of Different Peoples, published in Moscow, came out in Vilno in 1921 as a separate edition.
