= Natalie Herzen =

Russian writer (1844–1931)

- Наталья Герцен
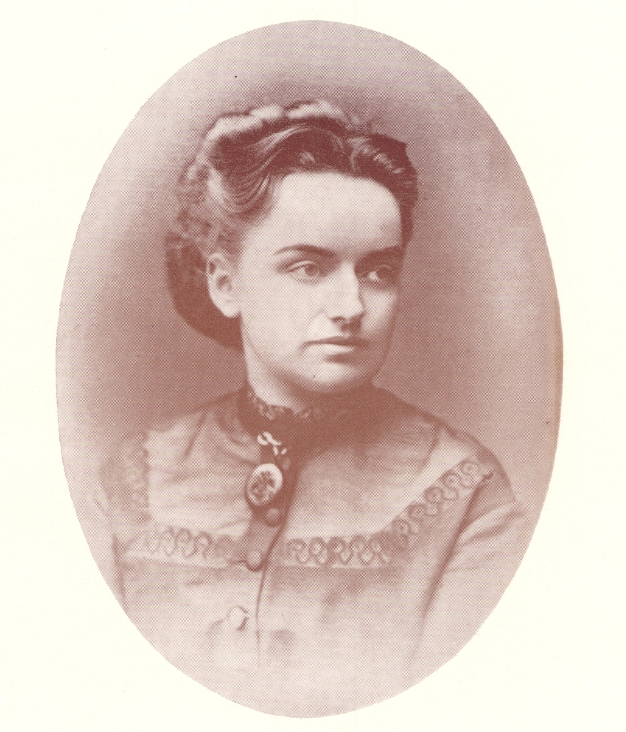
- Portrait, 1871
- Born: 14 December 1844
- Died: 1931 (aged 86–87)
- Other names: Tata
- Occupation: Editor
- Parents: Alexander Herzen (father); Natalia Herzen (mother)

Natalie Aleksandrovna Herzen (known as "Tata"; Russian: Наталья Александровна Герцен; 14 December 1844 – 1931) was an émigré Russian revolutionary, the daughter of Alexander Herzen and Natalia Herzen. After the death of her father, she took on co-editorship of Kolokol ("The Bell"), along with Nikolai Ogarev and Sergey Nechayev. She corresponded with many left-wing and radical figures, and her letters and diaries are important sources for historical research.

== Personal life ==
Suspicious of men who seemed to be interested in her for her fortune, she never married or had children, but was devoted to the children of her brother Sasha and sister Olga.
