= Free Russian Press =

Printing company in London

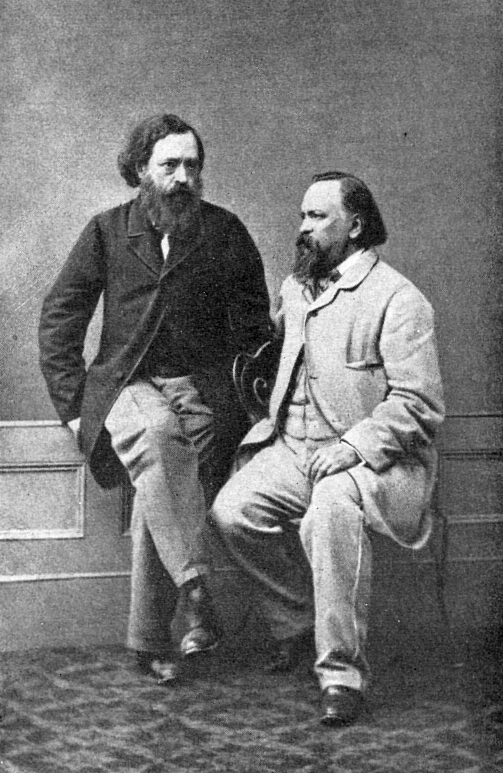
Nikolai Ogaryov and Alexander Hertzen

The Free Russian Press (Russian: Вольная русская типография, also: Вольная русская книгопечатня) was a printing company and a publishing house launched in 1853 in London by Alexander Hertzen with a view to becoming the 'uncensored voice of free Russia'.

== History ==
On 21 February 1853, Hertzen issued a statement, published under the title "Free Russian Press in London. For Brothers in Russia" in which he informed "all the free-thinking Russians" of the new publishing house with its own printing facilities to be opened on 1 May and promising 'free tribune to all'. "Send me whatever you will, and everything written in the spirit of freedom will be published, from the scientific articles or pieces on statistics and history, to novels, novellas or poems... If you haven't got anything of your own, sent hand-written copies of the banned poems by Pushkin, Ryleyev, Lermontov, Polezhayev or Pecherin... Since I am yet to maintain my links with Russia... I am going to publish my own manuscripts for a while," he informed his readership.

It took several months for Hertzen, assisted by a group of the Polish emigres to purchase all the necessary printing facilities, including the typeface, small, sharp and clear, produced by the French firm Famille Didot initially for the Saint Petersburg Academy of Sciences which for some reasons had rejected it. He established links with bookstores in London, Paris, Berlin, Leipzig and Hamburg and made the full use of the financial help provided by James Rothshield.

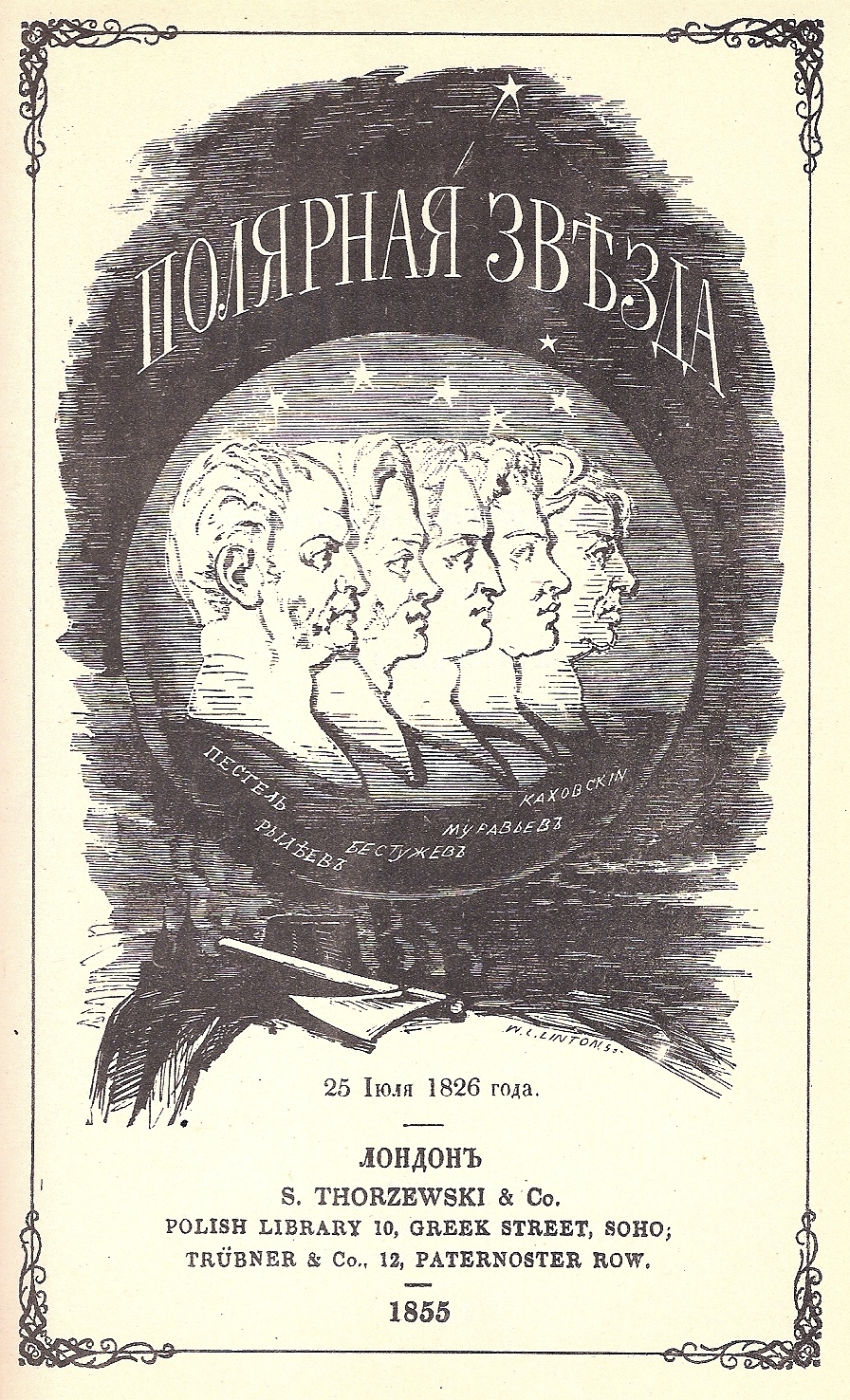
Polyarnaya Zvezda. 1855. In its title the paper honoured the Decembrists, and the cover of the first issue featured the profiles of the five leaders of the 1825 Revolt

The Free Russian Press was launched on 22 June 1853, the eve of the Crimean War. The first one to come out was a brochure titled "The Yuriev day! The Yuriev Day!", a call for the Russian nobility to awaken to the need of the liberation of Russian peasants. It was followed by "The Poles Forgive You!", a proclamation propagating the idea of the respective democratic communities in the two countries, Poland and Russia, joining forces to work together for the common revolutionary cause.

In August Hertzen's essay "Baptized Property" (Крещёная собственность) came out, attacking serfdom. Over the course of the next two years 15 leaflets and brochures were published, none of them containing a single word from an author or correspondent from Russia.

In August 1855 Alexander Hertzen started to publish his first periodical, Polyarnaya Zvezda (Polar Star), the first issue of it still comprising the materials from the immigrant circles. He made another plea for a response. "The question of whether or not you'll provide us your support is crucial. Your response will give us the idea about the ripeness of social awareness in Russia... Without articles from Russia, without the Russian readership, the Polar Star won't be having reason enough for its existence... Surely, your silence won't shatter our belief in the Russian people and its future; it will only make us doubt the moral strength and the real worth of our own generation [of Russians]." The second, May 1856 issue of the paper featured for the first time a letter from Russia, but 190 pages of its 288 were still written by Hertzen.

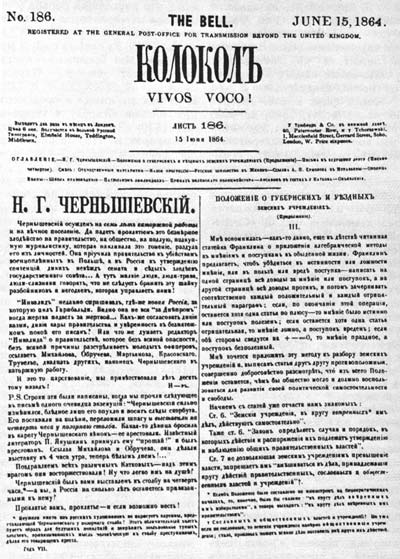
Kolokol, No. 186. 1864

1856 marked dramatic turn in fortunes for Free Russian Press. In April that year Nikolai Ogaryov arrived in London to join in with the enterprise. In the course of several weeks he managed to contact a large group of Russian authors, mostly belonging to the liberal intelligentsia. People like Konstantin Kavelin, Boris Chicherin and Nikolai Melgunov, who started to write to Hertzen, promptly gave him to understand that the only way for the publication out of quagmire would be to start addressing the widest possible range of the Russian readership, not just marginal radicals.

In July 1856 Hertzen and Ogaryov launched another periodical, Voices from Russia (Голоса из России), moderate in its tone and appeal, and having little in common with the blatantly pro-revolutionary Polar Star. All of a sudden a flood of material rushed in from Russia.

In March 1857 Hertzen and Ogaryov decided that they needed one more publication, the one that would be focusing more closely on current events. On 13 April the launch of a newspaper was announced, and on 22 June the first issue of Kolokol came out. Originally a supplement to the Polar Star, it quickly gained its own ground and became Hertzen and Ogaryov's major project.

In 1859—1861 the number of correspondents from Russia rose sharply. In its heyday Kolokol was a weekly, its circulation reaching 5 thousand, an average one hundred letters a month arriving at its London office.

The Free Russian Press published banned poems by Alexander Pushkin (including "The Ode to Liberty", "The Country", "Epistle to Siberia", and "To Chaadayev"), agitation songs by Kondraty Ryleyev and Alexander Bestuzhev, "Death of the Poet" by Mikhail Lermontov, some other work that had been until then circulating in hand-written form and would have been otherwise most certainly lost and forgotten.

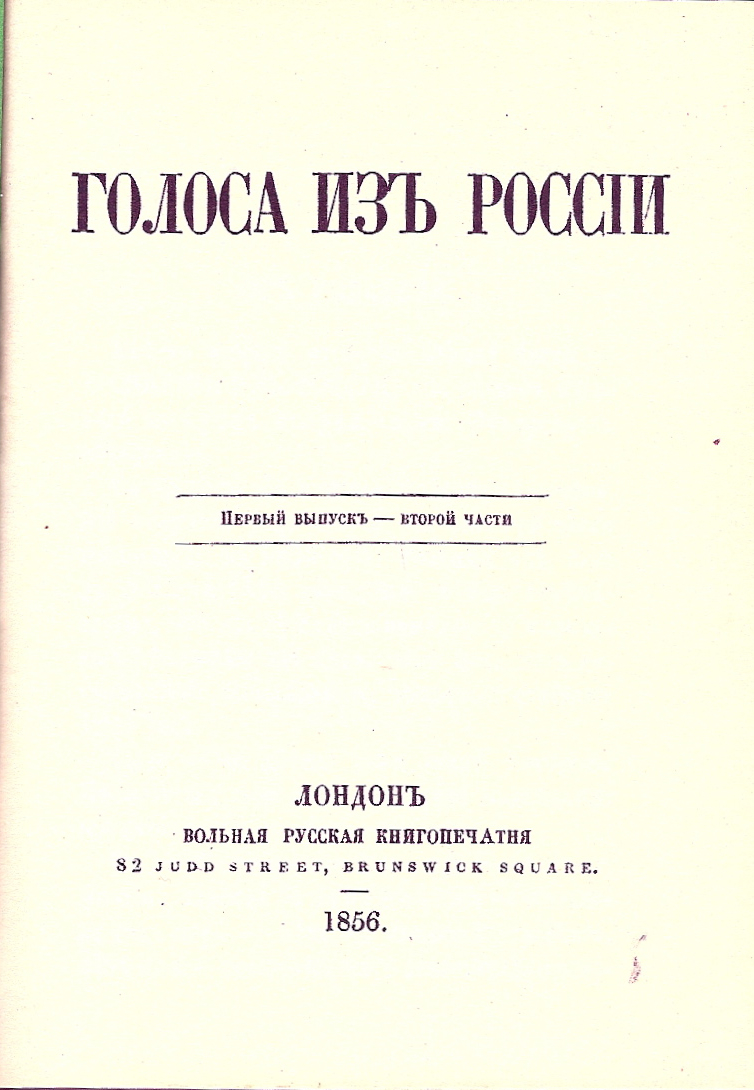
The title page of the Voices from Russia. 1856

It re-issued Alexander Radishchev's Journey from St. Petersburg to Moscow, as well as "The Thoughts" by Ryleyev, compiled a book called The Secret Russian Literature of the 19th Century (Русская потаённая литература XIX века), published numerous archive documents and fragments of diaries and memoirs of Russian state officials (to be compiled later in Istorichesky Sbornik, Historical Anthology), the assorted notes by the Decembrists, and the history of the 1825 Revolt, papers on the history of raskol and the Old Believers.

The sensational confession by Catherine the Great concerning the birth of Pavel I (whose father, as she asserted, had been not Peter III, but Prince Sergei Saltykov), the document which had been sealed and hidden even from the members of the Imperial family, was also published by the Free Russian Press, as well as the revealing memoirs of Princess Dashkova and the senator Ivan Lopukhin.

Even if the publications of the Free Russian Press were banned in Russia (as well as, due to the Russian government's pressure, in some parts of Europe, including Prussia and Saxony), many of them were making their way into Russia illegally, mainly through St. Petersburgh, Odessa, the Caucasian and the Chinese borders. Many of the FRP publications have been acquired by the Imperial Public library, some after having been confiscated on border, some, on special occasions, secretly purchased through the Russian Embassy in Berlin. They were being read by the Russian political elite too. "Tell Hertzen not to scold me or I'll stop subscribe to his paper," Alexander II once jokingly remarked, who was also said to have advised his ministers "in case of receiving the newspaper not to tell anybody put to keep it for private reading."

Secret correspondents included officials from the Foreign Ministry and the Holy Synod which resulted in several classified documents having been published by the Free Russian Press exclusively. The complete figures of the Russian state budget for years 1859 and 1860, which have never been made public back home, appeared exclusively in Kolokol.

Rumour had it that the first deputy of the foreign ministry Nikolay Milyutin had sent numerous secret documents to Hertzen. The author of the pamphlet aimed at the then Minister of Justice Count Viktor Panin, was said to be no lesser figure than Konstantin Pobedonostsev, the future Uber-Procurator of the Synod.

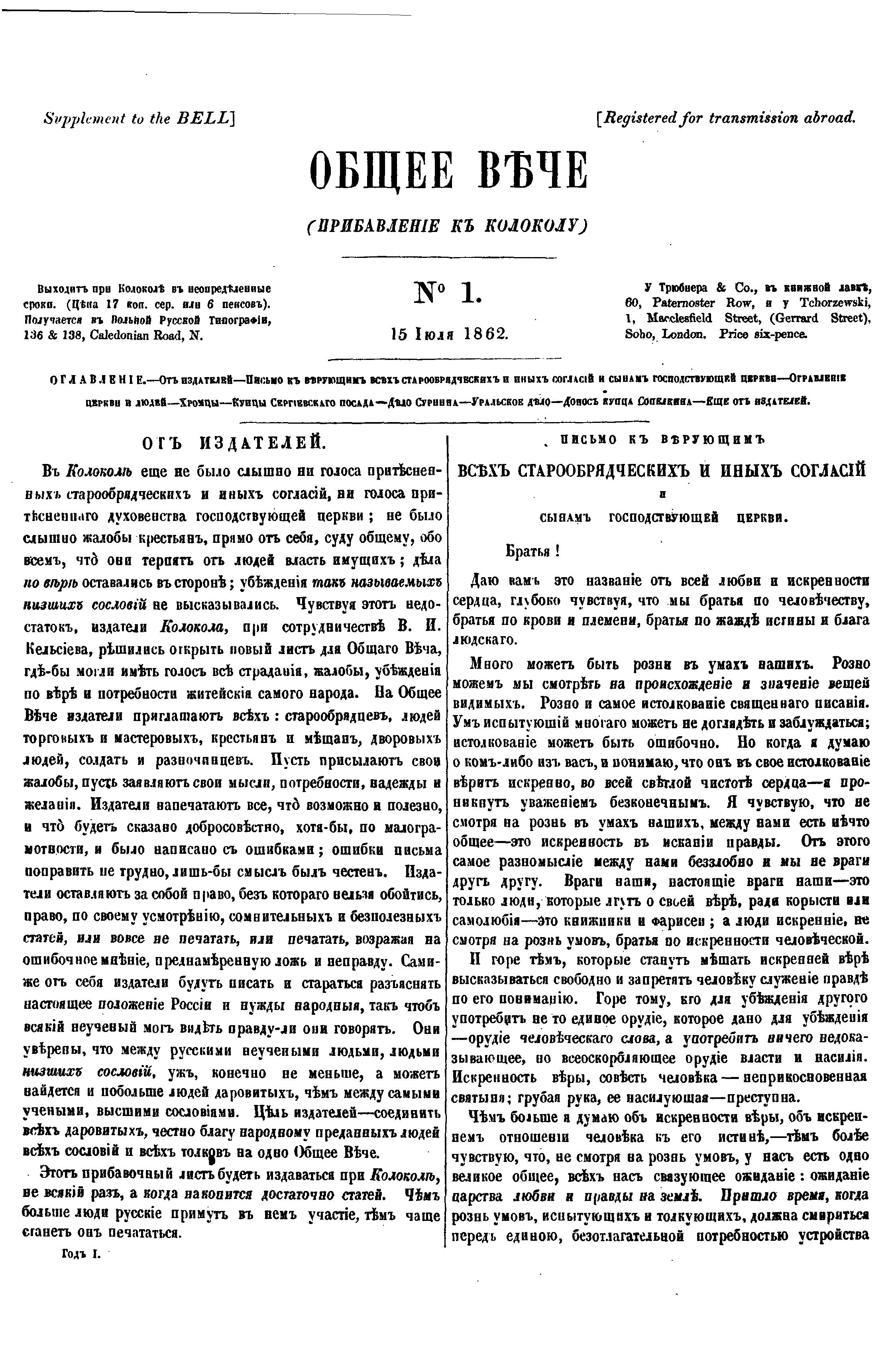
Obshcheye Veche, 15 July 1862. The first issue

In the years prior to the 1861 Emancipation Act the Free Russian Press succeeded in drawing Alexander II's attention to several alternative projects of the land reform, including the one by Valerian Panayev, which was published in Voices from Russia.

The early 1860s saw the Free Russian Press starting to lose its ground. For the new generation of revolutionaries in Russia it was not radical enough, some even saw it as 'half-legal'. With the ban on mentioning Hertzen's name having been by now lifted, sections of the Russian press went into open polemics with him. That Kolokol had become so important as to influence the Russian government's decisions, was now the fact.

On the other hand, a huge section of liberal readership turned away from Kolokol after the 1862 Petersburg arsons, reputedly committed by 'nihilists', nurtured by 'the ideas of Hertzen and Chernyshevsky', as the conservative press was quick to maintain.

In a desperate attempt to widen the range of its appeal the publishing house launched another paper, Obshcheye Veche (Common Council), written in simple language and aiming to cater for the semi-literate masses of Russians.

Then came the controversial decision by Hertzen to endorse the 1863 Polish January Uprising, and the curtain started to fall on the history of Free Russian Press. By the winter of that year the circulation of Kolokol dropped to 5 hundred. Russian abroad stopped visiting Hertzen in London.

In April 1865 Hertzen moved the Free Russian Press to Geneva and passed the ownership to the Polish emigre Ludvig Chernetsky, his closest associate, apart from Ogaryov, since 1853. For a while it looked like the crisis could be stalled but after the 1866 Dmitry Karakozov's assassination attempt and the repressive measures undertaken by the Russian government all ties that the FRP had maintained with Russia got severed. The last issue of Polar Star came out without any Russian correspondence at all. Kolokol tried to re-orient towards the European readership, and its several last issues came out in French.

In August 1867 the Free Russian Press was closed. Chernetsky launched the completely new publishing house under the same name which, without making any significant mark, went on for three more years and folded in 1870, soon after Hertzen's death.

== Addresses of Free Russian Press ==
=== London ===
- Judd street, 82; Brunswick Square
- Judd street, 2; Brunswick Square
- Thornhill Place, 5; Caledonian road
- Thornhill Place, 136 and 138; Caledonian Road
- Elmfield House, Teddington, Middlesex
- Jessamine Cottage, New Hampton, Middlesex

=== Geneva ===
- Pre l'Eveque, 40
- Place Bel-Air, Ancient Hotel des Postes
