= Boris Almazov =

Russian journalist and poet

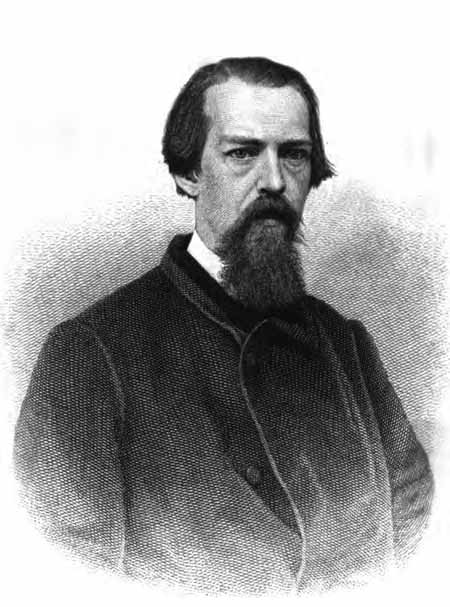
- Born: 11 November 1827; Vyazma, Smolensk Governorate, Russian Empire
- Died: 15 April 1876 (aged 48); Moscow, Russian Empire
- Spouse: S. Z. Voronina
- Writing career
- Pen name: Erast Blagonravov, B. Adamantov
- Genres: poetry, literary criticism, translations

Boris Nikolayevich Almazov (Russian: Бори́с Никола́евич Алма́зов, IPA: [bɐˈrʲis nʲɪkɐˈlajɪvʲɪtɕ ɐlˈmazəf]; 11 November [O.S. 27 October] 1827 – 15 April [O.S. 3 April] 1876) was a Russian poet, translator, writer and literary critic.

== Autobiography ==
Boris Almazov was born in Vyazma, Smolensk Governorate, to a retired military man coming from an old Moscow family. He received his primary education at home, in his parents' village of Karavayevo, where he spent most of his childhood.

In 1839 Almazov joined the First Moscow gymnasium, then was transferred to a boarding school. In 1848 he enrolled into the law faculty of Moscow University but failed to graduate due to financial difficulties.

In the early 1850s Almazov joined the young staff of the magazine Moskvityanin, alongside Alexander Ostrovsky, Apollon Grigoriev, Lev Mey, and started writing humorous sketches, under the pseudonym "Erast Blagonravov."

One of his pieces, "Dreaming of a Comedy," dealing with Sovremennik' negative review of Alexander Ostrovsky's It's a Family Affair-We'll Settle It Ourselves, had the heated exchange of insults between the two publications, as a result. Soon he changed his style of writing from frivolous to didactic and started to support the more traditional, type of prose.

In 1853 Almazov married S. Z. Voronina, whom he had tutored. The marriage proved to be a happy one, but the couple was dogged by financial troubles, for Voronina came from a poor family, and her husband was known to be an impractical man. Their affairs improved as in 1854 Almazov joined the Moscow educational chancellery, a position he held until 1861. In 1857 he began working in the Russian Synod's publishing office.

In 1859 Almazov contributed two essays ("On Pushkin's Poetry" and "A Review of Russian Literature, 1858") to the Utro (Morning) almanac, compiled by Mikhail Pogodin. Later scholars thought paradoxical the way their author, a self-professed proponent of the "art for art's sake" movement, criticized Afanasy Fet for "vagueness" and lauded Mikhail Saltykov-Schedrin's satires. Almazov's "personal tastes and sensibilities proved to be more democratic than the doctrines he tried to promote," a biographer wrote. Contemporaries apparently failed to appreciate this, and Nikolay Dobrolyubov in his review subjected Almazov's essays to severe chastising.

In the 1860s and 1870s, Almazov concentrated on writing and translating poetry, contributing mostly to The Russian Messenger (1861–1864, 1871–1872), Razvlecheniye (1859–1866), Iskra (1861–1862) and Zanoza (1863). Writing under the pseudonym "B. Adamantov", he enjoyed considerable success with his humorous verses, satirizing Russian police's interference in people's private lives, the inconsistencies of the liberals, and the advocates of serfdom. His philosophical and religious poetry, mostly in the vein of Schiller, his personal hero, was less popular, poems like "Rus and The West", "The Old Russian Party" and "To the Russian Tsar," were seen as typical for the Slavophile trend in the Russian poetry.

Best known Almazov's translation was his version of The Song of Roland (published in 1869 in Moscow, as Roland). He also translated Goethe, Schiller, and Chénier, as well as poetry of the Middle Ages.

In 1874 came out Poems, a comprehensive collection of Almazov's own poetic works. Critics ignored it, and long-time friend Alexey Pisemsky proved to be the only one who tried to promote the book. That was the year Almazov's wife died, the loss he suffered greatly from. His last piece, "Katenka", a novella in the natural school mode, came out in 1875. Heart-broken and destitute, Boris Almazov died on 11 November 1876, at the Sheremetiev's clinic in Moscow.
