= Yevgeny Edelson =

Russian literary critic, journalist, translator and philosopher

Yevgeny Nikolayevich Edelson
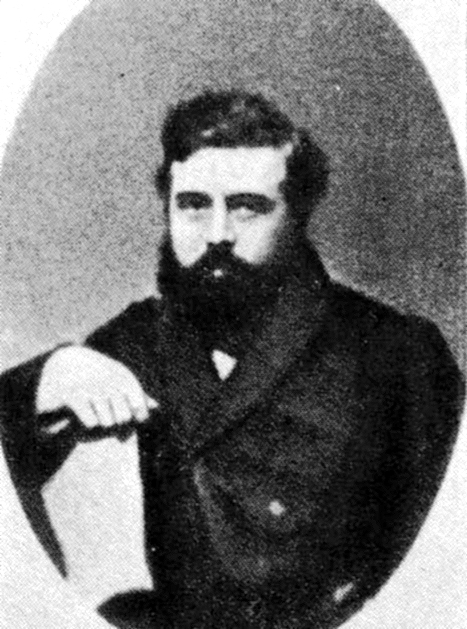
- Born: Евгений Николаевич Эдельсон; 12 October 1824; Ryazan, Russian Empire
- Died: 8 January 1868 (aged 43); Saint Petersburg, Russian Empire
- Occupations: literary critic, essayist, translator

Yevgeny Nikolayevich Edelson (Russian: Евгений Николаевич Эдельсон; 12 october 1824, Ryazan, Russian Empire, - January 8, 1868, Saint Petersburg, Russian Empire) was a Russian literary critic, journalist, translator and philosopher, best known for his critical and philosophical essays published in Moskvityanin (where he, along with Alexander Ostrovsky among others was part of the "young faction", formed by Mikhail Pogodin), Pyotr Boborykin-led Biblioteka Dlya Chteniya (there he headed the literary criticism department) and Vsemirny Trud. Highly acclaimed were his translation of Gotthold Lessing's Laocoön and "Shchedrin and the New Satirical Literature" (both published in 1859), the first comprehensive analytical survey of Russian literary satire of the mid-19th century.
