= Nikolai Pavlov =

Nikolai Pavlov may refer to:

- Mykola Pavlov (born 1954), Ukrainian footballer and coach
- Nikolai Pavlov (writer) (1803–1864), Russian writer
- Nikolai Vasilievich Pavlov (1893–1971), Russian botanist
