= Fyodor Miller =

Russian poet, novelist and translator

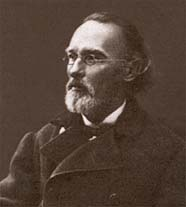
- Born: Фёдор Богданович Миллер; 3 February 1818; Moscow, Russian Empire
- Died: 1 February 1881 (aged 62); Moscow, Russian Empire
- Occupations: poet, writer, translator

Fyodor Bogdanovich Miller (Russian: Фёдор Богданович Миллер, 3 February 1818 — 1 February 1881) was a Russian poet, novelist and translator.

Fyodor Miller was born in Moscow, to a family of ethnic Germans. Originally a German (and later Russian) language and literature lecturer at the Moscow 1st Cadet Corps (where he taught in 1841-1869), Miller as a poet started out in the early 1850s with a series patriotic Crimean War-themed poems.

In 1859 Miller founded Razvlechenye, the first ever humorous illustrated weekly in Russia, which he remained the editor of up until his death. Using the pseudonyms Giatsint Tyulpanov (Hyacinth Tulipman) and Zanoza (Splinter), he habitually criticized Russian nihilists and radical raznochintsy.

Miller authored one novel, Tsyganka (Gypsy Woman, 1838—1839), and translated the works by, among others, Friedrich Schiller, Adam Mickiewicz, Heinrich Heine, Joseph von Zedlitz, Heinrich Kruse, Samuel Coleridge and William Shakespeare.

Several of his poems have been set to music by the composers like Vladimir Sokolov and Alexander Dargomyzhsky. A six-volume edition of his selected works came out in Miller's lifetime (1872—1881).

Miller has left a large bulk of poetic legacy, but ironically, it was with the tiny children's verse "Out Went the Hare for a Walk" (Раз, два, три, четыре, пять — вышел зайчик погулять..., 1851) that he entered the pantheon of Russian classics. It became immensely popular and is now considered part of Russian folklore.

The philologist and folklorist Vsevolod Miller was his son.
