= Nashe Vremya =

Defunct literary and political newspaper based in Moscow

- Type: Daily (1860-1861) weekly (1862-1863)
- Publisher: Nikolai Pavlov
- Editor: Nikolai Pavlov
- Founded: 1860
- Ceased publication: 1863
- Headquarters: Moscow, Russian Empire

Nashe Vremya (Russian: Наше время, Our Time) was a literary and political newspaper published in 1860–1863 in Moscow by Nikolai Pavlov. It started out as a liberal weekly, then, after some talks that Pavlov had had with the then Minister of Interior Pyotr Valuyev (which involved the promise of the financial support, among other things), in early 1862 became a conservative daily, whose agenda was formulated in the January issue by Boris Chicherin in his article "Measure and Limits" (Мера и границы). The newspaper proclaimed itself to be the 'liberally conservative' publication aiming at guarding the interests of the Russian dvoryanstvo as "the only class where the fire of the enlightenment is being kept." Among the authors who contributed to Nashe Vremya regularly, were Nikolai Berg, Alexander Rotchev, Mikhail Pogodin, Fyodor Tyutchev.
