= My Past and Thoughts =

Autobiography by Alexander Herzen

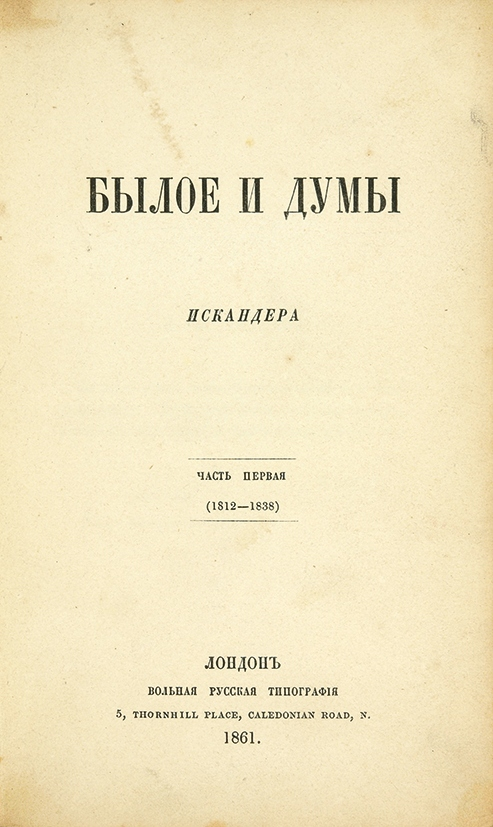
- Part 1, 1861
- Author: Alexander Herzen
- Original title: Былое и думы
- Language: Russian
- Publication date: 1870
- Publication place: Great Britain
- Media type: Print

My Past and Thoughts (Russian: Былое и думы, romanized: Byloje i dumy) is an extensive autobiography by Alexander Herzen, which he started in the early 1850s and continued to expand and revise throughout his later life. Serialized in Polyarnaya Zvezda, the book in its full form came out as a separate edition after its author's death. In Herzen's lifetime the major parts of the book were translated into English (1855), German (1855) and French (1860–1862). My Past and Thoughts gives a panoramic view on the social and political life in Russian Empire as well as the European West of the mid-19th century. It is considered to be the classic of Russian literature.

== Literary significance ==
Herzen's eloquence is easily translatable, for it is not based on the value of words and sounds, but on the unfolding of ideas and images... Though he cannot be regarded as a master of words, if "style is the man" Herzen is most undoubtedly a master of style. The same characteristics of his style, but in an even more un fettered and spontaneous form, still more like conversation and relatively free from rhetoric, recur in his autobiography, My Past and Thoughts. To the majority of readers it will ever remain his principal work. Its attraction lies above all in its freedom and obvious sincerity. Not that there is no pose in it - Herzen was too French and too romantic to do without a pose... The absence of self-conscious and exces sive sincerit, the superficiality, the somewhat matter-of-course theatricality of My Past and Thoughts is its essential charm to the open-minded reader. Apart from the tone of the voice there is little self in Herzen's memoirs and less introspection. The relative conventionality of his psychology makes it all the simpler and truer, for he speaks of himself in universal and accepted terms... But the greater part of the book is not subjective, and its most frequently memorable pages are those where he speaks of the outer world. Herzen is a great portrait-painter, an impressionist — and the impressions he left of his father and other relations, of the Moscow idealists, and of the leaders of the European Revolution are unforgettably vivid. His lightness of touch, which never insists and always moves on, gives them a wonderfully convincing mobility. Not the least remarkable passages of the book are those where he gives a wider historical background to the narrative: the first parts devoted to his life before his exile contain the broadest, truest, and most penetrating view of Russian social and cultural history in the first half of the nineteenth century. They are a great historical classic.

— D. S. Mirsky

Soviet critic Y. Elsberg calls the book "the novel about a Russian revolutionary and thinker" "with all the contradictions of his inner world" and writes that by its form My Past and Thoughts is a complex combination of memoirs, historical chronicle novel, diary, letters and a biography.

== Structure and publication ==
- Part I. Chapters 1-7. "Childhood and University (1812—1834)". Herzen's life in his father's house. First published in Polyarnaya Zvezda, 1856, Vol.2. The Supplement, "A. Polezhayev", first appeared in "Jail and Exile. From the Notes of Iskander ("Тюрьма и ссылка. Из записок Искандера"), London, 1854.
- Part II. Chapters 8-18. "Imprisonment and Exile (1834—1838)". The court case and deportation. "Imprisonment and Exile. From the Notes of Iskander ("Тюрьма и ссылка. Из записок Искандера"), London, 1854.
- Part III. Chapters 19-24. "Vladimir-on-Klyazma (1838—1839)". The story of his relationship with Natalya Zakharyina. Polyarnaya Zvezda, 1857, Vol.3
- Part IV. "Moscow, Petersburg and Novgorod (1840—1847)". On zapadnichestvo and slavyanofilstvo. Polyarnaya Zvezda: 1855 (Vol.1), 1858 (Vol.4), fragments in 1861 (Vol. 6) and 1862 (Vol. 7, part 2). Two chapters ("N.Kh. Ketcher" and "An 1844 Episode") were published posthumously.
- Part V. "Paris, Italy, Paris (1847—1852). Before and After the Revolution". Herzen's first years abroad. Polyarnaya Zvezda: 1855 (Vols. I, IV), 1859 (Vol. V). What the author called his "most cherished part" of the book, "The Story of a Family Drama" was published posthumously.
- Part VI. "England (1852—1864)". On his life in London after his wife's death. Originally published in fragments, in 1859-1869, in Kolokol and Polyarnaya Zvezda (n all, 5 chapters have been published in full in Herzen's lifetime).
- Part VII. "Russian Emigration". A set of sketches on Mikhail Bakunin, Vasily Kelsiyev and Vladimir Pecherin, among others. Published mostly posthumously ("The Posthumous Collection of A.I. Herzen's Work", Geneva, 1870).
- Part VIII. (1865—1868). On Herzen's European journeys. Polyarnaya Zvezda, 1869, Vol. VIII. (In some editions this is the final part of the book).
- Part IX. "Old Letters". Correspondence with Vissarion Belinsky, Pyotr Chaadayev, Timofey Granovsky and others.
