= Chamber of the deacon Andreyan Ratmanov =

- Палаты дьяка Андреяна Ратманова
- Interactive map of Chamber of the deacon Andreyan Ratmanov
- Location: Moscow, Bolshoy Kozlovskiy lane, house 13/17

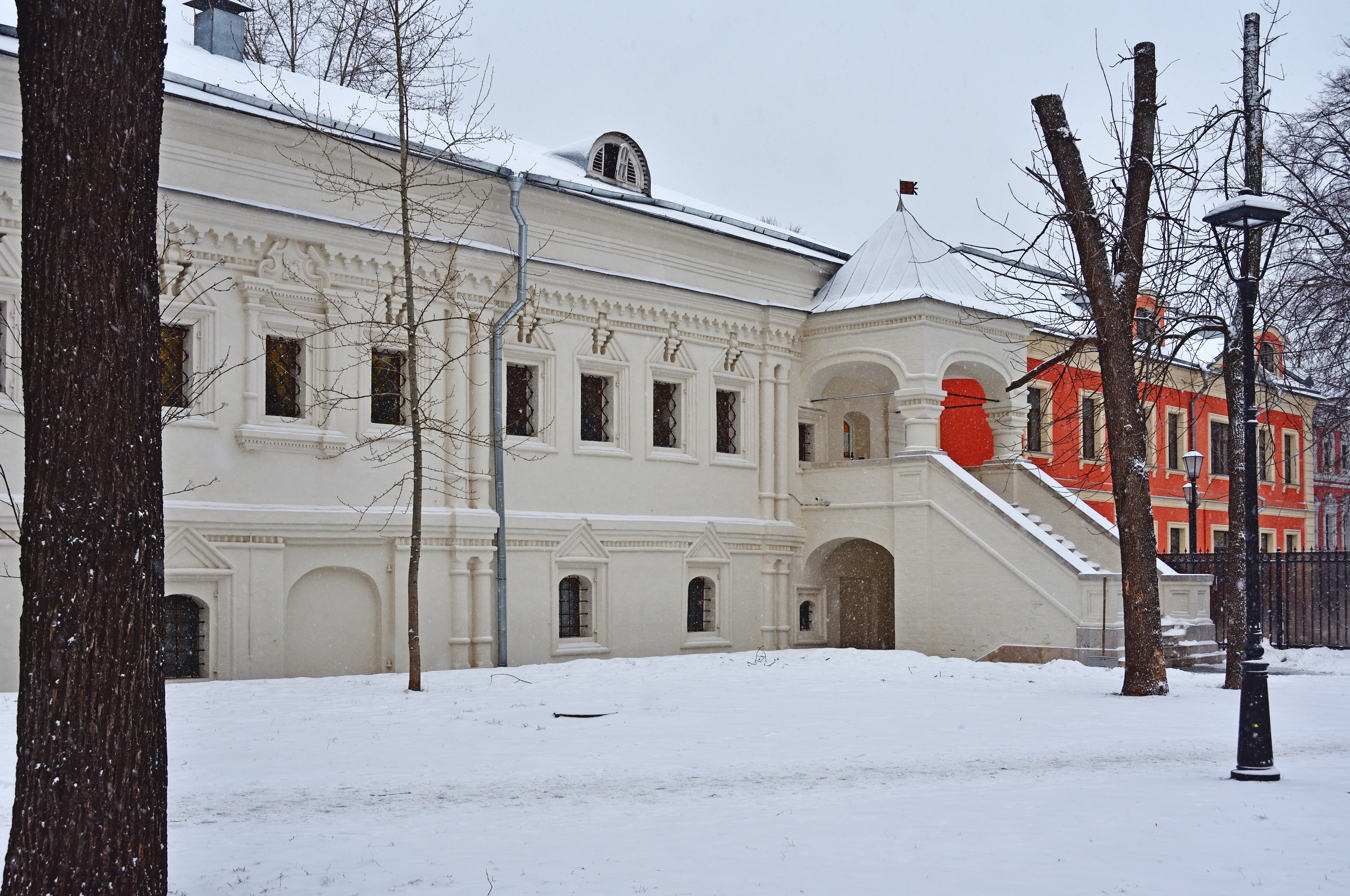
Moscow BKozlovskyLane13d17 009 2739

The chamber of the deacon Andreyan Ratmanov (Russian: Палаты дьяка Андреяна Ратманова) is a monument of pre-Petrine architecture in Moscow (Bolshoy Kozlovskiy lane, house 13/17). It was built in the late 17th century and rebuilt in the second half of the 18th century. They have the status of an object of cultural heritage of federal significance.

== History ==
The chambers of the clerk of the Local Order of Andrei Ratmanov were built at the end of the 17th century. In the second half of the 18th century, the chambers were rebuilt and assumed the appearance of a classical mansion with two outbuildings and a main house. At the end of the 18th century, the mansion belonged to I. B. Kozlovsky, in honor of which the neighboring Bolshoy and Maly Kozlovsky side streets were named.

From 1800 to the 1830s the mansion belonged to Vasily Alexandrovich Sukhovo-Kobylin, the hero of the Patriotic War of 1812. His children grew up in the mansion: the playwright Alexander Vasilyevich Sukhovo-Kobylin, the artist Sofya Vasilyevna Sukhovo-Kobylina and the writer Elizaveta Vasilyevna Sukhovo-Kobylina (Evgeniya Tur). There lived a teacher of Sukhovo-Kobylin's children, a professor at Moscow University Fedor Moroshkin. With another teacher, Professor Nikolai Nadezhdin, Elizabeth Sukhovo-Kobylina developed romantic relationships, but her parents prevented the wedding.

In the 1960s it was discovered that the façade of the mansion hides the chambers of the 17th century. After this, the restoration of the original appearance of the chambers began, and a porch was added. Now the chambers differ from the later parts of the mansion as architecture, and a lighter color. The building houses the non-profit foundation "Pushkin Library".
