= Razvlecheniye =

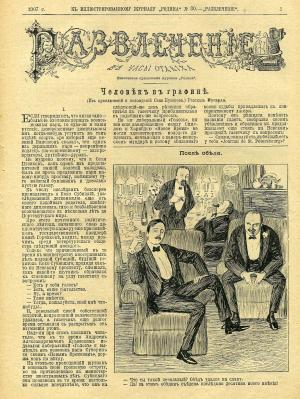
- A 1907 issue
- Editor: Fyodor Miller
- Frequency: Weekly
- Founded: 1859
- Final issue: 1916
- Country: Russian Empire
- Based in: Moscow
- Language: Russian

Razvlecheniye (Russian: Развлечение, Amusement) was a Russian illustrated weekly magazine published in Moscow in 1859–1916. Launched and (up until 1881) edited by Fyodor Miller, it specialized in humour and caricatures, but also contained a large and popular literary section. Among its regular contributors were Boris Almazov, Vladimir Dal, Alexander Levitov, Dmitry Minayev, and (caricaturist) Lavr Belyankin. Three Anton Chekhov's early stories first appeared in Razvlecheniye in 1883–1884.
