= Teleskop =

Russian literary magazine (1831–1836)

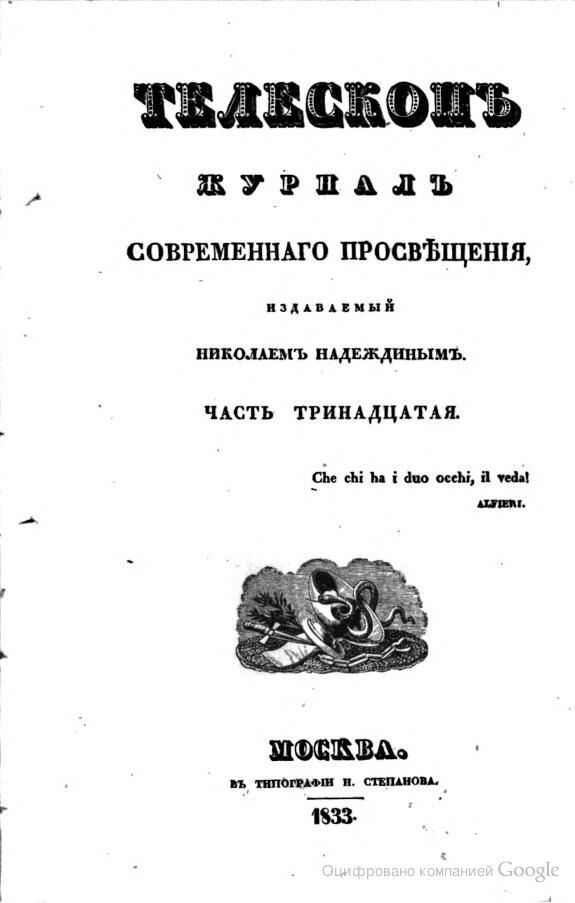
- The 1833 edition cover
- Editor: Nikolai Nadezhdin
- Frequency: Fortnightly (1831–1834); Weekly (1834–1835)
- Founded: 1831
- Final issue: 1836
- Based in: Moscow, Russian Empire
- Language: Russian

Teleskop (Russian: Телескоп) was a Russian literary, philosophical and political magazine published in Moscow in 1831–1836 by Nikolai Nadezhdin, who was also its editor-in-chief. Originally a fortnightly publication, it became a weekly in 1834. Another Nadezhin's project, Molva (Молва, Rumour, 1831–1986), originally a 'news and fashion' magazine, in 1932 became a newspaper and literary supplement to Teleskop.

Among the authors whose works appeared in Teleskop regularly, were Mikhail Pogodin, Stepan Shevyryov, Alexander Pushkin, Fyodor Tyutchev, Alexander Polezhayev, Nikolai Stankevich and Alexey Koltsov. Vissarion Belinsky joined in 1833 to become a year later Nadezhdin's co-editor.

In 1836 the magazine published Pyotr Chaadaev's "Philosophical Letter" and was promptly closed, as was Molva.
