= Nikolai Pavlov (writer) =

Russian writer, dramatist, translator, publisher and editor

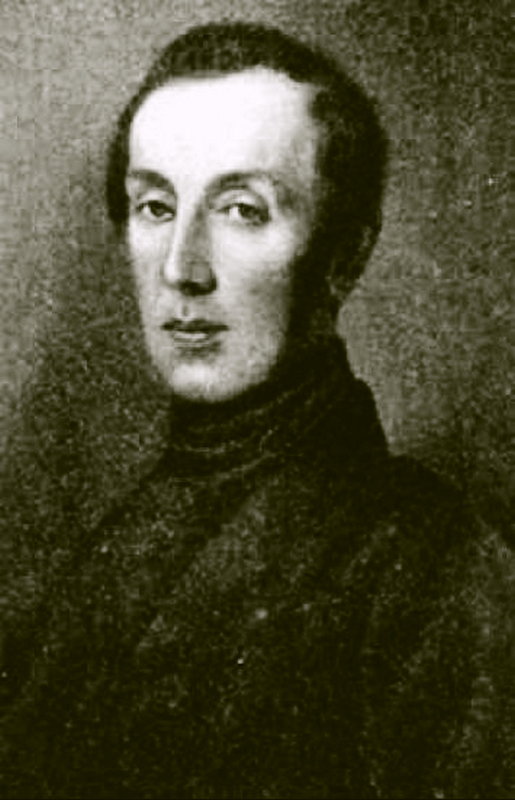
- Born: Nikolai Filippovich Pavlov; Николай Филиппович Павлов; 19 September 1803; Moscow, Imperial Russia
- Died: 10 April 1864 (aged 60); Moscow, Imperial Russia
- Occupations: writer, critic, editor
- Years active: 1822–1860s
- Spouse: Karolina Pavlova

Nikolai Filippovich Pavlov (Russian: Николай Филиппович Павлов, 19 September 1803, — 10 April 1864) was a Russian writer, dramatist, translator, publisher and editor.

== Biography ==
The Moscow University alumnus (1822–1825), he started his literary career in early 1820s, initially translating plays for theatre (none of which have been published). After having debuted as a published author in 1822 with a fable called "Sequins", he started to regularly contribute poems to the Moscow almanacs and magazines, Mnemozina, Moskovski Vestnik, Moskovski Telegraf, and later, Teleskop, Molva and Russky Vestnik.

Pavlov's best-known book of prose, Tri povesti (Three Novellas: "Yatagan", "Name Day" and "The Auction"), came out in 1835. Highlighting the problem of immense social injustice in Russia, it elicited high praise from, among others, Alexander Pushkin (who described it as "the first piece of Russian literature worth sacrificing your supper for"), Pyotr Chaadayev and Vissarion Belinsky. One influential detractor proved to be Tsar Nicholas I, who banned Three Novellas from being re-issued, for its "ideas and aims [being] quite horrible" and in his written resolution ominously hinted that "this author would do much better using his talent for describing the nature of the Caucasus." Pavlov's second book, Novyie povesti (New Novellas, Новые повести; "Masquarade", "The Demon" and "A Million") came out in 1839, and passed unnoticed.

In the 1830s Pavlov continued to translate from French, German and English. The works by Honoré de Balzac first published in Russian were translationed by Pavlov. He authored several vaudevilles, numerous essays and critical articles, as well as the book On the Sources and the Forms of the Russian Fable-writing (Об источниках и формах русского баснословия, 1859). The next piece of writing that (according to the literary historian Leonid Krupchanov) "made the whole of educated Russia talk about it" was his set of Four Letters to N.V. Gogol, published originally by Moskovskiye Vedomosti (Nos. 28, 38 and 46, 1847), criticizing the "Selected Passages from Correspondence with Friends" which shocked many people with the new tone of religious righteousness and didacticism the great writer had adopted in it.

In 1837 Pavlov married the poet and translator Karolina Jaenisch. For years the pair ran a popular literary salon in their Moscow house on the Rozhdestvensky Boulevard. Their marriage ended in 1853, when, having squandered away her inherited fortune by gambling, Pavlov was forced to declare bankruptcy and spent several months in jail. His house was searched by the police, some politically dangerous papers were found and he was exiled to Vyatka where he spent the next two years.

After the return Pavlov resumed writing and became a respected literary critic. Later in his life he published and edited the newspapers Nashe Vremya (1860–1863) and Russkiye Vedomosti (1863–1864). He died on 10 April 1864 in Moscow after prolonged illness and was interred in the Pyatnitskoye cemetery. The location of his grave since then has been lost. Pavlov's six novellas as well as the select poems, essays and correspondence were re-issued in 1985 by Sovetskaya Rossiya Publishers.
