= Nikolai Nadezhdin =

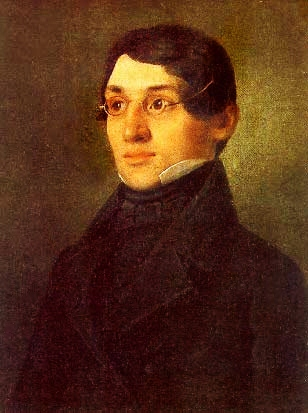
- Born: 17 October 1804; Beloomut, Ryazan Governorate, Imperial Russia
- Died: 23 January 1856 (aged 51); Saint Petersburg, Imperial Russia
- Occupation: Critic • ethnographer

Nikolai Ivanovich Nadezhdin (Russian: Николай Иванович Надеждин) (17 October [O.S. 5 October] 1804 – 23 January [O.S. 11 January] 1856) was a Russian literary critic and Russia's first ethnographer.

== Biography ==
Born in Beloomut, Ryazan Governorate, Nadezhdin graduated from Ryazan Seminary in 1815 and Moscow Religious Academy in 1824. From 1824 to 1826 he was a professor of literature and German at Ryazan Seminary, but he was expelled because of his interest in the classics and moved to Moscow, where he became a private tutor and began a career in literature. "Nadezhdin's conception of the classical age was itself romantic. Schelling was the new Plotinus, Napoleon the new Caesar, Schiller the new Vergil; and the implication was clear that the Russians were the new Christians. Nadezhdin had read Gibbon's Decline and Fall of the Roman Empire; and, in his lectures at Moscow University in the early thirties, he likened Russia to a new band of barbaric hordes swarming over the collapsing West."

"Nadezhdin was an ally of the Pushkin crowd who was also completely committed to the apparently antithetical principles of personal criticism, personal attacks, and personae. Starting with his work in the late 1820s in the Herald of Europe and moving on to his editorship of both Telescope and its companion publication, Rumor, Nadezhdin made his critical name not as Nadezhdin but as the "Ex-Student Nikodim Nadoumko," resident of Patriarch's Ponds," according to Melissa Frazier.

D.S. Mirsky wrote:

...He began his career by publishing a series of scurrilous, though at times witty, articles against the Poets... He attacked Russian romanticism from the point of view of Schelling's German romantic idealism, denying all ideological significance to the Russian pseudo-romanticism... In a thesis on romantic poetry submitted to the University of Moscow in 1830 he advocated a synthesis of classicism and romanticism. In 1831 he started a monthly magazine, the Telescope, where he continued his policy of belittling in the light of philosophical standards the achievement of Russian literature. In 1836 the magazine was suppressed for publishing Chaadaev's Philosophical Letter. Nadézhdin himself was exiled to the North and not till some time afterwards allowed to return to Moscow. After that he renounced literature and devoted himself exclusively to his archæological and geographical studies.

In 1845 he participated in a secret commission set up by Tsar Nicholas I dealing with heretical currents in Russia. He contributed the volume concerning the Skoptsy. He depicts his subject matter as a dangerous brotherhood threatening to overthrow the Tsar.
