= Vsemirny Trud =

- Editor: Emmanuel Khan (1867-1871); Stanislav Okreyts (1871-1872)
- Frequency: Monthly
- First issue: 1867
- Final issue: 1872
- Based in: Saint Petersburg, Russian Empire
- Language: Russian

Vsemirny Trud (Russian: Всемирный труд, translated as World Labour) was a Russian science and literary monthly magazine published in Saint Petersburg in 1867–1872, with the average of 1500 subscribers. Its original publisher and editor-in-chief was Emmanuel Khan. Not long before the journal's closure, Stanislav Okreyts became its publisher and editor. In 1869 a literary supplement for it, Domashnyaya Biblioteka (Домашняя библиотека, Home Reading), was started. Among the authors whose work were published by Vsemirny Trud were Alexander Ostrovsky, Alexey Pisemsky, Pyotr Boborykin, Dmitry Averkiyev, Vasily Avenarius, Ivan Lazhechnikov, Vsevolod Krestovsky, Ivan Gensler, Daniil Mordovtsev, Alexander Milyukov, Mikhail Zagulyayev, Nikolai Solovyov, Nikolai Akhsharumov, Pyotr Petrov, Sergey Shubinsky, Vasily Kelsiyev.

On 29 June 1872 the magazine received a six-month suspension and after that never re-opened.
