= Lev Mei =

Russian dramatist and poet (1822–1862)

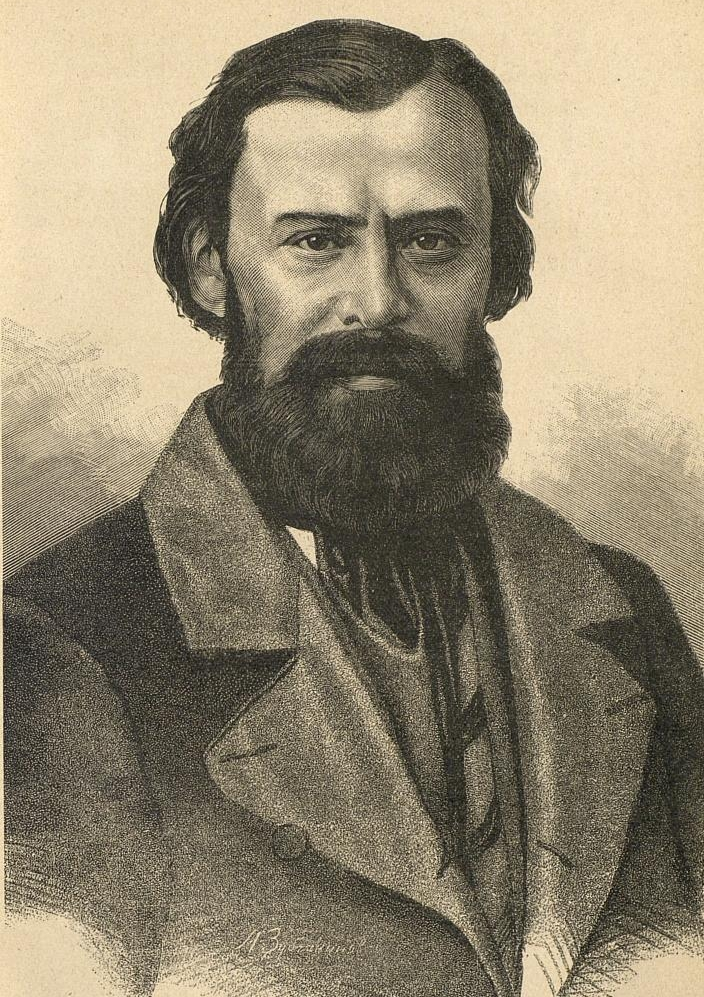
- Born: Lev Aleksandrovich Mei; 25 February 1822; Moscow, Russia
- Died: 28 May 1862 (aged 40); Saint Petersburg, Russia
- Occupations: Dramatist; poet

Signature
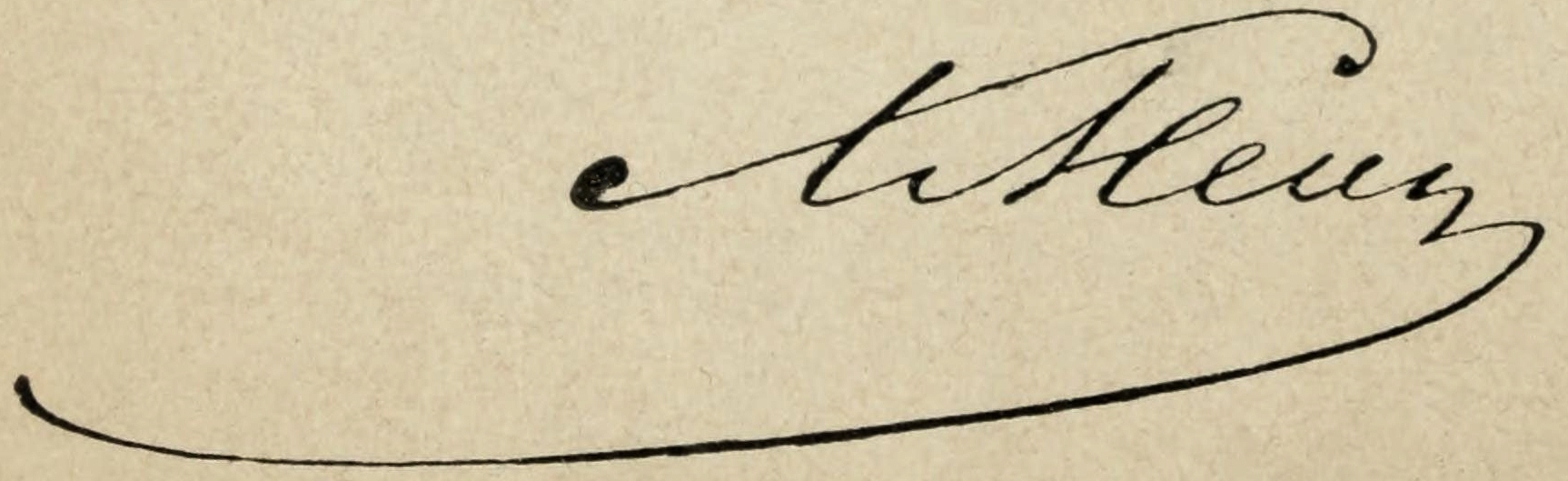

Lev Aleksandrovich Mei or Mey (Russian: Лев Александрович Мей; 25 February [O.S. 13 February] 1822 – 28 May [O.S. 16 May] 1862) was a Russian dramatist and poet.

== Biography ==
Mei was born on 25 February [O.S. 13 February] 1822, in Moscow. His father was a German officer who was wounded in the Battle of Borodino and died young. His mother was Russian. Mei completed his studies in Moscow in 1841 and served in the office of the Governor for 10 years. He became part of the "young editorial staff" of Mikhail Pogodin's Moskvityanin. For a time, he taught secondary school, but was forced to retire because of conflicts with his colleagues. He moved to Saint Petersburg, where he was active in literary endeavors. It was during this period that he contributed to the leading Russian magazines, including Biblioteka Dlya Chteniya, Otechestvennye Zapiski, Syn Otechestva, Russkoye Slovo, Russkiy Mir, and Svetoch.

Mei wrote the historical dramas, The Tsar's Bride (1849), Servilia (1854) and The Maid of Pskov (1859), all three of which the composer Rimsky-Korsakov later used as the basis for operas.

Mei lived a dissipated and bohemian life, with a great fondness for drink, which led to his untimely death on 16/28 May 1862.

== Sources ==
- Golub, Spencer. 1998. "Russia and the Republics of the Former Soviet Union." In The Cambridge Guide to Theatre. Ed. Martin Banham. Cambridge: Cambridge UP. 948–956. ISBN 0-521-43437-8.
