= Heinrich Kruse =

German dramatist and publicist (1815–1902)

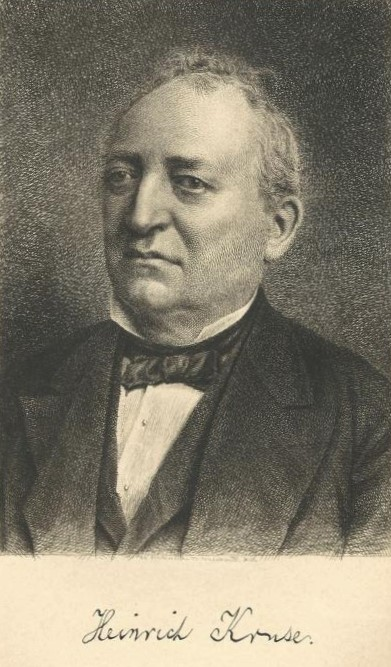
Heinrich Kruse by Johann Lindner, 1890

Heinrich Kruse (1815–1902) was a German dramatist and publicist.

== Biography ==
He was born at Stralsund, and studied philology at the universities of Bonn and Berlin. In 1847 he took up journalism, and in 1855 he became chief editor of the Kölnische Zeitung. He devoted himself, however, largely to writing plays.

== Works ==
Of his dramas the following are considered of great merit:

- Die Gräfin, a tragedy ("The Countess," 1868) This play was awarded a prize by the Berliner Schiller Commission.
- Brutus (1874–82)
- Das Mädchen von Byzanz ("The maid from Byzantium," 1877–85)
- Der Verbannte ("The banished one," 1879–81)

He also wrote sea stories and poems.
