= Alexei Potekhin =

Russian dramatist and novelist

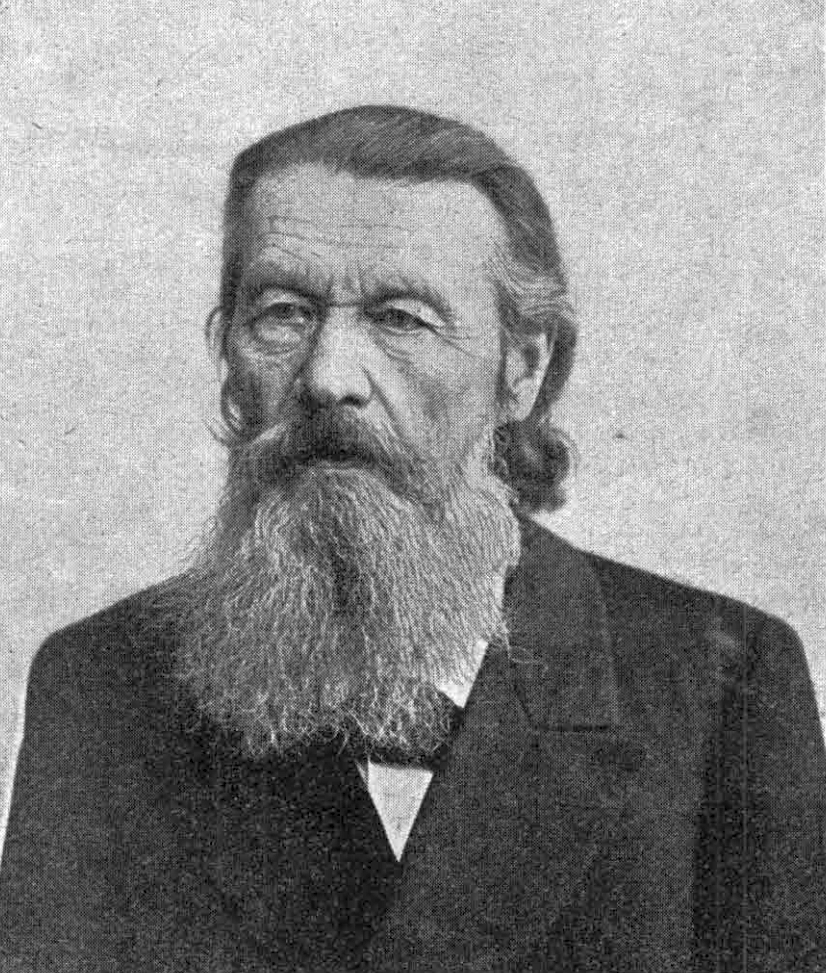
- 1901 photograph
- Born: 1829
- Died: 1908 (aged 78-79)
- Occupation: Dramatist
- Writing career
- Years active: 1853–1880

Alexei Antipovitch Potekhin (1829–1908) (Russian: Алексе́й Анти́пович Поте́хин) was a Russian dramatist and novelist.

== Biography ==
He was born at Kineshma, in Kostroma Governorate, studied at Jaroslav, and settled in Saint Petersburg. As a novelist he is a realist of much the same school as Pisemsky and especially able in his portrayal of dismal village life. His earlier plays were slow in getting to the stage, as they were blocked by the censors for their attacks on present conditions.

== Works ==
=== Plays ===
- The Voice of the People Not the Voice of God (1853)
- Ill-Gotten Gains Do Not Prosper (1854)
- Tinsel (1858)
- The Severed Limb (1865)
- A Vacant Place (1870)

=== Novels and tales of peasant life ===
- The Poor Nobles (1859)
- For Money, a story of factories
- The Sick Woman (1876)
- Under the Spell of Money (1876)
- Before the Community (1877)
- Young Inclinations (1879)
- Village Vampires (1880)
