= Kolokol (newspaper) =

Russian censorship-free weekly newspaper

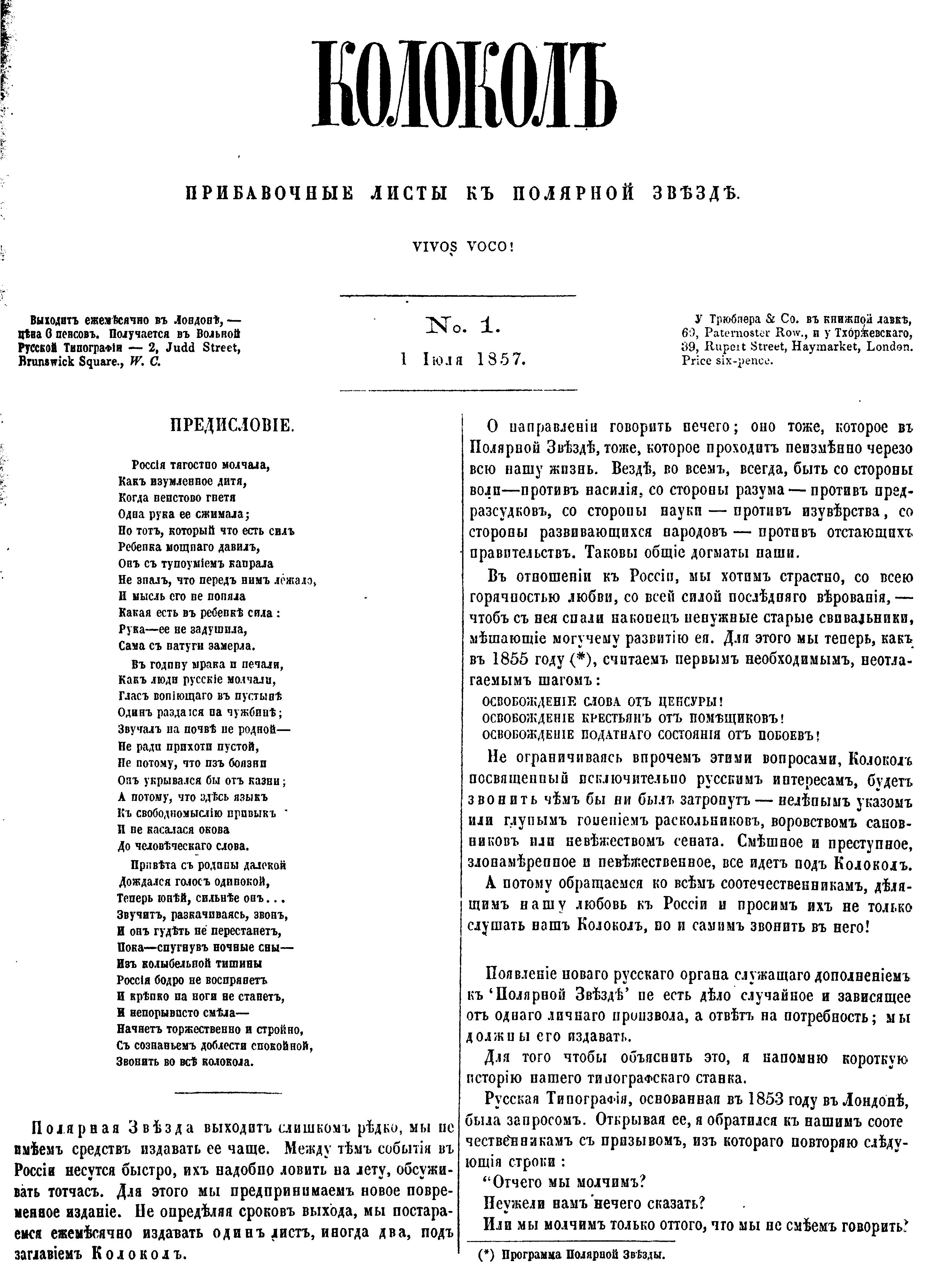
- The first page of the first issue of Kolokol
- Type: Weekly newspaper
- Publisher: Alexander Herzen and Nikolai Ogarev
- Founded: 1857
- Ceased publication: 1867
- Language: Russian
- City: London (1857–1865), Geneva (1865–1867)
- Country: England (1857–1865), Switzerland (1865–1867)
- OCLC number: 1366433960

Kolokol (Russian: Колоколъ, lit. 'bell') was the first Russian censorship-free weekly newspaper in the Russian language, published by Alexander Herzen and Nikolai Ogarev in London (1857–1865) and Geneva (1865–1867). It had a circulation of up to 2500 copies. Although banned in Russia, it was well known and had a significant influence on the reformist and revolutionary movements of the 1860s.

Initially the publishers viewed Kolokol as a supplement (прибавочные листы) to a literary and socio-political almanac, Polar Star, but it soon became the leader of the Russian censorship-free press. The newspapers Pod sud (To Trial; 1859–1862) and Obshcheye veche (General Veche; 1862–1864) were published as supplements to Kolokol.

At Kolokol's base was a theory of Russian peasant socialism, elaborated by Herzen. Its political platform included democratic demands for liberation of peasants with land, and abolition of censorship and corporal punishment. Besides the articles by Herzen and Ogaryov, Kolokol published a variety of material on people's living conditions, social struggle in Russia, and information about abuses and secret plans of the authorities. Nikolai Dobrolyubov, Nikolai Serno-Solovyovich, Mikhail Mikhailov, Nikolai Utin, Lev Mechnikov, Mikhail Elpidin and others were among the paper's correspondents and distributors. Writers and liberal figures such as Ivan Aksakov, Yuri Samarin, Alexander Koshelev, Ivan Turgenev and others delivered material for Kolokol.

After the Emancipation reform of 1861, Kolokol took the side of revolutionary democracy. The newspaper began publishing texts of proclamations, articles by Herzen and Ogaryov condemning and exposing problems with the reform, and other material from the Russian revolutionary underground. Kolokol favored the formation of a clandestine revolutionary organization Land and Liberty. After the 1861 reform, Kolokol lost most of its liberal readers due to Herzen's and Ogaryov's active support of the January Uprising in Poland.

In 1866, Dmitry Karakozov tried to assassinate Tsar Alexander II. Kolokol publicly condemned terrorism but continued to lose readers. In an open letter to Alexander II, Herzen admitted: "There were times when you read Kolokol - now you do not read it any more."

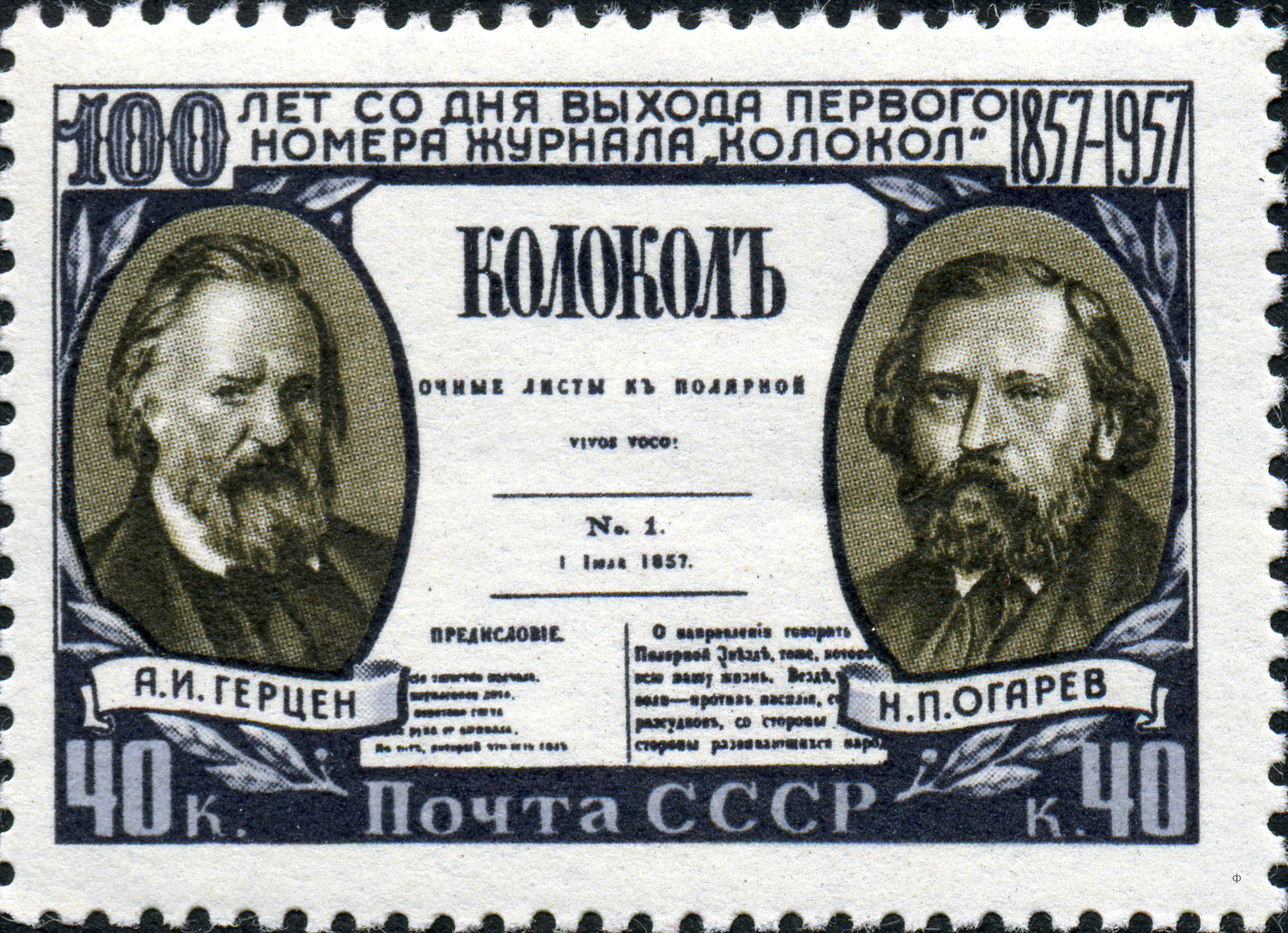
Kolokol commemorative postage stamp

In order to strengthen its ties with the new émigrés concentrated in Switzerland, Kolokol moved its office to Geneva. While retaining its previous orientation, it was now published in French as "Kolokol (La Cloche)" with the aim of introducing Russia to Western European readers. The publication was unpopular. Publication of Kolokol ceased in 1867 due to unfavorable conditions. In 1867–1869, they published Kolokol: A Supplement to the First Decade (Колокол. Прибавочный лист к первому десятилетию), six issues of Kolokol. Russian Edition (Колокол. Русское прибавление) and Supplement du Kolokol in French. In 1870, Ogaryov together with Sergey Nechayev and Natalie Herzen published six more issues of Kolokol, which differed significantly from Alexander Herzen's Kolokol.
