= Nikolay Ogarev =

Russian poet, historian and political activist (1813–1877)

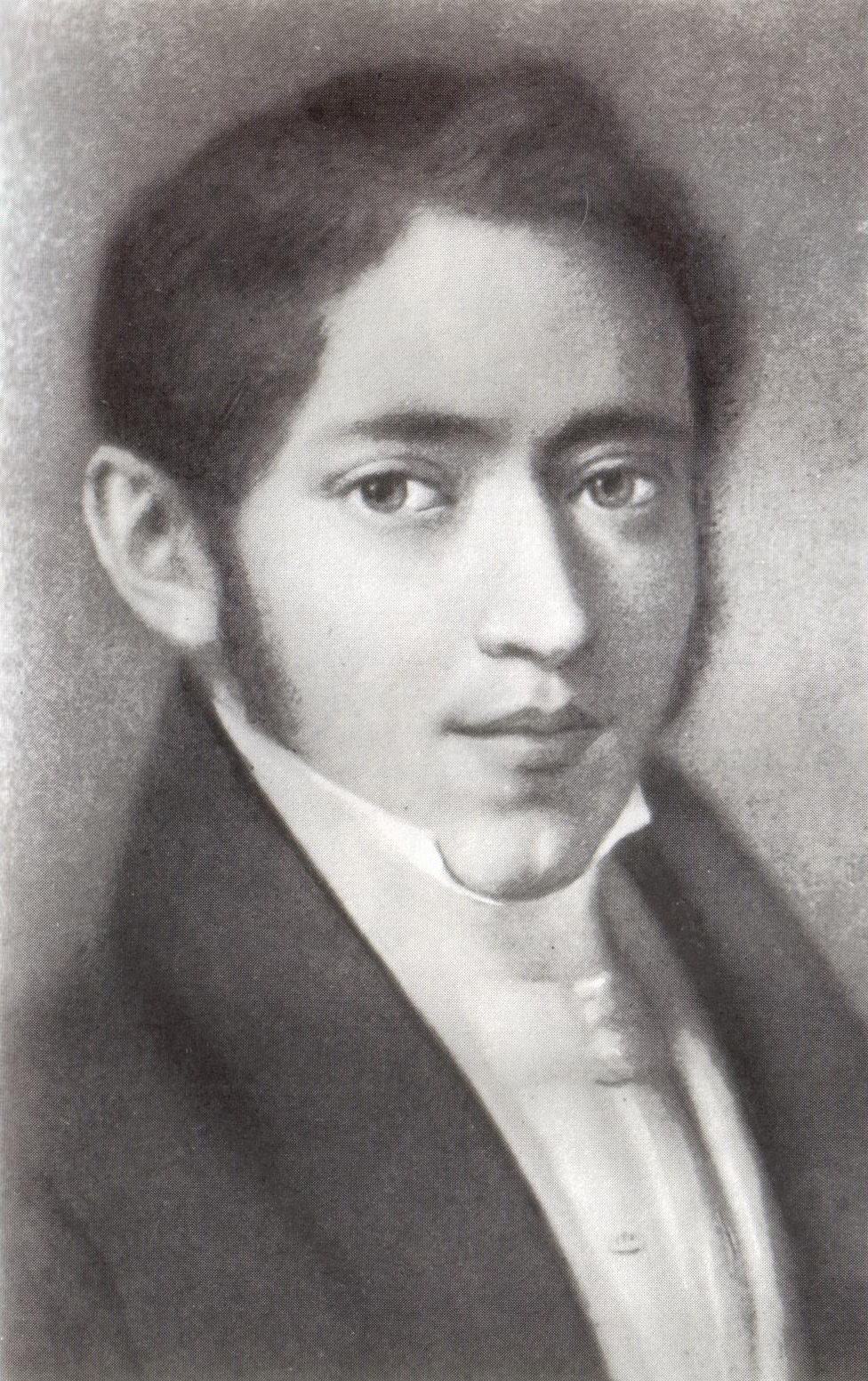
- Ogarev's portrait by an unknown painter, c. 1830.
- Born: Nikolay Platonovich Ogarev; December 6, 1813; Saint Petersburg, Russian Empire
- Died: June 12, 1877 (aged 63); Greenwich, England
- Occupations: Poet, historian and political activist

Nikolay Platonovich Ogarev (also Ogaryov; Russian: Николай Платонович Огарёв; 6 December [O.S. 24 November] 1813 – 12 June [O.S. 31 May] 1877) was a Russian poet, historian and political activist. He was deeply critical of the limitations of the Emancipation reform of 1861, claiming that the serfs were not set free, but had simply exchanged one form of serfdom for another.

Ogarev was a lifelong friend, fellow-exile and collaborator of Alexander Herzen on Kolokol, a newspaper printed in England and smuggled into Russia. In the summer of 1827, during a walk in the Sparrow Hills above Moscow, Herzen and Ogarev (both in their teens) made an oath not to rest until their country was free; the oath reportedly sustained them and their friends throughout many crises of their lives at home and abroad and was described in E. H. Carr's The Romantic Exiles. The place of the oath is now marked with a monument.

== Biography ==
Nikolay Ogaryov was born in Saint Petersburg into a family of wealthy Russian landowners. Having lost his mother early, Nikolay spent his childhood years in his father's estate near Penza. In 1826 he met and became a close friend of his distant relative Aleksandr Herzen, with whom he instantly found two things in common, the aversion to monarchy and deep empathy with the Decembrists' ideas. In 1829 he left the farm and went to study at the University of Moscow, where he developed a remarkable political work by joining a group of utopian socialists, resulting in his arrest and internal exile to his father's farm.

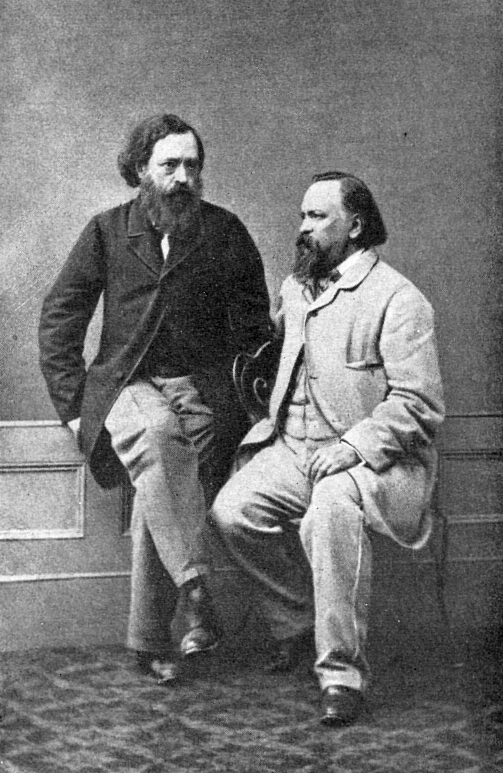
Ogarev and Herzen in exile

In 1856 he left Russia for good, living many years in London and Geneva, dedicated to the organization of free Russian print publication of The Bell and General Assembly. From October 1874, Ogaryov began living in Newcastle upon Tyne, where he arrived with his beloved Mary all the way from Genoa. While in Newcastle, Ogarev worked on his Confession in Verse and his unfinished work Last Curse. By the end of that year, however, the couple was living in Mary's hometown of Greenwich, where Ogarev died in 1877.

== Works ==
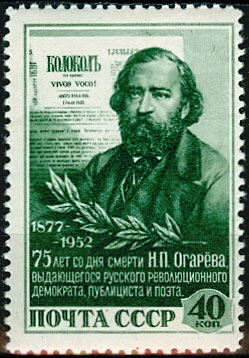
Ogarev honoured on a 1952 USSR stamp; an issue of Kolokol is depicted behind him

His poetry was marked in its first term by a romantic tone, dominated by the issues of freedom of the individual and the people, social protest, rebellion, loneliness, doubt and despair as in A Poet's Death (1837), dedicated to the death of Aleksandr Pushkin, Song (1839), and The Night (1839). The memory of the Russian Decembrists inspired In Memory of Ryleyev, (1859), I saw Them Coming From Far Away Regions (1838), and Beethoven's Heroic Symphony (1874). Between the 1840s and 1850s, he wrote several novels in verse such as The Village (1847), The One, Winter Road (1856), in which he describes the life of the rural gentry and the peasantry under the law of servitude. His time in London corresponds to the creation of Dreams (1857), The Night (1857), The Jail (1857), Matvei Radáyev (1856), all imbued with tones of pathetic patriotism. One of his favorite genres was the epistle, such as his To My Friend Herzen, To My Friends, and A. Granovsky. Another of his characteristic genres was his lyric poems in the form of monologue, such as Monologues, Meditation, and Confession of a Real Man.

His prose creations consist of a memoir titled My Confession, Themes from the Caucasus and Memoirs of a Russian Landowner, clearly influenced by the memories of his friend Herzen, plus some unfinished novels such as Sasha and History of a Prostitute, which can be framed within the narrative of Naturalism. As a literary critic, he is the author of several essays devoted to prominent figures in Russian culture and literature such as the preface to the edition of the poems of Kondraty Ryleyev in London in 1860, and the article Russian Literature of the Hidden Nineteenth Century. His complete works encompass four volumes. In 1966, his remains were disinterred from Greenwich Cemetery, cremated and the ashes taken to Russia and buried in the Novodevichy Cemetery in Moscow.
