= Stepan Shevyryov =

Russian poet and literary historian (1806–1864)

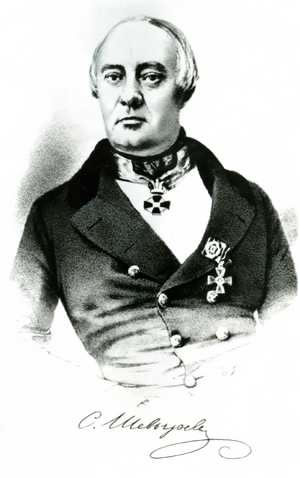
- Born: Stepan Petrovich Shevyryov; 30 October 1806; Saratov, Russia
- Died: 20 May 1864 (aged 57); Paris, France
- Occupations: Poet; philologist; critic

Stepan Petrovich Shevyryov (Russian: Степа́н Петро́вич Шевырёв, 30 October [O.S. 18 October] 1806 – 20 May [O.S. 8 May] 1864) was a conservative Russian literary historian and poet, a virulent critic of "the rotting West", and leading representative of the Official Nationality theory.

== Life ==
Young Shevyrev was enrolled in the Moscow archives of the Foreign Ministry where he came to know other "archive youths", as the Russian followers of Schelling were then known. His translations of German Romantic poetry won him respect in the literary circles. In 1829, Princess Zinaida Volkonskaya invited him to look after her young son in Italy. After returning to Russia four years later, Shevyrev published the first Russian study of Dante. Sergey Uvarov secured for him a professorship in Moscow.

In the late 1830s Shevyrev joined Mikhail Pogodin, the editor of Moskvityanin, in opposing Belinsky and his pro-Western colleagues. His later years were devoted to completing the bulky History of Russian Literature. Many of the letters collected in Gogol's Correspondence with Friends were addressed to Shevyrev.

At the beginning of Alexander II's liberal reign, Shevyrev was accused by Count Bobrinsky of being a pro-government (kvas) patriot. The elderly scholar "lost his temper and hit Bobrinsky in the face. Bobrinsky flew off the handle: he dashed at his opponent, knocked him to the floor, and began to trample him underfoot". Shevyrev (who had a rib broken in the scuffle) left Russia "in disgust", never to return again.

== Works ==
As a scholar, Shevyryov was best known for his studies of Old Russian religious texts (specifically, those held by the Vatican Library) and translations of Dante; he is regarded as Russia's first Danteologist. Shevyryov has also made an impact as an innovative poet who experimented with rhythms and structures. He is credited as being a founder of the so-called "poetry of thought" movement which defied Pushkin-set harmony in preference to more angular and rough, but intellectually deeper verse, of which Vladimir Benediktov and Nikolay Yazykov were seen as precursors.

== Assessment ==
Labeled a 'Russian nationalist' (and, by default, 'a reactionary') by influential radicals like Belinsky and Dobrolyubov, Stepan Shevyryov was forced to leave Russia in 1857. He died in Paris in 1864 and for half a century remained in oblivion. In 1930s the renewal interest in Shevyryov's legacy led to several publications, including a 1939 compilation of his poetry in 2 volumes. In 1962 the collection of professor Shevyryov's lectures was published in Moscow.

Modern critics are divided as to where Shevyryov’s poetic legacy belongs to. Some regard him as part of the Tyutchevian strand (alongside Fyodor Tyutchev, Fyodor Glinka and Aleksey Khomyakov among others), some see him and his "poetry of thought" invention as something that stands on its own and ahead of its time, akin more to formal experiments of the 20th-century Russian poetry.

== Select works ==
- History of Poetry (2 volumes, Moscow, 1835; Saint Petersburg, 1892).
- Theory of Poetry in its Historical Development, Old and New (Moscow, 1836)
- The History of Old Russian Literature (4 volumes, Moscow, 1846-1860).

== Sources ==
- "Шевырев, Степан Петрович" . Brockhaus and Efron Encyclopedic Dictionary (in Russian). 1906.
