= Alexander Herzen =

Russian author and revolutionary (1812–1870)

- Александр Герцен
- Portrait by Nikolai Ge, 1867
- Born: 6 April 1812; Moscow, Russian Empire
- Died: 21 January 1870 (aged 57); Paris, France
- Relatives: Peter Herzen (grandson)

Education
- Education: Moscow University

Philosophical work
- Era: 19th-century philosophy
- Region: Russian philosophy
- School: Westernizers; Agrarian populism
- Main interests: Politics, economics, class struggle
- Notable ideas: Agrarian socialism, advocacy of the obshchina (peasant commune) as the basis for socialism

Alexander Ivanovich Herzen (Russian: Александр Иванович Герцен, romanized: Aleksandr Ivanovich Gertsen; 6 April [O.S. 25 March] 1812 – 21 January [O.S. 9 January] 1870) was a Russian writer and thinker known as the precursor of Russian socialism and one of the main precursors of agrarian populism (being an ideological ancestor of the Narodniki, Socialist-Revolutionaries, Trudoviks and the agrarian American Populist Party). With his writings, many composed while exiled in London, he attempted to influence the situation in Russia, contributing to a political climate that led to the emancipation of the serfs in 1861. He published the important social novel Who is to Blame? (1845–46). His autobiography, My Past and Thoughts (written 1852–1870), is often considered one of the best examples of that genre in Russian literature.

== Life ==
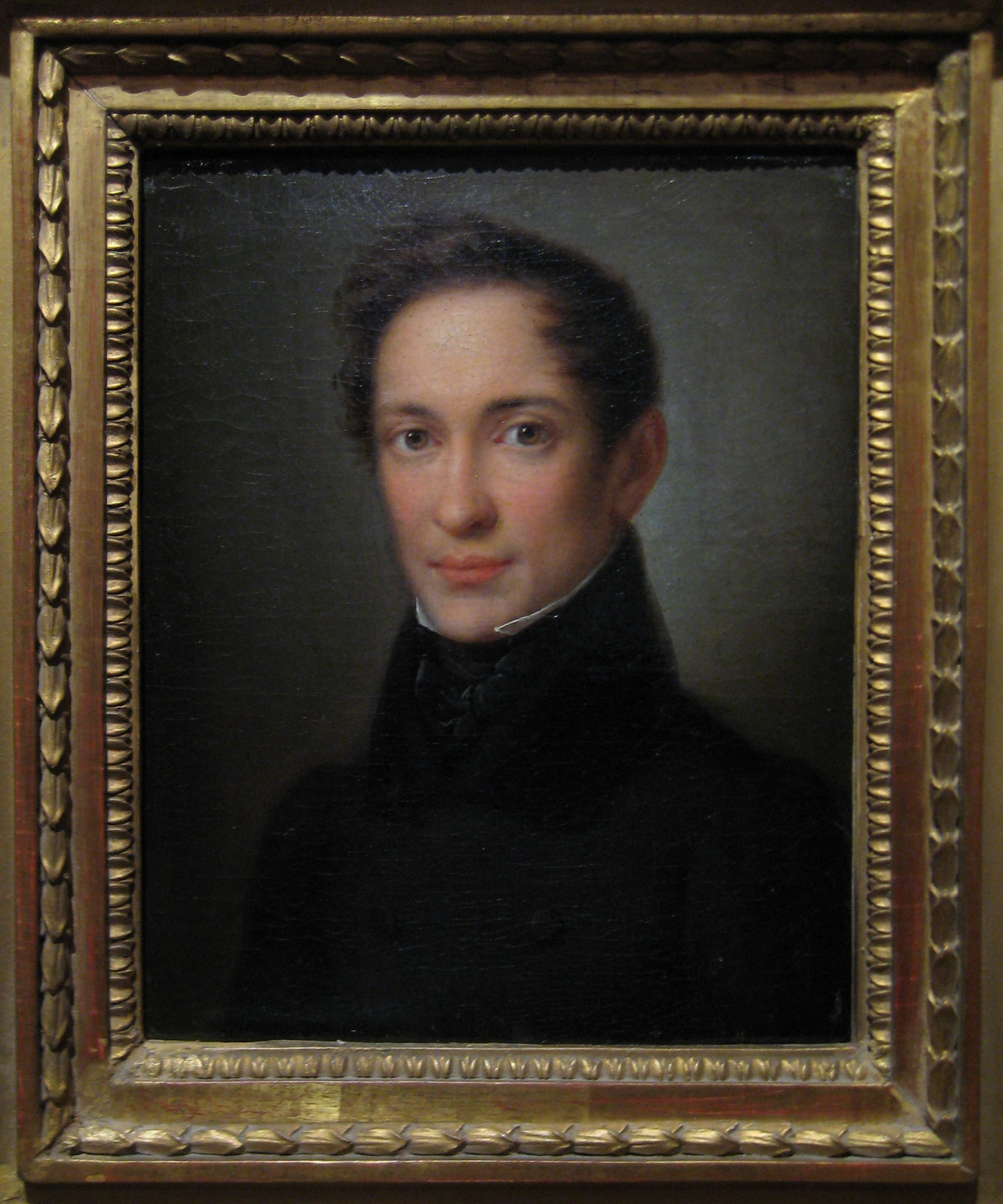
Alexander Herzen in youth by Alexey Zbruyev (1830s)

Herzen (or Gertsen) was an illegitimate son of a rich Russian landowner, Ivan Yakovlev, and Henriette Wilhelmina Luisa Haag from Stuttgart. Yakovlev gave his son the surname Herzen because he was a "child of his heart" (German: Herz).

He was first cousin to Sergei Lvovich Levitsky, considered the patriarch of Russian photography and one of Europe's most important early photographic pioneers, inventors and innovators. In 1860, Levitsky would immortalize Herzen in a famous photograph.

Herzen was born in Moscow, shortly before Napoleon's invasion of Russia and brief occupation of the city. His father, after a personal interview with Napoleon, was allowed to leave Moscow after agreeing to bear a letter from the French to the Russian emperor in St. Petersburg. His family accompanied him to the Russian lines.

A year later, the family returned to Moscow and stayed there until after Herzen had completed his studies at Moscow University. In 1834, Herzen and his lifelong friend Nikolay Ogarev were arrested and tried for attending a festival where verses by Sokolovsky, that were uncomplimentary to the tsar, were sung. He was found guilty, and in 1835 banished to Vyatka, now Kirov, in north-eastern European Russia. He remained there until 1837, when the tsar's son, Grand Duke Alexander (who later became become tsar Alexander II), accompanied by the poet Zhukovsky, visited the city and intervened on his behalf. Herzen was allowed to leave Vyatka for Vladimir, where he was appointed editor of the city's official gazette. In 1837, he eloped with his cousin Natalya Zakharina, secretly marrying her.

In 1839 he was set free and returned to Moscow in 1840, where he met literary critic Vissarion Belinsky, who was strongly influenced by him. Upon arrival, he was appointed as secretary to Count Alexander Stroganov, in the ministry of the interior at St Petersburg; but due to complaining about a death caused by a police officer, was sent to Novgorod where he was a state councillor until 1842. In 1846, his father died, leaving him a large inheritance.

In 1847, Alexander emigrated with his wife, mother and children, to Italy never to return to Russia. From Italy, on hearing of the revolution of 1848, he hastened to Paris and then to Switzerland. He supported the revolutions of 1848, but was bitterly disillusioned with European socialist movements after their failure. Herzen gained his reputation as a political writer. His assets in Russia were frozen due to his emigration, but Baron Rothschild, with whom his family had a business relationship, negotiated the release of the assets, which were nominally transferred to Rothschild.

Alexander and his wife Natalia had four children together. His mother and one of his sons died in a shipwreck in 1851. His wife carried on an affair with the German poet Georg Herwegh. In 1852, Natalia died from tuberculosis, and Alexander left Geneva for London, where he settled for many years. He hired Malwida von Meysenbug to educate his daughters. With the publications of his Free Russian Press, which he founded in London in 1853, he tried to influence the situation in Russia and improve the situation of the Russian peasantry he idolized.

In 1856, he was joined in London by his old friend Nikolay Ogarev. They worked together on their Russian periodical Kolokol ("Bell"). Soon Alexander began an affair with Natalia Tuchkova, Ogarev's wife, daughter of the war hero general Nikolay Tuchkov. Tuchkova and Alexander had three children. Ogarev found a new wife and the friendship between Herzen and Ogarev survived.

Herzen spent time in London organising with the International Workingmen's Association, becoming well acquainted with revolutionary circles including the likes of Mikhail Bakunin and Karl Marx. It was during his time in London that Herzen began to make a name for himself for "scandal-mongering" when he told Bakunin, freshly arriving after having escaped imprisonment in Siberia, that Marx had accused him of being a Russian agent; in reality, the two were on very good terms.

In 1864, Herzen returned to Geneva and, after some time, went to Paris where he died in 1870 of tuberculosis complications. Originally buried in Paris, his remains were taken to Nice a month later.

== Political positions ==
Herzen promoted the ideas of Westernizer Vissarion Belinsky after his death in 1848. He was influenced by Voltaire, Schiller, Saint-Simon, Proudhon, and especially Hegel and Feuerbach. Herzen started as a liberal but increasingly adopted socialism. He left Russia permanently in 1847, but his newsletter Kolokol, published in London from 1857 to 1867, was widely read. Herzen combined key ideas of the French Revolution and German idealism. He disliked bourgeois or middle-class values, and sought authenticity among the peasantry. He fought for the emancipation of the Russian serfs, and, after that took place in 1861, he escalated his demands regarding constitutional rights, common ownership of land, and government by the people.

Herzen was disillusioned with the Revolutions of 1848 but not disillusioned with revolutionary thought. He became critical of those 1848 revolutionaries who were "so revolted by the Reaction after 1848, so exasperated by everything European, that they hastened on to Kansas or California". Herzen had always admired the French Revolution and broadly adopted its values. In his early writings, he viewed the French Revolution as the end of history, the final stage in social development of a society based on humanism and harmony. Throughout his early life, Herzen saw himself as a revolutionary radical called to fight the political oppression of Nicholas I of Russia. Essentially, Herzen fought against the ruling elites in Europe, against Christian hypocrisy and for individual freedom and self-expression.

He promoted both socialism and individualism and argued that the full flowering of the individual could best be realized in a socialist order. However, he would always reject grand narratives such as a predestined position for a society to arrive at and his writings in exile promoted small-scale communal living with the protection of individual liberty by a non-interventionist government.

== Writings ==
His literary career began in 1842 with the publication of an essay, in Russian, on Dilettantism in Science, under the pseudonym of Iskander, the Turkish form of his Christian name. His second work, also in Russian, was his Letters on the Study of Nature (1845–46). In 1847 appeared his novel Who is to Blame? This is a story about how the domestic happiness of a young tutor, who marries the unacknowledged daughter of a Russian sensualist of the old type, dull, ignorant and genial, is troubled by a Russian sensualist of the new school, intelligent, accomplished, and callous, with there being no possibility of saying who is most to blame for the tragic ending.

Also in 1847 he published in Russian periodicals the stories which were afterwards collected and printed in London in 1854, under the title of Prervannye Rasskazy (Interrupted Tales). In 1850 two works appeared, translated from the Russian manuscripts, From the Other Shore and Lettres de France et d'Italie. In French also appeared his essay Du Developpement des idées revolutionnaires en Russie, and his Memoirs, which, after being printed in Russian, were translated under the title of Le Monde russe et la Révolution (3 vols., 1860–1862), and were in part translated into English as My Exile to Siberia (2 vols., 1855) and as My Past and Thoughts.

=== Works ===
- Legend (Легенда, 1836)
- Elena (Елена, 1838)
- Notes of a Young Man (1840)
- Diletantism in Science (1843)
- Who is to Blame? (Кто виноват?, 1846)
- Mimoezdom (Мимоездом, 1846)
- Dr. Krupov (Доктор Крупов, 1847)
- Thieving Magpie (novel) (Сорока-воровка, 1848)
- The Russian People and Socialism (Русский народ и социализм, 1848)
- From the Other Shore (1848–1850)
- Letters from France and Italy (1852)
- Selected Philosophical Works 1956
- My Past and Thoughts: The Memoirs of Alexander Herzen

== Free Russian Press ==
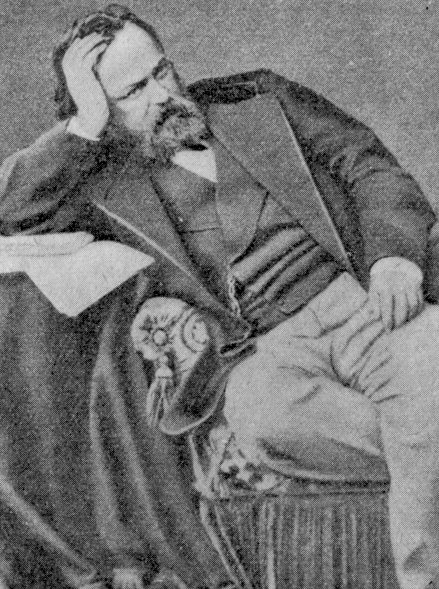
Alexander Herzen, by Sergei Lvovich Levitsky, 1860

Having founded in London in 1853 his Free Russian Press, the fortunes of which he gave an interesting account in a book published (in Russian) in 1863, he published a large number of Russian works, all against the system of government prevailing in Russia. Some of these were essays, such as his Baptized Property (1853), an attack on serfdom; others were periodical publications, the Polyarnaya Zvyezda (or Polar Star), the Kolokol (or Bell), and the Golosa iz Rossii (or Voices from Russia).

As the first independent Russian political publisher, Herzen began publishing The Polar Star, a review which appeared infrequently and was later joined by The Bell, a journal issued between 1857 and 1867 at Herzen's personal expense. Both publications acquired great influence via an illegal circulation in Russian territory; it was said the Emperor himself read them. Both publications gave Herzen influence in Russia reporting from a liberal perspective about the incompetence of the Tsar and the Russian bureaucracy.

For its first three years, the Russian Free Press went on printing without selling a single copy and scarcely able to get a single copy into Russia; so when at last a bookseller bought 10 shillings worth of Baptized Property, the half-sovereign was set aside by the surprised editors in a special place of honor. The death of emperor Nicholas in 1855 led to a complete change. Herzen's writings, and the magazines he edited, were smuggled wholesale into Russia, and their words resounded throughout the country, and all over Europe. Their influence grew.

The year 1855 gave Herzen reason to be optimistic; Alexander II had ascended the throne and reforms seemed possible. Herzen urged the Tsarist regime 'Onward, onward' towards reform in The Polar Star in 1856. Writing in 1857 Herzen became excited by the possibility of social change under Alexander II, "A new life is unmistakably boiling up in Russia, even the government is being carried away by it". The Bell broke the story that the government was considering serf emancipation in July 1857, adding that the government lacked the ability to resolve the issue. Yet by 1858, full serf emancipation had not been achieved and Herzen grew impatient with reform. By May 1858 The Bell restarted its campaign for the comprehensive emancipation of the serfs. Once the Emancipation reform of 1861 in Russia was achieved, The Bell's campaign changed to 'Liberty and Land', a program that tried to achieve further social change in support of serf rights. Alexander II granted serfs their freedom, the law courts were remodelled, trial by jury was established, and liberty was, to a great extent, conceded to the press.

== Contemporary reputation ==
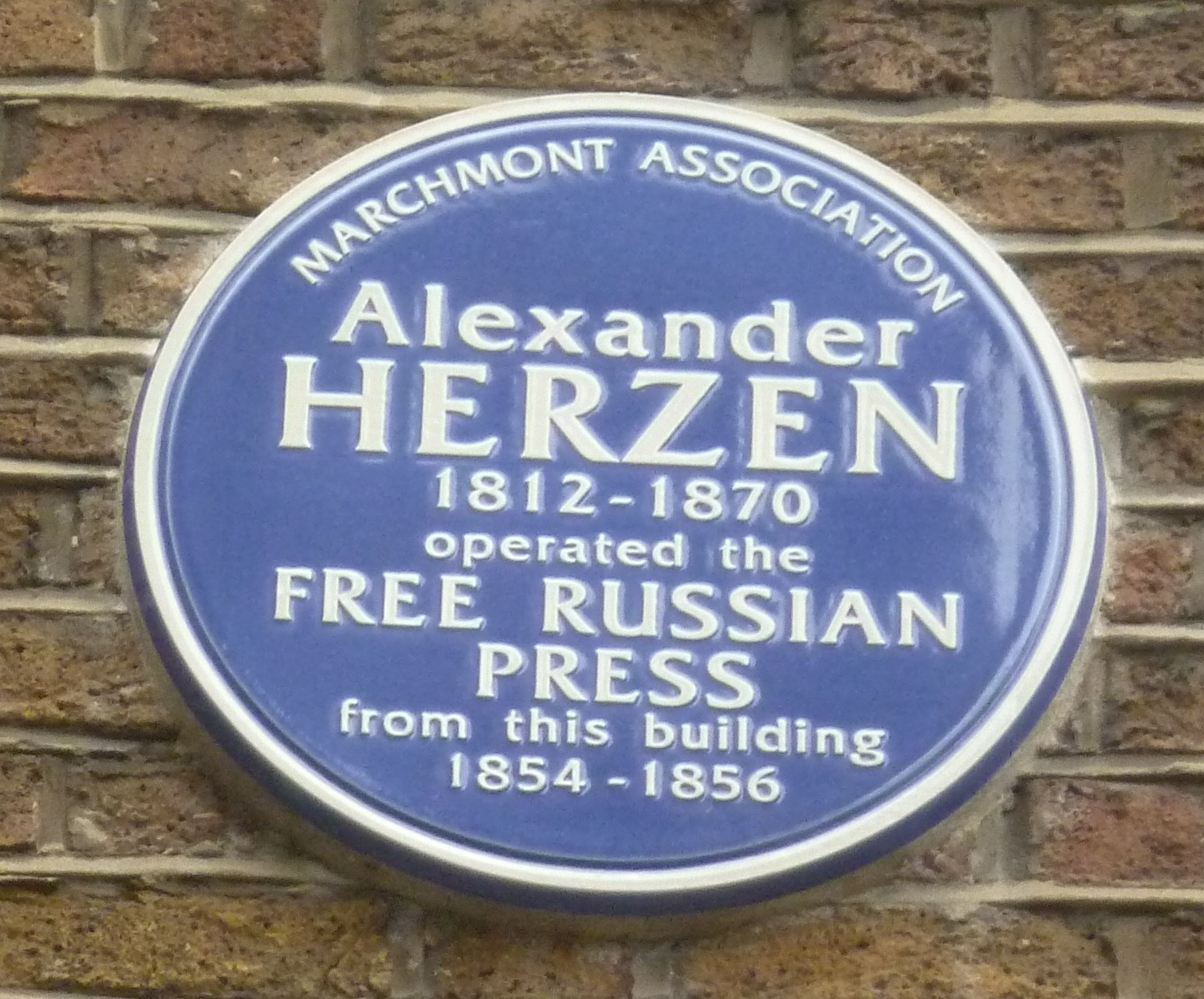
Alexander Herzen plaque in London's Judd Street.

Herzen drew criticism from both liberals who opposed violence and from radicals who thought Herzen was too soft. Liberals led by Boris Chicherin and Konstantin Kavelin believed individual freedom would be achieved through the rationalisation of social relations. Their statist variety of liberalism was opposed by Herzen as it supposed that Russian society would evolve to an ideal state based on a Hegelian view of reason. They believed the revolutionaries would merely postpone the establishment of the ideal state, while Herzen thought that, on the contrary, they were blind to historical reality.

Russian radicals disliked Herzen as too moderate. Radicals such as Nikolai Chernyshevsky and Nikolay Dobrolyubov wanted more commitment to violent revolution and the withdrawal of any hope in the reformist Tsar. Radicals asked Herzen to use The Bell as a mouthpiece for violent radical revolution, but Herzen rejected these requests. He argued that the Russian Radicals were not united and strong enough to create successful political change, stating, "You want happiness, I suppose? I dare say you do! Happiness has to be conquered. If you are strong, take it. If you are weak, hold your tongue". Herzen feared a new revolutionary government would merely replace the dictatorship with another dictatorship.

The radicals describe Herzen as a liberal for not wanting immediate change, but Herzen rejects their pleas arguing for change at a pace that will ensure success. Herzen briefly joined with other Russian liberals such as Kavelin to promote the peasant 'awakening' in Russia. Herzen continued to use The Bell as an outlet to promote unity with all sections of the Russian society behind a demand for a national parliament.

However his hopes of acting as a uniting force were ended by the January Uprising of 1863/1864, when the liberal support for Tsarist revenge against the Poles ended Herzen's link with them; Herzen had pleaded the insurgents' cause. This breach resulted in a declining readership for The Bell, which ceased publication in 1867. By his death in 1870, Herzen was almost forgotten.

== Influence in the 19th and 20th century ==
"There are two authors whom I make propaganda for: one is Herzen, the other is Shestov. They are both totally decent, open-minded, open-hearted human beings."

— Isaiah Berlin

Herzen opposed the aristocracy that ruled 19th century Russia and supported an agrarian collectivist model of social structure. A rise in populism by 1880 led to a favourable re-evaluation of his writings. In Russia the distinctly western notion of "progress" was replaced by a conservative promise of modernization based on the incorporation of modern technology to serve the established system. The promise of modernization in the service of autocracy frightened Herzen who warned of a Russia governed by "Genghis Khan with a telegraph."

Alongside populism, Herzen is also remembered for his rejection of corrupt government of any political persuasion and for his support for individual rights. A Hegelian in his youth, this translated into no specific theory or single doctrine dominating his thought. Herzen came to believe the complex questions of society could not be answered and that Russians must live for the moment and not a cause, essentially life is an end in itself. Herzen found greater understanding by not committing himself to an extreme but rather lived impartially enabling him to equally criticise competing ideologies. Herzen believed that grand doctrines ultimately result in enslavement, sacrifice and tyranny.

Tolstoy declared that he had never met another man "with so rare a combination of scintillating brilliance and depth". Herzen was a hero of the 20th-century philosopher Isaiah Berlin. The words of Herzen that Berlin repeated most insistently were those condemning the sacrifice of human beings on the altar of abstractions, the subordination of the realities of individual happiness or unhappiness in the present to glorious dreams of the future. Berlin, like Herzen, believed that "the end of life is life itself" and that each life and each age should be regarded as its own end and not as a means to some future goal. Berlin called Herzen's autobiography "one of the great monuments to Russian literary and psychological genius, worthy to stand beside the great novels of ... Turgenev and Tolstoy."

Russian Thinkers (The Hogarth Press, 1978), a collection of Berlin's essays in which Herzen features, was the inspiration for Tom Stoppard's The Coast of Utopia, a trilogy of plays performed at London's National Theatre in 2002 and at New York's Lincoln Center in 2006–2007. Set against the background of the early development of Russian socialist thought, the Revolutions of 1848 and later exile, the plays examine the lives and intellectual development of, among other Russians, the anarchist Mikhail Bakunin, the literary critic Vissarion Belinsky, the novelist Ivan Turgenev and Herzen, whose character dominates the plays.

== See also ==
- Pluralism
