= Moskvityanin =

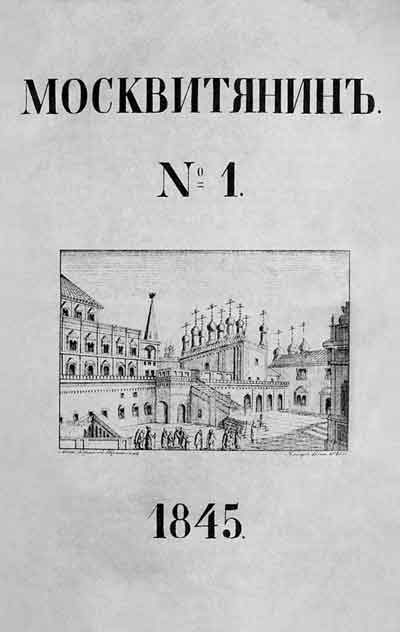

Moskvityanin (Москвитянин, "The Muscovite") was a monthly literary review published by Mikhail Pogodin in Moscow between 1841 and 1856. It was the mouthpiece of the Official Nationality theory espoused by Count Sergey Uvarov. The literary section was edited by Stepan Shevyrev. Gogol's novella Rome was first printed in Moskvityanin, as were many Slavophile papers. In 1850 the magazine was taken over by a young generation of Slavophiles which included Apollon Grigoryev. Their object of adulation was Alexander Ostrovsky. The frequency of the magazine switched from monthly to biweekly in 1849.
