= Aleksandr Milyukov =

Russian writer, literary critic and journalist

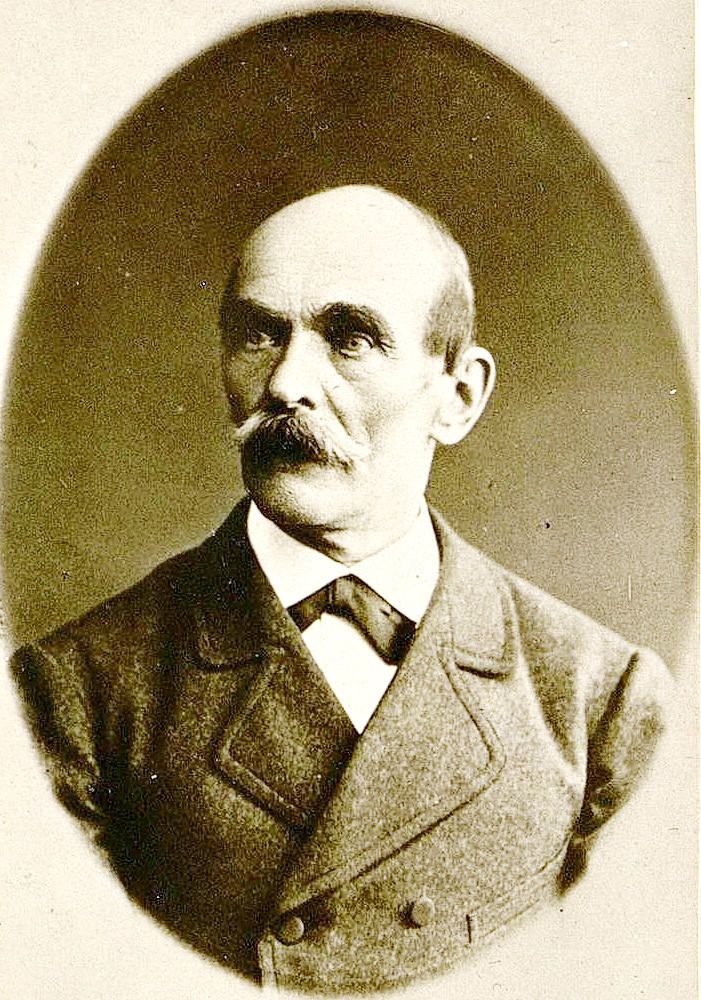
- Born: Aleksandr Petrovich Milyukov; 11 August 1816; Michurinsk, Tambov Governorate, Russian Empire
- Died: 6 February 1897 (aged 80); Saint-Petersburg, Russian Empire

Education
- Education: Saint Petersburg State University

Philosophical work
- Language: Russian
- Main interests: Novelist, literary critic, journalist, teacher

Signature
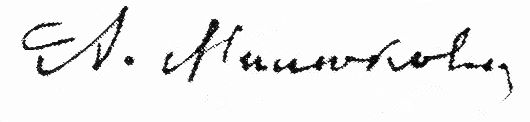

Aleksandr Milyukov (Russian: Милюков, Александр Петрович) (30 July [11 August] 1816, Kozlov, Tambov province — 6 February [18 February] 1897, St. Petersburg) was a Russian writer, literary critic, journalist, chief ideologist and actual editor of the magazine Svetoch, memoirist, educator, literary historian, traveller, bibliographer, professor, a friend of M. M. Dostoevsky and F. M. Dostoevsky, who took an active part in the literary life of Russia in the 1840s and 1880s. He was a prototype of F. M. Dostoevsky's S. V. Liputin — a character in the novel Demons, and a follower of the Petrashevsky-Fourier circle, who belonged to the moderate wing of the movement (S. F. Durov, A. N. Pleshcheev). Many of Milyukov's works are characterised as independent, deep and persuasive in their argumentation, contain many valuable observations and have stood the test of time.

The largest critical work, Essay on the History of Russian Poetry, went through three editions in the mid-19th century and served for half a century as a textbook on the course of Russian criticism for students of philology.

== Biography ==
Alexander Milyukov was the son of a Moscow burgher. He was born on July 30 (August 11), 1816, in Kozlov (Tambov Province). When he entered the gymnasium, Milyukov's father had to buy his son out of the bourgeois society, paying a lump sum that exceeded his annual income. Alexander was admitted to the Moscow gymnasium. After thar, in 1839, he entered to the Faculty of History and Philology of St. Petersburg University. This period is described in his work In Moscow 1820-1830s. There, he wrote about the poetic preferences of Moscow gymnasium students: “At that time, in addition to Pushkin, we were especially fond of Ryleyev and Polezhaev. A rare gymnasium student lacked a notebook with handwritten Thoughts and small poems by the latter poet. Although these works, as well as the very names of their authors, were forbidden fruits at that time, we often read them in class”. Ordinary gymnasium students showed a remarkable interest in literature, subscribing to literary magazines and buying the best new books. Each pupil contributed a monthly sum to the general treasury for the purchase of books. The pupils then decided where the money should be spent. Afterward, the books were raffled off by the gymnasium students, and the lottery proceeds were used to purchase new books. Gradually, the books settled in the home libraries of gymnasium students, depending on their reading habits.

After university, Alexander Petrovich worked as a teacher of Russian language and literature in gymnasiums and institutes of St. Petersburg. The pedagogical activity of A. P. Milyukov lasted 35 years. In particular, the materials of the Petrashevsky investigative case state that “in 1849 he taught Russian literature in the Second St. Petersburg gymnasium and in the Orphan Institute, and until June — in the Noble Regiment".

Milyukov began publishing in 1839 at Faddei Bulgarin's Northern Bee (under the pseudonym Sibiryak), but real literary fame came to Alexander Petrovich only after eight years, in 1847, when he published his first serious work, Essay on the History of Russian Poetry, written under the influence of V. G. Belinsky's ideas. For half a century, this book served as a manual on Russian literature for students of philology. In 1858, the second edition of Essay was reviewed by N. A. Dobrolyubov, who wrote the article On the Degree of Participation of Nationalities in the Development of Russian Literature. In total, Dobrolyubov reviewed five major works by Milyukov. (Note: А. P. Milyukov also succeeded N. A. Dobrolyubov in 1857-1858 as the private tutor of Russian literature to Natalia Alexandrovna Ostrovskaya — translator and memoirist, wife of the Minister of State Property M. N. Ostrovsky, brother of the famous playwright.) Essay brought Milyukov fame as a connoisseur of Russian literature, known for his outstanding critical sense, independent opinions in evaluating authors, and a clear understanding of the tasks of criticism. The third edition of the book was published in 1864.

According to the historian S. N. Shubinsky, in 1849 A. P. Milyukov was almost put on trial in the Petrashevsky case. A group of people close to the circle of M. V. Butashevich-Petrashevsky met in St. Petersburg on Wednesdays in the courtyard wing of the house No. 7 on Zhdanovskaya Embankment, in the apartment of Irinarkh Vvedensky, a teacher, translator and literary critic. The acquaintance of A. P. Milyukov and I. I. Vvedensky took place in 1843 at a trial lecture in the Noble Regiment. This acquaintance quickly developed into a close friendship. The common interest that united the two men was a passion for the ideas of V. G. Belinsky. In his lectures on literature, Milyukov instilled in his students "the spirit of free thought and criticism".

Among those who gathered at the “Wednesdays”, besides Milyukov, were N. G. Chernyshevsky, A. N. Pypin, P. S. Bilyarsky, and G. E. Blagosvetlov. The well-known conservative F. F. Vigel, aware of the gatherings, reported them to I. P. Liprandi, an official of the secret police. However, the intervention of Y. I. Rostovtsev, who supported I. I. Vvedensky, prevented arrests and further trials, despite the existence of a separate case against A. P. Milyukov. Some Petrashevites, including F. M. Dostoevsky, testified in the Milyukov case. Their testimony revealed that he had translated a book by the French Christian socialist Abbé La Mennais and had also read an article by A. I. Herzen titled Petersburg and Moscow. On August 29, 1849, Alexander Milyukov was questioned by an investigative commission but was ultimately found marginally guilty and placed under gendarme supervision.

A. P. Milyukov served as a link between the Petrashevsky circle and I. I. Vvedensky's group, a community of progressive literary figures engaged in teaching. Constant interaction with this literary circle brought Milyukov into close contact with Apollon Grigoriev, Lev Mey, Alexei Plescheyev, and Fyodor Dostoevsky. In 1862, alongside the St. Petersburg writer and poet Vsevolod Kostomarov —who was soon arrested and demoted to the rank of soldier for producing and distributing anti-government proclamations using his illegal printing press— Milyukov published the book History of the Literature of the Old and New World. In this context, reports indicated: “The most vigilant surveillance was established over the literary collaborator in the magazine Time and the literary groups Sovremennik and Russkoye Slovo, A. P. Milyukov”. The homes of A. P. Milyukov and A. N. Pleshcheev were searched following V. D. Kostomarov's denunciation of the proclamation To the Bar Peasants.

Milyukov's greatest literary preference was the poetic work of Alexander Pushkin; he was a passionate admirer of Pushkin's poetry and especially enjoyed reciting Eugene Onegin.[8] As a literary critic, Alexander Petrovich actively participated in the literary discussions of the 1850s–1870s, analyzing works such as I. A. Goncharov's novel Oblomov, F. M. Dostoevsky's Notes from the Dead House, and N. M. Karamzin's story Marfa Posadnitsa, written in 1803 but subjected to diverse criticism in the 1860s across various literary circles. He also discussed Leo Tolstoy's War and Peace, A. F. Pisemsky's Vziasna and The Stirred Sea, as well as N. S. Leskov's chronicle The Soborians, among others.

Athens and Constantinople (1859)

In 1874, Milyukov published a poetry anthology Pearls of Russian Poetry, which, according to the magazine Niva, demonstrated "fine literary taste and an understanding of poetry" and is considered an exemplary chrestomathy of Russian poetry. In addition to his critical work, Alexander Petrovich is also known as a writer. His works were published in nearly all major magazines and newspapers, including Biblioteka Dlya Chteniya, Otechestvennye Zapiski, Russkoe Slovo, Russky Vestnik, Vsemirny Trud, Vremya, Epoch, Istorichesky Vestnik, Sankt-Peterburgskie Vedomosti — especially frequently from 1875 to 1884, sometimes up to 50 articles a year —Golos, Pravitelstvenny Vestnik, and Niva. Furthermore, A. P. Milyukov served as editor for several publications, including Svetoch (since 1860), Syn otechestva (1869–1871), and Russky Mir (c. 1873). His works, such as The Tsar's Wedding (a bylin about the life of Ivan the Terrible), Stories from Ordinary Life, Stories and Travel Memoirs, Echoes on Literary and Social Phenomena, Travelling in Russia, Good Old Time, and Athens and Constantinople, were reprinted several times.

N. A. Dobrolyubov, in his review of Milyukov's book Athens and Constantinople and Alfred de Besse's book The Turkish Empire, compared the two works, praising Alexander Petrovich's work and criticizing the French author's work: "Would you believe that from a book of over 300 pages, with a long title reminiscent of Bulgarin's Russia, one can learn much less about Turkey than from Mr. Milyukov's travel sketches, which devote a hundred pages to Constantinople! <...> although he did not at all intend to present a complete characterization of Turkey...Mr. Milyukov's notes are very easy to read. Milyukov's notes are read very easily". Milyukov's memoirs, published in Russkaya Starina, Russkiy Vestnik, and Istoricheskiy Vestnik in the 1880s, were later republished in a separate edition in 1890 under the title Literary Meetings and Acquaintances.

=== Family ===
- Wife Agnessa Petrovna (? - 25.1.1864, St. Petersburg).
- Daughter Lyudmila Alexandrovna (d. 3.2.1901, St. Petersburg), buried with her father at Nikolsky cemetery.
- Daughter Olga Alexandrovna (1850, St. Petersburg - 1910).
- Son Boris Alexandrovich (Biba) (1860, St. Petersburg - ?), godson of F. M. Dostoevsky.
- Common-law wife Zinaida Valerianovna Narden (1837–December 17, 1918, Saratov).

=== Final years ===
The last years of Milyukov's life are described by his young friend E.N. Opochinin. In the 1870s and 1880s Milyukov still lived in St Petersburg on Officers' Street. He still organised literary "Tuesdays" in his house, which were attended by writers, mainly from the conservative circle, grouped around the magazine Syn otechestva of the late M. N. Katkov. N. Katkov. First of all, N. N. Strakhov, with whom Milyukov had already managed to restore friendly relations. Other guests included F. N. Berg, V. V. Krestovsky, V. P. Avenarius, D. V. Averkiev, an official of the Ministry of Internal Affairs, A. A. Radonezhsky, and G. P. Danilevsky, with whom A. P. Milyukov had established particularly cordial relations. The host, Alexander Petrovich, entertained the audience with stories from his past: about the tantrums of the censor Count M. N. Musin-Pushkin, about the travails of his youthful friend Ya. P. Butkov, the marriage of F. M. Dostoevsky and A. G. Snitkina, the arrest of his childhood friend Ya. G. Snitkina, about the arrest of F. M. Dostoevsky, about A. I. Herzen's play on words, etc. The memoirist notes Milyukov's cordiality and the peculiar old-fashioned cosiness of his apartment.

He died in St. Petersburg on 6 (18) February 1897 at the age of eighty. The St. Petersburg press reacted to his death with obituaries in Novoe Vremya, No. 7525, Historicheskiy Vestnik, No. 4, and Niva, No. 25 of 21 June. His companion Z. V. Narden died at the end of 1918. He was buried in the Nikolskie Cemetery of the Alexander Nevsky Lavra.

== Literary activities ==
=== Memoirist ===
For over fifty years, Alexander Petrovich was deeply involved in literary life in Russia and personally knew almost all the major figures in the literary and magazine world. His role as editor also required him to keep track of all significant literary and social events and maintain correspondence with writers and journalists. Thus, it becomes clear from his correspondence with N. S. Leskov that Milyukov, at Leskov's request, supported writers and journalists who found themselves without a magazine income. For example, such assistance was provided to the journalist of Golos and Birzhevye Vedomosti, L. K. Panyutin (pseudonym Nil Admirari).

In the course of time, A.P. Milyukov's pedagogical and literary merits were pushed into the background. Researchers often turned only to Milyukov's memoirs. In his memoirs Literary Meetings and Acquaintances, Milyukov recalled his meetings with the Dostoevsky brothers, Gogol, Herzen, Senkovsky, Yakov Butkov, Irinarkh Vvedensky, Apollon Grigoriev, Lev Mey, D.I. Yazykov, and others. Milyukov's memoirs were often the only source for the biography of a particular writer, especially the writer Ya.P. Butkov. In the Soviet era, Alexander Petrovich's literary memoirs were not republished in their entirety; only those concerning F. M. Dostoevsky, A. I. Herzen, N. G. Chernyshevsky, and some other literary figures were published in various collections. Milyukov's memoirs, written in vivid, imaginative language, have preserved for the modern reader many valuable observations on the literary life of Russia in the mid-19th century.

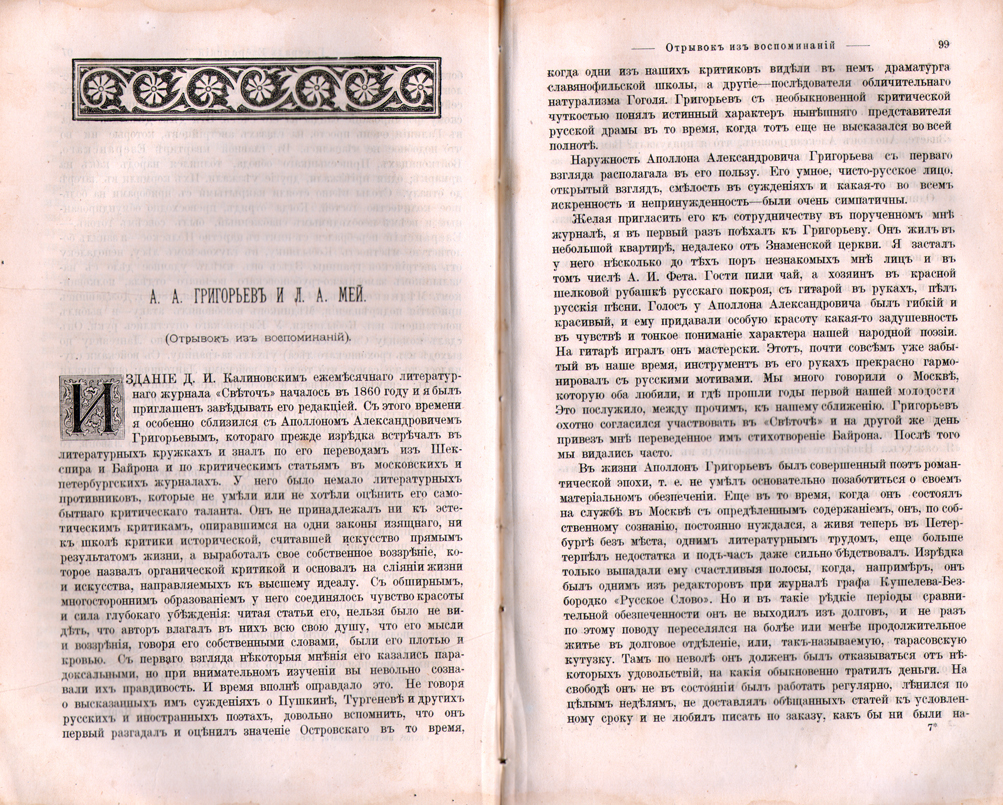
A. P. Milyukov's memoirs of Mey and Apollon Grigoriev in the magazine Historical Vestnik, 1883

Thus, describing his railway journey from Tsarskoye Selo to St. Petersburg in the summer of 1842, the memoirist recounts how, halfway through the journey, a swarthy gentleman entered their second-class carriage and introduced himself as an artist. The artist turned out to be an Italian who cut out silhouettes of people from paper; with an ingratiating bow, he offered his services to the passengers for one rouble per silhouette. The Italian claimed that he had been honoured by the attention of many famous people, and, to advertise his skills, showed samples of the silhouettes he had taken from life. Milyukov's young neighbour, a certain Mr. N., quickly recognized the images of Alexander Pushkin, Vasily Zhukovsky, and K. P. Bryullov, because, according to him, he knew all those depicted well. But at the last words of the omniscient Mr. N. about Bryullov, the neighbours opposite exchanged glances, and one of them, a gentleman in a mackintosh, began to ask the young man questions:

- Do you know Brullov?

- Yes, I do, — he answered without the slightest embarrassment.

- Probably from his painting The Last Day of Pompeii? The silhouette must have been carved from it. Well, you see, Briullov pokokoketnichali there, rejuvenated himself, and made up, otherwise both you, young man, and you, Mr. Artist, would have recognized him long ago, when he sits before you in his own right, — at these words, the gentleman with the espagnole raised his hat and inclined his head with a smile.

Milyukov's neighbour was embarrassed to see K. P. Bryullov in front of him, but the silhouette painter was not discouraged and immediately, ingratiatingly, asked for permission to make a portrait of Bryullov in profile, which he succeeded in doing. In five minutes, he cut out a very similar silhouette of Bryullov from black paper, which Karl Pavlovich praised. Bryullov offered the travelling artist a portrait of his companion in a cloak: "And you, young man," he continued, turning to N.", are so interested in meeting famous people that you must have seen Nikolai Vasilievich Gogol?" At the same time, Milyukov writes, he suspected that Bryullov's question to the young man was provocative: "I suspected that Bryullov's comrade was the author of The Government Inspector, which was then causing the most lively discussions in society and among the majority of university youth. It seemed to me that his face was much more handsome than in the lithographic portrait of him, and that in reality it did not bear so sharply the sarcastic expression with which the artists had given it. My Khlestakov, however, seeing that Bryullov was setting a trap for him, replied to the artist that unfortunately he had not had the opportunity to meet Gogol. Let me recommend him to you".

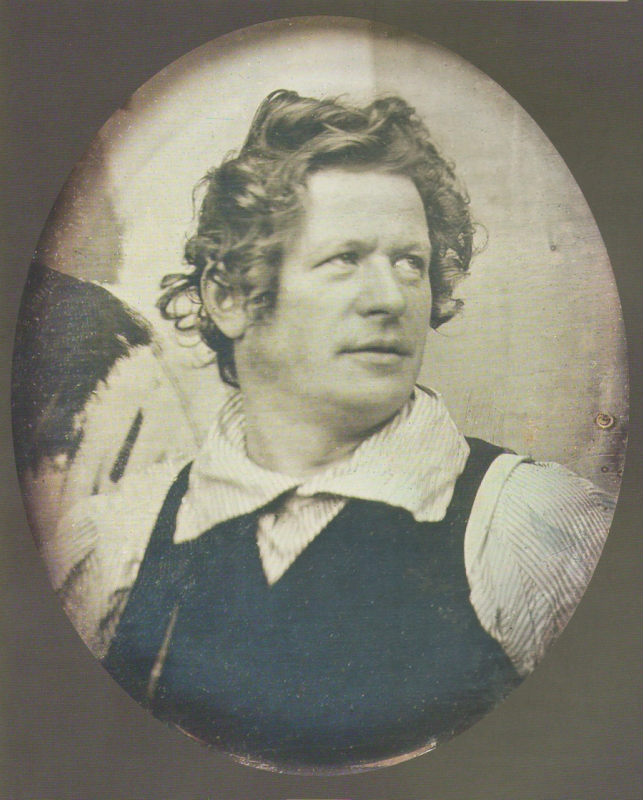
Karl Bryullov. Daguerreotype image from the Hermitage collection

Gogol was displeased that Bryullov had introduced him to the carriage audience, thus depriving him of the opportunity to observe the type of the new Khlestakov in person, and he strongly objected to the Italian's posing. The Italian stared at Gogol for some time, then bowed and went into a neighbouring carriage. When the Tsarskoye Selo railway train arrived in St. Petersburg, all the passengers got out of the carriage, and the skilful paper-cut artist approached Milyukov and his neighbour, showed them "cut with remarkable resemblance" paper-cuts of Gogol and Bryullov, and immediately sold his wares to Mr. N.

The described events could have taken place between May 23 and June 5, 1842, when Gogol was in St. Petersburg on the occasion of the beginning of the printing of Dead Souls and before his last trip to Europe. However, as Y. V. Mann notes, it could also have been in 1839, because a year earlier, in one of his letters, the writer reported: "...I would like to take a long trip on the railway..." Dostoevsky scholar G.L. Bograd notes the similarity between the description of Gogol's clothes in the second-class carriage and those of the protagonist of F.M. Dostoevsky's novel The Idiot, Prince Myshkin, on his way from Switzerland to St. Petersburg. According to Milyukov, Gogol was dressed "in a not very ordinary cloak with a hood"; for Dostoevsky, "he was wearing a rather wide and thick sleeveless cloak with a huge hood". It is worth noting that Milyukov's memoirs were published in 1880, while Dostoevsky wrote The Idiot in 1867.

Editing the magazine Svetoch brought Milyukov into contact with many literary figures, including Nikolai Strakhov, Apollon Grigoriev, Lev Mey, and others. In Grigoriev, Milyukov noticed a distinctive critical talent that followed neither the West, nor the Slavophiles, nor the proponents of the theory of "pure art". They bonded over their shared Moscow past, which they both loved but had to leave behind to live in St. Petersburg. Milyukov describes Grigoriev's appearance: "His intelligent, purely Russian face, open-mindedness, courage in judgement, and a certain sincerity and ease in everything were very appealing". Milyukov also recalls the critic's musical talents: "Dressed in a red silk shirt of Russian cut, with a guitar in his hands, he sang Russian songs. Apollon Alexandrovich's voice was flexible and soft, and he gave it a special beauty, a certain soulfulness of feeling, and a subtle understanding of the nature of our folk poetry. He played the guitar skilfully. In his hands, this almost forgotten instrument harmonised perfectly with Russian motifs".

However, according to Alexander Petrovich's recollections, Grigoriev shared the fate of many talented Russian writers: he was constantly poor, often drunk, and spent long periods in the debtors' prison. Ironically, it was there that he could concentrate on his work, as, when free, he led the careless life of a bohemian poet, failing to fulfill his obligations to magazine editors. These editors frequently gave him advances for future works —poems, translations, and articles— that he often left unfinished. Mikhail Dostoevsky, the editor of Vremya, once joked: "Do you know, Apollon Alexandrovich, what I've thought up? You need money: I will give you a short-term promissory note, put you in debtors' prison for non-payment, and you will write me glorious articles there. Isn't that a good idea?" Apollon Grigoriev was very close to Lev Mey. The two friends led a distinctly bohemian lifestyle, earning just enough to get by and drawing inspiration from oysters and champagne.

In Milyukov's memory, the poet's inimitable wardrobe in Mey's apartment was particularly striking. It was a most ordinary painted wooden box, "which could have been bought at the Shchukin Yard for about five rubles". There were no rarities in the cabinet — just a decanter, a glass, and some papers. The main feature of Mey's wardrobe was that the poet had turned it into a literary album: "The fact is that the whole unpainted interior of the wardrobe, between the upper shelves, against the door, and along the sides, was written in prose and verse. Here, at the owner's request, all the writers who knew him dedicated a few lines to his memory, and among these autographs one could see the names of many representatives of our literature of the forties and fifties. "Seems that the owner of this original album cherished it very much, because everything written was well preserved: the pencil was carefully varnished, and I did not see a single erased or half-smoothed line. I regret that I did not think to write down some of the more curious dedications".

Once, Lev Mey, freezing in his unheated flat, invited the caretaker to chop up his precious wardrobe for firewood to light the fireplace in front of the public. The pitiful caretaker, however, managed to save Mey's unique piece of furniture by agreeing to bring wood from other tenants instead: "What do you mean, Lev Alexandrovich! How can you chop up a good wardrobe for that?" No less eccentric was Lev Mey's appearance at public poetry readings, where the poet was famously unable to finish any of his poems. Despite this, the sympathetic audience indulged the forgetful poet and sent him off with friendly applause.

=== N. G. Chernyshevsky ===
A. P. Milyukov met N. G. Chernyshevsky in the circle of I. I. Vvedensky. Their meetings took place from December 1849 to autumn 1850, though the formal introduction occurred only on February 15, 1850. According to Milyukov, Chernyshevsky gave the impression of being a shy person: "At Vvedensky's meetings, the most frequent visitors were Vladimir Dmitrievich Yakovlev, author of the book Italy; Grigory Evlampievich Blagosvetlov, later editor of the magazine Delo; and Vladimir Ryumin, editor of Obschezanimatelny Vestnik. A little later, Chernyshevsky, then a young man, modest and even a little shy, began to attend these evenings. In him, the contradiction between his soft, feminine voice and the sharpness of his opinions, often very original in their paradox, was particularly striking".

After meeting Milyukov, Chernyshevsky reflected in his diary on his future life with his wife in St. Petersburg: "I shall certainly introduce her to Vvedensky's circle, especially, apart from Vvedensky, to Ryumin, Milyukov, and Gorodkov". Good relations between Chernyshevsky and Milyukov were not immediately established. Milyukov seemed to him a man who was not entirely sincere. However, Chernyshevsky soon realized that his suspicions were in vain. Milyukov had joined the circle of S. F. Durov, which included A. N. Plesheyev and F. M. Dostoevsky, shortly before the arrest of the Petrashevtsy. This circumstance changed Chernyshevsky's attitude toward Milyukov for the better. Chernyshevsky later admitted: "I began to respect him mainly after reading his History of Poetry — a really useful book".

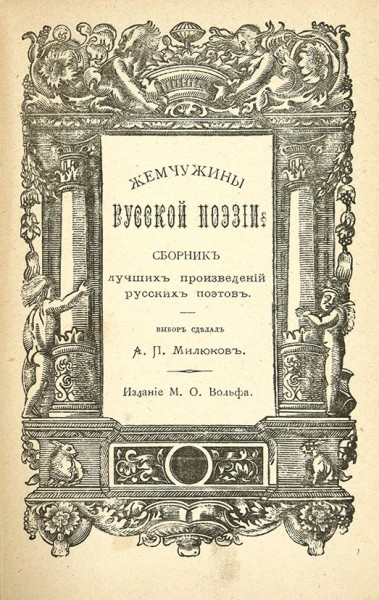
Pearls of Russian Poetry, 1874

Milyukov's book was lively discussed by the members of Irinarkh Vvedensky's circle. Along with Vvedensky and Chernyshevsky himself, Dr. A. A. Chumikov, who also attended these meetings, expressed his opinion of the book in a letter to A. I. Herzen. He credited A.P. Milyukov with promoting "Belinsky's ideas about Russian literature". As a contemporary researcher writes, "the closeness of the content of the essays to Belinsky's literary-critical assessments was a guarantee for Chernyshevsky in his closer rapprochement with his new acquaintance in Vvedensky's circle". Thus, in the winter of 1850, when Chernyshevsky wrote to his friend Mikhail Mikhailov with advice on how to better prepare for the exam on the history of Russian literature, he suggested that he use the textbooks of N. I. Grech, A. P. Mendeleev, A. P. Milyukov, A. D. Galakhov, S. P. Shevyrev, and V. N. Maykov: "Therefore, reread what you have written or what others have written on the history of Russian literature. — Part 4 of Grech's History of Russian Literature seems to be very well known to you; reread Belinsky and V. Maikov; Milyukov's book, if you can get it, is also worth reading; Galakhov's notes to the textbook, too; it does no harm to look through his historical textbook, if you have it, etc." At the same time, however, Chernyshevsky stipulated: "Of course, all this nonsense <...> except for articles by Belinsky, <...> nothing you will need; and therefore, read what you have, what is not, throw it out, and forget to think..."

A. A. Demchenko suggests that the radicalization of N. G. Chernyshevsky's views during these years could have resulted from the future revolutionary's communication with non-radical figures such as A. P. Milyukov, A. A. Chumikov, and other Petrashevtsy, because they had documents that Chernyshevsky did not possess. For example, Belinsky's famous letter to Gogol was known to Milyukov from Petrashevsky's meetings at S. F. Durov's, and Chernyshevsky, the researcher suggests, could have learned about it from Milyukov and Chumikov. At the meetings of Vvedensky's circle, Milyukov told humorous stories from Gogol's life, which annoyed Chernyshevsky, who at that time was an unqualified admirer of the writer. In Chernyshevsky's opinion, for whom Gogol remained an unquestioned authority, Milyukov's stories were vulgar. According to researchers, Chernyshevsky, after becoming acquainted with Belinsky's letter to Gogol, treated this document with restraint and did not share the general pathos of adoration for Belinsky. However, this state of divided admiration for both Gogol and Belinsky did not last long.

=== Alexander Herzen ===
Alexander Petrovich wrote in his memoirs that he was unable to meet Herzen before leaving Russia, although Milyukov strongly desired it at the time. Such an opportunity arose only 10 years later, during his trip abroad to London in 1857. Like many others, Milyukov writes, he was fascinated by Herzen's liberal ideas without sharing their extremes. Soviet commentators on Herzen note that, by this time, Milyukov had already "withdrawn from direct participation in the Russian liberation movement", so his interpretations of some of Herzen's statements are erroneous. Nevertheless, "the article by A. P. Milyukov, interestingly and vividly written, contains many valuable observations and conveys a number of important thoughts of Herzen..."

The verbal portrait of Herzen, as depicted by Milyukov, is as follows: "...the short, dense figure struck with energy and vivacity, and the beautiful head, with long dark-blond hair thrown back and intelligent, expressive eyes, attracted attention from the first glance". Milyukov complements Herzen's character by contrasting it with the portrayal of N. P. Ogaryov.

It is well known that Herzen and Ogaryov had been close friends since childhood, but their natures were noticeably dissimilar: one — boiling, lively as mercury; the other — calm and restrained. Herzen amazed those around him with his vivacity and wit: his speech sparkled with an inexhaustible cascade of witticisms, jokes, puns, and a brilliant play of unexpected convergences of thoughts and images. Ogaryov, by contrast, spoke with strict, almost premeditated precision, though not without a certain dreaminess. <...> I may be mistaken, but I believe that, without Herzen's influence, Ogaryov would not have been drawn to political and social propaganda and would instead have remained true to the artistic vocation of his poetic nature.

The formal reason for the acquaintance between the two writers was the same work by A. P. Milyukov, Essay on the History of Russian Poetry. A year before his trip to London, Milyukov sent his book to Herzen by post. Soon after, Alexander Petrovich received a letter from Herzen proposing they meet abroad, which Milyukov accepted. He spent a fortnight in London, talking and walking with Herzen. During their time together, Herzen shared stories of his exile in Vyatka, Vladimir, and Novgorod, as well as his life in emigration, his views on the Polish question, and the fate of European democracy following the revolutions of 1848–1849. Herzen also took Milyukov to the British Museum; together, they visited the Tower of London and attended the Grand Handel Festival at the Crystal Palace in Sydenham Hill, held on 15 June 1857.

The two literary men spoke extensively about music, musical theater, drama, literature, and poetry, particularly Byron's works. In response to a gift from A. P. Milyukov, Herzen gave him the book Letters from France and Italy. Shortly afterward, Alexander Petrovich embarked on a trip to Italy and Greece. Herzen carefully read Milyukov's Essay on the History of Russian Poetry. On 29 April 1859, Herzen addressed the German writer Malvida von Meysenbug in a letter, responding to her misunderstanding of M. Y. Lermontov. From this correspondence, we can infer that Herzen held a moderately positive opinion of Milyukov's book: "How could you think for a moment that Lermontov served voluntarily in the Caucasus! It is, indeed, sinful that you know so little of Russian life. Lermontov was originally exiled to the Caucasus, to the military. In 1837, for his poems on Pushkin's death; he returned in 1840, and immediately afterwards was exiled again to the Caucasian army as an officer, for having sent a challenge to a duel to Count Barant, the son of the French ambassador. Didn't you get Milyukov's history of Russian literature from me? It is quite good, and you may have learned something from it".

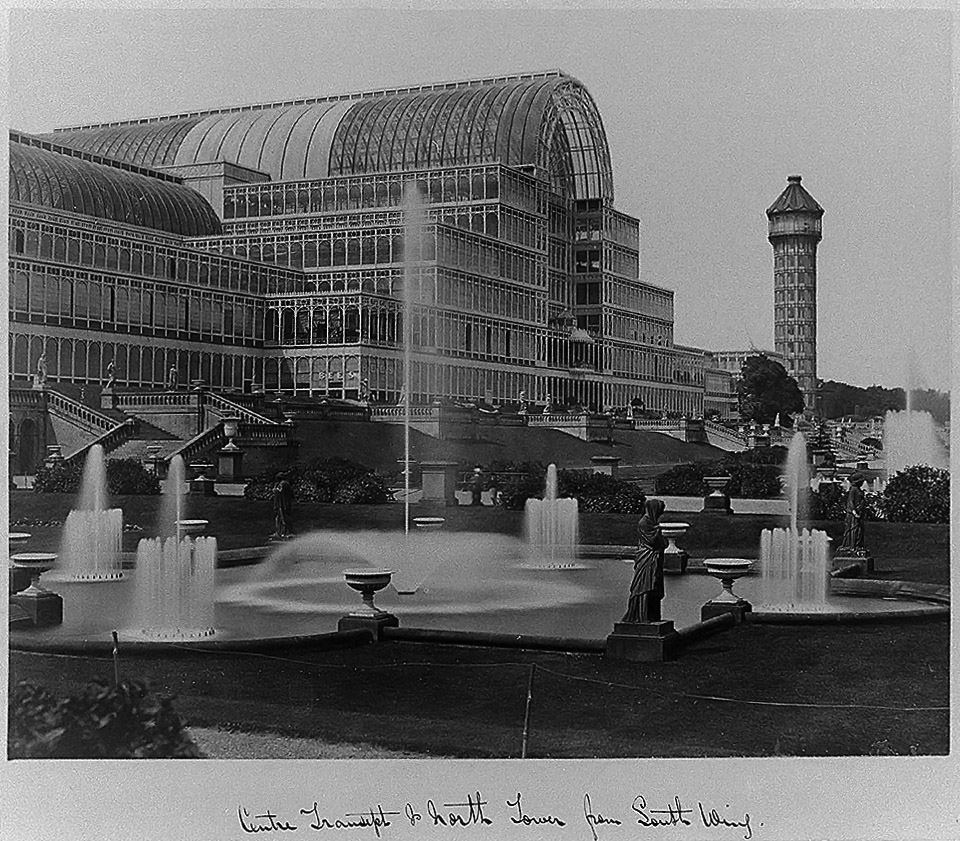
Crystal Palace at Sidney Hill, photo from 1854

Following Herzen's advice, Meysenbug carefully studied the Russian literary historian's book and incorporated some of Milyukov's research materials into her work. As a result, the published version of her article —particularly its introductory section— drew heavily from Milyukov's work. The article, titled Russian Literature: Mikhail Lermontov, appeared in the tenth issue of the London magazine National Review in 1860. Meysenbug utilized materials from the chapter Ancient Russian Literature in Milyukov's book to such an extent that sections of her article —Historical Tales of Nestor and Folk Songs and Fairy Tales— almost verbatim reproduced Milyukov's text. This reliance was evident in the lack of independent generalizations or critical commentary on the Russian author's work.

=== F. M. Dostoevsky before his exile ===
Commentators on F. M. Dostoevsky note that A. P. Milyukov, while participating in Irinarkh Vvedensky's circle, grew close to some members of the Petrashevsky group, particularly A. N. Plescheyev. Plescheyev, in turn, introduced Milyukov to S. F. Durov's circle, and it was through Durov that Milyukov met F. M. Dostoevsky in early 1848. However, A. P. Milyukov did not attend M. V. Butashevich-Petrashevsky's meetings directly. He later attributed this to Petrashevsky's dislike of him, citing "the sharp paradoxicality of his views and coldness to everything Russian" as the reason.

Milyukov only knew the literary and musical aspects of S. F. Durov's circle, while its more conspiratorial activities —led by N. A. Speshnev and F. M. Dostoevsky— remained unknown to him, just as they eluded the official investigation. Despite his later friendly relations with Fyodor Dostoevsky, it seems Milyukov was unaware that, under the guise of a literary and musical club, Durov, Dostoevsky, Speshnev, and Bukhov were secretly collaborating. Speshnev, without Butashevich-Petrashevsky's knowledge, planned to create a printing press to disseminate proclamations and promote socialist propaganda among the populace. Visitors like Milyukov served only as a facade for these covert activities. Nevertheless, Milyukov's name came up repeatedly during investigative inquiries. For example, F. M. Dostoevsky testified: "Mr. Milyukov at Durov's evenings was like all the guests. Since he himself is a literary man, his acquaintance with Durov and with the society that gathered at Durov's was a literary acquaintance. <...>. Once he mentioned—I do not recall in what context—that he had translated a well-known article by La Mennais into Slavic. It seemed strange and curious, and he was asked to show it. Milyukov brought it and read it aloud".

It was a Church Slavic translation of the introduction to Abbot La Mennais' book Paroles d'un croyant, titled New Revelation to Metropolitan Anthony of Novgorod, St. Petersburg, etc., by A. P. Milyukov. As Alexander Petrovich later recalled, F. M. Dostoevsky praised his translation, remarking: "The severe biblical tone of this work came through in my translation more expressively than in the original. Of course, he meant only the inherent quality of the language, but his review was very gratifying to me". S. F. Durov provided the investigative commission with the following description of the translated work by the French Christian socialist: "The content of this article is derived partly from the Holy Gospel, partly from prophecies; its message is that the weak are oppressed by the strong and that Jesus Christ himself was betrayed by bishops and princes to be condemned". The complete translation of Paroles d'un croyant was divided among A. P. Milyukov (introduction), A. N. Pleshcheev, and N. A. Mordvinov, an official of the Ministry of Internal Affairs (43 chapters). While Milyukov's translation has not survived, the translations of the remaining 43 chapters remain preserved in the Petrashevsky materials to this day.

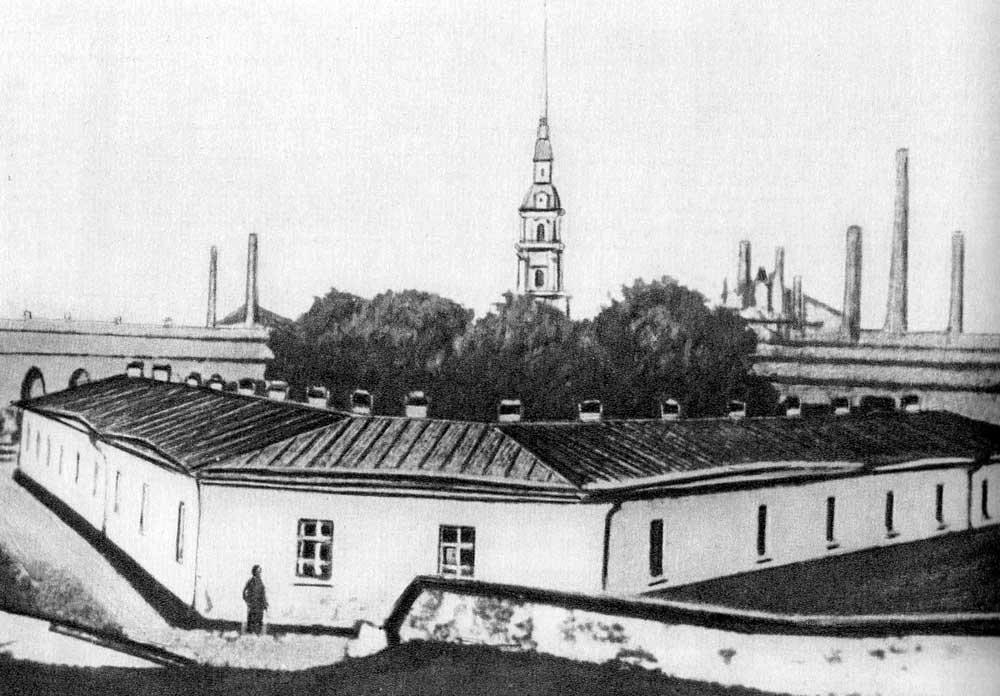
In 1849, most of Milyukov's mates ended up in the Alexeyevsky Ravelin of the Peter and Paul Fortress. Photo of 1870s

According to Milyukov's memoirs, heated debates took place at the Durov club between supporters of the socialist doctrines of Robert Owen, Cabé, Fourier, Proudhon, Saint-Simon, and their critics, with Fyodor Dostoevsky being one of the most ardent opponents. "While agreeing that the basis of the socialists' teachings was a noble goal, he regarded them as nothing more than honest fantasists... <...> He said that life in the Icarian commune or Phalanstery seemed to him more horrible and disgusting than any penal servitude". Not long before the club was closed, Belinsky's letter to Gogol was read aloud, and on 23 April 1849, Milyukov learned from Mikhail Dostoevsky about the arrest of the Petrashevsky group. This shared misfortune brought the two men closer, but soon M. M. Dostoevsky himself was arrested. During this time, Milyukov took Dostoevsky's eldest son, Fedya, to his dacha. A month later, M. M. Dostoevsky was released from the Peter and Paul Fortress, and the friends began meeting weekly. In August, after Milyukov returned from his holiday in the city, their meetings became even more frequent.

In August 1849, Alexander Petrovich spent three days in the Petropavlovsk Fortress, where he was interrogated by an investigative commission. However, the interrogation did not result in either arrest or prosecution. Milyukov's involvement in S. F. Durov's circle did not attract attention. Similarly, F. Durov did not catch the eye of Agent Liprandi, which is why the Commission of Inquiry showed little interest in him. Nevertheless, Milyukov was placed under tacit surveillance, though he never faced significant pressure from the Third Department. On 22 December 1849, Alexander Milyukov and Mikhail Dostoevsky bid farewell to Fyodor Dostoevsky and Sergei Durov at the Peter and Paul Fortress before they were sent into Siberian penal servitude. Ten years later, in December 1859, Milyukov and M. M. Dostoevsky met again at the Nikolayevsky railway station in St. Petersburg, where they welcomed Fyodor Dostoevsky, returning after a decade of servitude and exile.

While Fyodor Dostoevsky was in Siberia, the friendship between his brother and A. P. Milyukov deepened. Their correspondence with F. M. Dostoevsky resumed in 1858 when Alexander Petrovich sought to enlist the writer's cooperation for his newly conceived magazine, Svetoch. To this end, he sent his book Sketches of Finland through Mikhail Dostoevsky to Fyodor, along with a letter of recommendation for D. D. Minaev, who was then in Tver, where F. M. Dostoevsky spent the final months of his exile before returning to St. Petersburg.

At the end of 1859, at F. M. Dostoevsky's request, Milyukov sent him a Psalter in Slavic, a French translation of the Koran, and Les Romans de Voltaire to Tver. Meanwhile, at Milyukov's request, Fyodor Mikhailovich's brother, Mikhail, was translating Victor Hugo's novel The Last Day of the Condemned to Death for the magazine Svetoch. In one of his letters, Mikhail reported: "Milyukov has become editor of the critical department of the magazine Svetoch. It will be a good magazine. You will find familiar names there". The first issue of Svetoch, published by D. I. Kalinovsky, appeared under Milyukov's editorship in January 1860. The magazine followed a moderate-liberal program aimed at reconciling and uniting the ideas of the Slavophiles and the Westernizers. It sought to avoid political extremities and advocated for a gradual and conflictless approach to resolve Russia's pressing issues, particularly the peasant question, education, and glasnost. The moderate-liberal tone of the magazine was evident in both the editorial announcements, likely written by Milyukov on behalf of the publisher D. I. Kalinovsky, and in programmatic articles such as M. M. Dostoevsky's piece on A. N. Ostrovsky's Storm, as well as Milyukov's own article Final Word of the Russian Conversation, in which the critic impartially weighed the merits and shortcomings of the opposing parties — Westernizers and Slavophiles.

=== F. M. Dostoevsky after exile, Svetoch magazine ===
After Dostoyevsky was back from exile, his friendship with Milyukov was rekindled. In his memoirs about Dostoevsky, Alexander Petrovich noted that Fyodor Mikhailovich did not appear physically changed after his time in penal servitude: “He even seemed more awake than before and had not lost any of his usual energy.” However, Dostoevsky confessed in a letter to his brother Mikhail that, during his ten years of exile, he had forgotten Milyukov's first name and patronymic. The Dostoevsky brothers began attending the literary “Tuesdays” hosted by Alexander Petrovich at his home on Officers' Street in St. Petersburg, in the house of Jacobs. At these meetings, Fyodor Mikhailovich would share in detail the hardships he endured in Siberian penal servitude. These stories later contributed to the book Notes from the House of the Dead, though, due to censorship restrictions, not all of his experiences could be included in the published version.

As an example of the omissions in Notes from the Dead House, Milyukov cited Dostoevsky's story of a young peasant condemned to eternal servitude who killed his baron for abusing his bride after the wedding. The serf peasant could not endure the recurrence of the feudal law of the jus primae noctis and paid for it with twelve years of hard labor. On his way to the penal colony, he refused to tolerate the mistreatment of a drunken captain among the stagekeepers and stabbed him to death. Following this incident, the peasant's stay at the penal colony turned into a life sentence. Milyukov, along with I. S. Turgenev and A. I. Herzen, compared Dostoevsky to Dante and Notes from the Dead House to a depiction of hell. On 24 May 1860, at one of Milyukov's “Tuesdays”, F. M. Dostoevsky left a memoir about his arrest on 23 April 1849 in the album of Milyukov's daughter, Lyudmila Aleksandrovna (according to other reports, it was in the album of ten-year-old Olga Aleksandrovna). (Note: Elsewhere, however, commentators on The Complete Works of F. M. Dostoevsky indicate that it was Ludmila, not Olga, who made the memoir entry in Dostoevsky's scrapbook.)

The nature of the writers' meetings in Milyukov's salon was quite different from that of S. F. Durov's evenings. Alexander Petrovich describes the spiritual development of both himself and Dostoevsky in the following way: “Western Europe and Russia seemed to have reversed roles in these ten years: over there, the humane utopias that had once captivated us had crumbled to dust, and reaction had triumphed in everything, while here many of the things we had once dreamed of were beginning to be realized, and reforms were being prepared that renewed Russian life and sparked new hopes. It was clear that in our conversations, the former pessimism had faded”.

In his memoirs, Milyukov recalls the poem Solimskaya Getera by V. V. Krestovsky, which was read by the author in the presence of F. M. Dostoevsky. Written in 1858 and dedicated to A. P. Milyukov, the poem thematically resembles G. I. Semiradsky's painting The Sinner, completed a decade later. Dostoevsky was so taken with the poem that he later repeatedly asked Krestovsky to read it again. Later, with a dedication to Milyukov, the poem was published by Dostoevsky in the first issue of the magazine Vremya in 1861. Some lines from the poem were later used by Dostoevsky in 1863 in his feuilleton Again “Young Pen”, which was directed against M. E. Saltykov-Shchedrin.

Another friend of the Dostoevskys, the philosopher and publicist N. N. Strakhov, left detailed memories of the Tuesdays at Milyukov's. In his view, the main guests at Milyukov's Tuesdays were the Dostoevsky brothers, who always arrived together. Other regular guests included Apollon Maikov, Vsevolod Krestovsky, Dmitry Minaev, Stepan Yanovsky, A. A. Chumikov, Vladimir Yakovlev, and others. The central figure at Milyukov's Tuesdays was undoubtedly Fyodor Dostoevsky. Not only was he the most prominent and acknowledged writer in the group, but also the most outstanding thinker and an ardent publicist, whose abundance of ideas and extraordinary passion for expressing them astonished everyone present. The group was small, and the relationships among them were very close (for instance, on 11 September 1860, F. M. Dostoevsky became the godfather of A. P. Milyukov's son, Biba). In this intimate setting, Fyodor Mikhailovich's conversational style stood out: “He often spoke in a low voice, almost a whisper, until something particularly excited him; then, he would suddenly be inspired and raise his voice”.

Furthermore, N. N. Strakhov makes the following remark about the decisive influence of Milyukov's Tuesdays on his own development:

Conversations in the club occupied me greatly. It marked a new stage in my development, one that was in many ways at odds with the opinions and tastes I had previously formed <...>. Naturally, the direction of the circle was also shaped by the influence of French literature. Political and social issues took center stage here, overshadowing purely artistic interests. According to this view, the artist should follow the course of societal development, bringing to light the emerging good and evil, and thus act as a mentor, denouncer, or leader. In this way, it was almost explicitly stated that eternal and universal interests should be subordinated to the temporary and private. Fyodor Mikhailovich was deeply immersed in this journalistic direction and remained committed to it for the rest of his life.

A. P. Milyukov was a colleague of N. N. Strakhov at one of the educational institutions. Nikolai Nikolaevich owed his membership in the Dostoevsky circle and the publication of his works in Milyukov's magazine Svetoch to Alexander Petrovich. Strakhov's articles in Svetoch caught the attention of F. M. Dostoevsky, and when Fyodor Mikhailovich planned to launch his own pochvenniki journal, Vremya, in 1861, he invited Strakhov to contribute. It is also worth noting that Mikhail Dostoevsky, another contributor to Svetoch, left the magazine to join Vremya as well.

However, as G. M. Friedländer discovered, the program of Svetoch and its editorial statements had a direct influence on the ideological platform of the Pochvenniks and their magazine Vremya. The programs of the two journals, particularly in their approach to the disputes between Westerners and Slavophiles, were almost identical in terms of content. In addition to Strakhov and M. M. Dostoevsky, other active contributors to Svetoch included A. N. Maikov, V. V. Krestovsky, and D. D. Minaev. With the exception of Minaev, these authors later became the core editorial team of Vremya. Along with A. A. Grigoriev and A. N. Pleshcheev, they continued to contribute to both journals in 1861. However, their participation in Svetoch gradually diminished, and with the absence of prominent contributors, Milyukov's magazine began to lose its readership. The failure of Svetoch to become a major literary magazine can largely be attributed to A. P. Milyukov himself.

In 1859, A. N. Pleshcheev expressed doubts about Alexander Petrovich's ability to be an effective editor of Svetoch. He wrote to F. M. Dostoevsky: "Yesterday I received the program of Svetoch. Hell knows what names were included. There’s no proper ranking. They’ve mixed ours and yours up; they’ve placed you with a fart, and me with two basics. They say Milyukov has taken over the criticism section. He’s a good, clever man, but whether he can set the tone for the magazine and inspire it with a lively, new voice is still uncertain". In 1862, in the May issue of Svetoch, Milyukov published an article entitled Criminals and Unfortunates on Notes from the Dead House. He eventually ceased editing Svetoch, and from 1863 to 1864, he contributed to Dostoevsky's journals Vremya and Epokha. However, contrary to his promise to Milyukov, F. M. Dostoevsky never published in Svetoch.

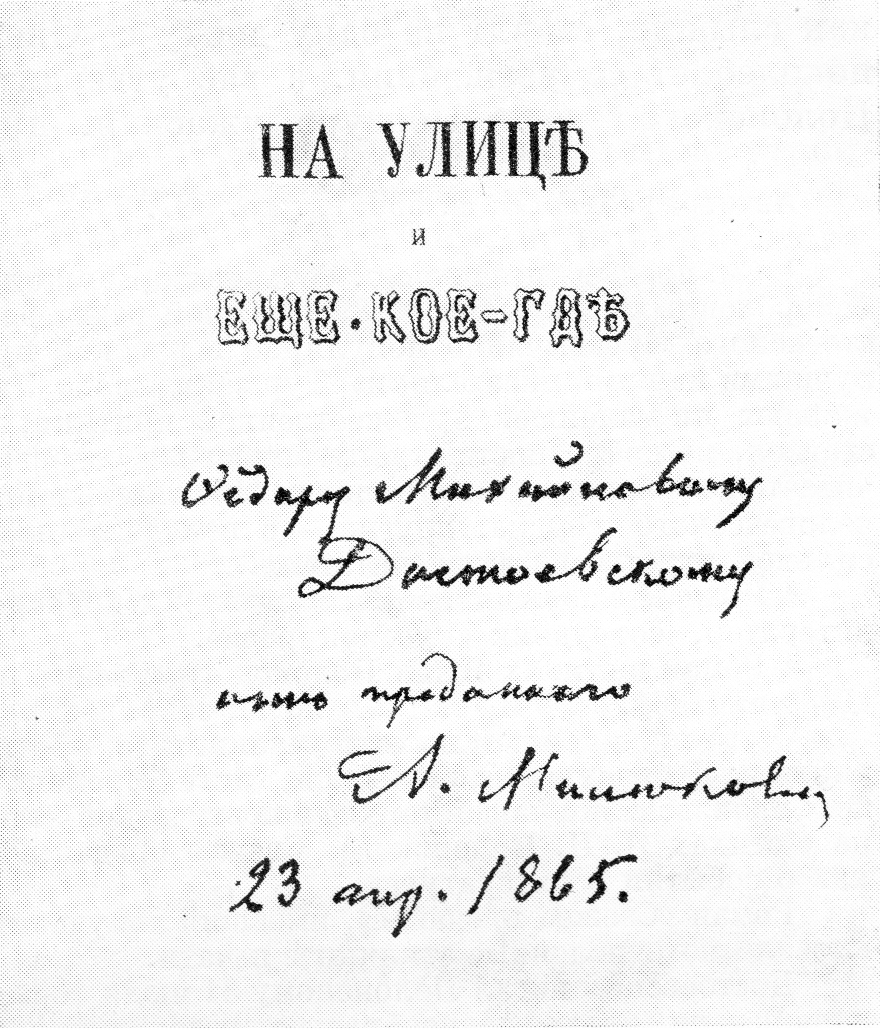
On the street and somewhere else with a gift inscription to F. M. Dostoevsky, 1865

1864 was an especially difficult year for both A. P. Milyukov and F. M. Dostoevsky. Both writers lost their wives that year. In January, A. P. Milyukov buried his wife Agnessa Petrovna, who had suffered from dropsy, according to M. M. Dostoevsky. A. P. Milyukov was left with daughters Lyudmila, Olga, and a young son, Boris (Biba). In April, Dostoevsky buried his wife Maria Dmitrievna Isaeva, who had been brought to St. Petersburg from Siberian exile. Furthermore, in July, Fyodor Dostoevsky also lost his older brother Mikhail, who had been responsible for publishing the magazine Epokha and had overseen the Dostoevsky family's tobacco factory.

A. P. Milyukov, in a letter to G. P. Danilevsky, described the circumstances of his friend's death in the following way: "Fyodor Mikhailovich was constantly with the sick man; I also visited him several times a day, as we lived five houses apart. This was a year marked by family tragedies: Fyodor Mikhailovich's wife died in the spring, then Mikhail Mikhailovich's daughter passed away, and in the summer, he himself died. You ask: who will be the main force behind Epoch? Of course, it will be Fyodor Mikhailovich and his former collaborators. However, I am not familiar with the magazine's affairs now and no longer take part in it. Recently, my article ‘Posthumous Notes of a Wanderer’ was published there, but it was given to Mikhail Mikhailovich. It seems I am regarded as not strong enough”.

An agent of the Third Division reported on 13 July 1864: "Nothing unusual occurred at the funeral of M. Dostoevsky, the former editor of the magazine Epokha. The deceased was accompanied to the cemetery by literary figures: Milyukov, Polonsky, Zotov, Maikov, and Miller. There were very few outsiders present. No one delivered a eulogy. Dostoevsky is buried in Pavlovsk”. Mikhail Dostoevsky left behind a large family without means of support. Fyodor Dostoevsky assumed responsibility for all the expenses related to his brother’s family, his stepson P. A. Isaev, as well as the debts from the failed magazine Epokha and the disrupted business at the tobacco factory.

Depressed by the misfortunes, Dostoevsky used the last of his money to travel to Europe, hoping, among other things, to improve his financial situation through gambling, particularly roulette. He undertook several literary projects, but he needed funds to complete them. In this difficult time, A. P. Milyukov continued to offer Dostoevsky his friendly support. The two writers maintained a lively correspondence. In these letters, Dostoevsky asked Milyukov to help secure a place for his upcoming novel Crime and Punishment either in P. D. Boborykin’s Library for Reading or in N. A. Nekrasov’s Contemporary. However, Milyukov was unable to place the novel in either of these publications. An attempt to have the novel published in Otechestvennye zapiski by A. A. Kraevsky also failed. Ultimately, the novel was published in Russky Vestnik, though without Milyukov’s involvement.

=== А. G. Dostoevskaya: conflict with the pochvenniks ===
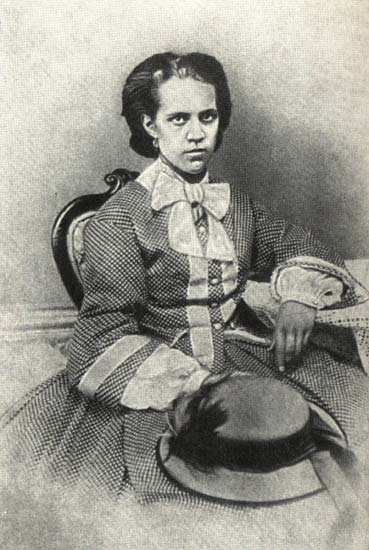
А. G. Dostoevskaya, photo of 1860s

The publication of the novel Crime and Punishment by M. N. Katkov solved only part of the writer's financial problems. There remained the obligation to the publisher F. T. Stellovsky to write a new novel of at least ten printed pages by November 1, 1866, otherwise Dostoevsky would be deprived of the right of ownership of his future works. On October 1, Dostoevsky complained to A. P. Milyukov that he had not written a line of the novel, having spent the previous months working on Crime and Punishment for Russky Vestnik. Milyukov offered Dostoevsky his help in writing a new novel, but Dostoevsky refused the offer.

Then Milyukov offered to find a stenographer for the writer to speed up the work, and Dostoyevsky, after hesitating, agreed — this way of working was unusual for him. Milyukov searched for a stenographer through his colleagues, and the search led to P.M. Olkhin, the head of the stenographer's course. Milyukov asked Olkhin to send one of his students to Dostoevsky, and the next day, October 4, one of his best students, twenty-year-old Anna Grigorievna Snitkina, came to Dostoevsky. The writing of the new novel began and continued until October 30, when the novel was finished.

At the end of the novel, according to the memories of A.G. Snitkina-Dostoevskaya, Fyodor Mikhailovich, to celebrate the successful completion of The Gambler, intended to give a dinner to AP Milyukov, AN Maykov and other friends. Anna Grigorievna herself was added to the number of these friends, but this novel with A.G. Snitkina did not end there. Soon the writer made an offer to the girl and received her consent for marriage[42]. A few months later, on February 15, 1867, there was a wedding of F. M. and A. G. Dostoevsky, which, except for A. P. Milyukov, was attended by his daughters Olga and Lyudmila; it was assumed that before the young will go with an icon godson F. M. Dostoevsky B. A. Milyukov — six-year-old Biba, but because of illness, he was absent at the wedding. The Milyukov sisters were also present at Dostoevsky's farewell on April 14, 1867, on a trip to Europe, from which the family returned only in 1871.

Relations between A.P. Milyukov and the Dostoevskys were spoiled by a frivolous article The Marriage of a Novelist in issue 34 of Syn Otechestva for February 1867, which was devoted to the marriage of the Dostoevsky couple. The article did not contain any insults, but described many unnecessary details from the personal life of the Dostoevskys, without directly naming the writer and his secretary, details that were known only to the people closest to the event, the article was written in a pamphlet tone: "The author was not thinking, his long hair was beginning to suffer considerably, and there were only two days left to finish the novel. He had already begun to think that it would be better to pay the fine, when suddenly his assistant, who until then had been quietly performing the duties of a stenographer, decided to advise the novelist to make his heroine aware that she shares the love that has been instilled in her ..." Dostoevskaya wrote, that she and her husband laughed at the note, and Fyodor Mikhailovich suggested that, judging by the vulgar tone of the story, the case was not without A. P. Milyukov, who knew her husband's habits well.

Dostoevsky's commentators argue that despite the long-lasting friendship between Dostoevsky and A.P. Milyukov, there was no real spiritual closeness between the two writers. To prove this, they refer to Dostoevsky's words about Milyukov's vulgar tone, the absence of Dostoevsky's letters to Milyukov from abroad in 1867–1871, harsh comments about Milyukov because of his relationship with his common-law wife Zinaida Valerianovna Narden and because of her bad attitude to his daughters Olga and Lyudmila Milyukov: "What is Milyukov like? He is good, there is nothing to say" (letter to E.F. Dostoevskaya dated June 1(13), 1867); "I heard about Milyukov a long time ago. What a poor child and what a strange man! Ridiculous and wicked. I would even wish that she Z. V. Narden robbed him" (letter to E. F. Dostoevsky dated October 11 (23), 1867), in letters to N. N. Strakhov and A. G. Dostoevskaya[42], though in a letter to A. E. Wrangel dated August 24 (September 5), 1865, Fyodor Mikhailovich called Milyukov a ''loyal man''.

Negative feelings about Alexander Petrovich were shared by A.G. Dostoevskaya, in her diary of May 27 (June 8), 1867, she left a very harsh review of Milyukov after reading her letter to O.A. Kashina:

I almost ran home and began to read the letter, and I do not know what became of me. I felt so sorry for poor, sweet Ludmilla, who had to endure so much from that mean man and that scoundrel Z. V. Narden. Oh, poor, poor girl! When Fedya came in, I told him everything. He began to read the letter, and he, too, became terribly indignant. He was sorry that he was not in St. Petersburg, because then he would have done something. He would have been ready to slap Milyukov or slap Nardin, even if he had to spend three months in prison for it. We feel very sorry for Ludmila. If I had money, I would send it to her immediately, so that she could at least live separately. What a terrible situation she is in! How I pity her! If it's all so bad for her, we'll take her in, if she agrees.

F. M. Dostoevsky's commentators do not reveal the reasons for the Milyukovs' family troubles, but they note that there is no precise data that it was A. P. Milyukov who wrote the pamphlet in Syn Otechestva magazine, it is only Dostoevsky's speculation. They suggest that the Dostoevsky brothers might have known about Alexander Petrovich's relationship with the twenty-six-year-old Z. V. Narden as early as November 1863, that is, when his living wife Agnessa Petrovna Milyukov died two months later, in January 1864. After the death of his wife, Milyukov separated from his adult daughters and lived in a civil marriage with Zinaida Valerianovna, who, according to A. G. Dostoevskaya, for some reason treated his daughters badly, and Alexander Petrovich himself did not object to this. In his memoirs about Dostoyevsky, Milyukov did not mention the estrangement between him and the Dostoyevsky family that occurred in connection with the newspaper article and the misunderstandings between Madame Nardin and his daughters. On the contrary, his memoirs are full of respect for the writer and his young wife. The characteristic humor of Milyukov was already described by Dostoevsky in 1849 during the interrogation of I. P. Liprandi before the Investigative Committee. Liprandi, and if the writer's guess about the author of the note in Syn Otechestva was correct, then it can be argued that in 1871 Fyodor Mikhailovich had a literary rendezvous with his former friend, giving some of Milyukov's character traits, mostly domestic and somewhat caricatured, to the character of the novel Demons:

Dostoevsky's condemnation of A.P. Milyukov's family life was accompanied by an ideological disagreement with him. "In the Russky Vestnik the criticism is frivolous, it is true, it falls into the tone of the general direction of the journal, but it is too superficial. In my opinion, your Pyotr Shchebalsky, has some resemblance to Milyukov", — wrote Dostoevsky Strakhov in 1870. Milyukov's ideological divergence from F. M. Dostoevsky also diverged from N. N. Strakhov's, as Strakhov's letter to Dostoevsky dated September 1, 1869 proves: "Aleksandr Petrovich Milyukov, as well as many others (it seems, however, all, not many), behaves badly <...> Milyukov is now in charge of the 'Syn Otechestva' and placed there very vile reviews of Zarya. At every meeting he cannot refrain from showing his hostility to me by some game. It has very little effect on me, but when this hostility enters the sphere of business, in which I am not the only one interested, it inspires me with very black thoughts about the human race". N. N. Strakhov wrote to Dostoevsky about Milyukov's condemnation of Strakhov's critical articles about Leo Tolstoy in Zarya: "Milyukov says to Maikov: "What nonsense Strakhov writes! He glorifies Tolstoy! I am surprised to find a magazine that prints such things". However, in 1871 F. M. Dostoevsky broke the silence and wrote a letter to Milyukov, but it was purely business, not a friendly message.

А. P. Milyukov was not the only friend of F.M. Dostoevsky who experienced all the difficulties of friendship with the great writer. At different times and on different occasions, A. N. Maykov, N. N. Strakhov and others fell out of favor with Dostoevsky. On the slope of the years, in 1916, Anna Grigorievna worked on the memoirs about Dostoevsky, and then she forgot about the former offenses against the "mean" Alexander Petrovich, the authority of Milyukov-friend of Dostoevsky came to her in the campaign of protest against the letter of N.N. Strakhov to Leo Tolstoy, accusing F. M. Dostoevsky in pedophilia: (Note: Some journalists, such as Alexander Nevzorov, like to use this topic to discredit Dostoevsky to this day.) "But even more striking to us in N. N. Strakhov's letter is this accusation of troublemaker. People who knew him intimately in his youth in St. Petersburg and in Siberia (A. P. Milyukov, St. D. Yanovsky, Dr. Rizenkampf, Bar A. E. Wrangel, and others), in their memoirs about Fyodor Mikhailovich, do not find a single hint of his depravity in those remote times".

By the end of the 1870s, the period of cooling between Dostoevsky and Milyukov had passed, as is evident from E.N. Opochinin's memoirs of Dostoevsky and Milyukov, the two writers visited each other as before, and Milyukov once introduced Opochinin to Dostoevsky. Immediately after Dostoevsky's death, in 1881, A. P. Milyukov published his memoirs about him in the magazine Russkaia Starina, in which he tried to hide his differences with Dostoevsky. Nevertheless, according to Dostoevskovedov, Milyukov's memoirs about Dostoevsky are an important and in many cases the only accurate source of biographical information about the life of the outstanding writer, despite, according to A.S. Dolinin, sometimes sinful efforts "to reconcile the views of early Dostoevsky with his later, pochvenniki's convictions".

5 letters from F. M. Dostoevsky to A. P. Milyukov for 1860-1867 and 2 letters from Milyukov to Dostoevsky for 1859 and 1870 have been preserved in the Russian State Library.

=== N. S. Leskov ===
N. Leskov met A. P. Milyukov in the late 1860s, when he was looking for a publisher for his essay The Mysterious Man about Arthur Benny. At that time, Milyukov was the editor of Syn Otechestva and dreamed of rallying the best literary talents for this newspaper. Milyukov had the highest opinion of Leskov's talent. Nevertheless, Leskov had to go through several publications, including Russky Vestnik by M. N. Katkov and Syn Otechestva by A. P. Milyukov, before finally placing the essay in 1870 in the newspaper Exchange Vedomosti, edited by K. V. Trubnikov. One way or another, the two writers became close. A. P. Milyukov became a frequent guest of Leskov, while Z. V. Narden formed a close friendship with Ekaterina Stepanovna Bubnova, Leskov's wife. Nikolai Semyonovich began attending Milyukov's "Tuesdays". Leskov's biographer A. I. Faresov recounts a story from one of Leskov's contemporaries: "I vividly remember the time when 'Bozhedomys' was being written. <…> At that time, a circle of literary artists gathered on Tuesdays at A. P. Milyukov’s, with whom Leskov was then friends. Attendees included A. N. Maykov, G. P. Danilevsky, Krestovsky, sometimes Dostoevsky, F. N. Berg, and Leskov himself, then a close ally of this Katkov circle. On one of these Tuesdays, where literary conversations customarily took place over tea, N. S. Leskov appeared with the manuscript of Bozhedomov, and everyone listened to the reading with pleasure".

The literary fate of this work (other titles: Starogorodtsy, Houring Water Movements, Soboryane) was far from easy. Leskov had to revise his chronicle several times, change the titles, and publish fragments in different editions. This led to a literary scandal. The publisher of the magazine Zarya, V. V. Kashpiryov, who had paid Leskov an advance for the future publication, accused him of fraud and violating the property rights of the manuscript. N. S. Leskov invited A. P. Milyukov, along with M. M. Stasiulevich, A. S. Suvorin, A. K. Tolstoy, and N. N. Strakhov, to serve as independent arbitrators in resolving the matter and defending the honor of the literati in the case surrounding the publication of his chronicle.

In 1871, N. S. Leskov invited Alexander Petrovich Milyukov to his home for an author's reading of Milyukov's story The Tsar's Wedding. In addition to Leskov himself, it was planned that M. I. Semevsky and Bishop Ephrem would attend the reading. From a diary entry by Leskov's brother, Vasily Leskov, dated 1 April 1871, it is noted: "In the evening at Nicholas’s, A. P. Milyukov read his novella. Milyukov read his tale from the times of Ivan Vasilievich Grozny, The Tsar's Wedding — about his third marriage to Sobakina. This piece is well-developed and full of interest, both in subject and details; it is evident that much labor and time have been invested in it. Among the literary men present were Bogushevich, Skavronsky (G. P. Danilevsky), S. I. Turbin, and Boborykin". N. S. Leskov recommended this story for publication to S. A. Yuriev, the editor of the Slavophile magazine Beseda, as well as to the editors of Russky Vestnik. Thanks to Leskov's persistent efforts, Milyukov's story was eventually published in Russky Vestnik. According to Leskov, the editor of Russky Vestnik, M. N. Katkov, “enamored Milyukov, and the latter was charmed by Mikhail Nikiforovich”.

Leskov urged the editors of Russky Vestnik to establish a permanent department of criticism, proposing either P. K. Shchebalsky or A. P. Milyukov as its head, though he favored Shchebalsky. He informed Shchebalsky that the publisher V. V. Komarov had invited both N. S. Leskov and A. P. Milyukov to join the new newspaper Russky Mir. Before long, the question of appointing an editor for Russky Mir arose, and A. P. Milyukov's candidacy came to the forefront once again. However, Leskov harbored doubts about Milyukov's suitability as an editor. In a letter to M. N. Katkov, Leskov conducted a comparative analysis of the two main candidates for the editor's position: A. P. Milyukov and V. G. Avseenko.

Of the two men —Avseenko or Milyukov— I am uncertain which would be more suitable. Avseenko is much more capable and clever, but he is unwell and cannot endure sleepless nights, which are unavoidable for an editor. Milyukov, on the other hand, is experienced and even-tempered, but I fear that under his direction, the paper might devolve into a mere reprint of Syn Otechestva. His approach closely mirrors the routine techniques of Golos. "Of course, they are both secret realists", but Avseenko possesses greater flair, better tact, superior writing skills, and genuinely independent views. Conversely, Milyukov has always been, and likely will always remain, under the influence of Andrei, who, though “not more corrupt,” is nonetheless controlling. On the other hand, Milyukov is more accommodating, while Avseenko is stubborn and prone to severing ties. Milyukov has a wide network of literary acquaintances, whereas people tend to avoid Avseenko — perhaps solely due to his unfriendly demeanor and cold manner.Would it not be better to consider someone entirely different from both of these candidates?

As can be seen from this characterization, Leskov considered Milyukov to be too liberal-minded for such a conservative publication as Russky Mir newspaper. This is why he recalled Milyukov's editorial work in Syn Otechestva and his collaboration with the liberal newspaper Golos of A. A. Kraevsky. Nevertheless, the second co-publisher of Russky Mir, General M. G. Chernyaev, dissatisfied with V. V. Komarov's work, ended his involvement and chose A. P. Milyukov as the new editor.

As his acquaintance with A. P. Milyukov deepened, Nikolai Leskov's attitude toward him became condescending. As A. N. Leskov writes, “Milyukov turns into a "gifted Milyuchka", unworthily "bleaching" something about his feelings for G. P. Danilevsky”. Despite this, their friendly relations remained intact. At Milyukov's request, in 1875, N. S. Leskov traveled to Paris in search of a certain Anatole, a distant relative of Z. V. Narden. In letters to Milyukov, Leskov shares his impressions of Paris, his experiences in France and Germany, and his ideas for the novel Damn Dolls. Leskov also offers advice to Milyukov—a professional educator—on how he should properly raise his spoiled fifteen-year-old daughter, Bibu. In St. Petersburg, Milyukov and Narden, as close friends, attended Leskov's house concerts, where Narden (or, as Leskov refers to her, Nardensha) performed chamber music on the piano. In 1877, N. S. Leskov separated from his wife, leaving with their son, A. N. Leskov. Milyukov and Narden then visited E. S. Bubnova, now without her husband.

On one hand, the two writers were divided by A. P. Milyukov's poor judgment of Leo Tolstoy's work, a view that was criticized by N. N. Strakhov. In 1875, N. S. Leskov wrote to Milyukov about a note in the newspaper Moskovskie Vedomosti: "And these gloomy people [the journalists of Moskovskie Vedomosti], with all their far-sighted calculativeness, will make a mistake, and this mistake will be shown to them by none other than the very many (and you) rejected invisible spirit of the people, about which Count Leo Tolstoy speaks most boldly and, in my opinion, best of all in War and Peace". However, Milyukov's attitude toward Tolstoy was complex and evolved over time. In his memoir essay A Trip to Yasnaya Polyana, G. P. Danilevsky refers to a fair comment by Milyukov, who compared Leo Nikolayevich to Homer. In 1880, in his article To the Portrait of Six Russian Writers published in the magazine Russkaya Starina, Alexander Petrovich wrote about the "artistic impartiality" of L. N. Tolstoy, depicting scenes of "epic struggle" "under the walls of our modern Troy”.

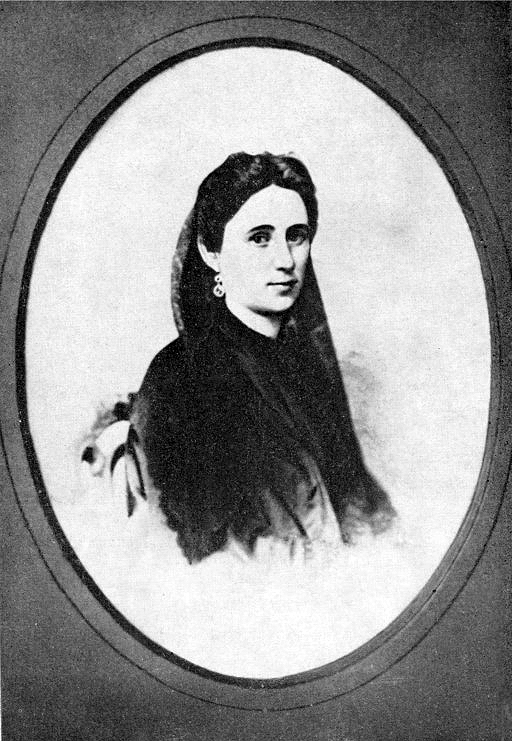
Ekaterina Stepanovna Bubnova, born Savitskaya, N. S. Leskov's wife

On the other hand, Milyukov was dissatisfied with Leskov's well-known haste in his work. He shared his thoughts on this with G. P. Danilevsky, to whom he confided his most intimate opinions. In a letter dated October 31, 1872, Milyukov discussed the qualities of Leskov's talent: "I, as probably many, was not just waiting for a good novel, but something very, very significant. <...> I sincerely tell you that I was anticipating the appearance of the novel as a bright celebration for our literature, when we would 'embrace each other' and congratulate ourselves on this great work, when our enemies would inwardly say: you have beaten us, Galilean! But the novel is printed, and my bright holiday turned out to be somewhat dim. Bozhedom did not meet my expectations". In explaining his opinion, the critic clarified that it was not a matter of any diminution or weakening of Leskov's talent, but rather a reflection of Milyukov's own demanding nature: to whom much is given, much is expected. Furthermore, Milyukov wrote that, in his opinion, "the novel lacks the slender integrity inherent in a work that emerged and matured organically from the seed of a single idea, rather than through the external linking of episodes to maintain coherence <...> In short, the novel did not turn out the way it should have". According to Alexander Petrovich, the key to overcoming the writer's haste would have been financial freedom and two or three years of unhurried, painstaking work on Soboriani. In 1880, Milyukov responded with a favorable review to the release of Leskov's stories Chertogon and Odnodum. However, in the following years, the correspondence between the two writers was lost.

=== A. N. Maykov ===
Apollon Maikov was a friend of Milyukov's from their time at St. Petersburg University (Maikov was not a philologist, but a law student). The young men were united by their love of poetry, and both were friends of Fyodor Dostoevsky. They also participated in the Petrashevsky meetings, were involved in the investigation into the case, and both escaped punishment. They lived long lives and died in the same year. A. N. Maikov dedicated a poem to his comrade, To A. P. Milyukov (On the Occasion of My 50th Anniversary, April 30, 1888). This is one of the few poems by the poet that reflects his personal life, particularly his memories of student years. Four years later, Apollon Maikov dedicated another piece to Milyukov, in which he ironically referred to his famous namesake, historian Pavel Nikolayevich Milyukov, the future leader of the Cadet Party and Russian Foreign Minister in the Provisional Government. In his work The State Economy of Russia in the First Quarter of the 18th Century and the Reform of Peter the Great (1892), Milyukov disputed the positive role of Peter the Great's reforms.

A. P. Milyukov, in his article Poet of Slavism, dedicated to the poetry of A. S. Khomyakov, discussed the poets of two opposing Russian parties: the ‘party’ of Khomyakov and the ‘party’ of Nekrasov, which represented the contrasting forces of Russian life. At the same time, in Russia, alongside the poets of these 'parties', there were those who stood outside the social circles. One such poet was A. N. Maikov. Milyukov wrote: "So Maikov, remaining true to his century, does not submit to any exclusive view, unlike Nekrasov, who is the representative of only one modern coterie. We do not mean to say that Maikov looked dispassionately at life or lacked his own outlook, his own specific public and socia idea, but we merely want to note that he drew content for his work from the full breadth of social life, from all sources of universal thought".

== Critical analysis of Essay on the History of Russian Poetry ==
=== First edition ===
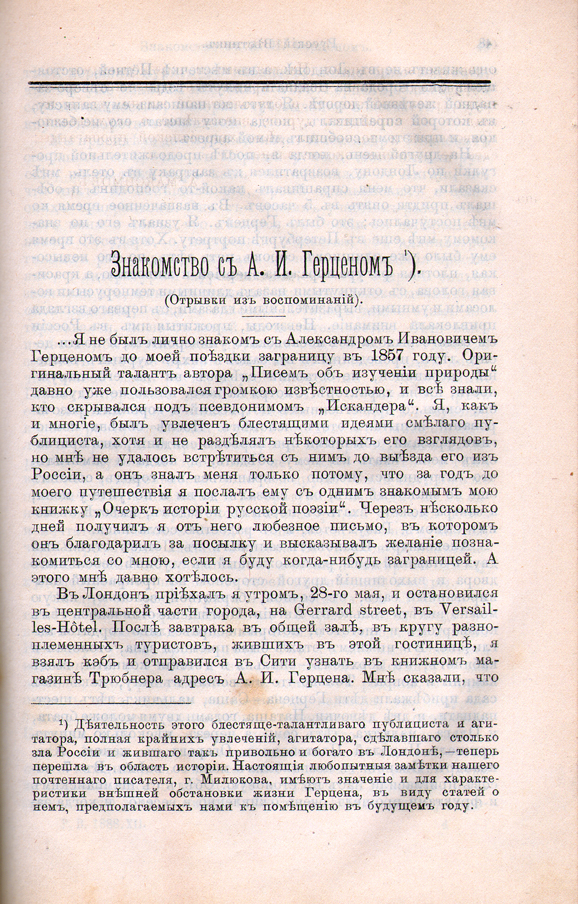
Memories about Herzen in Russky Vestnik, 1888

The first reviews of A. P. Milyukov's best critical book appeared in the October 1847 issues of Otechestvennye Zapiski and Sovremennik. The review in Sovremennik belonged to the pen of the friendly I. I. Vvedensky. Irinarch Ivanovich was the first to note the influence of V. G. Belinsky on the direction of A. P. Milyukov's work. “G. Milyukov is not at all like most of the historians of our literature. He is modern, he sympathizes with the latest interests, he has a view...” Vvedensky further pointed out that a similar view had been expressed even earlier “in the magazine articles of V. Belinsky, which contain a review of the activities of many of the most important representatives of Russian literature of different epochs”. The reviewer stipulates that there is a difference between Belinsky and his follower: the teacher had previously “said the same thing, only more consistently and more provably” than the student.

The conservative press, as one might expect, had a negative attitude toward A. P. Milyukov's work. The writer and educator V. T. Plaksin, in the magazine Finsky Vestnik, noted that Milyukov's work was characterized by harmful sectarianism, inspired by the direction of Otechestvennye Zapiski and Sovremennik. The Slavophile magazine Moskvityanin, in a review by conservative critic S. P. Shevyryov, rather sharply characterized A. P. Milyukov's book as dangerous, treacherous to Christian morality and religious writing. Particularly, S. P. Shevyryov's disagreement was caused by Milyukov's treatment of the image of Prince Igor, imbued with “noble heroism”, contrasted with the image of Dmitry Donskoy with his “insignificant” character. Shevyryov opposes Milyukov with his understanding of these images, polemically turned in the opposite direction: according to Shevyryov, Prince Igor embodies a Western type of personality, while Dmitry Donskoy is close to Shevyryov's ideal of Old Russian personality, “clothed personal will in the weapon of Faith, obedience to Providence and in self-denial”.

P. A. Pletnev wrote with judgment to Ya. K. Grot about Milyukov's work: “In it you see the fruits of Belinsky's teaching. It is an extract of all that was printed about Russian poets in Otechestvennye Zapiski. Three years later, another member of I. Vvedensky's circle —the editor of the Journal for Upbringing, A. A. Chumikov— in a letter to A. I. Herzen on August 9, 1851, wrote enthusiastically: “Have you read Milyukov's Essay on the History of Russian Poetry? It is the first experience of the history of opposition in Russia (printed in 1847) or, if you like, of revolutionary ideas. He praises there only those works which scourge Russia. He is a teacher, and for this book in 1849 he was dismissed from the gymnasium and from the cadet corps (Rostovtsev and Musin-Pushkin). It is, however, nothing else but the essence (summary) of Belinsky's ideas about Russian literature".

Evaluating Milyukov's work as a critic in the late 1840s, the Soviet literary critic A. Lavretsky blames him for the fact that Milyukov, being the author of the first systematized exposition of Belinsky's historical and literary ideas, did not belong to Belinsky's circle himself and did not take part in the magazine struggle to defend his ideas. The second defect of Milyukov, according to Lavretsky, consisted in the fact that after the publication of his Essay, Milyukov became an employee hostile to the party of Belinsky's magazine Library for Reading, “the malicious unprincipledness of which was well known to him,” notes the Soviet researcher. In his memoirs about his conversation with the editor of Biblioteka dlya Chteniya (Library for Reading), O. I. Senkovsky, who, in Lavretsky's words, had put ideelessness at the center of his principles, Milyukov told us “without any embarrassment”. Regarding the content of the book, Lavretsky calls Milyukov's blunder the periodization of Russian poetry into pre-Petrine and post-Petrine poetry, which are “two completely separate pictures.” Milyukov's mistake was also to evaluate Russian literature only in relation to the West, which Belinsky warned against.

Proceeding from all this, Lavretsky concludes that Milyukov was “a typical liberal-eclectic, who in his political views, in his entire intellectual and moral structure was alien to Belinsky and, of course, could not give a sufficiently accurate account of the historical and literary concept of Belinsky — an author so opposite to him”. In fact, Milyukov did not aspire to be only a diligent interpreter of Belinsky's ideas but was quite an independent critic.

=== Second edition ===
The criticism of the second edition of Milyukov's book, published in 1858, was the most extensive and conceptually diverse. Particularly, A. P. Milyukov's opinions on folklore, satirical literature, and Pushkin were criticized. The most detailed criticisms of Milyukov's book belonged to N. A. Dobrolyubov and A. V. Druzhinin. The contemporary critic Lev Anninsky believes that it was thanks to Dobrolyubov's review of Milyukov, not Milyukov's Essay, that Alexander Petrovich managed to remain in the history of literature: “destined to remain in the history of literature more than anything else by the fact that Dobrolyubov had time to ride him one of his reviews”. Dobrolyubov's conceptual article in the magazine Sovremennik was entitled On the Degree of Participation of Popularity in the Development of Russian Literature. Alexander Petrovich was not spared from Dobrolyubov's harsh criticism, even with Milyukov's reputation as an adherent of Belinsky. Dobrolyubov pays tribute to the role of Milyukov's Essay: “Following Belinsky's opinions on Russian literary phenomena, Mr. Milyukov then compiled an essay on Russian literature. Milyukov then wrote an essay on the development of Russian poetry, — and this sketch still does not lose its truth and importance”.

However, the main concept of Milyukov's book caused strong disagreement from the critic: “Then he found good only those phenomena of Russian poetry in which the satirical direction was expressed; and now he found nothing that could be praised in our country outside the satirical direction. Then he concluded his essay with the words of Lermontov: Russia is all in the future —and now concludes it with the same words... The expected future has not yet come for Russian literature, and the same present continues as it was ten years ago... We are still in the same Gogol period and vainly waiting so long for a new word: for it, it is true, has not yet developed content in life. But if there is nothing particularly noticeable in the inner content and character of literature, it is impossible not to see that outwardly it has developed quite significantly”.

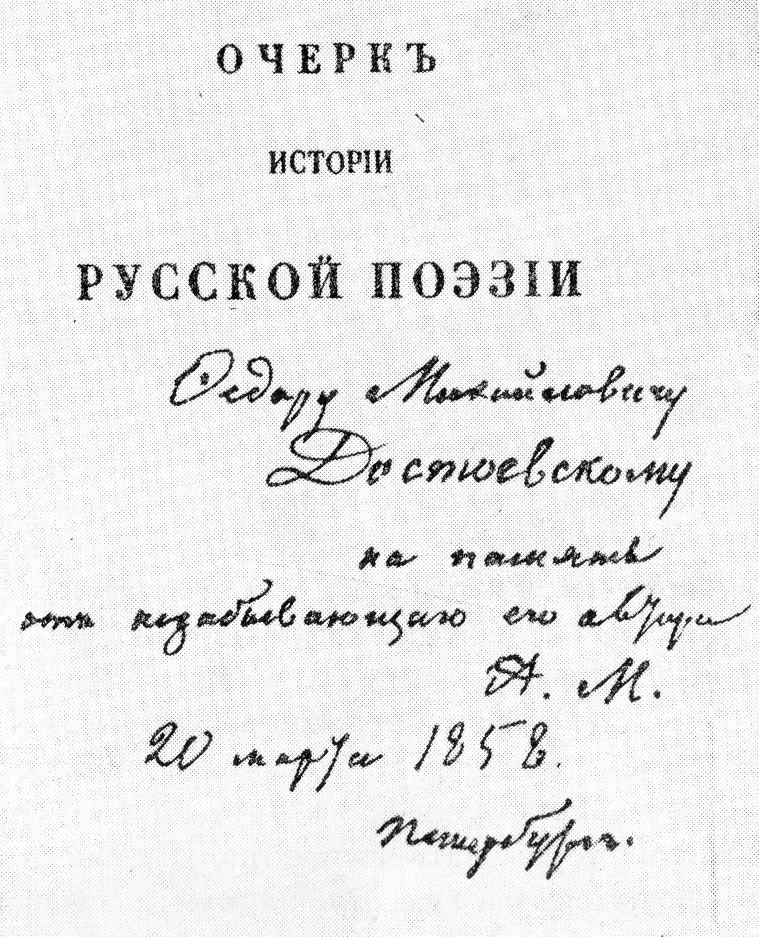
Second edition of Essay on the History of Russian Poetry (1858). Torn from the book with a gift inscription to exiled F. M. Dostoevsky

Dobrolyubov disagreed with Milyukov's excessive liberal reliance on the satirical, so-called “Gogol's” direction in Russian literature: “Satirical direction is, of course, good; who can argue about it? But why take such delight in it? Why attribute to it the correction of public morals? Why consider it as some kind of engine? It is worth taking a closer look at our satire to see that it preaches asses.” Disagreeing with the assessment of the role of satire before Gogol, the critic also disagreed with Milyukov's assessment of later satire: “For our part, we recognize only the fruitfulness of the satire of Lermontov, Gogol, and his school — and not in such enormous proportions as Mr. Milyukov represents”. Dobrolyubov's idea of the exaggerated importance of satire in the history of Russian literature was supported by A. V. Druzhinin. He wrote: “If we assume that satire by its greatness and importance exceeds all other elements of poetry, then all our concepts of the cause of good and enlightenment will be completely perverted”.

A. N. Pypin, N. A. Dobroliubov, A. V. Druzhinin, and A. A. Kotlyarevsky wrote about Milyukov's misinterpretation of the role of Russian folklore. Folklorist A. A. Kotlyarevsky, expressing his critical attitude toward the previously existing approach to folklore — its romantic idealization, which, in his opinion, should give way to “calm attention to the historical destinies of his fatherland” — reproached A. P. Milyukov for not revising his book for the second edition in accordance with the achievements of the new era. Kotlyarevsky observed that the old aesthetics “was replaced by a strict study of fact, under the influence of the life-giving method, which has long been used by natural science”. At the same time, the reviewer, a student of F. I. Buslaev and the Russian mythological school, focused primarily on the historical study of folk poetry in the “mythological aspect,” which he considered the only true and scientific approach. Kotlyarevsky identified the main drawback of the “zapadniki” as the indifference of liberal historians to the everyday life and culture of their own people. “Followers of its <liberal doctrine> everywhere see not the people, but the state; everything that comes from this beginning, they recognize as normal and legitimate,” he wrote.

A. A. Kotlyarevsky also disagreed with Milyukov's assertion that The Tale of Igor's Campaign can be attributed to “the last remnants of the heroic spirit brought to us by warlike Scandinavian natives”. Kotlyarevsky objected, stating that the Tale is an integral part of Russian folk poetry and that “the similarity, however great and striking it may be, does not yet prove the influence: it may come from prehistoric times, from the epoch of tribal unity...” He argued that The Tale is “from beginning to end imbued with folk mythology, belief, and tradition”.

The Soviet folklore researcher M. K. Azadovsky agrees with N. L. Brodsky, who raised the question of the legitimacy of considering A. P. Milyukov a disciple of V. G. Belinsky. According to Azadovsky, it is necessary to reconsider the attitude toward A. P. Milyukov as a follower of the revolutionary critic. Milyukov's adherence to Belinsky's principles is merely formal. In reality, Azadovsky believes, Milyukov should be considered a liberal interpreter of Belinsky's ideas, emasculating the revolutionary essence of the great critic's work. To support his point of view, the Soviet folklorist refers to the fact that Milyukov gave a negative characterization of Russian folk poetry. Azadovsky writes that, in Milyukov's opinion, Russian folk poetry reflected the dark sides of the then life of tsarist Russia. This was especially true of folk songs, although the same, but to a lesser extent, can be attributed to Russian folk tales. The difference, Azadovsky notes, is that in folk tales—like in epic poetry, which requires greater social development—all the shortcomings had to be expressed more clearly and even more vividly, showing the barrenness and coarseness of life at that time”.

Russian fairy tales, according to Milyukov, “show only unbridled fantasy, full of exaggeration and crudeness.” Bylinas, in turn, “only exaggerate material power and the poverty of mental life”. Folk humor, in Milyukov's view, is overly cynical, crossing the bounds of propriety, and so on. In other words, folk poetry reflected “the ugly state of our nationality,” Milyukov concluded, and was not a subject for idealization, as the Slavophiles engaged in. In the dispute about Russian folklore, Milyukov took the position of an extreme Westerner, while his opponents, A. A. Kotlyarevsky and A. N. Pypin, tried to avoid the extremes of both Western and Slavophile doctrines. Pypin, in his review of Milyukov's book, relied on the ideas of N. G. Chernyshevsky, his cousin. Chernyshevsky, on the other hand, saw the future of ethnography as a science focused on the basic elements of human culture. Pypin, by repeating the key points of Chernyshevsky, thus aligned himself with the modern “historical point of view, which in essence was a continuation of Belinsky's criticism”.

Like Kotlyarevsky, Pypin opposed both A. Milyukov's liberal Westernism and conservative Slavophilism. While Milyukov, in his work, assessed the merits of Russian folk poetry rather low, believing it to be a reflection of the unsatisfactory state of Russian nationality, Pypin thought quite differently. The problem with ancient Russian literature, according to Pypin, was that “folk epic did not become a source for written works”, as it did in other countries. The Tale of Igor's Campaign seemed to him outstanding only because it is inextricably linked with folk poetry, both in form and content. The scarcity of Old Russian writing, according to Pypin, lies “precisely in the estrangement from national motives, which alone could give literature freshness and strength”.

In the dispute about the role of Russian folklore, Dobrolyubov consistently opposed Milyukov on all points. The so-called “dark sides of folk poetry”, according to Dobrolyubov, do not lie in nationality or the everyday conditions of life, but are brought from outside. “Folk poetry, as it seems, long held its natural, simple character, expressing sympathy for ordinary suffering and joy, instinctively averting loud feats and magnificent phenomena of life, glorious and useless.” However, “with the invasion of the unknown people, the expectations of all turned, of course, to the princes... But it turned out that the princes exhausted their strength in the appanage feuds and did not know how to provide energetic resistance to the terrible enemies. Thus, the people were deceived by their princes. He involuntarily compared the present events with the legends of times past and sadly sang about the glorious, mighty bogatyrs surrounding Prince Vladimir...” Thus, the Tatar-Mongol yoke, Christianity fighting against folk poetry, and Byzantine influence were the factors that coarsened folk poetry. Dobrolyubov parallels Milyukov's book by offering his own analysis of the historical paths of Russian folklore: “The people have not frozen, have not sunk, the source of life has not dried up in them, but the forces living in them do not find a correct and free way out, and are forced to break their unnatural way and involuntarily find themselves noisy, crushing, often to their own destruction”.

Dobrolyubov also objected to the periodization of Pushkin's work, which, on the one hand, represented three stages: the first, imitating “Ariosto and the French poets of the eighteenth century”; the second, imitating Byron; and the third, an independent stage. In addition, Milyukov had another periodization of Pushkin's work, which was in irreconcilable contradiction with the first periodization. In the first period, Pushkin, according to Milyukov, “was a representative of social ideas and needs, although not so much by deep conviction and firm consciousness, as by temporary infatuation and youthful ardor; and therefore his first works were received with delight, despite their immaturity.” All this happened in spite of the allegedly imitative nature of Pushkin's works during these years, which had no connection with Russian reality. The second period marked Pushkin's rejection of the free-loving ideals of his youth—in favor of the ideas and interests of the social circle in which “his circumstances and way of life put him.” “And death spared him from the sad necessity of seeing himself as a living dead man in the midst of that society, which had previously applauded his every word,” concludes A. P. Milyukov.

At the same time, Milyukov's assessment of Pushkin's “Byronism” did not arouse doubts in Dobrolyubov, and he succinctly stated his view of it in the same article “On the Degree of Participation of Narodnost in the Development of Russian Literature”. According to Pushkinologists, Milyukov “in the assessment of Pushkin twice did not combine aesthetic and social criteria,” which was a consequence of the compilation of Alexander Petrovich's work, who did not notice these contradictions. Dobrolyubov's article was “a sharp criticism of the whole conception of the development of Russian literature of the new time, which was proposed by Milyukov”. “Strange, blatant, full of ingratitude verdict” on late Pushkin, as a ‘living dead man in the midst of society,’ also caused a storm of indignation in A. V. Druzhinin: “We owe too much to this dead man, owe him, perhaps, more than any of the people living and thriving in the world”.

Another famous critic, Apollon Grigoriev, the author of the famous formula “Pushkin is our everything,” in the work A Look at Russian Literature Since Pushkin's Death in the magazine Russkoye Slovo in 1859, wrote as follows: “He is our everything, I will not tire of repeating, I will not tire, first, because there are in our time critics, even historians of literature, who without the slightest shame of conscience declare that Pushkin died very opportunely, for otherwise, he would not have aligned with the modern movement and would have outlived himself”.

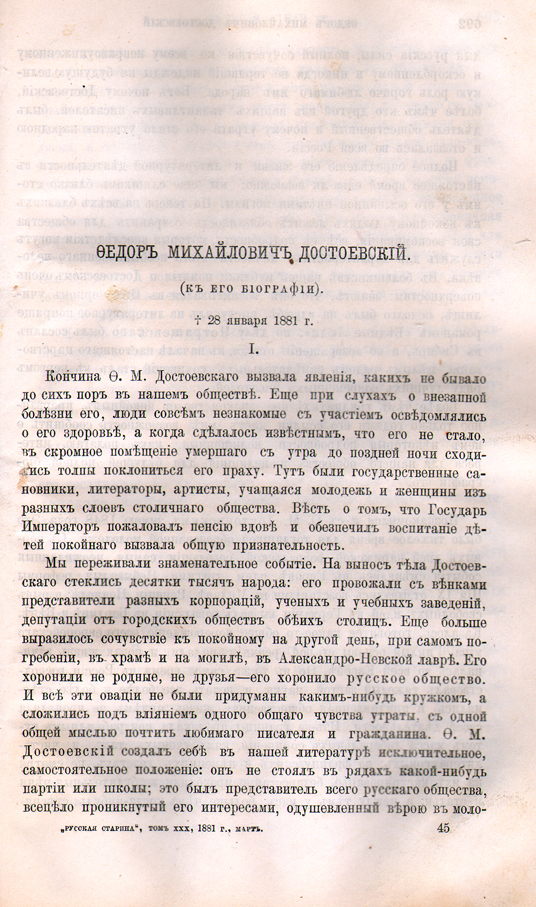
Memoirs of Dostoevsky in Russkaya Starina, 1881

Despite the harsh statements in his address, Milyukov, the next year, invited Grigoriev to his magazine Svetoch. The situation with A. V. Druzhinin was more complicated. Druzhinin was considered a supporter of the theory of “pure art.” The principles of the supporter of “pure art” determined his approach to A. P. Milyukov's book. Druzhinin was the editor of the magazine Library for Reading, and his editorial about Milyukov's book was programmatic in nature. The critic analyzed the reasons for Milyukov's assessments and tried to stand above the battle between the Slavophiles (N. P. Gilyarov-Platonov) and the zapadniki. Both opposing groups, Druzhinin reproached, for their party narrowness and lack of a large-scale view of Russian folklore, as a result of which both Slavophiles and Westerners were equally far from a true understanding of Russian folk poetry. Thus, the main reproach Druzhinin had against Alexander Petrovich consisted in the one-sided criticism of Milyukov, which eliminated from his work the question of the poetic properties of folk art. In the heat of the polemic, he failed to show the diversity and multidimensional nature of folk poetry and its enduring aesthetic value.

However, two years after the controversy, in 1860, the renowned educator V. I. Vodovozov wrote: "Mr. Milyukov's book is still the only attempt at a historical review of all our poetry, and, although it was not intended by the author as a guide for students, it has served as a resource for many in teaching Russian literature". The publication of the third edition of Milyukov's book in 1864 did not provoke as vigorous a discussion as in 1858. Summarizing the previously expressed opinions, the magazine Niva in the year of the writer's death concluded: "A specialist in Russian literature, he is known for his book Essay on the History of Russian Poetry, published in 1847, which for half a century served as a guide for young students to familiarize themselves with Russian literature and still occupies an honorable place in pedagogical literature. In this first serious work, Milyukov demonstrated remarkable critical insight, a deep understanding of the tasks of criticism, and no small degree of independence in evaluating authors".

While Soviet critics denied Milyukov the right to be considered a follower of V. G. Belinsky, critics of the late 19th century made the opposite claim. For example, S. A. Vengerov, author of the Critical and Biographical Dictionary of Russian Writers and Scientists from the Beginning of Russian Education to Our Days (1889), wrote: "Milyukov slavishly follows Belinsky, and the misunderstanding of folk poetry, as we know, is one of the great flaws of the renowned critic." In other words, Milyukov was criticized both for insufficient adherence to Belinsky's ideas and for excessive divergence from them.

== Critical speeches in 1850s-1880s ==
=== N. V. Gogol ===
Throughout his life, Milyukov repeatedly turned to the work of Gogol. In Essay on the History of Russian Poetry, the critic compares Gogol's influence on the development of Russian literature with Dickens in English literature and prefers Gogol: “But the Russian poet, not inferior to the English novelist in knowledge of life and artistic creation of characters, surpasses him in the consciousness of social ideas, in the depth of view of society, and in the warmth of humanistic love for people”. The best works of Gogol, according to the critic, are Dead Souls, The Government Inspector, and Taras Bulba. However, Taras Bulba, Milyukov believes, suffered in the second edition from the author's remodeling “in a Homeric spirit.” But both Taras Bulba and The Government Inspector are inferior to Dead Souls “in the deep idea, faithful painting creation of manners, artistic creation of characters, and the national idea.” Gogol's best work “belongs to the few great creations of our poetry, of which it can justly be proud".

Among other works by Gogol, Alexander Petrovich was also particularly interested in the problem of the vitality of Gogol's The Government Inspector. The critic wrote about it in his memoirs of his meeting with Gogol and Bryullov in a carriage on the Tsarskoselskaya railroad. This is also the subject of the essay Modern Impostors, about events that happened in the 1860s. The memoirist-critic described in the essay how he witnessed a heated argument about the reality of Gogol's plot. “Well, why would it seem necessary, in our time, to interpret such an old question, which for decades has been discussed by critics and the public alike? Meanwhile, the dispute dragged on for almost an entire evening”. The circle of disputants included quite respectable people, familiar not only with literature but also with ordinary Russian life: “students, officers, a doctor, a teacher from some public institution, and three or four ladies who read magazines all the time”.

At the same time, only two or three people expressed doubts about the realism of Gogol's plot. “The rest of society declared that such a case is a phenomenon that is not only possible, but not at all exceptional, even commonplace, naturally arising from the structure of our life”.Milyukov cites several accounts of the exploits of contemporary Khlestakov-like characters, which ultimately convince skeptics “of the possibility of the plot and denouement of The Inspector.” They seem to have ceased to doubt that such hoaxes occur in our country, not only in provincial backwaters but near the center, and even in the very center of our domestic civilization.

=== I. A. Goncharov ===
Alexander Petrovich opened his critical speeches in the magazine Svetoch with an analysis of the novel Oblomov. Literary scholar V. A. Nedzvetsky, in connection with Milyukov's speech, describes his position as close to that of the pochvenniks, despite the fact that Alexander Petrovich was never part of that movement in the full sense of the term. By the middle of the 1860s, Milyukov's literary circle had shaped the ideological platform of pochvennichestvo (soil-vennism). However, this movement was primarily developed by Fyodor Dostoevsky, Nikolai Strakhov, and Apollon Grigoriev, while Milyukov had begun writing his article on Oblomov even before Dostoevsky's return from exile in Siberia. Milyukov underwent an ideological evolution from a Westerner to a very moderate liberal. In a letter to G. P. Danilevsky, he admitted that the true pochvenniks (Dostoevsky and Strakhov) regarded his ideological foundations with suspicion: “I seem to be considered there not strong enough soil”.

Goncharov's novel elicited a number of fundamental criticisms from Milyukov. According to Nedzvetsky, the critic refused “to accept <...> Olga Ilyinskaya as a living, real person.” Milyukov questions whether Olga could have truly reciprocated Oblomov's feelings. In his novel, did Goncharov convincingly motivate his heroine's affection for Ilya Ilyich? A. P. Milyukov denies such a possibility: “Let us suppose that the girl was somehow interested in this sleepy and decrepit nature; but it could only be a momentary whim, a caprice of the head and imagination, not the passion of the heart. Is it possible that an intelligent and educated girl could, for long and constantly, love a man who incessantly yawns in her presence and makes it clear at every step that for him love was only a tough service?” A modern researcher believes that in this matter, Milyukov is mistaken, asserting that Olga had sufficient motives for the manifestation of her feelings. Another character in Oblomov—Stoltz—also received a negative characterization. The critic accused Stoltz of caring only “about his own career without any love for his half-breed country.” Nedzvetsky agrees with Milyukov's opinion that Goncharov, like many other Russian writers, failed to creatively and convincingly “create a positive type that has always failed us”.

Literary critic M. V. Otradin notes that Milyukov, “unlike many who wrote about Oblomov, <...> saw in the novel a slander on Russian life”. Objecting to N. A. Dobrolyubov, Milyukov wrote: “To those who see only ‘Oblomovshchina’ in all our modern society, we will point to Peter, Lomonosov, Dashkova, Pushkin”. Milyukov “for the first time expressed a special view, which later gained some dissemination, of Goncharov's prose—a view that hurt the novelist himself.” In the author of Oblomov, critics saw only a brilliant descriptor of everyday life and nothing more. According to Milyukov, Goncharov was a writer who could be placed alongside Gogol in the artistic vividness of his works, but the main characters in the novel, the central idea of his work, and his interpretation of Russian reality were fundamentally flawed. The story of Ilya Oblomov, according to Milyukov, was merely an isolated case of ill health, while the apathy of Russian society as a whole was, in his view, the result of “external oppression.” Thus, the critic concludes, if oppression were removed, apathy would naturally disappear. In the Russian Empire during the era of Alexander's reforms, Milyukov saw all the prerequisites for this.

Researchers note that many critics of the novel (Milyukov among them) agreed on one point: Oblomov's fate was correlated by Goncharov with the fate of Russia as a whole. Milyukov was the first to elevate the type of Oblomov to the hero of Apollon Maikov's poem Two Fates — Vladimir, a character of the Onegin-Pechorin-Rudin category of “superfluous people”. While Milyukov found in people of this type “a living force, spoiled only by the environment and life”, he believed that “...laziness and apathy in Oblomov occur not so much from education as from the unfitness of his very nature, from the shallowness of mental and psychic forces.” However, literary scholar A. G. Tseytlin disagrees with this assessment: “Ilyusha, during his childhood and even youth, is not at all a ‘shallow’ soul. He has a lively, receptive, and dreamy character, avid curiosity, and so on”. Commentators also find Goncharov's likening of Oblomov to Vladimir too straightforward and unjustified. They describe Vladimir as “an all-disbelieving and cynical hero of the last chapter of Maikov’s poem.” Scholars of Goncharov argue that, in comparing the two characters, “the critic is too soft on the desolate misanthrope of Maikov’s poem and too harsh on the delicate and cordial Ilya Ilyich Oblomov”.

The Dostoevsky brothers' magazine Vremya, in an anonymous article titled “Gavan Officials at Home, or Galyornaya Harbor at Any Time of Day and Year. (Landscape and Genre) by Ivan Gensler”, attributed by commentators to Apollon Grigoriev, supported A. P. Milyukov's opinion of I. A. Goncharov's novel. According to A. A. Grigoriev, Milyukov's analysis of the novel Oblomov can be described as “beautifully written”.

Reflecting on the character of I. A. Goncharov's humor, Milyukov concludes: “But this is not the humor of Gogol, which leaves behind a painful feeling of indignation and bile, but a humor full of good-naturedness and graceful gentleness”. I. A. Goncharov also served as the censor for the second edition of A. P. Milyukov's book, Essay on the History of Russian Poetry (St. Petersburg, 1858).

=== I. S. Turgenev ===
Milyukov met Turgenev in February 1859. On March 10, he wrote to L. N. Vaksel: “The other day I visited Turgenev (whom I had met before Maslenitsa)”. Alexander Petrovich followed Turgenev's work and returned to evaluating his works more than once. In the same letter to Vaksel, he wrote: “He printed the novel Home of the Gentry. This is one of his best works. For the last month, everyone has been talking about it...” On the eve of the release of the novel Fathers and Children, the critic reported to G. P. Danilevsky: "The reading public awaits with subservience the appearance of a new novel by Turgenev, brought by him from Paris in Russky Vestnik". This phrase can reflect both Milyukov's dislike of Turgenev's work and the manifestation of the journal's struggle for "its" reader. Researcher I. T. Trofimov calls Milyukov a talented critic and historian of literature, noting that his literary assessments are often controversial and contradictory. As an example of such contradictions, Trofimov points to Milyukov's underestimation of the genius of L. N. Tolstoy and M. E. Saltykov-Shchedrin, as well as his skeptical attitude toward the works of Turgenev in the 1860s, despite offering obligatory praise for the "venerable novelist" himself.

The reserved attitude toward Turgenev's work is reflected in Milyukov's letter of December 24, 1871: “They say Turgenev has written a new novel, but if this is true, one can hardly expect anything good. His latest novels have shown that he has fallen behind Russian life.” This opinion about Turgenev was common in Russian criticism in the 1870s. The more surprising, says I. T. Trofimov, is to learn from Milyukov his flattering opinion of Turgenev's works from the 1880s, Song of Triumphant Love and Klara Milich, which received controversial assessments in Russian criticism: “The new story by I. S. Turgenev, Klara Milich, does not address any contemporary issue and does not touch any evil of the day. It belongs to that kind of art, which is rejected by the entire direction of Vestnik Evropy: there is no tendency in it.” This judgment does not mean praise for Turgenev, but it contains a certain reassessment of views on the work of the Russian writer-emigrant, from whom much had been expected in terms of topical “ideological” prose in the “ideological” organ that was the liberal monthly Vestnik Evropy”.

Turning to the text of the story, Milyukov draws the following conclusion: Turgenev presented his readers “with those poetic patterns that give the simplest plot a vital charm. Despite a certain eccentricity in the characters and the fantastic exclusivity in the denouement of the story, it attracts readers with its details and the independence of view, peculiar to true talent. Admirers of Turgenev will find this story especially pleasing, as proof that our novelist, despite his years and prolonged illness, has not yet lost his talent”.

Speaking of Song of Triumphant Love, Milyukov considers two groups of critics of Turgenev's work. The first group, according to Milyukov, believes that “Turgenev, having lost his once inherent sensitivity to the lively social interests and pressing issues of our time, has finally outlived his talent and will no longer attract anyone with tales in the fantastic genre....” While the second group of critics believes that Turgenev's view of Russia from a beautiful distance “does not allow him to closely follow the phenomena of Russian life, proof of which is his Smoke and Nov,” so “now the only way out for the talent of our novelist may be to turn to the pure realm of fiction”. In contrast to the opinions of such critics, Milyukov suggested bypassing the question of whether Turgenev had really lost his understanding of the real course of Russian life. The writer's turn to medieval Italian legend did not necessarily mean a loss of his interest in Russian reality. “His Song of Triumphant Love is evidently nothing more than a light sketch, sketched in his spare time, alongside another, more significant work”. And though there is no clearly expressed idea, the story is quite original and not without interest: “In the staging of faces and some scenes, one can see the fine pen of a gifted artist familiar to Russian readers”. At the same time, Milyukov defended Turgenev against reproaches of cynicism in his work: “In Song of Triumphant Love, there is as little cynicism as, for example, in Pushkin's Rusalka”.

In his obituary of P. I. Melnikov-Pechersky, Milyukov mentioned Turgenev along with the most prominent representatives of Russian literature: “Together with Goncharov, Turgenev, Pisemsky, and Count L. Tolstoy, he, P. I. Melnikov (Andrei Pechersky), serves as one of the representatives of the artistic school that familiarized Russian society with various aspects of its life and illuminated its inner meaning”.

== Contemporary views ==
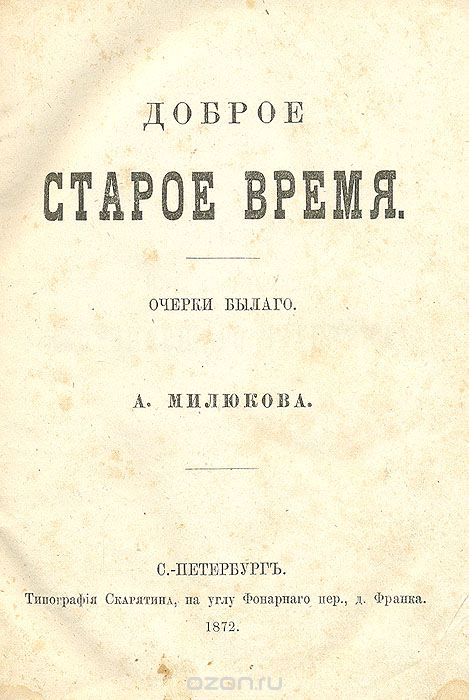
The Good Old Times, 1872

According to contemporaries, Alexander Petrovich Milyukov had an unimpressive appearance: he was short in stature and of frail build. At the same time, he had a soft, kind, sympathetic character, which earned him the affection of friends and students. One of them, a pupil of the Second St. Petersburg Gymnasium, writer and traveler Boris Korzhenevsky (pseudonym Veschiy Bayan), left a verbal portrait of Milyukov in his memoirs Our Teacher, published in Zhurnal dlya Vsekh in 1899. Korzhenevsky described his teacher as follows: “a strange, kind, lively old man,” “thin, small in stature, gray-haired, with an intelligent open face, a large forehead, which seemed even higher from a huge bald spot, with smoothly combed temples, a quiet, meek, and thoughtful smile, and bright, lustrous eyes, not in the manner of senile ones, but alive”. The memoirist recalled his grammar school years, when he and his comrades were 13–15 years old, carefree pranksters, full of life and excitement, and little inclined to listen to others. “But before this mentor, we were in awe. We all loved him, even Vasya Kozlov, who tortured cats at home and was said to have an evil heart...” “He was the first and... the last to ennoble us in the cold gymnasium walls, and since then, we obediently and lovingly followed his call, imperious and captivating, listening with awe to his strange speeches...”

In turn, A. P. Chekhov called Korzhenevsky's reminiscences of Milyukov a poem (they were indeed written in rhythmic prose) and recommended that they be published in the magazine Zhizn.

N. G. Chernyshevsky, who met with A. P. Milyukov at I. I. Vvedensky, wrote to M. I. Mikhailov: “Milyukov Alexander Petrovich, who usually writes in Otechestvennye zapiski reviews, is a glorious man <...> Gorodkov, Ryumin, Milyukov are worth getting acquainted with”. But the attitude toward Milyukov underwent changes: “This Milyukov speaks in a socialist spirit, as I say, but it seems to me that it is not his conviction, as Ir. Iv. or me, that his heart does not stir when he speaks of it, and so it is only he who speaks it". However, later Chernyshevsky's cool attitude toward Milyukov was changed by the latter's book Essay on the History of Russian Poetry and the recommendation of G. R. Gorodkov. After this, Chernyshevsky spoke of Alexander Petrovich in this way: “A really decent man”.

According to F. M. Dostoevsky's testimony to the investigating commission in the Petrashevsky case: “Milyukov, it seemed to me, was loved by everyone for his cheerful and good-natured character; moreover, he is a master of telling jokes – and these are his main features”[94], “he can tell a good story and make himself listen”.

A. G. Dostoevskaya's opinion about her first meeting with Milyukov, recorded in her diary of 1867, but retrospectively describing the events of October 1866, when she was still timid in front of F. M. Dostoevsky's friends: “Once there was also Milyukov, whom I did not like very much. He is a small, rippled old man, (Note: А. P. Milyukov was not yet fifty years old at that time.) very poisonous. He bowed to me very respectfully, and Fedya introduced me to him as a stenographer. He also asked me if I was not a relative of the poet Snitkin, who had recently died in Maximilian's hospital. I answered that I was not. They walked around the room for some time, talking politics. Then he left and I never saw him again.” The memoirist wrote that, except for A. P. Milyukov, A. N. Maykov, and I. G. Dolgomostyev, no one came to Dostoevsky during her work on the manuscript of the novel The Gambler. She reported on the reason for the inconvenience of her work at Dostoevsky's apartment: “I was very happy about Milyukov's departure because I still did not want to be seen by very many people at his place, since he is a widowed man, and people are so angry that they would certainly begin to say that we have something between us that is not clean”. Later, in Memories, A. G. Dostoevskaya wrote about Milyukov more restrainedly, but her attitude toward him never became favorable. A somewhat ironic, but rather favorable opinion of E. N. Opochinin about A. P. Milyukov refers to the time of 1887–1888.

He is a small, thin old man, dressed in some dark, open-fronted business card and very old-fashioned light gray pants. His bare skull is framed only on the back of the head and on the temples with gray hairs, bushy gray eyebrows, under which small but lively eyes shine. A thick, completely white mustache and the entire wrinkled face eloquently tell that many decades rest on the shoulders of Alexander Petrovich. As a detail that completes this typical figure of the forties, he holds a pipe with an arching cherry chibouk. He puffs it, characteristically holding the pipe with a bent index finger, and the blue smoke rises up and floats in the room. <...> Milyukov has secluded himself with Danilevsky and is having a quiet conversation with him in a corner. The cunning old man is taking great care of the starry-eyed editor of the Pravitelstvenniy Vestnik. He obligingly puts a slice of fresh lemon in his tea, pours rum, and offers him a cookie. After all, A. P. Milyukov is hardly the most prolific employee of the Pravitelstvenniy Vestnik in the bibliography department: every week, the newspaper publishes four hundred or five hundred lines of his articles, or even more, and so all year round, and at a hryvenny per line, it amounts to five to six thousand dollars a year. Well, the old man can live.

In her documentary novel Counting to One: Fyodor Dostoevsky Under the Burden of Passion and Reflection (1984), Soviet writer Dora Bregova used the contradictory image of Milyukov in the speech characterisation of Apollon Grigoriev to describe the latter's drunken lifestyle. Grigoriev, in a drunken rage, says to Dostoevsky: "But in my opinion it is better to drink than to lead such a virtuous life as that old b..., our dear Alexander Petrovich Milyukov". As a matter of fact, A. P. Milyukov's connection with Z. V. Narden was known a year before A. A. Grigoriev's death in 1864. The writer Igor Volgin, in order to create an image of the uncompromising and impulsive Dostoevsky-Petrashevets, emphasises, among other qualities of Milyukov-Petrashevets, his law-abiding and prudence.

== Bibliography ==
=== Books ===
- Очерк истории русской поэзии [Essay on the History of Russian Poetry] (in Russian). СПб.: В типографии военно-учебных заведений. 1847. p. 227. Archived from the original on 26 December 2017.
- Очерк истории русской поэзии [Essay on the History of Russian Poetry] (in Russian). СПб.: Типография Э. Веймара. 1858. p. 236.
- Очерк истории русской поэзии [Essay on the History of Russian Poetry] (in Russian). СПб.: Издание книгопродавца и типографа М. О. Вольфа. 1864. p. 280.
- "Очерки Финляндии". Путевые записки А. Милюкова: 1851—1852 г. [Travel notes of A. Milyukov: 1851-1852] (in Russian). Санкт-Петербург: В типографии Академии наук. 1856. p. 220.
- "Афины и Константинополь". Путевые записки А. Милюкова 1857 года [A. Milyukov's travel notes of 1857] (in Russian). СПб.: В типографии Рюмина и комп. 1859. p. 216. Archived from the original on 26 December 2017.
- История литературы древнего и нового мира [History of Literature of the Ancient and New World] (in Russian). Vol. [1]-2. Санкт-Петербург: тип. Д. И. Калиновского. 1862. p. 21.
- Путевые впечатления на севере и юге [Travel experiences in the north and south] (in Russian). СПб.: Изд-во М. О. Вольфа. 1865. p. 496.
- "На улице и ещё кое-где". Листки из памятной книжки [Sheets from the memorial book] (in Russian). СПб. 1865. p. 242.
- Путевые впечатления на севере и юге [Travel experiences in the north and south] (in Russian). Санкт-Петербург: Издание М. О. Вольфа. 1865. p. 496. Archived from the original on 26 December 2017.
- «Доброе старое время». Очерки былого ["The Good Old Days". Essays on the past]. Библиотека современных писателей (in Russian). СПб.: В типографии Скарятина. 1872. p. 266.
- Рассказы и путевые воспоминания [Stories and travel memoirs]. Библиотека современных писателей (in Russian). Vol. 19. Санкт-Петербург: Типография А. Ф. Базунова. 1873. p. 345.
- «Летние поездки по России»: Записки и путевые письма А. Милюкова [“Summer Travels in Russia: Notes and Travel Letters of A. Milyukov]. Библиотека современных писателей (in Russian). Vol. 24. Санкт-Петербург: Тип. А. Ф. Базунова. 1874. p. 289.
- Рассказы из обыденного быта (на улице и ещё кое-где) [Everyday life stories (on the street and elsewhere)] (in Russian). Санкт-Петербург; Москва: Издание М. О. Вольфа. 1875. p. 342.
- «Царская свадьба». Былина о государе Иване Васильевиче Грозном [“The Tsar's Wedding”. Bylina about the Emperor Ivan Vasilyevich the Terrible] (in Russian). Санкт-Петербург; Москва: Издание М. О. Вольфа. 1873. p. 302.
- Жемчужины русской поэзии. Сборник лучших произведений русских поэтов [Pearls of Russian poetry. Collection of the best Russian poets' works] (in Russian). СПб.: Издание М. О. Вольфа. 1874. p. 620.
- Отголоски на литературные и общественные явления. Критические очерки [Echoes on literary and social phenomena. Critical Essays] (in Russian). СПб.: Типография Ф. С. Сущинского. 1875. p. 232.
- Рассказы из обыденного быта (на улице и ещё кое-где) [Everyday life stories (on the street and elsewhere)]. Дорожная библиотека (in Russian). Санкт-Петербург: Издание А. С. Суворина. 1886. p. 324.
- Царская свадьба: Былина о государе Иване Васильевиче Грозном [The Tsar's Wedding: Bylina about Tsar Ivan Vasilyevich Grozny]. Дорожная библиотека (in Russian). Санкт-Петербург: Издание А. С. Суворина. 1886. p. 288.
- Литературные встречи и знакомства [Literary meetings and acquaintances] (in Russian). СПб.: Тип. А. С. Суворина. 1890. p. 281.
- Царская свадьба: Былина о государе Иване Васильевиче Грозном [The Tsar's Wedding: Bylina about Tsar Ivan Vasilyevich the Terrible]. Зелёная библиотека (in Russian). Санкт-Петербург; Москва: т-во М. О. Вольф. 1897. p. 302.

=== Magazine articles ===
- Русская апатия и немецкая деятельность. Роман И. Гончарова «Обломов» [Russian apathy and German activity. The novel I. Goncharov's novel “Oblomov”] (in Russian). Светоч. 1860. pp. 3–38.
- Мёртвое море и взбаламученное море. (Разбор романа г. Писемского) [The Dead Sea and the Stirred Sea. (Parsing Pisemsky's novel).] (in Russian). Голос. 1863.
- Вопрос о малороссийской литературе [The Question of Little Russian Literature] (in Russian). Эпоха. 1864.
- Листки из памятной книжки [Leaflets from the memorabilia book] (in Russian). Время. 1863.
- Посмертные записки одного скитальца [The posthumous notes of a wanderer] (in Russian). Эпоха. 1864.
- «Из воспоминаний». Знакомство с О. И. Сенковским [“From Memories”. An acquaintance with O. I. Senkovsky] (in Russian). Исторический вестник. 1880. pp. 150–158.
- Сад Монрепо под Выборгом [Monrepo Garden near Vyborg] (in Russian). Нива. 1880.
- Ф. H. Глинка. [Некролог] [F. N. Glinka. [Obituary]] (in Russian). Исторический вестник. 1880.
- Былое. Стихотворения В. Буренина. С.-Петербург, 1880. Рецензия [The passed by. Poems by V. Burenin. St. Petersburg, 1880. Review] (in Russian). Исторический вестник. 1880. pp. 854–858.
- Встреча с Гоголем [Meeting Gogol] (in Russian). Исторический вестник. 1881. pp. 135–138.
- К воспоминаниям о Ф. М. Достоевском (Рассказ очевидца) [To Memories of F. M. Dostoevsky (Eyewitness account)] (in Russian). Одесский вестник. 1881.
- Фёдор Михайлович Достоевский. К его биографии [Fyodor Mikhailovich Dostoevsky. To his biography] (in Russian). Русская старина. 1881. pp. 691–708.
- Полное собрание сочинений князя П. А. Вяземского [Complete Works of Prince P.A. Vyazemsky] (in Russian). Vol. IV and V. СПб.: Исторический вестник. 1881. pp. 679–681.
- Род дворян Демидовых. Рецензия [The Demidov noble family. Review] (in Russian). Исторический вестник. 1881. pp. 662–664.
- "Русский путешественник" за границей в прошлом веке». (1771—1773) [“Russian Traveler" abroad in the last century. (1771-1773)] (in Russian). Vol. 6. Исторический вестник. 1881. pp. 5–27.
- Образцы новой русской словесности, применительно к курсу средних учебных заведений. Пушкинский период до Гоголя включительно. Рецензия [Samples of new Russian literature, as applied to the course of secondary schools. Pushkin's period up to and including Gogol. Review] (in Russian). Исторический вестник. 1882. pp. 235–237.
- Лирические малорусские песни, преимущественно свадебные. Рецензия [Lyrical Malorussian songs, mostly wedding songs. Review] (in Russian). Исторический вестник. 1882. pp. 475–476.
- А. А. Григорьев и Л. А. Мей. (Отрывок из воспоминаний) [А. A. Grigoriev and L. A. Mey. (An excerpt from the memoirs)] (in Russian). Исторический вестник. 1883. pp. 98–109.
- Жизнь и поэзия В. А. Жуковского. К. К. Зейдлица. СПб., 1883. Рецензия [Life and poetry of V. A. Zhukovsky. K. K. Zeidlitz. St. Petersburg, 1883. Review.] (in Russian). Исторический вестник. 1883. pp. 699–702.
- Воспоминание о Д. И. Языкове [Memories about D. I. Yazykov] (in Russian). Vol. 16. Исторический вестник. 1884. pp. 96–106.
- "На Москве". Исторический роман графа Е. А. Салиаса. В четырёх частях. С.-Петербург. 1885 г. Рецензия [“On Moscow”. Historical novel by Count E. A. Salias. In four parts. S.-Petersburg. 1885. Review.] (in Russian). Исторический вестник. 1885. pp. 437–438.
- Дочь шута. Роман в двух томах. Соч. П. Р. Фурмана. СПб., 1885; Действия отрядов генерала Скобелева в русско-турецкую войну 1877—1878 годов. Ловча и Плевна. Генерального штаба генерал-майора Куропаткина. 2 части. СПб., 1885. Рецензии [The Jester's Daughter. A novel in two volumes. Op. by P. R. Furman. St. Petersburg, 1885; Actions of General Skobelev's detachments in the Russian-Turkish war of 1877-1878. Lovcha and Pleven. Major-General Kuropatkin's General Staff. 2 parts. St. Petersburg, 1885. Reviews] (in Russian). Исторический вестник. 1885. pp. 227–231.
- "Деды". Историческая повесть Всеволода Крестовского. СПб., 1885. Рецензия [“Grandfathers”. A historical tale by Vsevolod Krestovsky. St. Petersburg, 1885. Review.] (in Russian). Исторический вестник. 1883. pp. 693–694.
- Иринарх Иванович Введенский [Irinarch Ivanovich Vvedensky] (in Russian). Исторический вестник. 1888. pp. 579–580.
- Знакомство с А. И. Герценом. Отрывки из воспоминаний [Meeting with A. I. Herzen. Excerpts from memoirs] (in Russian). Русский вестник. 1888. pp. 47–61.

== Bibliography of articles and letter ==
- «Знакомство с А. И. Герценом». — «Герцен в воспоминаниях современников» ["Meeting with A. I. Herzen" - "Herzen in the memories of contemporaries”] (in Russian). М.: Гос. издательство художественной литературы [Гослитиздат]. 1956. pp. 222–237.
- «Иринарх Иванович Введенский». — «Н. Г. Чернышевский в воспоминаниях современников»: в 2 т. [“Irinarkh Ivanovich Vvedensky” - “N. G. Chernyshevsky in Memoirs of Contemporaries”: in 2 volumes.] (in Russian). Vol. I. Саратов. 1958. pp. 106–108.
- "Переписка с В. Р. Зотовым и Г. П. Данилевским. — «Достоевский в неизданной переписке современников» (1837—1881)". Ф. М. Достоевский: Новые материалы и исследования [F. M. Dostoevsky: New Materials and Researches]. Лит. наследство (in Russian). Vol. 86. М.: Наука. 1973. pp. 349–567.
- «Фёдор Михайлович Достоевский». — «Достоевский Ф. М. в воспоминаниях современников»: в 2 т. [“Fyodor Mikhailovich Dostoevsky.” - “Dostoevsky F. M. in the memoirs of contemporaries”: in 2 volumes]. Литературные мемуары (in Russian). Vol. 1. М.: Худож. лит. 1990. pp. 259–290.
- Милюков, Александр Петрович [Milyukov, Alexander Petrovich] (in Russian). СПб., 1890—1907: Энциклопедический словарь Брокгауза и Ефрона: в 86 т.
- Милюков, Александр Петрович [Milyukov, Alexander Petrovich] (in Russian). Vol. 5. Настольный энциклопедический словарь.
- Dostoevsky, F. M. (1972). Полное собрание сочинений в 30 томах [The Complete Works in 30 Volumes] (in Russian). Л.: Наука, 1972—1990.
- История русской литературы XIX века: Библиогр. указ [History of Russian Literature of the XIX Century: Bibliogr. op. cit.] (in Russian). М., Л.: Изд-во АН СССР. 1962.
- Leskov, N. S. (1956). Собрание сочинений: в 11 т. [The Complete Works: in 11 volumes] (in Russian). М.: Гослитиздат, 1956—1958.
- Trofimov, I. T. (1966). "А. П. Милюков — автор статей о Щедрине" [“А. P. Milyukov - the author of articles about Shchedrin”] (in Russian). Русская литература. p. 201.
