= Svetoch =

- Frequency: Monthly
- First issue: 1860
- Final issue: 1862
- Based in: Saint Petersburg, Russian Empire
- Language: Russian

Svetoch (Russian: Светоч, Guiding Light) was a Russian monthly science and literature magazine published in Saint Petersburg in 1860-1862 by the publisher Dmitry Kalinovsky. Alexander Milyukov was its editor-in-chief.

A liberal publication, Svetoch advocated the ideas of moderate social reforms, supported the 1861 Emancipation Act and positioned itself as an intermediary between the feuding slavophiles and westerners in Russia. The translated works of foreign writers constituted the considerable part of its literary section. Among the Russian authors who contributed to Svetoch regularly, were Pyotr Weinberg, Apollon Grigoryev, Mikhail Dostoyevsky, Lev Mei, Dmitry Minayev, Alexey Pleshcheyev, Nikolai Strakhov, Nikolai Shcherbina. The Caricature Leaflet (Карикатурный листок) came out as a monthly supplement to Svetoch.
