= Government Gazette (Russia) =

Government Bulletin of the Russian Empire

Правительственный Вѣстникъ
- Type: Daily newspaper
- Founded: 1868; 1918; 1989
- Ceased publication: 1918; 1920; 1992
- Political alignment: Official government publication
- Language: Russian
- Headquarters: St. Petersburg (1868–1918); Omsk (1918–1919); Irkutsk (1919–1920); Moscow (1989–1992)

The Government Gazette (Russian: Правительственный Вѣстникъ) was a daily St. Petersburg newspaper (1869–1917) under the General Directorate for Press Affairs (the highest censorship body under the Ministry of the Interior of the Russian Empire).

== History ==
The newspaper was established on the basis of the Highest Commandment on November 8, 1868, which was deemed necessary to concentrate in one common official newspaper for all ministries and main departments for printing various government orders, announcements and clarifications.

The idea of creation belonged to the Minister of the Interior Alexander Timashev.

It was published in St. Petersburg from January 13, 1869, to March 11, 1917, except Mondays and other post-holiday days. The Government Gazette replaced the newspaper Severnaya Pochta. The newspaper published orders and reports from the government, reports on meetings of the Council of Ministers and the State Council, domestic and foreign news, articles and book reviews, stock indexes, weather reports and other materials. Since 1861, the weekly newspaper Selskiy Vestnik was published under the Government Gazette.

In March 1917, the newspaper resumed its publication under the title "Provisional Government Gazette" (from March 5 to November 6, 1917) – as the official body of the Provisional Government. In the "Notifications" section, the newspaper published (in some issues) "lists of secret officers" of the previous regime with a brief description of their activities and their remuneration.

On October 28, 1917, the same editorial board (in the same building of the former Ministry of the Interior on Fontanka, 57) began to publish "The Newspaper of the Provisional Worker and Peasant Government" – instead of the "Provisional Government Gazette", which retained the general format and design of the "Government Gazette" and called itself "the official body of the Council of People's Commissars". Along with the former newspaper headings, a heading "Secret Documents" appeared, where some secret documents of the tsarist government of pre-revolutionary years were printed. From the beginning of January 1918, the newspaper switched to reformed spelling – unlike other Soviet newspapers. From February 2, 1918 – "The Newspaper of the Worker and Peasant Government". The newspaper was published until March 10, 1918, when the issue was discontinued.

On November 22, 1918, the issue of the Government Gazette was resumed by the Omsk Government, published in Omsk, then in Irkutsk until January 4, 1920.

From January 9, 1989, to February 23, 1992, the Government Gazette is the official body of the Council of Ministers, then the Cabinet of Ministers, then the Silayev's Government and the Interrepublic Economic Committee of the USSR.

== Chief editors ==
The post of the chief editor of the newspaper at various times occupied:

- Vasily Grigoriev (from January 1, 1869, to November 13, 1870)
- Peter Kapnist (from November 17, 1870)
- Sergey Sushkov (from April 2, 1874)
- Grigory Danilevsky (from August 22, 1882, to 1890)
- Ilya Tatarinov (acting from December 8, 1890)
- Sergey Tatishchev
- Vladimir Istomin (from January 27, 1891)
- Konstantin Sluchevsky (from April 6, 1891)
- Platon Kulakovsky (from 1902 to 1905)
- Alexander Bashmakov (from 1906 to 1913)
- Mitrofan Wojciechowicz (from 1910 to 1911, 1914)
- Prince Sergei Urusov (from 1913 to 1916)
- Ivan Kubasov (from 1914)

== Sources ==
- Government Gazette in the electronic library of the State Historic Public Library of Russia
- Government Gazette
- Russian periodicals (1702–1894): Handbook.
