= Pervomartovtsy =

Plotters to kill Alexander II of Russia

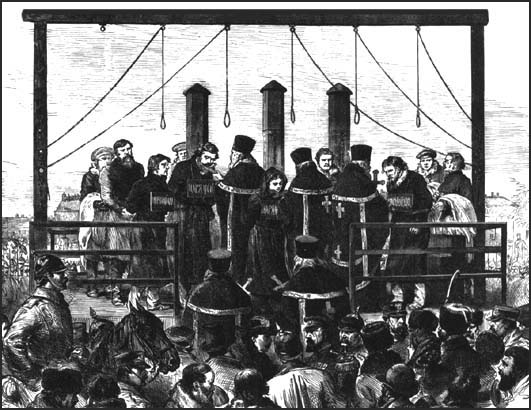
Five conspirators to be hanged

Pervomartovtsy (Russian: Первома́ртовцы; a compound term literally meaning those of March 1) were the Russian revolutionaries, members of Narodnaya Volya, planners and executors of the assassination of Alexander II of Russia (March 1, 1881) and the attempted assassination of Alexander III of Russia (March 1, 1887, also known as "The Second First of March").

== March 1, 1881 ==
The assassination in 1881 was planned by Narodnaya Volya's Executive Committee. Andrei Zhelyabov was the main organizer. After his arrest on February 27, he was replaced by Sophia Perovskaya.

Alexander II was killed on March 1, 1881 by a bomb, thrown by Ignacy Hryniewiecki. Hryniewiecki wounded himself fatally in the assassination; Nikolai Sablin committed suicide. Accomplices - Zhelyabov, Perovskaya, Nikolai Kibalchich, Hesya Helfman, Timofei Mikhailov, Nikolai Rysakov - were tried by the Special Tribunal of the Ruling Senate on March 26-29 and sentenced to death by hanging. On April 3, 1881 five Pervomartovtsy were hanged (except for Helfman, whose execution had been postponed due to her pregnancy. Her execution was later replaced with katorga (forced penal labor) for an indefinite period of time; she nevertheless died of a post-natal complication in prison).

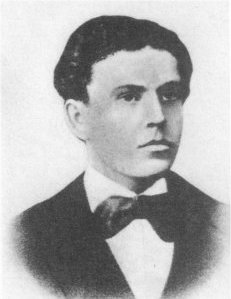
Ignacy Hryniewiecki

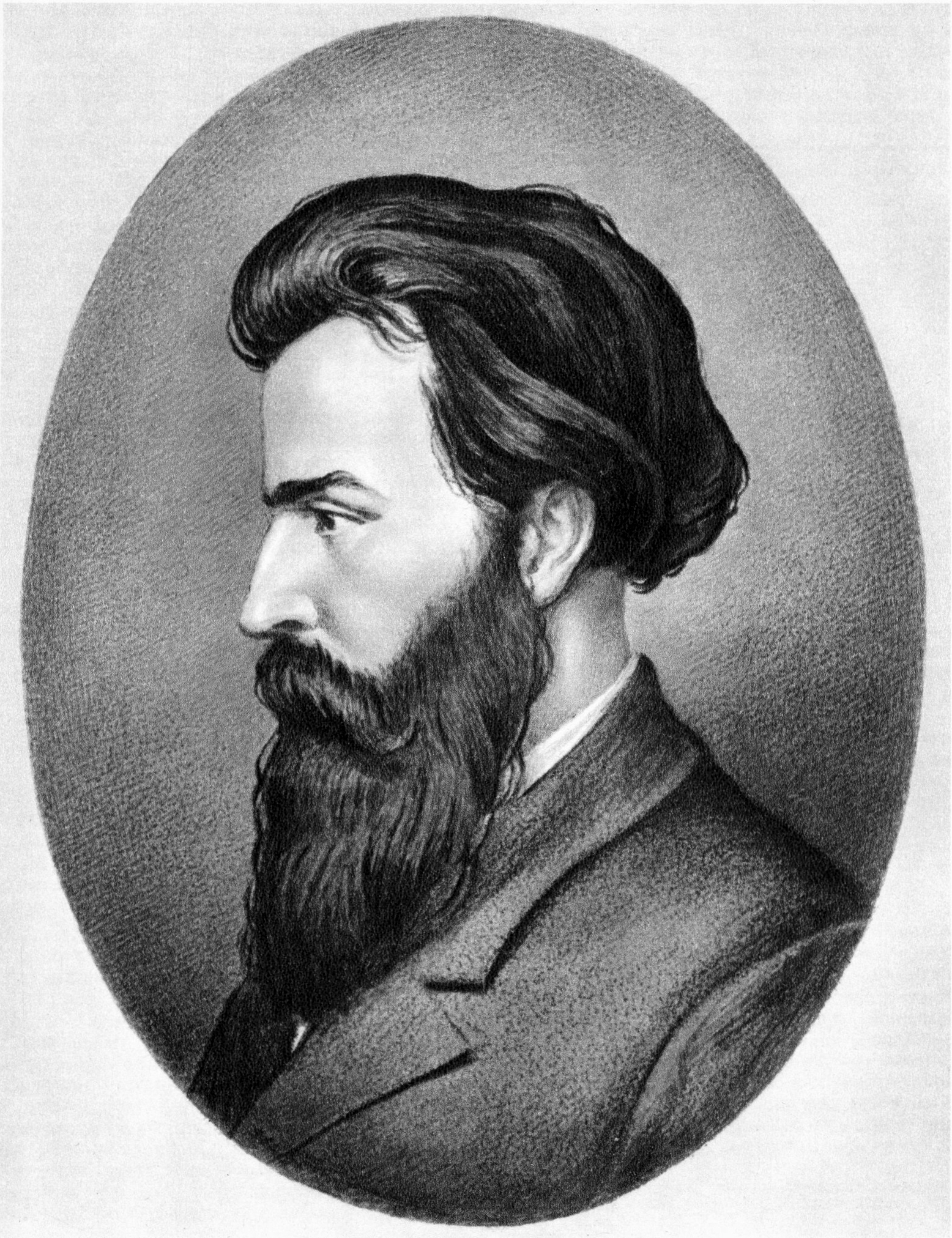
Andrei Zhelyabov

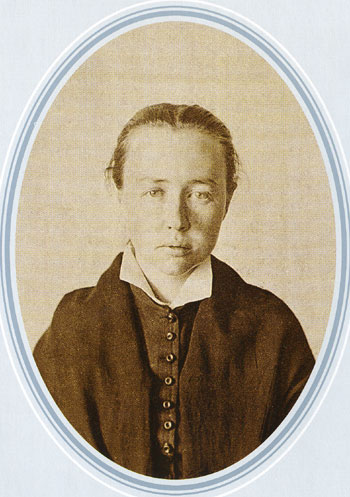
Sophia Perovskaya

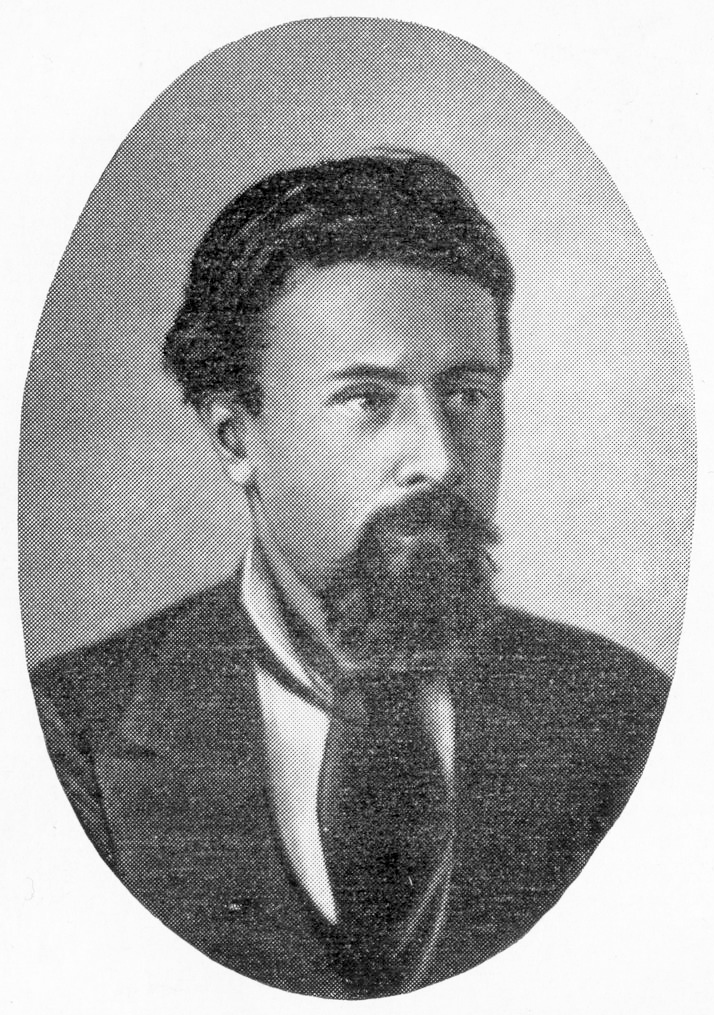
Nikolai Kibalchich

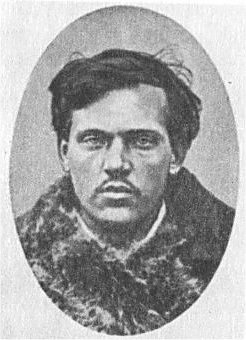
Timofey Mikhaylov

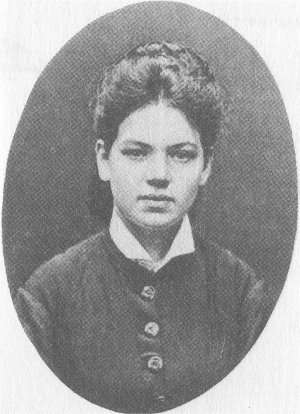
Hesya Helfman

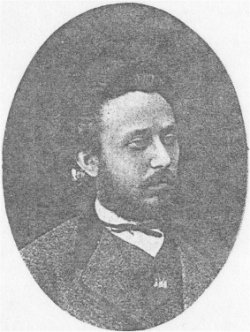
Nikolai Sablin

== March 1, 1887 ==
The second "First of March" was planned by members of the "terrorist faction" of Narodnaya Volya, including Aleksandr Ulyanov (brother of Vladimir Lenin). On March 1, 1887, they came to St. Petersburg's Nevsky Prospekt with bombs and waited for the carriage of Tsar Alexander III to pass by. However, they were arrested on the spot before his arrival. All of the 15 accomplices - Aleksandr Ulyanov, Petr Shevyrev (main organizers), Pakhomiy Andreyushkin, Vasili Generalov, Vasili Osipanov (bombthrowers) and ten other people - were tried by the Special Senate Committee on April 15–19 and sentenced. The first five were hanged on May 8, 1887; the rest were sentenced to prison, banishment, or katorga.
