= Nikolai Sablin =

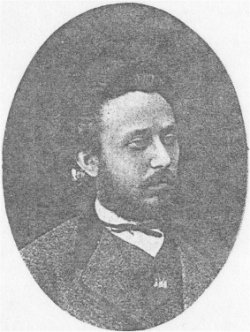
Nikolai Sablin, 1870s

Nikolai Alekseyevich Sablin (Russian: Никола́й Алексе́евич Са́блин), the son of a petty landowner, was born in 1849 or 1850 (sources vary). While at Moscow University he became involved in revolutionary politics as a member of the Narodnaya Volya or People's Will.

Sablin went to Zurich in 1874 but returned to Russia the following year. He was arrested in March, 1875, but was not tried until January, 1878. He was found guilty but was soon released because of the long time he had been awaiting trial.

A member of People's Will, Sabin joined the plot to kill Alexander II. Others involved included Sophia Perovskaya, Andrei Zhelyabov, Hesya Helfman, Ignaty Grinevitsky, Nikolai Kibalchich, Nikolai Rysakov, and Timofei Mikhailov.

On 15 March 1881, two days after Alexander II was assassinated, police raided the conspiratorial flat, where Sablin and Hesya Helfman were living as an unsuspicious apparent married couple. Sablin shot himself in the head with a revolver before he could be arrested.

== Sources ==
- Nikolai Sablin
