= Ivan Yemelyanov =

Russian regicide (1860–1915)

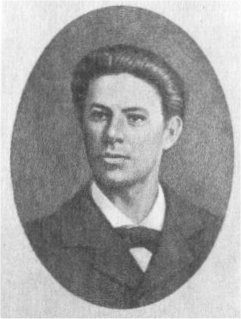
- Born: 1860/1861; Bessarabia, Russian Empire
- Died: 27 November 1915 (age c. 55); Khabarovsk, Russian Empire

Ivan Panteleymonovich Yemelyanov (Russian: Иван Пантелеймонович Емельянов; c. 1860 — 27 November 1915) was a member of the Russian revolutionary organization Narodnaya Volya who took part in the assassination of Tsar Alexander II of Russia.

== Early life ==
Ivan Yemelyanov was born into an impoverished family of an acolyte in Bessarabia about the year 1860. In 1870, at the age of nine, Yemelyanov was taken to be raised by his uncle who served at the Russian embassy in Constantinople. After a few years he returned to Russia, and after graduating from a trade school in 1879, he became qualified as a cabinetmaker. He went on to study abroad on a grant from Baron Günzburg. This gave him the opportunity to visit various countries such as Germany, Austria, Switzerland, and France. In November 1880 he joined the ranks of the Narodnaya Volya.

== Assassination of Alexander II ==
In January 1881, Anna Pavlovna Pribyleva-Korba suggested Yemelyanov as a potential bomb-thrower to Andrei Zhelyabov. Yemelyanov subsequently became one of the four designated bomb-throwers in the assassination of Tsar Alexander II.

On 13 March [O.S. 1 March], when Sophia Perovskaya signaled the Emperor's approach to the road alongside the Catherine Canal, the bomb-thrower Timofey Mikhailov decided to leave. Yemelyanov, Ignacy Hryniewiecki, and Nikolai Rysakov were the only assassins present. On the signal being given by Perovskaya, Rysakov threw his bomb, which partly shattered the carriage, wounded bystanders and killed on the spot the Cossack footman who rode behind. About 5 minutes after the Tsar alighted, Hryniewiecki threw his bomb that fell at the Tsar's feet. According to Yemelyanov's testimony, he was stationed about 20 paces from the Emperor when the two bombs went off.

Yemelyanov had to throw his bomb only if Hryniewiecki's bomb had not been effective. After the second explosion, Yemelyanov rushed to the scene to see if Hryniewiecki could be spirited away but found him terribly injured. Then, on impulse, he instead approached the Tsar, and claimed to have been the first at his side to give him aid. He helped prop the Tsar up in the sleigh. He did this with the bomb wrapped up in a newspaper under his left arm. He then returned to the group's headquarters on Telezhnaya Street and turned in the bomb which he had received from Perovskaya that morning.

== Trial and later life ==
Rysakov's testimony had implicated Yemelyanov. He failed to leave St. Petersburg and was eventually arrested in April at his apartment. On February 15 O.S., 1882, Yemelyanov was sentenced to death, and after about a month, Alexander III approved the verdict of commuting the death penalty to indefinite penal servitude. Yemelyanov was exiled to penal labor, or katorga. He served his sentence of hard labor in the Trubetskoy bastion for about 2 years and 3 months, after which he was sent to the Siberian exile. In 1891, the sentence was commuted to 20 years and he was granted a pardon in 1895.

He settled in Khabarovsk where he started several businesses. In 1898, he married the daughter of a local wealthy tradesman. Yemelyanov died on 27 November 1915 after a serious illness (according to doctors he had suffered blood poisoning with erysipelas). He was buried at a church.

== Bibliography ==
- Yarmolinsky, Avrahm (2016). Road to Revolution: A Century of Russian Radicalism. Princeton University Press. ISBN 978-0691638546.
- Kel'ner, Viktor Efimovich (2015). 1 marta 1881 goda: Kazn imperatora Aleksandra II (1 марта 1881 года: Казнь императора Александра II). Lenizdat. ISBN 978-5-289-01024-7.
- Zhukov, Anatoly. "Полузабытая судьба". Словесница Искусств.
