= Ignacy Hryniewiecki =

Belarusian assassin of Tsar Alexander II (c. 1856-1881)

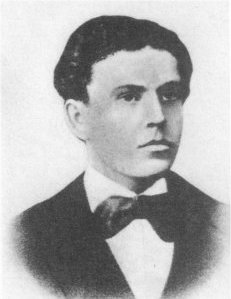
- Hryniewiecki in an undated photograph
- Born: 1856; Bobruysky Uyezd, Minsk Governorate, Russian Empire
- Died: March 13, 1881 (aged 24—25); Court Stables Infirmary, St. Petersburg, Russian Empire
- Cause of death: Wounds sustained from a suicide attack
- Other names: Kotik; Mikhail Ivanovich; Elnikov
- Education: Saint Petersburg State Institute of Technology
- Known for: Assassinating Alexander II of Russia
- Motive: Overthrow the tsarist autocracy
- Accomplice: Members of Narodnaya Volya

Details
- Victims: Alexander II of Russia fatally wounded and several others injured
- Date: 13 March 1881
- Locations: Near the Catherine Canal, Saint Petersburg
- Weapons: Nitroglycerin and piroxylin bomb

Ignacy Hryniewiecki or Ignaty Ioakhimovich Grinevitsky (Note: According to the GBooks ngraph, both names have been used in literature. His full name, as it appears in the original biographical extracts, is "Ignaty Ioakimovich Grinevitsky" (Russian: Игнатий Иоакимович Гриневицкий).) (Russian: Игнатий Гриневицкий, Polish: Ignacy Hryniewiecki, Belarusian: Ігнат Грынявіцкі; c. 1856 — March 13, 1881) was a Polish-Belarusian member of the Russian revolutionary society Narodnaya Volya. He gained notoriety for participating in the bombing attack to which Tsar Alexander II of Russia succumbed. Hryniewiecki threw the bomb that fatally wounded the Tsar and himself. Having outlived his victim by a few hours, he died the same day.

Hryniewiecki and his accomplices believed that the assassination of Alexander II could provoke a political or social revolution to overthrow the tsarist autocracy. Many historians consider the assassination a Pyrrhic victory, since instead of ushering in a revolution, it strengthened the resolve of the state to crush the revolutionary movement, leading to the movement's decline in the 1880s and setting Russia on a revitalized path of Tsarist autocracy which resulted in only incremental reforms after the Revolution of 1905 and, eventually, the Russian Revolution in 1917.

Hryniewiecki's role in the assassination has sometimes been cited as the earliest occurrence of suicide terrorism.

== Life ==
=== Early life ===
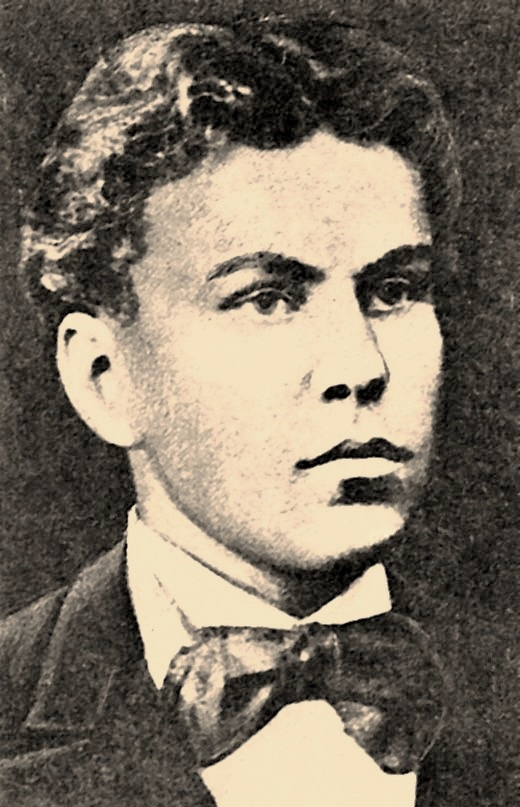
Hryniewiecki

Ignacy Hryniewiecki was born in 1855–6, (Note: According to literature, he is said to have been either 25 or 26 years old in March 1881. His biographer, I.I. Zhukovsky-Zhuk, places the date of his birth most securely in the fall of 1856, although he notes that certain relatives of Hryniewiecki have placed it as early as August 1855.) in Bobruysky Uyezd of Minsk Governorate (present-day Klichaw District, Mogilev Region), to a large family which hailed from Grodno Governorate. He was the son of a Catholic landowner who was of the Polish nobility. According to his former comrade Lev Tikhomirov, "He (scil. Hryniewiecki) called himself a Litvin, and not a Pole." Tikhomirov considered him a Russified Pole, and further added that he was equally fluent in Russian and Polish. At one point when Hryniewiecki was reproached for not participating in the Polish movements, he replied: "When you start partisan fighting, I will be with you. But for the moment, when you do nothing, I shall work for Russia's freedom".

In 1875, Hryniewiecki graduated from a gymnasium in Białystok with the highest academic rank, and in autumn he left for Saint Petersburg to enroll in mechanical engineering at the Saint Petersburg State Institute of Technology. In 1879 he became involved with Narodnaya Volya (People's Will), an underground Russian revolutionary movement to which he had contributed financial support, and within which he established a Belarusian faction. He was dismissed from the institute on June 1, 1880, for not attending lectures. In that year, working under the pseudonyms Kotik (Russian for "Kitten") and Mikhail Ivanovich, Hryniewiecki was engaged in anti-Government activities and disseminated revolutionary propaganda among students and workers. He was also an organizer of the underground literature Rabochaya Gazeta at a clandestine printing establishment. (Note: Nikolai Rysakov testified that Hryniewiecki was involved with the production of propaganda literature directed at workers, in particular the first few issues of Rabochaya Gazeta, which Rysakov then distributed to workers in various inns and taverns.) According to contemporary descriptions, Hryniewiecki was of medium height, lightly bearded, possessed curly hair, and was good-natured and taciturn.

=== Assassination of the Tsar ===
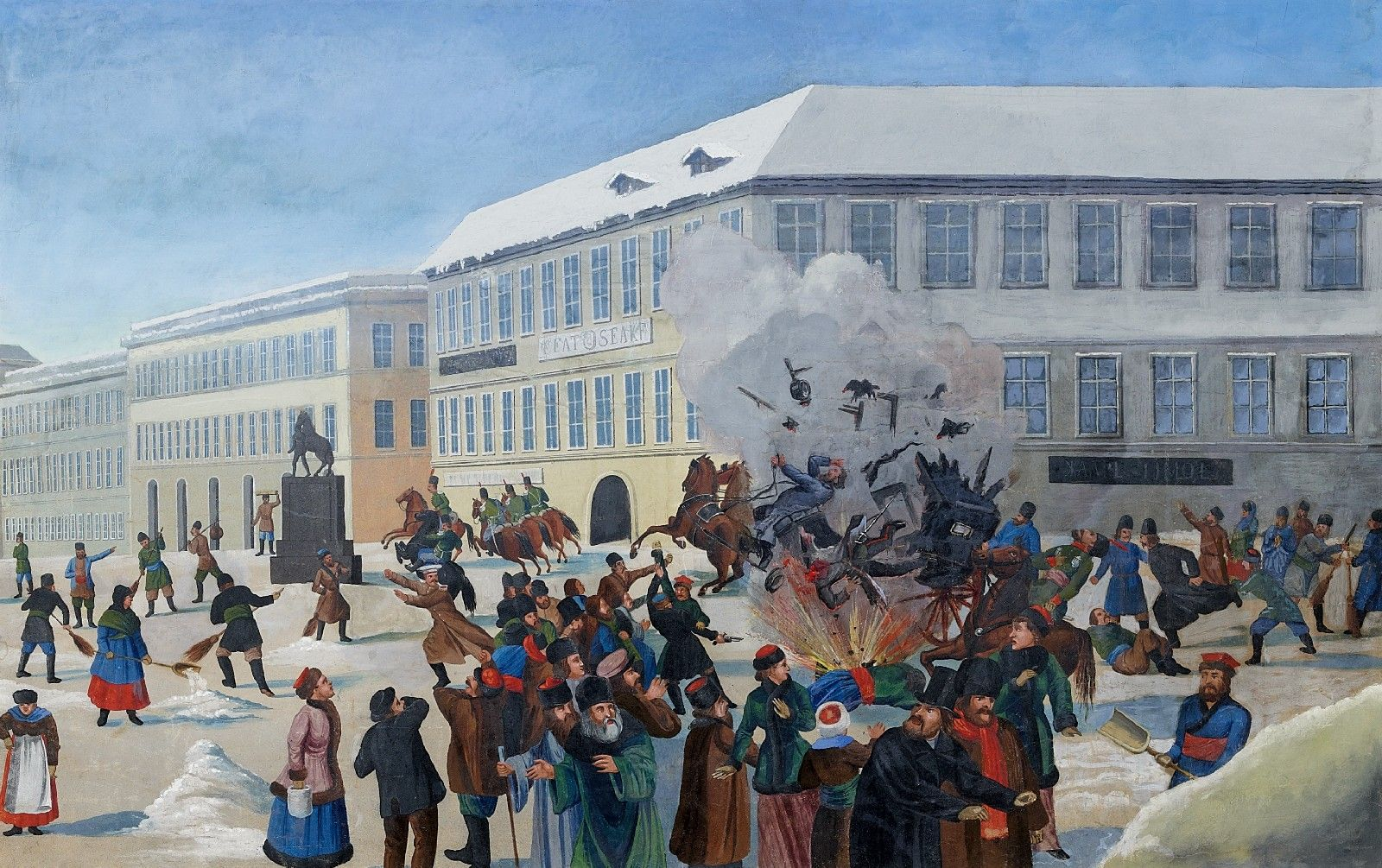
Depiction of the assassination of Alexander II by an unknown author

In the fall of 1880, Hryniewiecki and five others were tasked with monitoring the various departure routes of the Tsar following his regular Sunday review of the troops at Mikhailovskii Riding School. On February 26, 1881, their observations were discussed in a meeting held at Hryniewiecki's apartment at 59 Simbirskaya street, where he had been living under the surname Elnikov. They had observed that the Tsar frequently traveled through Malaya Sadovaya Street, so the executive committee decided to lay a mine there beneath the pavement. They however realized that he could also take a different route by turning into Italyanskaya Street and following the Catherine Canal, thus avoiding the underground mine. It was therefore necessary to have bomb-throwers that manned the canal.

Hryniewiecki volunteered and was designated a bomb-thrower (metal'shchik, in the parlance of revolutionary terrorism). The bombs, prepared by the chemist Nikolai Kibalchich, were specifically designed so that they could be hurled at moving objects. The bombs reportedly weighed 5–6 pounds and the explosive consisted of a mixture of nitroglycerine and pyroxylin. At a clandestine meeting, Hryniewiecki joined Kibalchich, Nikolai Rysakov and Timofei Mikhailov to test half-loaded bombs in an unfrequented suburban park beyond the Neva around Pargolovo.

The night before the assassination, Hryniewiecki wrote a letter to posterity, part of which reads:

Alexander II must die. He will die, and with him, we, his enemies, his executioners, shall die too [...] How many more sacrifices will our unhappy country ask of its sons before it is liberated? [...] It is my lot to die young, I shall not see our victory, I shall not live one day, one hour in the bright season of our triumph, but I believe that with my death I shall do all that it is my duty to do, and no one in the world can demand more of me [...]

On Sunday morning, 13 March [1 March, Old Style] 1881, Hryniewiecki and the three other bomb-throwers gathered at the group's flat on Telezhnaya Street. At 9–10 AM, Sophia Perovskaya and Kibalchich each brought two missiles; the men would have one apiece. Perovskaya would later relate that, before heading to the Catherine Canal, she, Rysakov and Hryniewiecki sat in a confectionery store located opposite of the Gostiny Dvor, impatiently waiting for the right time to intercept Alexander II's cavalcade. Only Hryniewiecki could calmly eat a portion served to him. From there they parted ways and converged on the canal. There, as he passed Perovskaya to take up his position on the quay, Hryniewiecki smiled at her and gave her a barely perceptible wink. He showed no signs of fear or anxiety and went to his death with an unflinching spirit. (Note: This is reported by the fellow conspirator Arkady Tyrkov, who in his testimony, provides the essence of his verbal exchange with Perovskaya immediately after the assassination.)

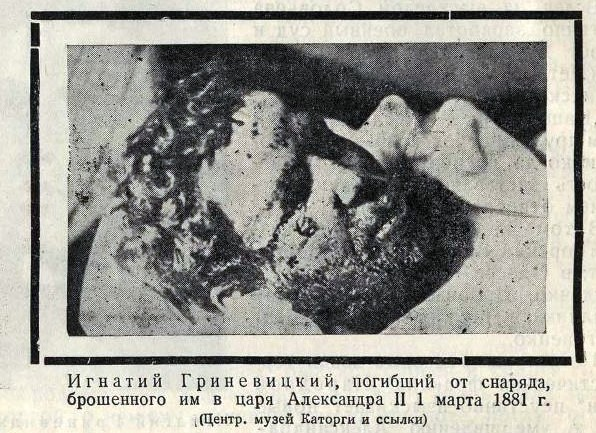
Hryniewiecki's face after the assassination c. 1881

At about 2:15 PM, the conspirators intercepted the imperial carriage as it approached a street corner near the Catherine Canal. Perovskaya waved her handkerchief as a predetermined signal to the bomb-throwers to proceed with the attack. Rysakov then hurled his bomb at the carriage, wounding several bystanders and members of the Tsar's equipage. Disregarding pleas for his own safety, Alexander insisted upon leaving his carriage to see his captured assailant. After inspecting Rysakov, instead of returning to the palace posthaste, the Tsar decided to survey the spot where the explosion had occurred. He said "Thank God, I escaped injury," in answer to the anxious inquiries of his entourage. As his curiosity was satisfied, he decided to drive away and proceeded to walk back towards the carriage. At this point, the Tsar had come to less than 1.5 meters from Hryniewiecki, (Note: According to two eyewitnesses, the attack took place when the Tsar was no more than two arshins from his would-be assassin, or, two or three paces of him.) who was leaning against the railing by the canal fence and carrying a bomb wrapped in a handkerchief. Hearing the Tsar's expression of gratitude, according to some sources Hryniewiecki shouted: "It is too soon to thank God yet". (Note: This is uncertain since a similar line is instead attributed to Rysakov in the original post-arrest testimonies.) He turned to face the Tsar and raised both arms and threw a bomb at his feet. Alexander suffered severe wounds and died at 3:30 PM on that day. Reportedly, Hryniewiecki's bomb claimed many more casualties than the first, with one bystander being fatally wounded.

Following the explosion, the third bomber Ivan Emelyanov rushed to the scene to see if Hryniewiecki could still be spirited away in the chaos, but found him lying gravely wounded and unconscious from the blast. Hryniewiecki was taken to the nearby infirmary attached to the Winter Palace. (Note: He had been carried to the hospital which was known in Russian as: "Придворно-конюшенном госпитале" (literally Court stables hospital).) At 9 PM he regained consciousness before he drew his last breath. According to the medical examiner's report he only once abruptly said "I don't know" to the police at his bedside who had been questioning him about his name and rank. Refusing to disclose any information, he died from his wounds at 10:30 PM.

=== Aftermath ===
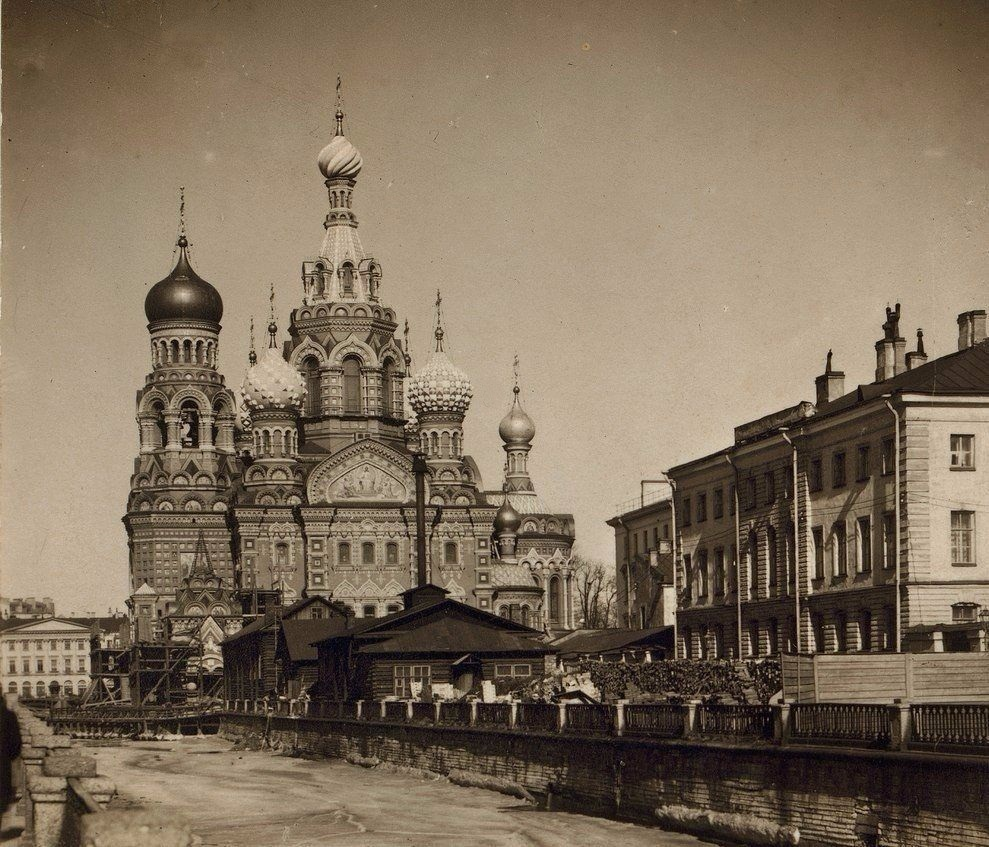
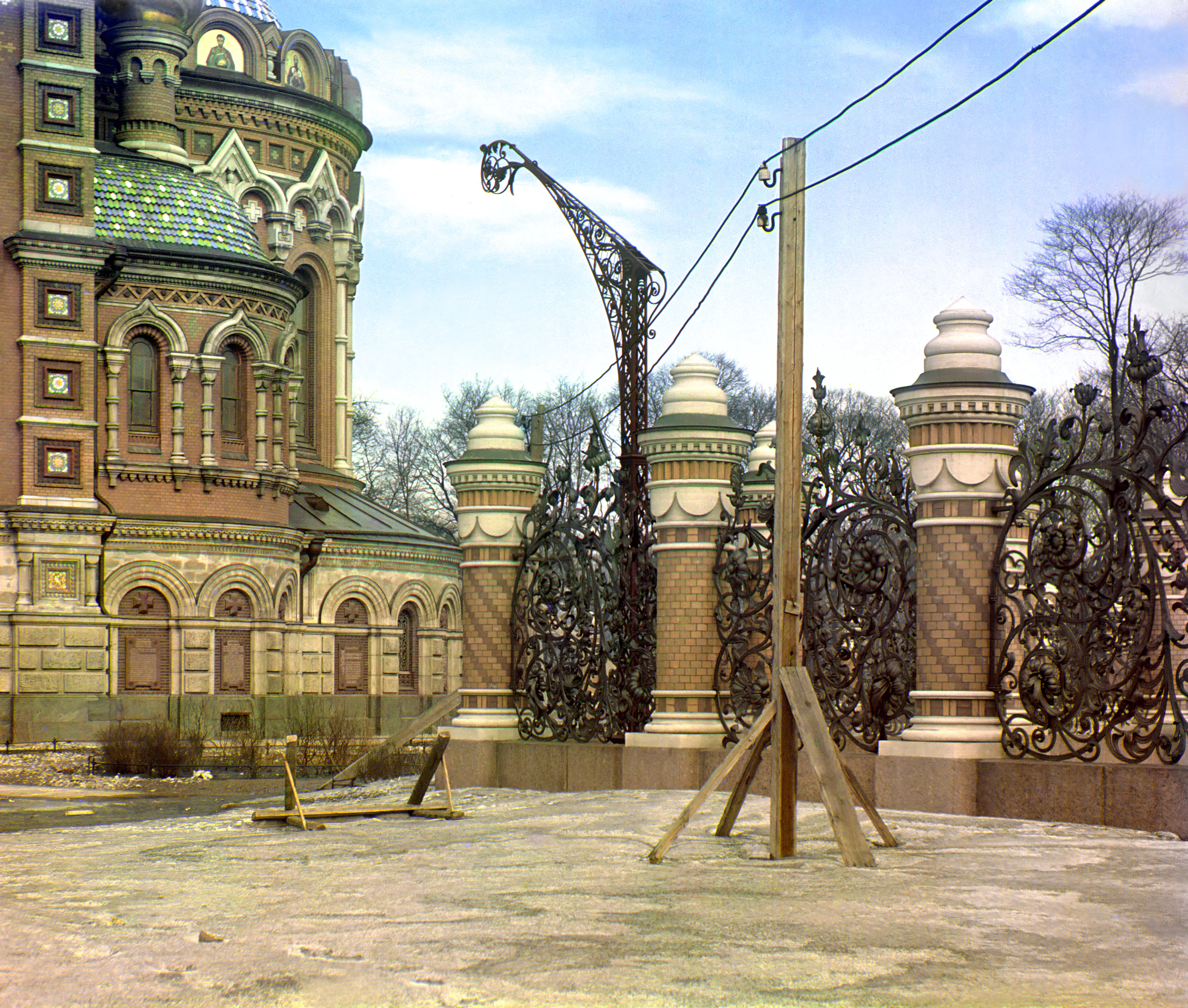
Photographs of the Cathedral of Resurrection near its completion, taken by Sergey Prokudin-Gorsky approximately 24 years after the assassination.

Hryniewiecki's identity was established only posthumously in April 1881. During the trial of the tsaricides, he was simply referred to as "the person who died on March 1, and lived under the false name of Elnikov." During his post-arrest confession, Andrei Zhelyabov refused to identify his body. Rysakov, the first bomb-thrower, had only known Hryniewiecki by his party pseudonyms, and was thus unable to reveal his true name. His surname was first revealed by the arrested member of People's Will, Kolodkevich. This was further corroborated and supplemented by members of St. Petersburg Technological Institute, as well as by his relations in his hometown.

Hryniewiecki and his fellow conspirators had hoped that the assassination would precipitate a political or social revolution. However, it instead impelled Alexander III to step up state repression and abrogate many of his predecessor's reforms. Numerous arrests depleted the executive committee, which together with the intensified police surveillance dealt serious blows to the movement. Many historians have therefore regarded the assassination as a Pyrrhic victory and a prelude to the decline of the revolutionary movement in the 1880s. (Note: See, for example, the text by Avrahm Yarmolinsky, Ch. 15: "A Pyrrhic Victory". Also, see the article by Deborah Pearl.)

The role of a bomb-thrower was known to carry with it the likelihood of death, and the designated bomb-throwers such as Hryniewiecki took that role knowingly, and accepted a suicide mission. Hryniewiecki is therefore sometimes considered to be the first suicide bomber. (Note: See, for instance: Bennett (2007); Baddeley (2009); Ortbals (2018); Overton (2019).)

A chapel and later the Resurrection Cathedral (in popular parlance, "the Savior on the Blood") was erected on the spot of Alexander's assassination on Catherine Canal.

== Legacy ==
In May 1975, the bridge near the scene of the incident was named after Hryniewiecki as the Grinevitsky Bridge, until it was renamed Novo-Konyushenny Bridge in 1998.

In the Polish city of Władysławowo, a street is named after Ignacy Hryniewiecki. Belarusian writer Uladzimir Karatkievich wrote a poem dedicated to him.
