= Kvaevenutane Peaks =

- Location within Antarctica

Geography
- Location: Queen Maud Land
- Range coordinates: 71°57′S 14°18′E

The Kvaevenutane Peaks are a small cluster of peaks which include Mount Kibal'chich and Mount Brounov, located 2 nautical miles (4 km) southwest of Kvaevefjellet Mountain in the Payer Mountains of Queen Maud Land, Antarctica. They were discovered and plotted from air photos by the Third German Antarctic Expedition, 1938–39. They were replotted from air photos and surveys by the Sixth Norwegian Antarctic Expedition, 1956–60, and named in association with Kvaevefjellet Mountain.
