= Mount Brounov =

Mountain in Antarctica

Mount Brounov (71°58′S 14°20′E) is a mountain, 2,370 metres (7,780 ft) high, standing 1.5 nautical miles (3 km) south of Mount Kibal'chich in the Payer Mountains of Queen Maud Land. It was first plotted from air photos by the Third German Antarctic Expedition, 1938–39. It was mapped from air photos and from surveys by the Sixth Norwegian Antarctic Expedition, 1956–60?; remapped by the Soviet Antarctic Expedition, 1960–61, and named after P.I. Brounov, a Soviet geographer.
