= Manezhnaya Square, Saint Petersburg =

Coordinates: 59°56′9″N 30°20′25″E

Manezhnaya Square (Russian: Манежная площадь, romanized Manezhnaya ploschad) is a square in the Tsentralny District of Saint Petersburg.

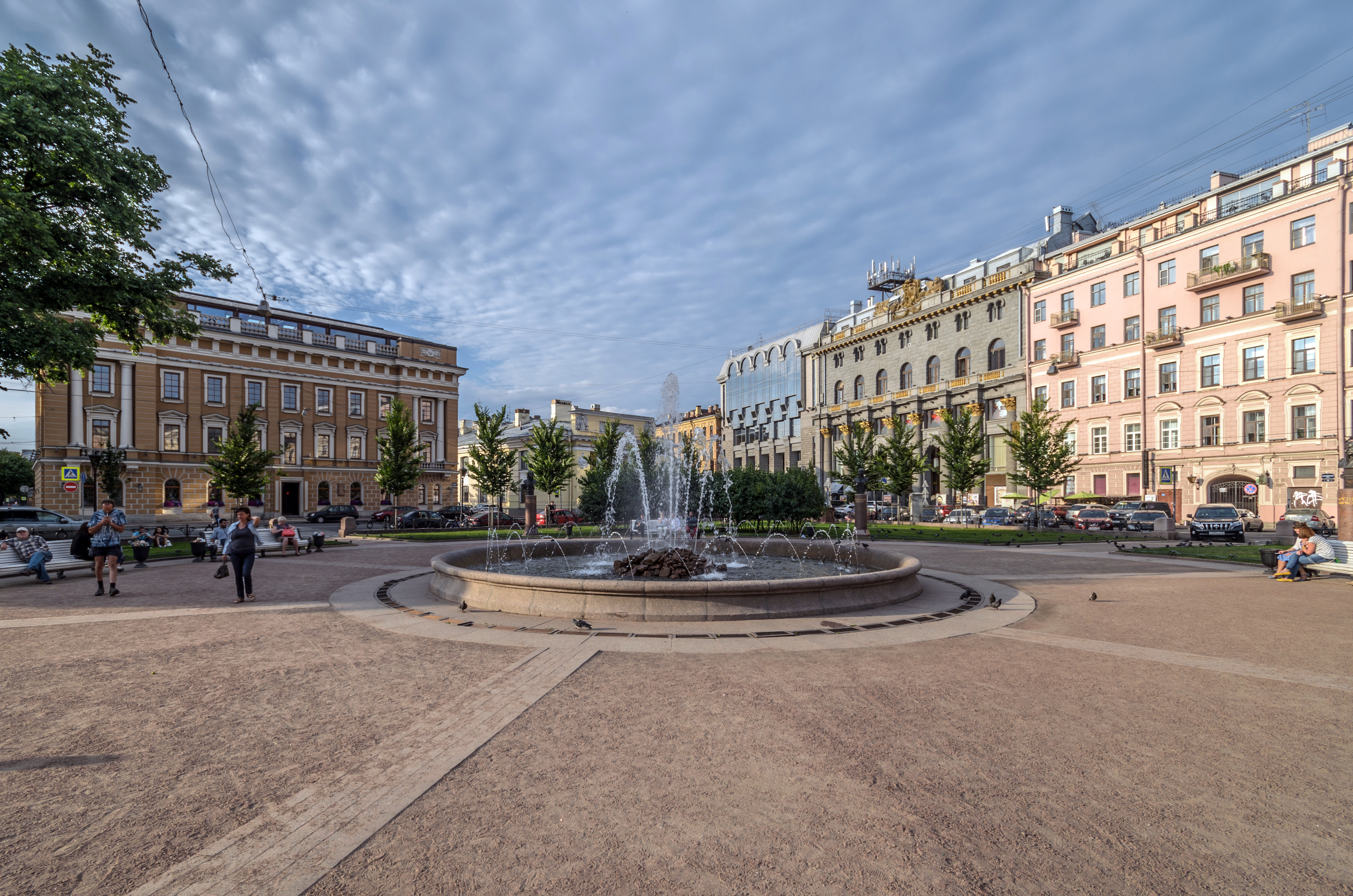
Fountain at Manezhnaya Square

In some guidebooks this square may be also named a Riding-School Square: "riding school" is one of the variants in which French: manège and Russian: манеж, romanized: manezh may be translated.

The shape of Manezhnaya Square is close to the right-angled triangle. Its longest cathetus, the southern side of Manezhnaya Square is formed with Italyanskaya Street, which runs parallel to Nevsky Prospect, at about hundred meters north of it. The shortest cathetus is Karavannaya Street, which forms the eastern side of the square running from Nevky prospect to the north. Another street connecting the square to Nevsky is Malaya Sadovaya which intersects Italyanskaya Street at the western corner of the square. Here converges the third, longest side — the "hypotenuse" of this triangle square. Driveways flanking one of the buildings on this side of the square merge behind it into a boulevard, Klenovaya alley, which runs from Manezhnaya Square to Mikhailovsky Castle.

== Walkmap ==
1 — Stables of Mikhailovsky Castle (east wing)	8 — Apartment house
2 — House of ex Military Ministry	9 — Apartment house
3 — Mikhailovsky Manege (Zimniy Stadion)	10 — Apartment house
4 — Apartment house	11 — Apartment house
5 — Old Manege Garden	12 — Apartment house
6 — Stables of Mikhailovsky Castle (west wing)	13 — Apartment house
7 — The House of Radio	14 — The House of Cinematography
	15 — New Manege Garden

== Literature ==
- Shvidkovsky, D. S. (2007). Russian architecture and the West. Yale University Press. ISBN 978-0-300-10912-2.
- Insight City Guide St. Petersburg. APA Publications. 2005. ISBN 9789812581501.
- Ye. Doroshinskaya, V. Kruchina (1969). Leningrad: Guidebook. Novosti Press Agency. p. 109.
- Vsevolod Sergeevich Shvartz (1972). Leningrad: art and architecture. Leningrad: Progress Publishers. p. 117.
