= Hesya Helfman =

Belarusian revolutionary (1855–1882)

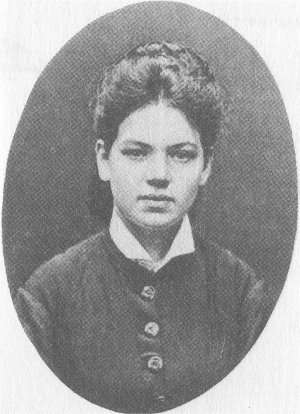
- Born: 1855; Mozyr, Minsk Governorate, Russian Empire
- Died: 1 February 1882 (aged 26–27); Saint Petersburg, Russian Empire
- Cause of death: Peritonitis
- Occupations: Manual worker (seamstress); revolutionary
- Political party: Narodnaya Volya
- Spouse: Nikolay Kolodkevich
- Children: 1

Hesya Mirovna (Meerovna) Helfman (Note: Her surname is variously transcribed in Western countries as Gelfman, Gel'fman, Guelfman, while her first name is also spelt Gesya, Gesia, Gesja, Guesia, Hesse, Hessy, or even Jessy. As regards her second name (patronymic), according to the direct testimony of Vladimir Jochelson, a fighting comrade of Helfman's and her partner in running a Narodnaya Volya conspiratorial flat in 1880 – he was later to become a renowned ethnographer – her correct patronymic was 'Meerovna': it derived from her father's Yiddish name Meir/Meer, and was transliterated into Cyrillic as 'Мировна' (Mirovna). In fact, in order to avoid the tsarist bureaucracy's ethnic religious prejudice, Helfman herself often adopted a revised patronymic 'Мироновна' (Mironovna), which had the merit of sounding more authentically Russian. It was with the latter patronymic that she was recorded in the proceedings of the 1881 trial. According to Lee B. Croft, on the contrary, the correct patronymic is an otherwise unheard-of 'Mirokhovna', and it remains obscure whence the variant 'Mironovna' did spring up in court.) (Yiddish: העסיע העלפֿמאַן; Russian: Геся Мировна (Мееровна) Гельфман, romanized: Gesya Mirovna Gelfman; 1855 (Note: In her deposition during the 1881 trial, Helfman declared she was 26; from which it follows that 1855 ought to be the year of her birth. According to some historians, however, she might have been born, instead, in 1852 or 1853.) — 13 February [O.S. 1 February] 1882) was a Belarusian-Jewish revolutionary member of Narodnaya Volya, who was implicated in the assassination of Alexander II of Russia. Escaping execution as she was pregnant at the time, she died in the aftermath of childbirth in prison.

== Biography ==
=== Early life ===
Helfman was born into a religious Jewish family, in Mozyr, Belarus, then part of the Russian Empire. She received no schooling, and had a husband picked for her by her father while she was a teenager. She ran away from home in 1868, before the wedding could take place. She lived with a local Christian friend, then moved to Kiev, where she worked as a seamstress and began training to be a midwife.

=== Revolutionary activities ===
In the early 1870s, Helfman was an active member of several revolutionary clubs in Kiev where she met, among others, Leo Deutsch and her future husband Nikolay Kolodkevich. Helfman was sentenced to two years' imprisonment at the Litovsky Castle during the 1877 Trial of the Fifty, and on 14 March 1879 was sent into exile to the province Novgorod.

She escaped a few months later and joined Narodnaya Volya in Saint Petersburg, probably following her husband who was a member of the organization's executive committee. In 1881 Helfman was part of the Narodnaya Volya group that assassinated Alexander II, albeit not in a front-line position; she was assigned to run a conspiratorial flat, where she lived with another member of the group, Nikolai Sablin, as an unsuspicious apparent married couple. When the police raided their apartment, two days after the deadly attack on the tsar, Sablin shot himself while she was captured.

=== Death ===
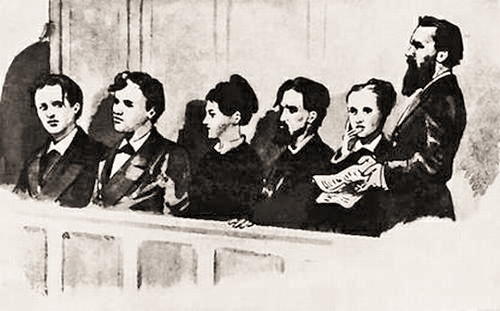
Hesya Helfman (third from left) on trial

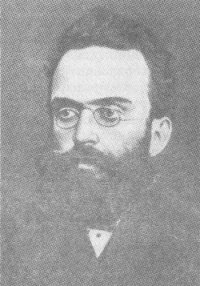
Nikolay Kolodkevich, Hesya Helfman's husband

During the Pervomartovtsy trial in March 1881, Helfman refused to admit her guilt, but was nonetheless sentenced to death by hanging for her alleged part in the assassination of the tsar. A few hours after being convicted, she made a statement that "in view of the ... sentence I have received, I consider it my moral duty to declare that I am in the fourth month of pregnancy". Her husband Nikolay Kolodkevich had also been arrested in January 1881. According to contemporary law, execution of pregnant women was banned as the unborn child was considered innocent. Therefore, Helfman's execution was officially postponed until forty days after childbirth, and in the meantime she would stay in the harsh Peter and Paul Fortress prison.

Three months later, thanks to the campaign against her execution by Socialists in Western Europe (Note: See The Times, 11 May 1881, p. 7. There were also demonstrations in Marseilles, which resulted in some of the participants being fined and/or imprisoned; see The Times, 1 June 1881, p. 7.) and in the foreign press, Helfman's sentence was commuted to an indefinite period of katorga (forced labor). She was transferred back to the remand prison where she had been held before. On 5 July (NS), whilst still in the Peter and Paul Fortress and by permission of the Minister of the Interior, Count Ignatiev, she was granted an interview (which lasted almost an hour and a half) with a journalist from the newspaper Golos who was accompanied by her defence counsel at her trial, a lawyer named Goerke. During the course of this interview, she complained about the lack of "proper medical and female attendance".

Helfman gave birth in detention in October 1881. Upon the request of the Department of Police, her childbirth was assisted by a gynaecologist who was also employed by the Imperial court, something unprecedented. She had a severe maternal complication, as her perineum was torn. It was rumoured that the gynaecologist had refused the prison doctor's suggestion to sew the wound together; in any case, it never healed. She remained delirious during some of the postnatal period. By 24 November, she had developed peritonitis, which became acute on 17 January 1882. She nevertheless nursed her daughter from her birth in October until 25 January, when the baby was taken away from her, placed in an orphanage and registered as a child of unknown parents. According to the subsequent medical report, the peritonitis became general and caused fever on the same day. Six days later, Helfman died. Her child died of an unknown disease shortly thereafter. Tsarist authorities had rejected the request of Kolodkevich's parents for the legal custody of the baby. Kolodkevich died in prison in 1884.

== Legacy ==
The importance of Helfman's role in the assassination was undetermined, and her Jewish origins were stressed during the pogroms that followed the assassination. Another conspirator, Ignacy Hryniewiecki, was also rumoured to be Jewish, though there seems to have been no basis for this.

Revolutionary Sergey Stepnyak-Kravchinsky dedicated a chapter of his Underground Russia (1883) to Helfman, the only one dedicated to a person he had not met personally. Writes Stepnyak:

There are unknown heroines, obscure toilers, who offer up everything upon the altar of their cause, without asking anything for themselves. They assume the most ungrateful parts; sacrifice themselves for the merest trifles; for lending their names to the correspondence of others; for sheltering a man, often unknown to them; for delivering a parcel without knowing what it contains. Poets do not dedicate verses to them; history will not inscribe their names upon its records; a grateful posterity will not remember them. Without their labour, however, the party could not exist; every struggle would become impossible.

Yet the wave of history carries away one of these toilers from the obscure concealment in which she expected to pass her life, and bears her on high upon its sparkling crest, to a universal celebrity. Then all regard this countenance, which is so modest, and discern in it the indications of a force of mind, of an abnegation, of a courage, which excite astonishment among the boldest.

Such is precisely the story of Jessy Helfman.

— Stepnyak (1883), Underground Russia: Revolutionary Profiles and Sketches from Life

== Bibliography ==
- Sinkin, John (1997). "Gesia Gelfman". Spartacus Educational.
- Lincoln, W. Bruce (2000). Sunlight at Midnight: St. Petersburg and the Rise of Modern Russia. New York, NY: Basic Books. pp. 181–182. ISBN 978-0-465-08324-4.
- Croft, Lee B. (2006). Nikolai Ivanovich Kibalchich: Terrorist Rocket Pioneer. Tempe, Arizona: Institute for Issues in the History of Science. ISBN 978-1-4116-2381-1.
