= Mount Kibal'chich =

Mountain in Queen Maud Land, Antarctica

- Location within Antarctica

Highest point
- Coordinates: 71°56′S 14°19′E

Naming
- Etymology: named after the Russian revolutionary Nikolai Kibalchich

Geography
- Location: Queen Maud Land

Mount Kibal'chich is the highest peak, 2,500 metres (8,200 ft) high, of the Kvaevenutane Peaks, in the Payer Mountains of Queen Maud Land, Antarctica. It was discovered and plotted from air photos by the Third German Antarctic Expedition, 1938–39, and was mapped from air photos and surveys by the Sixth Norwegian Antarctic Expedition, 1956–60. It was remapped by the Soviet Antarctic Expedition, 1960–61, and named after the Russian revolutionary Nikolai Kibalchich.
