= Timofey Mikhailov =

Russian revolutionary (c. 1860 – 1881)

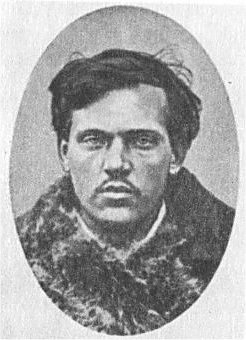
- Born: 1860; Smolensk, Russian Empire
- Died: 15 April 1881 (aged 21); Semenovsky Regiment, Saint Petersburg, Russian Empire
- Cause of death: Execution by hanging
- Other name: Sergei I. Lapin

Timofey Mikhailovich Mikhailov (Russian: Тимофе́й Михайлович Миха́йлов; c. 1860 — 15 April 1881) was a Russian revolutionary and a member of Narodnaya Volya. He was designated a bomb-thrower in the assassination of Tsar Alexander II of Russia; however, he did not throw a bomb.

Mikhailov, a discontented workman, claimed in his trial that he was motivated by a desire to improve the condition of the working classes. He was promptly condemned to death, and was hanged along with four other conspirators.

== Early life ==
Mikhailov was born c. 1860, (Note: According to his post-arrest confession he had 21 years of age.) in Smolensk. His parents Mikhail Nefedov and Natalia Savelyeva were Orthodox peasants. He had sisters Malanya and Matrena, and brothers Grigory and Stepan.

In 1875 Mikhailov moved to Saint Petersburg to earn a living. He worked as a boiler maker. Having worked in multiple plants, he left his last job in 1880 due to low wages. At this time, Mikhailov became involved in revolutionary politics and joined the Workers' Section of Narodnaya Volya. Mikhailov then started living under the false name Sergei I. Lapin.

== Assassination of Alexander II ==
Two weeks prior to the incident, Timofey Mikhailov volunteered to join the bomb-thrower unit to assassinate Tsar Alexander II, and was recruited by Andrei Zhelyabov. The group had observed that on Sundays, after the inspection of marine corps at Michael Manege, the Tsar would drive back to the Winter Palace. His route would be either by the Sadovaya Street or the Catherine Canal. The group had purchased a shop in the Sadovaya ostensibly for the sale of cheese, and used that as a cover to place dynamites under the street. If, on the other hand, the Tsar passed by the Canal, it was decided that the bomb-throwers were to be relied upon for the assassination.

On the morning of 13 March [O.S. 1 March], Mikhailov and the three other bomb-throwers collected their missiles from the group's headquarters. In the afternoon, the conspirators found that the Tsar had paid a brief visit to his cousin, the Grand Duchess Catherine, and was heading back to the Winter Palace via the road alongside the Catherine Canal. The four bomb-throwers were supposed to take up their new positions along the Canal. Mikhailov lost his nerve, returned his missile to the group's headquarters and went home. He, therefore, did not participate in the subsequent bombing attack that killed the Emperor.

== Arrest and trial ==
Two days after the assassination, Mikhailov arrived at the group's Telezhnaya quarters following the arrest of Hesya Helfman. When the police began to frisk him, Mikhailov took out a revolver and fired six shots, wounding three police officers. He was seized and was subsequently identified by Nikolai Rysakov.

During his trial, Mikhailov declared that his conduct was caused by a desire to improve the condition of the working classes. Mikhailov admitted membership in what he called The Russian Social-Revolutionary Party, but he did not plead guilty to participating in the assassination of the Emperor. On 29 March, Mikhailov and the five other defendants were found guilty, and they were sentenced to be hanged. Mikhailov petitioned for mercy, but it was disallowed since no extenuating circumstances could be found given the severity of the case.

== Execution ==
The execution took place on the morning of 15 April, in the parade grounds of the Semenovsky Regiment. The night before the execution, Mikhailov wrote a letter to his parents in the Smolensk province. That evening the Church offered its ministrations and Mikhailov made his confession.

Mikhailov was transported to the Semenovsky Regiment seated in a cart with Sophia Perovskaya and Nikolai Kibalchich. On the way, he kept bowing to people, as was customary for convicts on their way to the gallows. He shouted something several times, but according to eye-witnesses, his exact words were drowned out by the drummers of the escorting convoy.

Reportedly, during the proceedings, Mikhailov showed firmness and resignation. He and Zhelyabov approached Perovskaya and said goodbye to her with a kiss. The drums and fifes then began playing. Mikhailov was the second to be executed. Twice the rope broke under his heavy weight. First time, when the stool was pulled from under his feet, the rope broke and he crashed to the floor of the scaffold, bound and blindfolded. Mikhailov rose to his feet almost immediately, and, unaided, placed himself under the next rope. To reduce the sudden strain on the rope, Mikhailov raised his feet before the support was drawn from under him. He hung for approximately 1.5 minutes until the rope broke again. Although conscious, he was unable to rise on his own; he had to be lifted up in the arms of soldiers who would then let him drop from a fresh noose. It was reported that the crowd was at this time buzzing with indignation; some were saying that it was a sign from heaven that the criminal should be pardoned. He was finally hanged using a reinforced rope.

The body of Mikhailov and those of his companions were placed in black wooden coffins and were taken away by two carts under an escort of Cossacks. They were buried in a common grave in a remote part of the suburbs of the city.
