= Nikolai Kibalchich =

Russian revolutionary and scientist (1853–1881)

- Николай Кибальчич
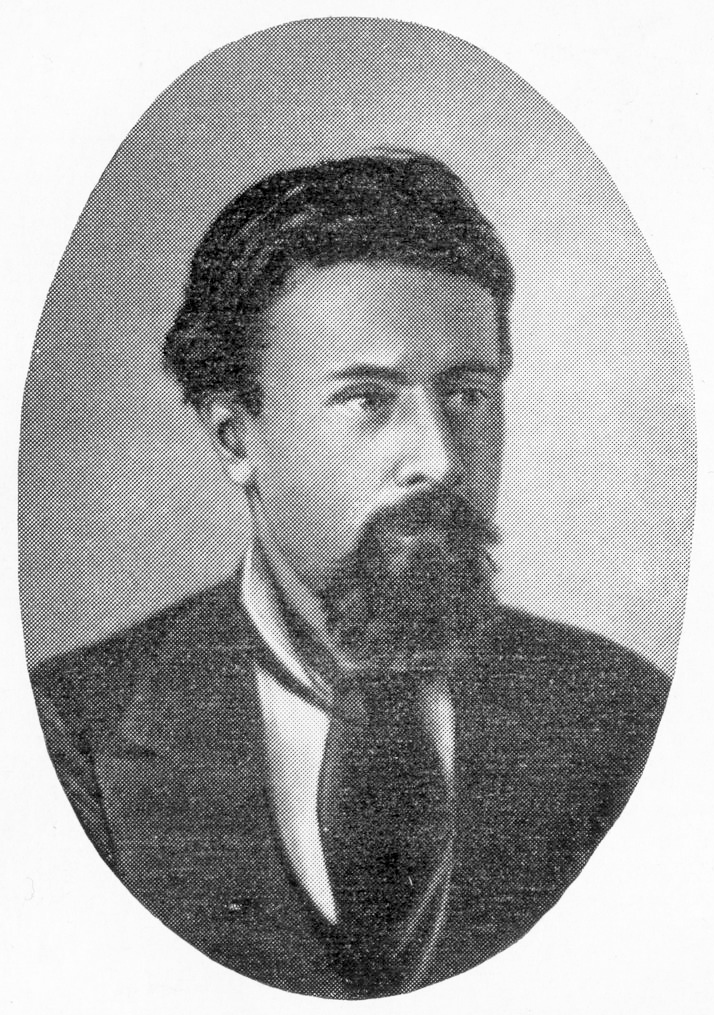
- Born: 19 October 1853; Korop, Krolevetsky Uyezd, Chernigov Governorate, Russian Empire
- Died: April 3, 1881 (aged 27); Saint Petersburg, Russian Empire
- Cause of death: Execution by hanging

Nikolai Ivanovich Kibalchich (Note: In this name that follows East Slavic naming customs, the patronymic is Ivanovich and the family name is Kibalchich.) (Note: Russian: Николай Иванович Кибальчич; Ukrainian: Микола Іванович Кибальчич, romanized: Mykola Ivanovych Kybalchych) (19 October 1853 – April 3, 1881) was a Russian revolutionary and rocket pioneer of Ukrainian-Serbian origin who took part in the assassination of Tsar Alexander II as the main explosive expert for Narodnaya Volya. He was a distant cousin of revolutionary Victor Serge.

== Early life and education ==
House where Kibalchich was born, now a historic monument of national significance in Chernihiv Oblast and a museum

Kibalchich was born in the town of Korop, Krolevetsky Uyezd, Chernigov Governorate (now Ukraine) in 1853 into a clerical family as the son of an Orthodox parish priest of Serbian origin. He entered a gymnasium in 1864 but was later admitted to a seminary. He returned to secondary school and finished with a silver medal several years later.

In 1871, he entered St Petersburg Institute of Railway Engineers, and in 1873, he entered Saint Petersburg Emperor Military Medical Academy to study medicine, additionally working on experiments into pulsed rocket propulsion.

In 1875 Kibalchich took part in propaganda work ("going to the people") in Lypovets povit (uyezd) of Kiev Governorate. In October 1875, he was arrested for lending a prohibited book to a peasant named Prytulya. He spent 3 years in Lukyanivka Prison in Kyiv.

In 1878 or 1879 Kibalchich went on to join Narodnaya Volya, becoming their main explosives expert. On 5 February 1881 his theoretical article Political Revolution and the Economic Question (Russian: Политическая революция и экономический вопрос) was published in the organization's newspaper.

== Assassination of Alexander II and aftermath ==
From February 28 to March 1, 1881 [O.S], Kibalchich and his assistants, Fleet Lieutenant Sukhanov and Mikhail Grachevsky, prepared four explosive projectiles that were used in the assassination of Alexander II. Kibalchich was arrested on March 17, 1881.

In his statement to the Special Committee of the Senate, V.N. Gerard noted that when his men came to see Kibalchich as his appointed counsel for the defense, they were surprised to find his mind occupied with things that had no bearing on the trial. He seemed to be immersed in research on some aeronautic missile and he greatly desired the opportunity to write down the calculations involved in the discovery.

In a note written in his prison cell, Kibalchich proposed a manned jet air-navigating apparatus. He examined the design of a gunpowder-powered rocket engine, controlling the flight by changing the engine's angle, and his design is dated March 23.

On March 26, General Komarov, Chief of the Gendarmery Department, informed the Police Department of Kibalchich's design. The brief written in the report said: "To be filed with the March 1 dossier and to give this to scientists for consideration now would hardly be expedient since this can only give rise to a lot of wanton talk. Kibalchich's design was put in an envelope, sealed and filed. The inventor was told that his design would be handed over to scientists for examination."

On March 31, Kibalchich wrote this solicitation address to the Minister of Interior: "By instruction of your Excellency my design of an aeronautic apparatus has been submitted for the consideration of technical committee; could your Excellency direct that I be allowed to meet with any of the committee members on the matter of this design not later than tomorrow morning or at least to receive a written answer from the experts who have examined my design, also no longer than tomorrow. I also ask your Excellency for permission for me, before I die, to meet with all my comrades in the trial or at least with Zhelyabov and Perovskaya." All of his requests were ignored.

On the eve of his execution, Kibalchich wrote a personal letter to Alexander III of Russia, demanding from the tsar to provide democratic freedoms to his subjects.

== Execution ==
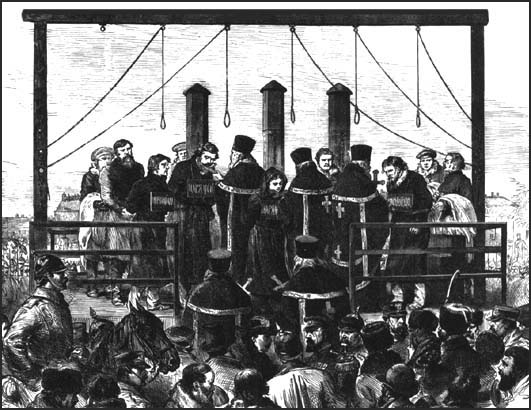
Nikolai Kibalchich being executed with other revolutionaries

On April 3 at 7:50 AM, two "chariots of shame" with the condemned prisoners rode out of the house of the detention to Shpalernaya Street. Zhelyabov was in the first, and by his side was Rysakov, who had tossed the first bomb at the coach of Alexander II and then betrayed his comrades during the interrogation. Kibalchich, Perovskaya and Mikhailov were in the second. The hands and feet of the condemned were tied to the seats. Each had on his chest a black plaque with a white colored inscription: "A regicide". At 9:21 AM, Kibalchich was executed by hanging, shortly followed by other Narodnaya Volya plotters including Sophia Perovskaya, Andrei Zhelyabov, Nikolai Rysakov and Timofei Mikhailov.

== Final letter ==
I, Nikolai Kibalchich, am writing down this design in prison with several days to go before my execution. I believed in the practicability of my idea and this belief sustains me in my appalling situation by scientists and specialists who show my idea to be practicable, I will feel happy in the knowledge that I have rendered an immense service to my country and mankind. I will then calmly meet death, knowing that my idea will not die with me but will remain with mankind for which I prepared to sacrifice my life. That is why I pray to those scientists who will examine my design that they treat it with the utmost seriousness and good faith and let me know their answer as soon as possible.

First and foremost I need it necessary to note that, when at large, I did not have time to elaborate my design in details and prove its feasibility mathematically. Now it is, of course impossible for me to obtain the materials necessary for that. Consequently, this task that of substantiating my design with mathematical calculation will have to be done by those experts into whose hands my design will find its way.

Besides, I am not familiar with the mass of similar design which have, appeared lately; that is to say I am aware of the idea behind those designs but I am not familiar with the way whereby the inventors hope to carry them out. As far as I know, however my idea has not yet been proposed by anyone else.

In my thought about an aeronautic machine I have concentrated mainly on this question: what force has to be applied in order to set such machine in motion? In my opinion it is slowly burning explosive substances that can provide such a force.

In fact, the combustion of explosive substance results with a comparative rapidity in large quantity of gases possessing a huge energy at the instance of their formation. But can one use the energy of gases, formed by explosive ignition, to perform work of any duration? This is possible only if the huge energy of explosive combustion, rather than last instantaneously, will be generated during a more or less prolonged period of time.

— Nikolai Kibalchich, The Dream of a propulsive device by a Scientist that was stolen by death

== Legacy ==
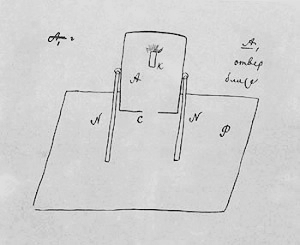
Kibalchich's drawing of his proposed rocket

Kibalchich's design was buried in the archives of Police Department. Much was said and written about Kibalchich's design abroad, and many conjectures were made about the essence of the invention and its subsequent fate. In 1917, Nikolai Rynin, after hearing rumors of the design, rediscovered the manuscript in the archives and published an account of it 1918 in the historic magazine Byloye (Былое, The Past), including Kibalchich's description of a manned, rocket-propelled ship from his final letter.

In 1891, similar ideas were developed independently by the German engineer Hermann Ganswindt. After WWII, Stanislaw Ulam proposed a nuclear pulse propulsion scheme which was studied in Project ORION.

In his article from 1897, Ivan Franko mentioned Kibalchich and his colleague Andrei Zhelyabov as prominent examples of Ukrainians who dedicated themselves to the fight for an all-Russian revolution, instead of struggling for the autonomy of their people.

The International Astronomical Union honoured Kibalchich by naming a crater on the moon after him, which is centered at 2.72° N 147.18° W on the Moon's far side. Mount Kibal'chich, which is the highest peak of the Kvaevenutane Peaks in Antarctica, is also named after him.

Korop organized a house-museum and erected a monument in honor of Kibalchich.
