= Special Tribunal of the Ruling Senate =

Special Tribunal of the Ruling Senate for Investigation of Crimes Against State and Illegal Associations (Russian: Особое присутствие правительствующего Сената для суждения дел о государственных преступлениях и противозаконных сообществах) was a judicial body in Imperial Russia, established on June 7 of 1872 by the order of Alexander II due to his discontent over the sentence, awarded by the Petersburg Court of Law to the defendants of the Nechayevtsy Trial.

The Special Presence consisted of 6 senators (chairman and 5 members) and 3 representatives from different social estates - Marshal of the Nobility (nobility), mayor (urban commoners), and volost foreman (peasants). The Special Presence conducted all of the large-scale political trials of the 1870s-1880s, such as the Trial of the 193, Trial of the 50, trials of the South Russia Worker’s Union etc. The activity of the Special Presence decreased after the adoption of the Law on Temporary Subjection of Cases Dealing with Crimes Against State and Some Other Crimes Against Government Officials to Military Court ("О временном подчинении дел о государственных преступлениях и некоторых преступлениях против должностных лиц в ведение военного суда, установленного для военного времени"; August 9, 1878). The Special Presence reanimated its activities during the Russian Revolution of 1905-1907 and Pyotr Stolypin’s premiership (the cases of Ivan Kalyayev, social-democratic faction of the State Duma etc.).

The Special Presence of the Ruling Senate existed until the February Revolution of 1917.
