= Michael Manege =

Historic building and exhibition hall in Saint Petersburg, Russia

Zimniy Stadion Mikhailovsky Manege
- Михайловский манеж (Зимний стадион)
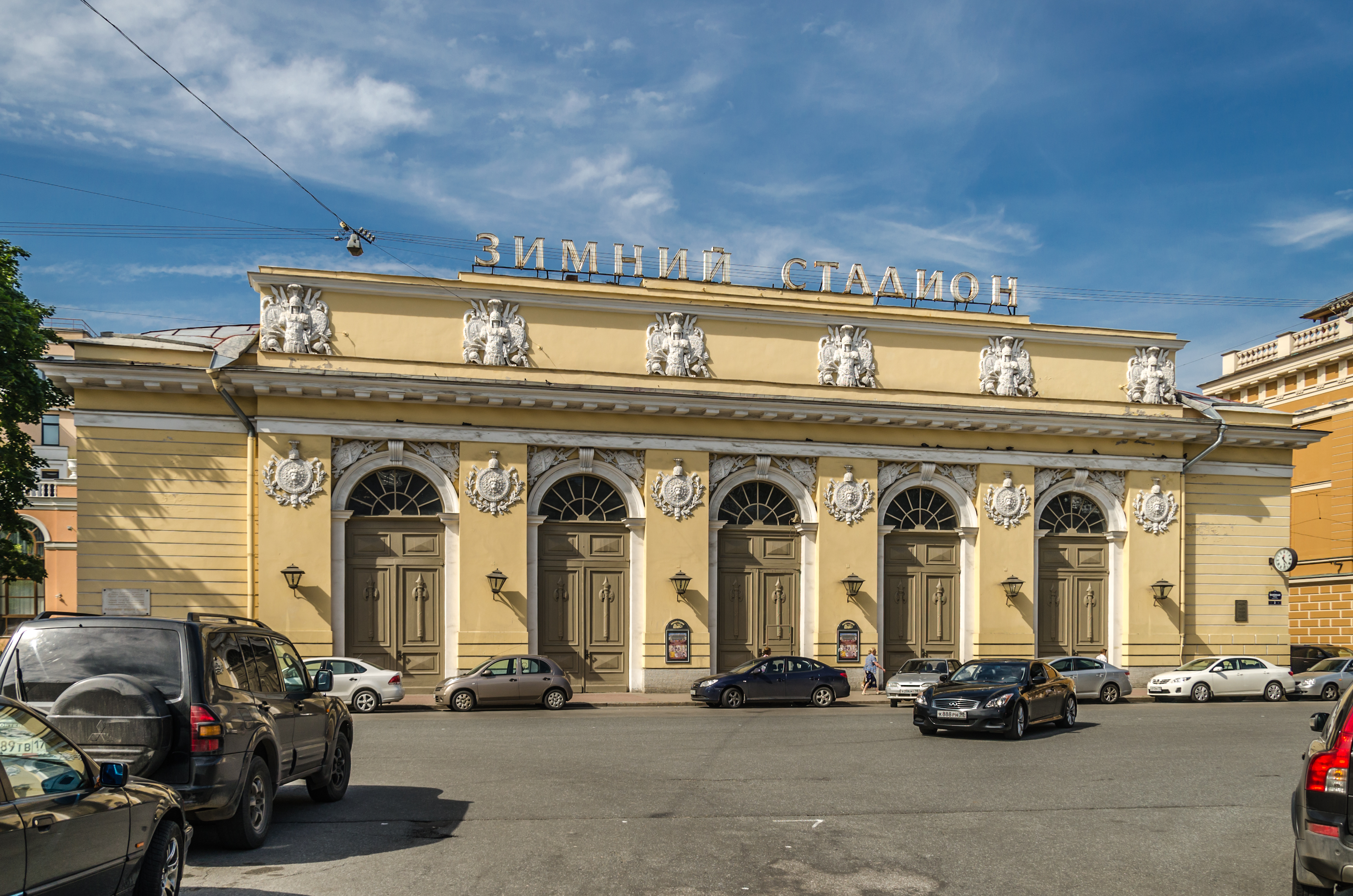
- Interactive map of the Zimniy Stadion; Mikhailovsky Manege area

General information
- Location: Saint Petersburg, Manezhnaya Square, 6, Russian Federation
- Coordinates: 59°56′11″N 30°20′22″E
- Construction started: 1798
- Completed: 1800
- Renovated: 1824

Technical details
- Floor area: 4,356 square metres (46,890 sq ft)

Design and construction
- Architect: Vincenzo Brenna

Renovating team
- Architect: Carlo Rossi
- Other designers: V.Demuth-Malinovsky; S.S.Pimenov

Other information
- Seating capacity: 2000

Website
- http://www.restec.ru/manezh.ru.html

References
- object # 7810640007

Michael Manege (Russian: Михайловский манеж, Mikhailovsky manezh) is the Neoclassical building of an early 19th-century riding academy in the historic center of Saint Petersburg, Russia. It was converted into an indoor sporting arena in 1949 and was renamed Zimniy Stadion (Russian: Зимний стадион, lit. "Winter Stadium").

== Name ==
Similar to the neighboring Mikhailovsky Castle the name "Mikhailovsky" comes from the Archangel Michael, a heavenly patron of the House of Romanov, the ruling dynasty of the Russian Empire in 1613–1917. "Manège" is French for "riding academy", since the area was originally used as a dressage area for horses of the imperial cavalry. The square in which the monument sits is called Manezhnaya Square (Russian: Манежная площадь).

== History ==
The history of Manezhnaya Square and the Mikhailovsky Manège dates to the 1730s, when a Persian shah, Nader, who signed a treaty with the Russian Empire in Ganja in March 1735, sent an elephant as a gift to the Russian empress, Anna of Russia, the niece of Peter the Great. To keep that gift alive, an "elephant yard"—actually, the first zoo—was built on what is today Manezhnaya Square. Very soon, a "beast yard" (Russian: зверовой двор) for other animals was put nearby, along with a greenhouse to grow plants to feed them.

However, the elephant could not bear loneliness and the heavy northern climate of Petersburg. So in 1741, the Persian shah sent a caravan of 14 elephants. A house for them was built where the Manège is now located. From this "stable", elephants were regularly taken for walks across the current Manezhnaya Square. In 1742, the new empress, Elizabeth of Russia, began construction of a new Summer Palace for herself nearby. The zoo was moved away, and on the place of the stables a labyrinth garden was built with interlocking lanes and clipped shrubs. The wooden Summer Palace stood for half a century until the reign of Paul I of Russia, when it was dismantled, freeing up space for the stables and manège.

== Architecture ==
The Mikhailovsky Manège is an elegant, spare structure faced in stucco of cream-yellow and white. It was built in 1798–1800 by Vincenzo Brenna, an Italian architect and painter who was the court architect of Paul I. Brenna is considered a precursor of romantic neoclassicism, when some elements of the late baroque are combined with romanticism and classicism.

A quarter of a century later, tastes changed, and in 1823–1824 architect Carlo Rossi renovated the facades in classic style upon his joint project with two Russian sculptors, Vasily Demuth-Malinovsky and Stepan Pimenov. The facade of the building, which faces the square with its five doorways, and the attic, were decorated with bas-reliefs of military armor and bas-relief shields with swords and oak branches. This design reflects the use of the Manège by the War Ministry as a dressage spot for the horses of imperial cavalry. For the same reason, the building was sometimes called by a Russian name of German origin, "экзерциргауз" (German: Exerzierhaus, lit. "house for exercises").

== Exhibition area ==
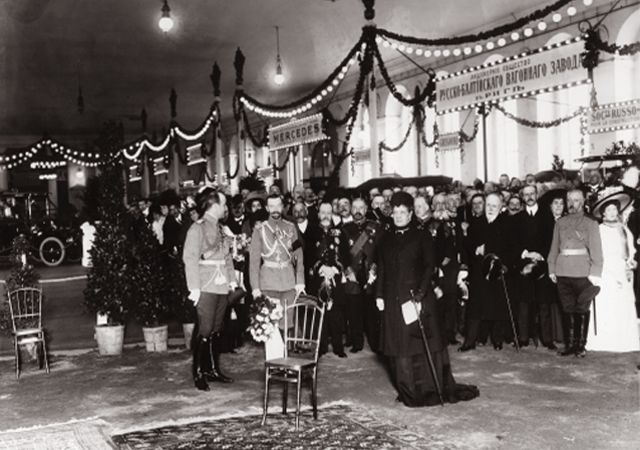
The III All-Russian (International) Exhibition. In the centre: Grand Duke Boris Vladimirovich.

In the years of economic expansion following the Emancipation reform of 1861, the Mikhailovsky Manège became one of the city spots for agricultural and industrial exhibitions. The Imperial Gardeners' Society was among the most regular tenants of this hall. In 1893, the First All-Russian Hygiene Exhibition took place here; in 1909, the International Exhibition of the Latest Innovations, at which the All-Russian Aero Club formed the core of the national exhibition stand.

In 1902, the Imperial Russian Automobile Society was created. In 1907 it leased the Manège for the international All-Russian Automobile Exposition for the first time. The second exhibition took place in 1908 in Moscow. In 1910, exhibitors returned to Petersburg, where on 28 [O.S. 15 May] 1910 the III International Automobile Exposition was opened, again in Mikhailovsky Manège. The following day, on 29 [O.S. 16 May] 1910, the international rally "Petersburg—Kiev" for the prize of Nicholas II started. Forty-eight cars set out from Mikhailovsky Manège for the starting line of this rally at Tsarskoye Selo. Russia was represented with national brand Russo-Balt; among the other participating brands were Adler, Mercedes, Delaunay-Belleville, Mors (France), Benz & Cie., Itala, and many others.

Atomexpo was held there in June 2013.

== Political events ==
The October Manifesto issued on 30 October [O.S. 17 October] 1905, allowing the formation of political parties in Russia, brought the demand for facilities for public gatherings. In harsh climatic conditions (long winters, flanked on both sides with the long months of bad weather, slush and mud), the need for indoor facilities was especially urgent. Mikhailovsky Manège, located about 200 metres (660 ft) north from Nevsky Prospekt, was selected.

The Union of the Russian People (URP), a close-to-extremist nationalistic movement formed with substantial overt and covert support from the Russian authorities, was among the first to use this government-owned building for their political gathering. Nine days after the Manifest was proclaimed, on 8 November [O.S. 26 October] 1905, the URP announced its founding; and in less than a fortnight, on 21 November [O.S. 8] 1905 the crowd of about 2000 people gathered under the roof of Mikhailovsky Manège. Orchestral music was playing, the church choir sang Praise God and Tzar Divine, and the leaders of URP addressed the mob from a rostrum erected in the centre of the arena.

In 1913, when the 300th anniversary of the House of Romanovs was celebrated throughout Russia, Mikhailovsky Manège was the site for different public venues associated with this occasion, which included several exhibitions.

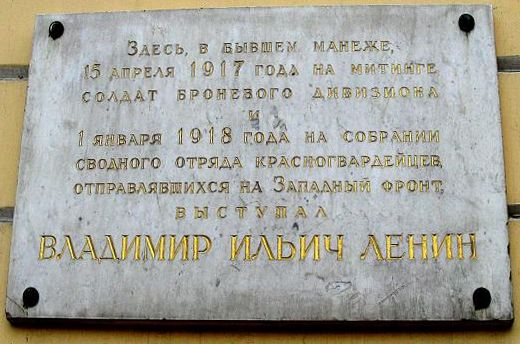
Memorial plaque commemorating the two speeches delivered by Vladimir Lenin in Mikhailovsky Manège.

The most turbulent time in the political life of Petersburg (renamed Petrograd between 1914 and 1924) came after the abdication of Nicholas II in March 1917. Rarely did a day between the February Revolution and the October Revolution pass without rallies and meetings, both spontaneous and organized, taking place all over the city. The left-wing political forces intensified their activities in Petrograd in April, when Vladimir Lenin and the other leaders of the Bolshevik section of the Russian Social Democratic Labour Party returned to democratic Russia from emigration. On April 15, 1917 Lenin came to the rally at Mikhailovsky Manège and delivered a speech to the soldiers of the Armored Car division. The second and last time that Lenin spoke at the Manège was on January 1, 1918, when he addressed the regiment of soldiers about to set out to the Western Front. A plaque of white marble, mounted on the wall of Manège, commemorates these two events in the political history of the city and country.

That speech of Lenin on the first day of 1918 at Mikhailovsky Manège marked a turn in the policy of the new Soviet government regarding war and peace. The slogan "Peace to the people", under which the October Revolution gained mass support, lost its relevance due to the resumption of German attacks on Russia, so Lenin had to explain to the soldiers why they should resume fighting. A special guest at this rally was Albert Rhys Williams from the United States. As soon as Lenin stepped down from the top of an armored car from which he spoke, Nikolai Podvoisky, a Soviet defence minister and the organizer of the event, gave the floor to an American speaker.

Shortly after this rally, the first attempt was made on Lenin's life. As his car drove away from Mikhailovsky Manège, a group of terrorists— among them the best sharpshooters in the Russian Army—who were hiding in ambush in the next lane began shooting, shattering the windshield. Lenin was sitting in the back seat with Fritz Platten. When the shooting started, "Platten grabbed Lenin by the head and pushed him down. ... Platten’s hand was covered in blood, having been grazed by a bullet as he was shielding Lenin." Lenin was not hurt.

== Literature ==
- Shvidkovsky, D. S. (2007). Russian architecture and the West. Yale University Press. ISBN 978-0-300-10912-2.
- Alexander Rabinowitch (2004). The Bolsheviks come to power: the Revolution of 1917 in Petrograd. Pluto Press. p. 432. ISBN 0-7453-2269-7.
- Technical data on exhibition capacities — an official portal of the Government of St.Petersburg
