= Andrei Zhelyabov =

Russian revolutionary

- Андрей Желябов
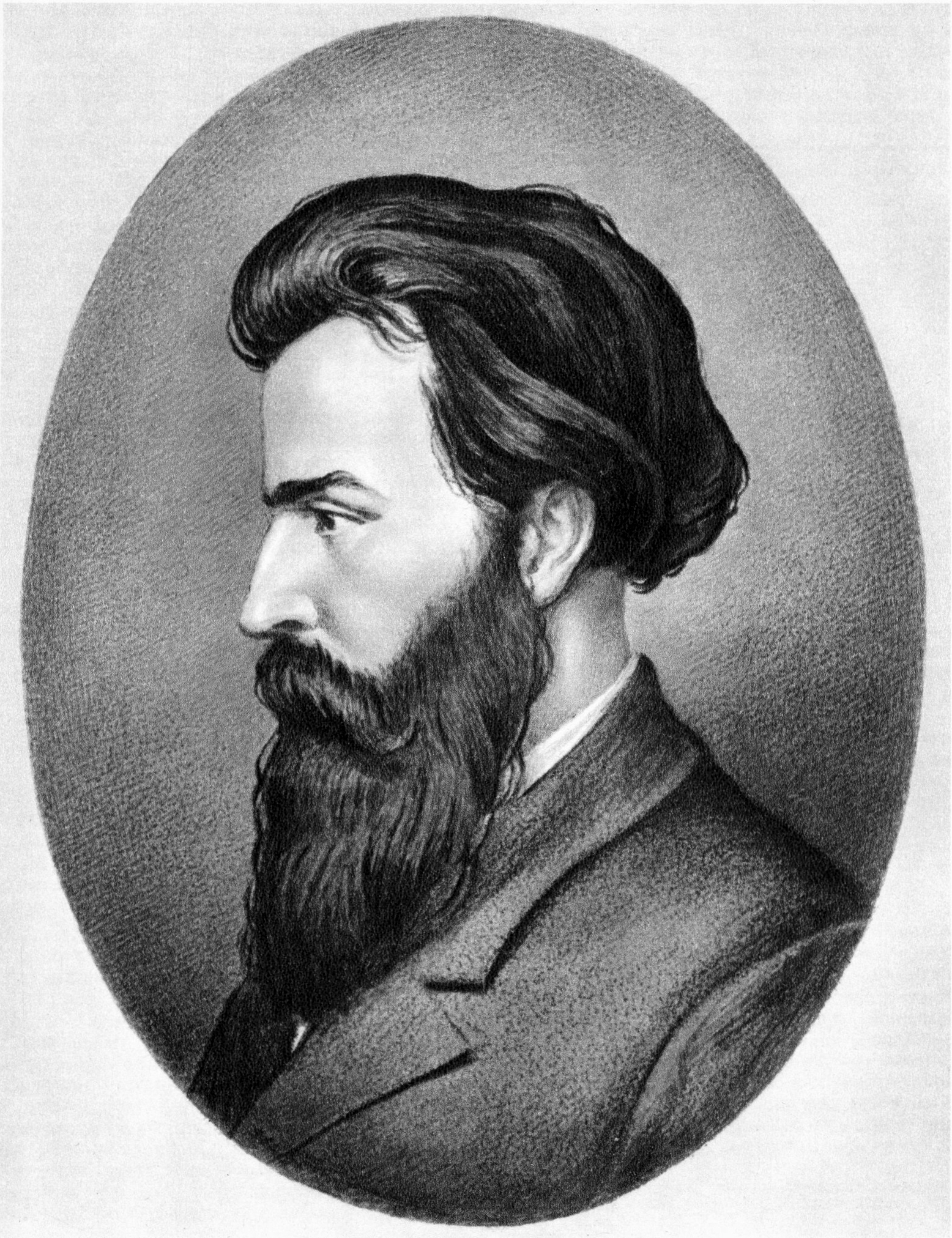
- Born: 17 August 1851; Nikolayevka, Feodosiya uyezd, Taurida Governorate, Russian Empire
- Died: 3 April 1881 (aged 29); Semenovsky Regiment Garrison, Saint-Petersburg, Russian Empire
- Cause of death: Execution by hanging
- Spouse: Olga Zhelyabova (née Yakhnenko)
- Partner: Sophia Perovskaya

Andrei Ivanovich Zhelyabov (Russian: Андрей Иванович Желябов; 29 August [O.S. 17 August] 1851 – 15 April [O.S. 3 April] 1881) was a Russian revolutionary and member of the executive committee of Narodnaya Volya.

Zhelyabov was born in to a family of serfs. After graduating from a gymnasium in Kerch in 1869, Zhelyabov got into a Law School of the Novorossiysky University in Odessa. He was expelled from the university for his participation in student unrests in October 1871 and sent away from Odessa. In 1873, Zhelyabov lived in a town of Gorodische (present-day Cherkas'ka oblast' of Ukraine) and maintained close ties with revolutionaries from Kiev and activists of the Ukrainian "Hromada". After his return to Odessa, Zhelyabov became a member of the revolutionary Felix Volkhovsky group (the Odessa affiliate of “Chaikovtsi”) and conducted propaganda among workers and intelligentsia. He was arrested in late 1874 and then released on bail. Nevertheless, he continued his illegal activities. Zhelyabov was one of the suspects in the "Trial of the 193". After his acquittal in 1878, he moved to Podolia province for the purpose of spreading revolutionary propaganda among the peasantry.

Zhelyabov gradually came to support violent political struggle and terror. He participated in the Lipetsk Congress of political terrorists in June 1879. Zhelyabov was accepted in “Zemlya i volya” at the Voronezh Congress of its members and came forward as one of the chief defenders of terrorism. After the split of "Zemlya i volya", he was one of the main organizers of "Narodnaya volya" and its newspaper "Worker’s Gazette" (fall of 1880). Zhelyabov took active part in devising a few of the most important documents of the party's Program. He was also a chief organizer of the assassination of Alexander II of Russia on March 1, 1881, though he was arrested a few days before it actually happened. Zhelyabov demanded that his case be considered together with the case of the Pervomartovtsi. He was executed by hanging on April 3, 1881, with the rest of the terrorists, including his wife Sophia Perovskaya.

In admiration of Zhelyabov's dedication to his revolutionary cause, Vladimir Lenin went as far as to compare him with other great revolutionaries, such as Maximilien Robespierre and Giuseppe Garibaldi. Zhelyabov is the protagonist of Yuri Trifonov's novel The Impatient Ones (1973).
