= Subbotin =

Subbotin or Subotin (masculine, Cyrillic: Субботин, Суботин) and Subbotina or Subotina (feminine, Cyrillic: Субботина, Суботина) is a Russian surname originating from the Slavic name Subbota or Subota. Originally this name was given to a boy who was born on Saturday (Russian: Суббота). The surname may refer to the following notable people:

- Aleksandr Subbotin (born 1991), Russian footballer
- Andrei Subbotin (born 1973), Russian ice hockey player
- Evgeniia Subbotina (1853–1930), Russian revolutionary
- Igor Subbotin (born 1990), Estonian footballer
- Mikhail Subbotin (1893–1966), Soviet astronomer
  - Subbotin (crater), lunar crater
  - 1692 Subbotina, main-belt asteroid named after Mikhail Subbotin
- Maria Subbotina (1854–1878), Russian revolutionary
- Milan Subotin (born 1984), Serbian politician
- Nadezhda Subbotina (1855–1930), Russian revolutionary
- Pyotr Subbotin-Permyak (1886–1923), Russian avant-guardist painter
- Serafim Subbotin (1921–1996), Soviet pilot
- Sergey Subbotin (born 1955), Russian politician
- Sofya Subbotina (1830–1919), Russian revolutionary

== See also ==
- Subota (disambiguation)
- Subbotin oil field, a continental shelf oil field in Ukraine
