= Evgeniia Subbotina =

Russian revolutionary (1853 – c. 1930)

- Евгения Субботина
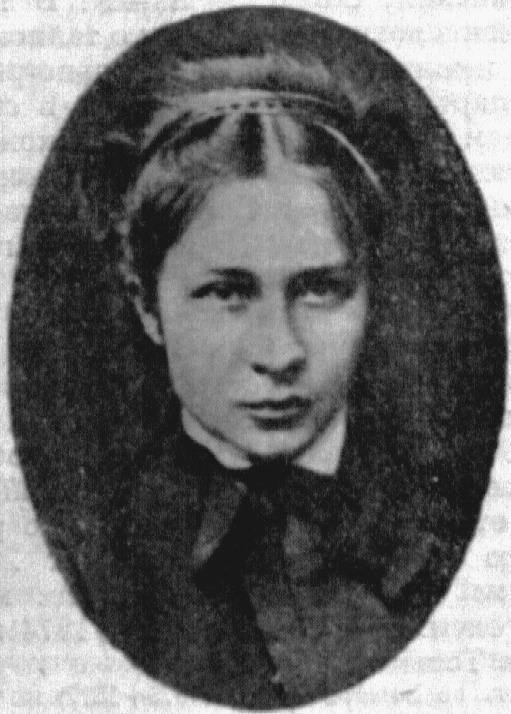
- Subbotina in 1875
- Born: 1853; Podvorgolskoye, Oryol, Russian Empire
- Died: c. 1930 (aged 76–77); Moscow, Soviet Union
- Education: University of Zurich
- Organization: All-Russian Socialist-Revolutionary Organisation
- Movement: Narodniks
- Criminal charges: Anti-government propaganda
- Criminal penalty: Exile to Siberia
- Spouse: Vladimir Kozlovsky
- Parents: Dmitrii Subbotin (father); Sofya Subbotina (mother)
- Relatives: Maria and Nadezhda (sisters)

Evgeniia Dmitrievna Subbotina (Russian: Евгения Дмитриевна Субботина; 1853–c. 1930) was a Russian revolutionary. Born into a noble family in Oryol, she was educated in Moscow and moved abroad to Zürich, where she pursued her higher education and became involved in revolutionary socialist circles led by Pyotr Lavrov and Sophia Bardina. Upon her return to Russia, she took part in revolutionary agitation and propaganda, for which she was arrested and sentenced in the Trial of the 50 to exile in Siberia. Her attempts to escape failed, but she was able to assist the escape of other exiled revolutionary women. Subbotina herself remained in exile until the 1890s, when she was permitted to return to her home province of Oryol. After the establishment of the Soviet Union, she joined the Society of Former Political Prisoners and Exiled Settlers.

== Biography ==
=== Early life ===
Evgeniia Dmitrievna Subbotina was born in 1853, in the village of Podvorgolskoye, in the Oryol Governorate of the Russian Empire. Evgeniia was the eldest daughter of a noble landowner, Dmitrii Subbotin, who died shortly after the birth of his youngest daughter Nadezhda, leaving his children with a considerable inheritance. The girls' mother, Sofya Subbotina, endeavoured to provide them with the best possible education, enrolling them at a girls' school in Moscow in 1868.

=== Studies and activism abroad ===
After graduating in 1872, Evgeniia went abroad to study at the University of Zurich, along with Anna Toporkova and her younger sister Maria Subbotina. There she joined a student circle led by Pyotr Lavrov, for whom she worked as a typesetter for his magazine Vpered, as well as the Fritschi women's circle. Subbotina and Vera Lyubatovich, another member of Fritschi group, formed a close alliance with the city's Georgian nationalist students, led by Ivan Dzhandabari, with whom they discussed the formation of a new revolutionary socialist political party. When Dzhandabari met with the women's group, he found Subbotina competing with her comrades for the attention of the group's leader Sophia Bardina.

=== Activism, arrest and trial ===
Subbotina was forbidden by the Tsarist government from completing her studies in Zurich, so in 1873, she moved to Geneva and then to Paris. In August 1874, she returned to Russia, settling briefly in the Kursk Governorate before moving to Moscow at the end of the year. In February 1875, she participated in the founding of the All-Russian Socialist-Revolutionary Organisation, within which she conducted propaganda among the city's industrial workers. She briefly moved to Saint Petersburg in order to care for her sick mother Sofya, but by August 1875, had returned to Moscow with typescript she had purchased in the imperial capital. She was arrested on 13 August at the flat of Antimoz Gamkrelidze, but quickly released after a brief interrogation. She took the opportunity to destroy her typescript before she was arrested again. After she was detained a second time, she fell ill with dysentery, which forced the authorities to have her transferred to a hospital. After she recovered, she was transferred to Saint Petersburg and held in pre-trial detention, until she was tried for anti-government propaganda, in both the Trial of the 193 and the Trial of the 50.

=== Exile and later life ===
She was acquitted in the Trial of the 193 on 19 February 1876, after the court found a lack of evidence for the charges against her. But on 14 March 1877, she was found guilty in the trial of the 50, which ordered her to be deprived of all her rights and exiled to Irkutsk province for 4 years. She was held in the capital's Litovsk Castle until the summer of 1878, while she recovered from her illness. On 2 August 1878, she was transferred to Siberia; she arrived in Tyumen on 17 August 1878 and was subsequently settled in the village of Tunka. On 28 January 1879, she attempted to escape her Siberian exile, getting as far as Irkutsk before she was apprehended and transferred to the settlement of Verkholensk.

In 1882, her family began petitioning for her to be transferred to Tomsk, on account of her poor health, but their appeals were repeatedly denied. She was instead transferred to Irkutsk, where she lived with Varvara Alexandrova and aided the escape of Catherine Breshkovsky from Barguzin, Yelizaveta Kovalskaya and Sofya Bogomolets from Irkutsk. For this, she was exiled again to Verkholensk. There, on 1 June 1884, she married her fellow exile Vladimir Kozlovsky. By this time, petitions for her transfer to Tomsk had finally achieved success; she left for the city in May 1885. In February 1888, she was able to visit her sick mother in Minusinsk. On 29 March 1889, Subbotina was finally released from exile and her rights were restored, although she was to be kept in her chosen place of residence for 5 additional years, under strict police surveillance. In May 1889, she moved to Warsaw, in Congress Poland. She petitioned repeatedly for the removal of her police supervision, but these were all rejected. In September 1892, she was granted permission to return to her home province of Oryol and, on 22 November 1892, was finally released from police surveillance and her rights to live anywhere within the Empire were restored.

After the establishment of the Soviet Union, in 1930, she joined the Society of Former Political Prisoners and Exiled Settlers.

== Selected works ==
- Subbotina, Evgeniia Dmitrievna (1928). На революционном пути [On the Revolutionary Way]. Каторга и ссылка. Vol. 11. Moscow: Society of Former Political Prisoners and Exiled Settlers.

== Bibliography ==
- Engel, Barbara Alpern; Rosenthal, Clifford N., eds. (1992) [1975]. Five Sisters: Women Against the Tsar. Routledge. ISBN 0-415-90715-2.
- Porter, Cathy (1976). Fathers and Daughters: Russian Women in Revolution. London: Virago Press. ISBN 0-704-32802-X. OCLC 2288139.
- Shilov, A. A.; Karnaukhova, M. G., eds. (1932). "Субботина, Евгения Дмитриевна" [Subbotina, Evgeniia Dmitrievna]. Деятели революционного движения в России (in Russian). Vol. 4. Moscow: Society of Former Political Prisoners and Exiled Settlers. pp. 1634–1637. OCLC 749336544.
