= Maria Subbotina =

Russian revolutionary (1854–1878)

- Мария Субботина
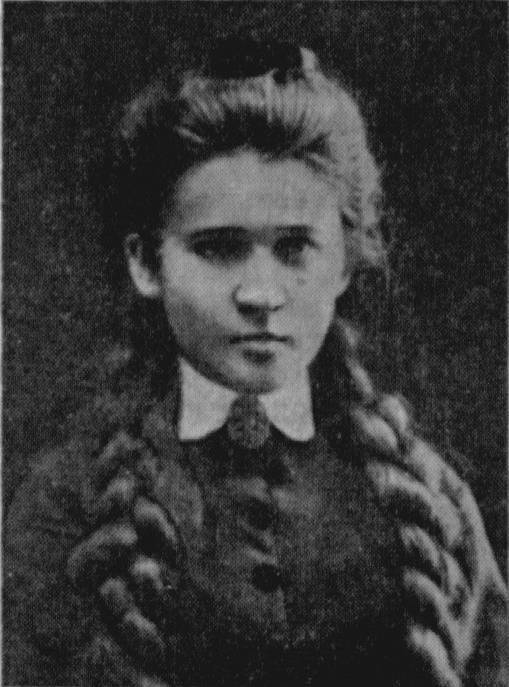
- Subbotina in 1876
- Born: 1854; Podvorgolskoye, Oryol Governorate, Russian Empire
- Died: 8 February 1878 (aged 23–24); Novouzensk, Samara, Russian Empire
- Education: University of Zurich; Sorbonne University
- Political party: Land and Liberty
- Other political affiliations: All-Russian Socialist-Revolutionary Organisation
- Movement: Narodniks
- Parents: Dmitrii Subbotin (father); Sofya Subbotina (mother)
- Relatives: Evgeniia and Nadezhda (sisters)

Maria Dmitrievna Subbotina (Russian: Мария Дмитриевна Субботина; 1854–1878) was a Russian Narodnik revolutionary. Born into a noble family in the Oryol, she was educated in Moscow and moved abroad to study medicine at the University of Zurich. In Switzerland, she became involved in the socialist circles led by Pyotr Lavrov and Mikhail Bakunin, the latter of whom she followed to Zagreb in order to organise among Serbian nationalists planning the Herzegovina uprising. In 1874, she returned to Russia, where she began organising factory works in Ivanovo and Moscow. She was arrested for her activities and tried in the Trial of the 50, which sentenced her to exile in Siberia, although her sentence was lessened to exile in the Volga region, as she had fallen seriously ill. She died of tuberculosis while in exile in Novouzensk.

== Biography ==
Maria Dmitrievna Subbotina was born in 1854, in the village of Podvorgolskoye, in the Oryol Governorate of the Russian Empire. She was the second daughter of a noble landowner, Dmitrii Subbotin, who died shortly after the birth of his youngest daughter Nadezhda, leaving his children with a considerable inheritance. The girls' mother, Sofya Subbotina, endeavoured to provide them with the best possible education, enrolling them at a girls' school in Moscow in 1868.

She never formally graduated from school, as in 1872, she decided to follow her older sister Evgeniia and her friend Anna Toporkova in travelling abroad to Zürich, where she enrolled in the medical faculty of the University of Zurich. She quickly came to dislike life in Switzerland, remarking that "in despotical Russia life is easier. There is not this depressing atmosphere of routine and habit as here in "free" Switzerland". There she joined a Russian student circle led by Pyotr Lavrov, who she became a follower of, working as a typesetter for his magazine Vpered. She also joined the Fritschi women's group.

When the Tsarist government issued a ban on women studying in Zürich, in 1874, she moved to Paris, in order to pursue her medical studies at Sorbonne University. But she did not graduate, as the anarchist revolutionary Mikhail Bakunin had invited her to Zagreb in order to work with local Serbian nationalists, who were in the middle of preparations for the Herzegovina uprising. She and Olga Lyubatovich, both followers of Bakunin, travelled to the Balkans, where they joined a local Serbian socialist organisation.

Together with other women from the Zürich socialist group, she subsequently returned to Russia, where they took up political activism. Together with Varvara Alexandrova and Anna Toporkova, she went to work in a factory in Ivanovo and lived together in Toporkova's flat. Subbotina was implicated in the Trial of the 193 due to her mother's arrest in September 1874. She was initially prevented from leaving the Kursk Governorate, but by 19 February 1876, she had been acquitted due to a lack of evidence.

During this time, she moved to Moscow, where she joined the All-Russian Socialist-Revolutionary Organisation. She fell ill with tuberculosis, so was unable to actively participate in its propaganda activities, but oversaw the supplying of propagandists with money and books. On 12 August 1875, her flat in Ivanovo was raided and she was arrested together with Alexandrova and Toporkova. Subbotina was transferred to Moscow, where she was incarcerated in Butyrka prison while awaiting trial. After attempting suicide due to the harsh conditions of her imprisonment, her condition worsened and she was granted compassionate release in 1876.

Before long, she had joined back up with the Narodniks and participated in the founding of the Land and Liberty organisation. On 30 November 1876, she was named as a participant in subversive anti-government activities in the Trial of the 50, which saw her arrested again and confined in pre-trial detention. On 14 March 1877, she was found guilty of belonging to an illegal political organisation and sentenced to exile in the Tomsk Governorate, where she would be deprived of her rights and prevented from leaving the province. However, due to the circumstances of her illness, on 14 August 1877, the court accepted an appeal to replace her sentence with exile to the Samara Governorate. In autumn of 1877, she was transferred to Novouzensk, where she died from tuberculosis on 8 February 1878.

== Bibliography ==
- Engel, Barbara Alpern; Rosenthal, Clifford N., eds. (1992) [1975]. Five Sisters: Women Against the Tsar. Routledge. ISBN 0-415-90715-2.
- Porter, Cathy (1976). Fathers and Daughters: Russian Women in Revolution. London: Virago Press. ISBN 0-704-32802-X. OCLC 2288139.
- Shilov, A. A.; Karnaukhova, M. G., eds. (1932). "Субботина, Мария Дмитриевна" [Subbotina, Maria Dmitrievna]. Деятели революционного движения в России (in Russian). Vol. 4. Moscow: Society of Former Political Prisoners and Exiled Settlers. pp. 1637–1639. OCLC 749336544.
