= Evgeniia Zavadskaia =

Russian revolutionary (1852–1883)

- Евгения Завадская
- Born: Evgeniia Florianovna Zavadskaia; 1852; Valuysky Uyezd, Voronezh Governorate, Russian Empire
- Died: 18 August 1883 (aged 30–31); Geneva, Switzerland
- Cause of death: Suicide by poisoning
- Education: University of Zurich
- Occupations: Schoolteacher, midwife
- Political party: Narodnaya Volya
- Movement: Narodniks
- Spouse: Andriy Frandzholi (m. 1879; died 1883)

Evgeniia Florianovna Zavadskaia (Russian: Евгения Флориановна Завадская; 1852–1883) was a Russian Narodnik revolutionary. Having become involved in radical student groups while studying at the University of Zurich, upon her return to Russia, she worked as a schoolteacher and carried out agitational propaganda among the peasantry. She was arrested for her activism and tried in the Trial of the 193, but was acquitted. After returning to revolutionary activities, she was deported to Vologda province, but escaped with her husband Andriy Frandzholi. She then became involved with Narodnaya Volya during its plot to carry out the assassination of Alexander II of Russia. Although she attempted to continue her activities, her husband's illness forced her to take him abroad; the day he died, she committed suicide.

== Biography ==
Evgeniia Zavadskaia was born in Voronezh province, in 1852, the daughter of a small landowner. After receiving an education at the women's school in Voronezh, in 1870, she moved to Saint Petersburg, where she studied obstetrics. In 1872, she went abroad to study medicine at the University of Zurich. There she met a number of Russian Narodnik students, and joined the Fritschi circle. During the conflict between the Bakuninists and Lavrovists, she sided with the latter. In April 1873, she attacked Mikhail Sazhin, who led the Bakuninist student circle in Zurich. After the Tsarist government ordered that female students in Zurich return to Russia, she briefly went to Paris before going back to Voronezh province, where she established a school and distributed propaganda to the local peasantry.

In 1874, she moved to Belomestnoye, where she worked as a teacher at a school ran by Sofya Subbotina. By 1 September of that year, she was arrested for her propaganda activities. She was held for eight months in Voronezh prison, before being released due to a lack of evidence. Following her release, she moved back to Saint Petersburg, where she qualified to work as a midwife. In 1877, she was again charged with anti-government propaganda and placed under police surveillance. She was tried in the Trial of the 193, during which she was removed from the courtroom for protesting the proceedings; she was ultimately acquitted in January 1878. In Saint Petersburg, she attended meetings chaired by Aleksandra Kornilova, in which they developed the programme for a revolutionary organisation, which would become Narodnaya Volya. In April and May 1878, she travelled through the provinces of Tver, Yaroslavl and Nizhny Novgorod, where she acquainted herself with the local peasant populations.

On 30 July 1878, Alexander Timashev, the Minister of Internal Affairs, ordered her deportation to Vologda province, where she was imprisoned in Solvychegodsk. The following year, she married fellow political prisoner Andriy Frandzholi, with whom she escaped Vologda in February 1880. She managed to get back to Saint Petersburg, where she joined the newly-formed Narodnaya Volya, agitated among workers and students, and managed a safe house for storing explosives. After the assassination of Alexander II of Russia, she went to the Caucasus, where her husband was seeking medical treatment. Together they returned to Moscow, where they established a new revolutionary organisation called the "Christian Brotherhood". After a number of revolutionaries were arrested, including Vera Figner, she moved through Saratov and Kharkiv, before finally fleeing abroad with her husband. They settled in Geneva, where Frandzholi finally succumbed to his tuberculosis. The day he died, on 18 August [O.S. 6 August] 1883, Zavadskaia committed suicide by poisoning.

== Bibliography ==
- Kantor, R.M.; Lyubomirov, P.G.; Shilov, A.A.; Kusheva, E.N., eds. (1934). "Завадская (по мужу Франжоли), Евгения Флориановна" [Zavadskaia (by husband Flandzholi), Evgeniia Florianovna]. Деятели революционного движения в России: Био-библиографический словарь (in Russian). Vol. 3. Society of Former Political Prisoners and Exiled Settlers. pp. 1451–1453. OCLC 749994636.
- Scherbachenko, V.I. (1999). "3аводская Евгения Флориановна" [Zavodskaia Evgeniia Florianovna]. In Ovchinnikov, V.V. (ed.). Белгородская энциклопедия (in Russian). Belgorod Oblast. p. 136. ISBN 5-86295-001-X. OCLC 46388652.
