= Lampland =

Lampland may refer to:

- Carl Otto Lampland (1873–1951), American astronomer
- Lampland (lunar crater)
- Lampland (Martian crater)
- 1767 Lampland, an asteroid
