= Nadezhda Subbotina =

Russian revolutionary (1855–c.1930)

- Надежда Субботина
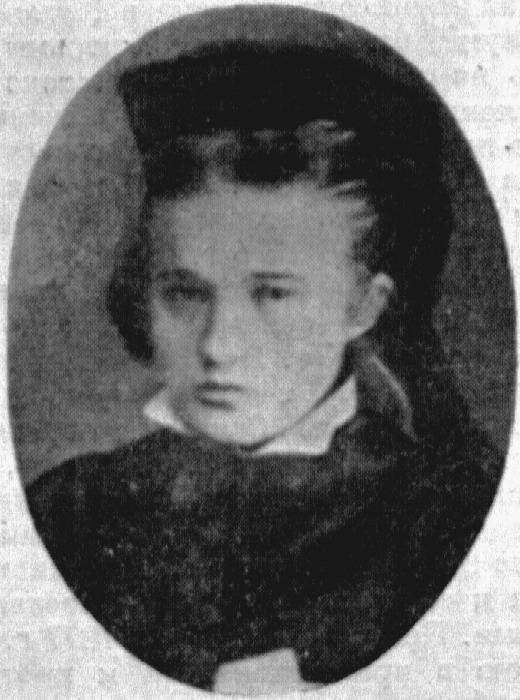
- Subbotina in 1874
- Born: 1855; Podvorgolskoye, Oryol, Russian Empire
- Died: c. 1930 (aged 74–75); Moscow, Soviet Union
- Education: University of Zurich
- Political party: Narodnaya Volya
- Other political affiliations: All-Russian Socialist Revolutionary Organisation
- Movement: Narodniks
- Parents: Dmitrii Subbotin (father); Sofya Subbotina (mother)
- Relatives: Evgeniia and Maria (sisters)

Nadezhda Dmitrievna Subbotina (Russian: Надежда Дмитриевна Субботина; 1855–c. 1930) was a Russian Narodnik revolutionary. Born into a noble family, she went abroad to receive an education in philosophy at the University of Zurich, where she became involved in revolutionary circles. After returning to Russia, she moved through various towns and cities, where she conducted anti-Tsarist propaganda, for which she was arrested and prosecuted first in the Trial of the 193 and then in the Trial of the 50. She was exiled to Tomsk Governorate, where she spent most of the 1880s, before returning to European Russia.

== Biography ==
Nadezhda Dmitrievna Subbotina was born in 1855, in the village of Podvorgolskoye, in the Oryol Governorate of the Russian Empire. She was the youngest daughter of a noble landowner, Dmitrii Subbotin, who died shortly after her birth, leaving his children with a considerable inheritance. The girls' mother, Sofya Subbotina, endeavoured to provide them with the best possible education, enrolling them at a girls' school in Moscow in 1868.

She never formally graduated from school, as in 1873, she travelled abroad with her mother to Switzerland, where she was reunited with her sisters Evgeniia and Maria. She settled in Zurich, where she took classes on philosophy at the University of Zurich, worked on Pyotr Lavrov's magazine Vpered and joined the Fritschi women's circle. In 1874, she returned to Russia, following a summons from the government. She briefly settled in the capital of Saint Petersburg, before returning home to Podvorgolskoye in order to conduct propaganda. As she was surveilled by the police, she decided to move to Oryol, where she joined the revolutionary circle of Pyotr Zaichnevsky.

She subsequently moved to Belomestnoye and then to Tetyushi, where she lived for a while with Lydia Figner, before moving on to Kazan. She was arrested there on 23 September 1874, and prosecuted for anti-government propaganda in the Trial of the 193. She was released, but kept under police surveillance.

While the case was resolved, in the summer of 1875, she moved to Odesa, where she joined another revolutionary circle and helped to smuggle radical literature into the country from abroad. She then moved to Moscow, where she carried out propaganda work for the All-Russian Socialist Revolutionary Organisation. On 7 August 1875, she was arrested and again prosecuted for anti-government propaganda, for which she was held in pre-trial detention in Butyrka prison, where she participated in a prison riot. She was transferred to Saint Petersburg, where, on 30 November 1876, she was charged for anti-government propaganda in the Trial of the 50 and sentenced to exile in Tomsk province. In September 1877, she was transferred to Narym, but as she had fallen ill, she was instead taken to Naimsk. In July 1880, she moved to the city of Tomsk, where she married Stepan Mokievskyy-Zubok. On 7 January 1881, she was arrested after she had been named as a member of Narodnaya Volya. She returned to European Russia in 1889. After the establishment of the Soviet Union, in 1930, she became a member of the Society of Former Political Prisoners and Exiled Settlers.

== Bibliography ==
- Porter, Cathy (1976). Fathers and Daughters: Russian Women in Revolution. London: Virago Press. ISBN 0-704-32802-X. OCLC 2288139.
- Shilov, A. A.; Karnaukhova, M. G., eds. (1932). "Субботина, Надежда Дмитриевна" [Subbotina, Nadezhda Dmitrievna]. Деятели революционного движения в России (in Russian). Vol. 4. Moscow: Society of Former Political Prisoners and Exiled Settlers. pp. 1639–1641. OCLC 749336544.
