= Izmalkovo =

Izmalkovo (Russian: Измалково) is the name of several rural localities in Russia:

- Izmalkovo, Lipetsk Oblast, a selo in Izmalkovsky Selsoviet of Izmalkovsky District of Lipetsk Oblast
- Izmalkovo, Moscow Oblast, a village under the administrative jurisdiction of the City of Odintsovo, Odintsovsky District, Moscow Oblast
- Izmalkovo, Pskov Oblast, a village in Bezhanitsky District of Pskov Oblast
