= Sofya Subbotina =

Russian revolutionary (1830–1919)

- Софья Субботина
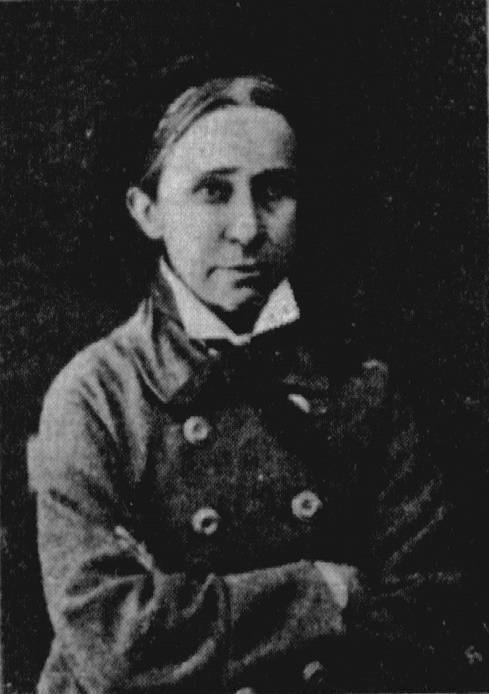
- Born: Sofya Aleksandrovna Iovskaya; 1830; Moscow, Russian Empire
- Died: 15 February 1919 (aged 88–89); Oryol, Russian Soviet Republic
- Organization: Narodnaya Volya
- Movement: Narodniks
- Spouse: Dmitry Subbotin (m. 1852; died 1855)
- Children: Evgeniia, Maria, Nadezhda

Sofya Aleksandrovna Subbotina (née Iovskaya; Russian: Софья Александровна Субботина; 1830–1919) was a Russian Narodnik revolutionary. The mother of Evgeniia, Maria and Nadezhda Subbotina, she went with her daughters to Zurich, where she joined a number of revolutionary circles. When she returned to Russia, she aided the return of fellow revolutionaries Varvara Batyushkova and Evgeniia Zavadskaya, for which she was given up to the Tsarist authorities. She was charged in the Trial of the 193 and sentenced to exile, which she spent in the regions of the Volga, Urals and Siberia, her sentence extended after she was caught financially supporting other political exiles as a member of Narodnaya Volya. Upon her return from exile, she travelled through European Russia, Poland and Ukraine, where she was kept under close surveillance. After the Russian Revolution of 1917, she returned to her home in Oryol, where she died in 1919.

== Biography ==
Sofya Aleksandrovna Iovskaya was born in 1830, in Moscow, the daughter of Aleksandr Iovsky, a professor at the Imperial Moscow University. She grew up and was educated in Moscow. In 1852, she married a landowner, Dmitry Pavlovich Subbotin, with whom she lived on an estate in the village of Podvorgolskoye, in the Oryol province. Sofya herself also owned land in the village of Belomestnoye. Together they had three daughters: Evgeniia, Maria and Nadezhda Subbotina.

Dmitry died shortly after Nadezhda's birth, leaving his children with a considerable inheritance. Sofya endeavoured to provide them with the best possible education, enrolling them at a girls' school in Moscow in 1868. She went abroad with Nadezhda in 1873, settling in Switzerland, where Evgeniia and Maria were attending the University of Zurich. In Zurich, Sofya associated with other Russian emigres, joined a women's circle and attended meetings of the International Workingmen's Association (IWA), before returning to Russia later that year.

She invited revolutionary women, who were living in hiding, to teach at schools where she was a trustee. She brought Varvara Batyushkova to Podvorgolskoye and Evgeniia Zavadskaia to Belomestnoye, where they carried out revolutionary propaganda work among the peasantry. She was denounced to the police by a local official and, on 14 September 1874, she was arrested in Belomestnoye and transferred to a prison in Kursk. When the police searched her property over the subsequent days, they found a lot of revolutionary literature. She was then transferred to Saint Petersburg, where she was held in pre-trial detention in the Peter and Paul Fortress. On 5 May 1877, she was finally charged for anti-Tsarist propaganda in the Trial of the 193. As she refused to answer the court's questions, she was removed from the courtroom and kept out while the trial continued for months. On 23 January 1878, she was found guilty of "uttering hateful words" and sentenced to eight months of imprisonment. The court approved this sentence on 11 May 1878, under the condition that she remain under police surveillance for three years afterwards.

On 19 July 1878, the Minister of Internal Affairs Alexander Timashev ordered that she be deported to the Vyatka Governorate, where she was to be kept under strict surveillance. On 21 November 1878, Timashev's successor Lev Makov granted her permission to move to Kainsk, in the Tomsk Governorate, so she could live with her daughter Nadezhda. She arrived there in March 1879, and in July 1880, she and her daughter moved to Tomsk, where they joined a group that assisted political exiles. In December 1881, she was named on a list of members of Narodnaya Volya; her house was searched, where the authorities found that she had provided money to political exiles. She was arrested on 1 January 1882 and detained until 26 March. She was briefly released before being detained again on 22 July 1882. On 5 October 1883, she was deported to the Yeniseysk Governorate in Siberia for a period of five years, under police surveillance. In 1886, her sentence was extended for two more years. She lived in Minusinsk for the remainder of her exile. She requested to be temporarily allowed to return to Moscow in November 1886, and to move back to Tomsk in March 1887, but her appeals were rejected.

In August 1888, her exile ended and she returned to Oryol, where she was kept under surveillance. She moved to Warsaw in 1891, then to Moscow in 1893, and then to Kyiv in 1897. By 1902, she had settled permanently in Odesa, where she would live for many of the last years of her life, and where she remained under police surveillance. After the February Revolution, in April 1917, she returned to Oryol, where she died on 15 February 1919.

== Bibliography ==
- Porter, Cathy (1976). Fathers and Daughters: Russian Women in Revolution. London: Virago Press. ISBN 0-704-32802-X. OCLC 2288139.
- Shilov, A. A.; Karnaukhova, M. G., eds. (1932). "Субботина, Надежда Дмитриевна" [Subbotina, Sofya Aleksandrovna]. Деятели революционного движения в России (in Russian). Vol. 4. Moscow: Society of Former Political Prisoners and Exiled Settlers. pp. 1641–1643. OCLC 749336544.
