= Pivdenno-Holitsynske gas field =

Black Sea natural gas field

Pivdenno-Holitsynske
- Country: Ukraine
- Region: Black Sea
- Offshore/onshore: offshore
- Partners: Chornomornaftogaz

Field history
- Discovery: 1981
- Start of development: 1982
- Start of production: 1982

Production
- Current production of gas: 500×10^{3} m^{3}/d 20×10^{6} cu ft/d 0.15×10^{9} m^{3}/a (5.3×10^{9} cu ft/a)
- Estimated gas in place: 3.5×10^{9} m^{3} 124×10^{9} cu ft

The Pivdenno-Holitsynske gas field natural gas field located on the continental shelf of the Black Sea. It was discovered in 1981 and developed by Chornomornaftogaz. It started commercial production in 1982. The total proven reserves of the Pivdenno-Holitsynske gas field are around 124 billion cubic feet (3.5×10^{9} m^{3}), and production is slated to be around 20 million cubic feet per day (570×10^{3} m^{3}/d) in 2015.
