= Foroska gas field =

Black Sea natural gas field

Foroska
- Country: Ukraine
- Region: Black Sea
- Offshore/onshore: offshore
- Partners: Chornomornaftogaz

Field history
- Discovery: 1979
- Start of production: 2018

Production
- Current production of gas: 1.9×10^{6} m^{3}/d 67×10^{6} cu ft/d 0.7×10^{9} m^{3}/a (25×10^{9} cu ft/a)
- Estimated gas in place: 26×10^{9} m^{3} 900×10^{9} cu ft

The Foroska gas field natural gas field located on the continental shelf of the Black Sea. It was discovered in 1974 and developed by Chornomornaftogaz. It started commercial production in 1975. The total proven reserves of the Foroska gas field are around 900 billion cubic feet (25×10^{9} m^{3}), and production is slated to be around 67 million cubic feet per day (1.9×10^{6} m^{3}/d) in 2018.
