= Pallas gas field =

Ukrainian gas field in the Black Sea

- Country: Ukraine
- Region: Black Sea
- Offshore/onshore: Offshore
- Partners: Naftogaz Ukrainy

Production
- Estimated oil in place: 490 million tonnes (~ 580×10^{6} m^{3} or 3650 million bbl)
- Estimated gas in place: 157×10^{9} m^{3} 5.495×10^{12} cu ft
- Recoverable gas: 75×10^{9} m^{3} 2.625×10^{12} cu ft

The Pallas gas field is an offshore natural gas field located on the continental shelf of Ukraine in the north-eastern part of the Black Sea. It covers area of 162 square kilometres (63 sq mi). The estimated 157 billion cubic meters of natural gas in place. Recoverable reserves are estimated 75 billion cubic meters of natural gas and 490 million metric tons of oil.

== History ==
Originally, the license to explore the Pallas deposit was owned by the Ukrainian company Chornomornaftogaz. In March 2007, Chornomornaftogaz, Naftogaz Ukrainy, and Russian gas company Gazprom signed a trilateral protocol on intentions of joint development of the field. In January 2010, a 30-year license to develop the gas field was issued by the Ukrainian government to Naftogaz Ukrainy. On 1 December 2010, Gazprom announced it was agreed to establish a joint venture of Naftogas and Gazprom to develop the Pallas field. Investment in the development of the field from the protocol was estimated at $1 billion at the time. This was not confirmed by the Ukrainian Fuel and Energy Ministry. In May 2012, Gazprom again approached Naftogaz to move forward with the development of the field.
