= Shtormove gas field =

Black Sea natural gas field

Shtormove
- Region: Black Sea
- Offshore/onshore: offshore
- Partners: Chornomornaftogaz

Field history
- Discovery: 1983
- Start of development: 1983
- Start of production: 1983

Production
- Current production of gas: 1,000×10^{3} m^{3}/d 40×10^{6} cu ft/d 0.3×10^{9} m^{3}/a (11×10^{9} cu ft/a)
- Estimated gas in place: 16.5×10^{9} m^{3} 583×10^{9} cu ft

The Shtormove gas field natural gas field located on the continental shelf of the Black Sea. It was discovered in 1974 and developed by Chornomornaftogaz. It started commercial production in 1983. The total proven reserves of the Shtormove gas field are around 583 billion cubic feet (16.5×10^{9} m^{3}), and production is slated to be around 40 million cubic feet per day (1.1×10^{6} m^{3}/d) in 2015.

Russia seized the field from Ukraine when it took over Crimea in 2014. The Russian jack-up rig, Tavrida, was subsequently attacked and taken by Ukrainian forces in 2022.

== History ==
Chornomornaftogaz first started pilot operations for the production of the field in 1993. In August 2004, the Cabinet of Ministers of Ukraine introduced the field into full commercial development following the completion of an industrial development phase of it. By 2010, the field's main production was done at the Marine Stationary Platform MSP-17, which had 16 wells, and the field was producing over 2.1 million cubic metres of gas per day. In August 2012, the jack-up drilling rig Tavrida started conducting additional drilling at the field, although it was planned that in late 2012 Tavrida would be transferred to Bezimenne gas field.

Following the 2014 Russian annexation of Crimea, Chornomornaftogaz and its assets - including the field - were seized by Russian forces. Shtormove continued to be operated under the now Russian-backed Chornomornaftogaz under guard by Russian special operations forces. In April 2017, the Ukrainian State Service for Geology suspended Chornomornaftogaz's license for the field de jure over unpaid royalty debts, although it was still de facto controlled by Russia. In addition to drilling at the platform, following the Russian annexation, military surveillance equipment was installed at the field.

The Tavrida jack-up rig, which was stationed at Shtormove gas field, was struck by Ukrainian Armed Forces following the start of the Russian invasion of Ukraine through missiles in June 2022, which damaged its helipad. Later, in August 2024, Ukrainian forces again struck the MSP-17 at the field using a Sea Baby, with the Ukrainian Navy spokesperson, Dmytro Pletenchuk, later confirming the attack, claiming that Russia had used the platform for GPS spoofing, which harmed civilian shipping.
