= Alexander Pribylev =

Alexander Vasilievich Pribylev
- Александр Васильевич Прибылёв
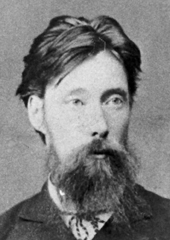

Personal details
- Born: 30 August 1857 Kamyshlov, Kamyshlovsky Uyezd, Perm Governorate, Russian Empire
- Died: 30 August 1936 (aged 79) Leningrad, Russian Socialist Federative Soviet Republic, Soviet Union
- Party: People's Will, Party of Socialist Revolutionaries
- Education: Medical and Surgical Academy
- Occupation: Professional revolutionary, bacteriologist
- Known for: Populism, democratic socialism, Orthodox Christianity

Alexander Vasilievich Pribylev (1857–1936) was a Russian revolutionary, member of the party Narodnaya Volya, member of the Party of Socialist Revolutionaries, a bacteriologist and later a Soviet public figure.

== Biography ==
Born in the family of archpriest of the only city Orthodox Cathedral Vasily Pribylev and his wife from the Polish family of Zholkevsky. The family had seven children. The mother died early, and the father and eldest daughter were engaged in raising the youngest children.

After graduating from the city gymnasium, he entered the Veterinary Institute in Kazan. After finishing the first year of the institute, he transferred to the Petrovsko-Razumovskaya (Agricultural) Academy in Moscow. By his own will he moved to Saint Petersburg and due to the fact that the one-year term of leaving the Kazan Veterinary Institute had not yet expired, he was enrolled as a student at the Medical and Surgical Academy in the Veterinary Department, and he studied medicine in parallel with veterinary medicine. Became close to the Narodnaya Volya. In 1880, he became part of Narodnaya Volya, conducted propaganda among students, raised funds for the party, and participated in the preparation of an attempt on the assassination of the gendarme Georgy Sudeikin.

In 1882, as a 5th year student at the Medical and Surgical Academy, he was arrested, participated in the Process of Seventeen, convicted, deprived of all state rights and exiled to hard labor in mines for 15 years. He served his penal servitude with his wife, also a member of Narodnaya Volya, who was convicted in the Process of Seventeen, Raisa Lvovna Pribyleva (Rosalia Lvovna Grosman, 1858–1900). Placed in the Lower Carian prison. Having a good library, he continued his medical education. He survived the Carian tragedy, participated in protests, hunger strikes. He provided medical assistance to prisoners.

In 1891, he was sent to a settlement in the village of Ust-Ilinskoye. In the spring of 1893, he left for the Ilensky gold mines. After the dissolution of the marriage with Raisa Lvovna Pribyleva married Anna Pavlovna Korba. In the first half of 1896, he was included in the medical community of Chita. In November 1897, he and his wife left for Blagoveshchensk, where he got a job at the Amur Shipping Company Partnership. As an agent of the partnership, he worked in the village of Sretensk, Transbaikal Region.

In 1904, he received a certificate of election of a free residence with the exception of capitals and capital provinces. At the end of August 1904, he went to Yekaterinburg, later to Odessa. At the end of 1904, he joined the Party of Socialist Revolutionaries, became a member of the Central Bureau and representative of the center at the regional and local party committees.

Moved to Moscow. In 1909, he was arrested and administratively deported to the Yenisei Governorate for 5 years. Settled in Minusinsk. In the summer of 1911, he emigrated abroad, where he lived for 3 years, received the title of a bacteriologist.

In 1914, he returned to Russia, arrived in the Yenisei Governorate to end the term of exile, settled in the village of Kazachinskoe, then in Krasnoyarsk. In 1916, he returned to European Russia. After several months as a bacteriologist in the Zemsky Union on the Western Front, he worked in Petrograd at a private bacteriological institute.

After the February Revolution of 1917, in the government of Alexander Kerensky, he held the post of director of the office in the Ministry of Agriculture (Minister Viktor Chernov).

After the October Revolution, he settled in Yekaterinburg, worked as the head of the sanitary bacteriological city laboratory.

On 13 August 1918 he was appointed manager of agriculture and state property in the Provisional Regional Government of the Urals from the Socialist Revolutionary Party. The entire system of Omsk legislation was extended to the territory of the Ural government; Siberian banknotes received the right of free circulation in the Urals, and all armed groups in the territory of the Ural government were subordinate to the command of the Siberian Army. Therefore, the coup d'état of Admiral Kolchak in Omsk led to the liquidation of the interim government of the Urals and the return of Pribylev to the activities of a bacteriologist.

Member of the Society of Former Political Prisoners and Exiled Settlers. He tried to actively assist those who were repressed by the Soviet government.

Two weeks before his death, already a seriously ill, bedridden old man, Pribylev underwent an attempt to be arrested by the employees of the People's Commissariat of Internal Affairs. However, the wife Anna Pavlovna, also a former convict, lay on the floor at the front door and told the one who presented her with a warrant for her husband's arrest: "Only through my corpse!". The commander could not stand it, left and took the convoy.

He died on 30 August 1936 in Leningrad. He was buried at Volkovsky Cemetery.

== Works ==
- Notes of the Member of the People's Will – Moscow: Politkatorzhan Publishing House, 1930 – 306 Pages

== Family ==
- Raisa Lvovna Pribyleva (née Rosalia Grossman) – from 1881 to 1893 (official marriage);
- Anna Pavlovna Pribyleva-Korba – from 1894 until the death of Alexander Vasilyevich in August 1936.

There were no native children in both marriages.

Alexander Vasilyevich Pribylev and Anna Pavlovna Pribyleva-Korba, being in exile in Blagoveshchensk in 1897–1901, adopted the girl Asya, an orphan of deceased exiled, who was brought up as their own daughter.

== Address in Leningrad ==
- Leningrad (now Saint Petersburg), Revolution Square (now Trinity Square), building 1.
