= 1604 Tombaugh =

Type Eos asteroid

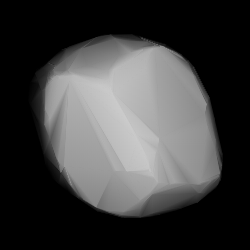
- Shape model of Tombaugh from its lightcurve

Discovery
- Discovered by: C. O. Lampland
- Discovery site: Lowell Obs.
- Discovery date: 24 March 1931

Designations
- Named after: Clyde Tombaugh (astronomer)
- Alternative designations: 1931 FH · 1930 DX; 1933 SA_{1} · 1936 FA; 1937 JH · 1941 CF; 1943 OE · 1948 ME; 1949 ST_{1} · A920 EC
- Minor planet category: main-belt · Eos

Orbital characteristics
- Epoch 4 September 2017 (JD 2458000.5)
- Uncertainty parameter 0
- Observation arc: 96.51 yr (35,252 days)
- Aphelion: 3.3309 AU
- Perihelion: 2.7161 AU
- Semi-major axis: 3.0235 AU
- Eccentricity: 0.1017
- Orbital period (sidereal): 5.26 yr (1,920 days)
- Mean anomaly: 359.39°
- Mean motion: 0° 11^{m} 15^{s} / day
- Inclination: 9.3941°
- Longitude of ascending node: 309.10°
- Argument of perihelion: 38.199°

Physical characteristics
- Dimensions: 28.78±0.53 km 32.25 km (derived); 32.33±2.2 km (IRAS:3)
- Synodic rotation period: 6.15 h (dated); 7.04 h (dated); 7.047±0.004 h 7.056±0.001 h 8.2 h (dated)
- Geometric albedo: 0.0933 (derived); 0.1038±0.016 (IRAS:3); 0.138±0.006
- Spectral type: B–V = 0.751; U–B = 0.373; XSCU (Tholen) · Xc (SMASS) · X
- Absolute magnitude (H): 10.4 · 10.53 · 10.65 · 10.93±0.15

1604 Tombaugh, provisional designation 1931 FH, is a rare-type Eos asteroid from the outer region of the asteroid belt, approximately 32 kilometers in diameter. It was discovered on 24 March 1931, by American astronomer Carl Otto Lampland at Lowell Observatory in Flagstaff, Arizona, in the United States. It was named after the discoverer of Pluto, Clyde Tombaugh.

== Classification and orbit ==
Tombaugh is a member of the Eos family that orbits the Sun in the outer main-belt at a distance of 2.7–3.3 AU once every 5 years and 3 months (1,920 days). Its orbit has an eccentricity of 0.10 and an inclination of 9° with respect to the ecliptic. Its observation arc begins at Flagstaff, one year prior to its official discovery observation at Lowell Observatory. It had been previously identified at Heidelberg as A920 EC in 1920, and as 1930 DX in 1930.

== Physical characteristics ==
Tombaugh is classified as an X-type asteroid. It is also classified as a rare XSCU type in the Tholen, and as a transitional Xc type in the SMASS taxonomy.

=== Rotation period ===
In April 2010 and November 2012, rotational lightcurves of Tombaugh were obtained from photometric observations at Oakley Southern Sky Observatory, Australia, and at Bassano Bresciano Observatory, Italy. Lightcurve analysis gave a rotation period of 7.047 and 7.056 hours with a brightness variation of 0.16 and 0.35 magnitude, respectively (U=2+/2+).

These periods supersede previous results obtained by astronomers Claes-Ingvar Lagerkvist (1975), Richard P. Binzel (1984) and Krisztián Sárneczky (U=1/2/2).

=== Diameter and albedo ===
According to the surveys carried out by the Infrared Astronomical Satellite IRAS and the Japanese Akari satellite, Tombaugh measures 28.78 and 32.33 kilometers in diameter, and its surface has an albedo of 0.138 and 0.104, respectively. The Collaborative Asteroid Lightcurve Link derives an albedo of 0.0933 and a diameter of 32.25 kilometers with an absolute magnitude of 10.65.

== Naming ==
This minor planet was named for American astronomer Clyde Tombaugh (1906–1997), famous for his discovery of Pluto in 1930. The discovering Lowell Observatory named this asteroid on the occasion of a symposium on Pluto, held in 1980. When Tombaugh examined the photographic plates during the trans-Saturnian search program at the Lowell Observatory, he also marked over 4,000 minor planets on these plates. The approved naming citation was published by the Minor Planet Center on 1 April 1980 (M.P.C. 5280).
