= Provisional Regional Government of the Urals =

Anti-Bolshevik provisional government

Provisional Regional Government of the Urals Временное областное правительство Урала (Russian)
- 1918
- Flag of the Provisional Ural Government

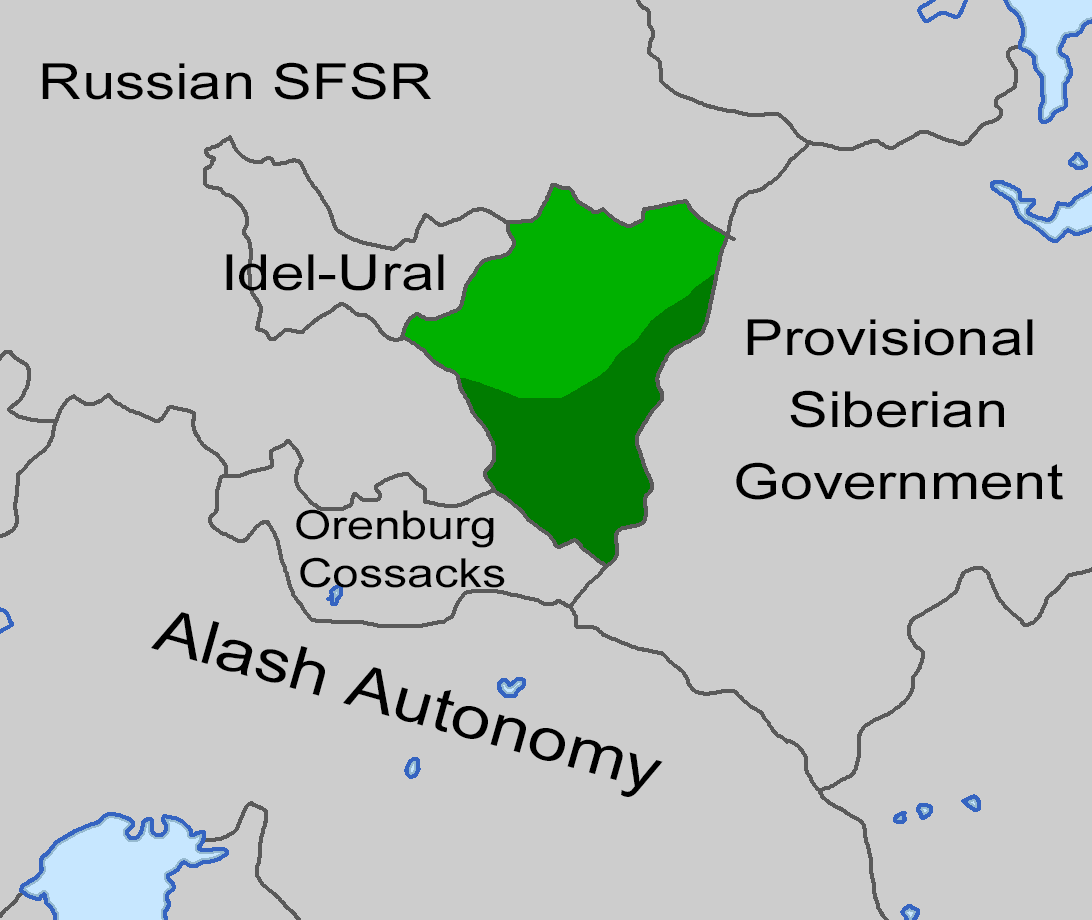
- Controlled territory in dark green, claimed in light green.
- Status: Provisional government
- Capital: Ekaterinburg
- Chairman of the Council
  - 1918: Pavel Ivanov
- History
  - Established: August 19, 1918
  - Disestablished: October 26, 1918
Preceded by	Succeeded by
Committee of Members of the Constituent Assembly; Provisional Siberian Government (Omsk)	Russian State

The Provisional Regional Government of the Urals (Russian: Временное областное правительство Урала) was an anti-Bolshevik provisional government, created in Yekaterinburg on August 19, 1918, which controlled the Perm Governorate, parts of the Vyatka, Ufa, and Orenburg Governorates. It was abolished in October 1918.

== Creation and dissolution ==
In 1918, a struggle was fought between the Committee of Members of the Constituent Assembly and the Provisional Siberian Government for control of the Urals. As a buffer zone between them, to establish stable real power, after the occupation of Yekaterinburg by Czechoslovaks by a commission representing members of various parties, at a meeting on August 19, 1918, in Yekaterinburg, the Provisional Regional Government of the Urals was created. The Provisional Regional Government of the Urals was supposed to operate until the convocation of the Ural Regional Duma or the All-Russian Constituent Assembly.

On October 26, 1918, the Provisional Ural Government decided to resign and transfer all power in the Urals to the Provisional All-Russian Government ("Omsk Directory"), which on November 10 accepted the resignation of the Provisional Regional Government of the Urals.

== Composition ==
The main organs of government were the Council of the Provisional Regional Government of the Urals and 8 main departments, among which there were no such main departments as, for example, the military, communications, and foreign affairs. These issues were decided by other chief managers (for example, external relations, including with other white governments in Russia on the formation of all-Russian authorities, were assigned to the competence of the Comrade Chairman of the Provisional Regional Government of the Urals, Lev Krol, and his direct duties as chief financial officer were performed by his Comrade Menshevik Vsevolod Vsevolozhsky). As part of the government, the institution of special commissioners functioned to convey the principles of its policy to the population of the Urals.

Position	Person	Party Affiliation
Chairman of the Council	Pavel Ivanov	Constitutional Democrat
Chief Manager of Trade and Industry	Pavel Ivanov	Constitutional Democrat
Comrade chairman	Lev Krol	Constitutional Democrat
Chief Manager of Finance	Lev Krol	Constitutional Democrat
Chief Manager of Agriculture and State Property	Alexander Pribylev	Socialist Revolutionary
Chief Manager of Education	Vladimir Anastasiev	Socialist Revolutionary
Chief Manager of Internal Affairs	Nikolay Aseikin	People's Socialist
Chief Manager of Labor	Pyotr Murashev	Menshevik
Chief Manager of Justice	Nikolay Glasson	Non-Partisan
Chief Manager of Mining	Anton Gutt	Non-Partisan

== Politics ==
The declaration of the Provisional Ural Government of August 27, 1918, declared a program containing, inter alia, the following main provisions:

- Preservation of democratic freedoms;
- Equality of all religions and nations, the right to their cultural self-determination; condemnation of the Bolshevik decree on separation of church and state;
- Promoting the development of industry in the Urals, restoration of private property rights and entrepreneurship in industry, trade and banking;
- The return of plants to their former owners; nationalization of individual enterprises in case of state necessity;
- Saving an eight-hour working day and the existing social insurance system; the establishment of wages by mutual agreement of employers and workers, but no less than a fixed subsistence level;
- Preservation of land in the hands of its actual users until the Constituent Assembly finally resolves the issue;
- Assistance to the White Army;
- The resumption of local government; restoration of rights and relations prohibited by Bolshevik decrees.

In a number of modern studies, the actions undertaken by the Provisional Government of the Urals in extremely difficult conditions with an almost complete lack of necessary resources and the most difficult internal political situation are rated very highly. So, according to Pavel Kostogryzov, the socio-economic policy of the Ural government, which can be described as a policy of conscious and consistent class compromise, "...was quite reasonable and helped normalize the economic life of the region". He sees the main merit of the government in that "...the economic situation of the Urals was more stable and better than the territories controlled by the Reds".

However, towards the end of its existence, the Provisional Regional Government of the Urals began to move away from democratic ideas in its policy.

During its existence, the Ural government, among other things, also paid 254,000 rubles for the maintenance of the "white" police and issued 81 legislative acts. The most famous of them:

- On obligatory delivery of all mined platinum exclusively to the treasury;
- About the institute of special direct tax collectors under tax inspectors;
- On state regulation of trade;
- On setting marginal prices for bread and metals.

The implementation of some provisions of the program, especially in the social sphere, was extremely difficult due to lack of funding, so the Provisional Regional Government of the Urals was forced to seek help from the Committee of Members of the Constituent Assembly and the Siberian Government, which actively used these requests as an excuse to intervene in the region. The government did not have its own military units, so it was not able to withstand the pressure on it from the military authorities and entrepreneurs supporting the policies of the Provisional Siberian Government. The Provisional Regional Government of the Urals saw a way out of this situation in the formation of a single centralized power in Russia.

Omsk was liberated earlier than Yekaterinburg purely by accident. This made it possible to form the Siberian government in Omsk, and not in Yekaterinburg... There is no doubt that the Ural government was stronger than Omsk. Who knows, perhaps the results of the White revolt would have been completely different if the power belonged to those who entered the Urals government.
