= Prykerchenske field =

Offshore Ukrainian oil field in the Black Sea

Prykerchenske
- Country: Ukraine
- Region: Black Sea
- Offshore/onshore: offshore

Production
- Estimated oil in place: 83 million tonnes (~ 96.7×10^{6} m^{3} or 608 million bbl)
- Estimated gas in place: 180×10^{9} m^{3} 6.3×10^{12} cu ft

The Prykerchenske field is a Ukrainian oil field located on the continental shelf of the Black Sea. It will begin production in 2015 and will produce oil and natural gas. The total proven reserves of the Prykerchensky oil field are around 608 million barrels (96,700,000 m^{3}), and production will be centered on 50,000 barrels per day (7,900 m^{3}/d).

== History ==
In April 2006, the American company Vanco Energy won the tender to develop the Prykerchenske field. The production sharing agreement (PSA) between Vanco and the Ukrainian government was signed in October 2007, and thereafter, the rights to the field were transferred to Vanco's new subsidiary for the field, Vanco Prykerchenska. In April 2008, however, then Prime Minister Yulia Tymoshenko argued to the Cabinet of Ministers that the PSA needed to be revised and that it was not made in the best interests of Ukraine. Subsequently, the Ministry of Environmental Protection terminated Vanco's license in May 2008, to which the company confirmed it would seek arbitration. Tymoshenko had objected for two reasons. First, when the tender was being signed under the Yuriy Yekhanurov government, there were already over 200 objections to the proposal because of the share of extracted hydrocarbons mostly not going to Ukraine. Second, because Vanco had at the time planned to involve Eastern Investment Ltd (a company of Nathaniel Rothschild), which would've required a complex profit-sharing agreement.

At the same time, during the time the tender was signed and before the PSA was signed, the government was trying to involve Naftogaz and Gazprom in the deal in order to develop the field further. However, in April 2007, the then deputy chairman of Gazprom, Valery Golubev, said the company had no intention of doing this because the field was not that big. Chornomornaftogaz also rejected joining the project, as they were focused on deepwater and did not want to do it in close proximity to Russia. After Viktor Yanukovych became President of Ukraine, in April 2011 the PSA was re-signed with Vanco. Under this new PSA, Ukraine would obtain 70% of the output of the field.

Following the 2014 Russian annexation of Crimea, Russia seized the Prykerchenske field, which they announced they planned to restructure. Subsequently, Naftogaz filed claims against Russia, claiming they were seized assets and that the fields - including Prykerchenske - were in Ukraine's international territorial waters.
