= Olga Lyubatovich =

Russian revolutionary (1854–1917)

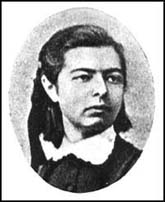
- Born: 1854; Russia
- Died: 1917; Tbilisi, Russian Republic

Olga Spiridonovna Lyubatovich (Russian: Ольга Спиридоновна Любатович; 1854–1917) was a Russian revolutionary and member of Narodnaya Volya.

== Biography ==
=== Early life ===
Lyubatovich was the daughter of an engineer and a political refugee from Montenegro, born in 1854. Her maternal grandfather owned a goldmine, and her mother, who died when Olga was in her teens, had "a level of culture rare for those times: she had studied in the best French boarding school in Moscow and spent time in the company of writers.". She wanted to study medicine in order to become a doctor, which was impossible for a woman to do in Russia. For this reason she went to study in Zürich with Sophia Bardina, her sister Vera in 1871.

=== Revolutionary life ===
In Zurich, both Lyubatovich sisters joined the 'Fritsche circle', a group of nine or ten young feminists whose leading figures were Sophia Bardina and Vera Figner. They joined a group of Georgian students to form the 'Pan- Russian Social Revolutionary Organisation'. In 1875, she returned to Russia and took jobs as an unskilled factory hand in Moscow and, later, Tula in an attempt to recruit workers to the socialist movement. In Tula, the girlfriend of one of the workers she contacted suspected they had become lovers, and denounced her to the police. A defendant at the 'Trial of the 50', along with her sister, Bardina, Pyotr Alexeyev and others, she was sentenced to nine years hard labour after nearly two years in prison. However, this sentence was later reduced to banishment to Siberia. In Tobolsk, she married one of her co-defendants, Ivan Dzhabadari and was able to employ her medical knowledge to help the local people, where she became known as the "miracle worker".

She escaped from Siberia in July 1878, with help from a peasant whom she converted to socialism, by leaving a suicide note and leaving some of her clothes by the banks of a river.

In St Petersburg, she joined Sergey Kravchinsky and Nikolai Morozov as co-editors of the illegal publication Zemlya i Volya (Land and Liberty), but having no legal status had to change address constantly. After a short time, she escaped abroad, with the help of Jewish smugglers, to Geneva, where she stayed for about six months. In spring 1879, she and Yakov Stefanovich returned to Russia, just as Zemlya i Volnya split into two factions, over the tactical question of whether to assassinate Tsar Alexander II. She joined Narodnaya Volya (People's Will), but played no direct role in the attempts to kill the Tsar.

=== Defeat and Arrest ===
In 1880, there was internal dispute within Narodnaya Volya. One side believing that terrorism's objective should be to force the government into granting democratic rights to the people, while others led by Lev Tikhomirov who was influenced by Sergei Nechayev argued that it was possible for terrorism to be used for a small group or revolutionaries to snatch power and then hand it over to the people. Lyubatovich and Morozov - who had become lovers - countered that this was an example of Jacobinism and would thus result in the kind of dictatorship that had taken place after the French Revolution. In her memoirs, Lyubatovich accused Tikhomirov of using underhand methods to get his version of the party programme adopted in preference to Morozov's, and that in doing so "disfigured one of the most brilliant periods of the revolutionary struggle."

In 1880, she and Morozov left Narodnaya Volya and emigrated to Berlin and then Geneva. While in exile Morozov wrote The Terrorist Struggle, a pamphlet that explained his views and how to achieve a democratic society in Russia. He returned to Russia in order to distribute The Terrorist Struggle but was almost immediately arrested. Lyubatovich, despite just having gone through child birth, decided to attempt to rescue him. While she was in St Petersburg, she received a message from Kravchinsky telling her that her daughter had died, at six months, during a meningitis epidemic. Then she too was arrested, and deported to Siberia in November 1882.

=== Personality ===
A Swiss woman left a vivid description of the teenage Lyubatovish in Zurich:

Behind the table was sitting an enigmatic being, whose biological character was at first all but clear to me: a roundish, boyish face, short-cut hair, parted askew, enormous blue glasses, a quite youthful, tender-coloured face, a coarse jacket, a burning cigarette in its mouth - everything about it was boylike, and yet there was something which belied this desired impression. I looked stealthily under the table - and discovered a bright-coloured, somewhat faded cotton skirt. The being took no notice at all of my presence and remained absorbed in a large book, every now and then rolling a cigarette which was finished in a few draughts. Then my acquaintance arrived, and it appeared that the phenomenon was a 17 year old Russian girl from Moscow, Miss Lyubatovich, which fact she confirmed with a short nod.

=== Death and legacy ===
Olga Lyubatovich was released following the 1905 Revolution, as part of a political amnesty. After her return to St. Petersburg she wrote her memoirs. She died in 1917.
