= Odeske gas field =

Black Sea natural gas field

Odeske
- Location of Odeske in the Black Sea
- Country: Ukraine
- Region: Black Sea
- Offshore/onshore: offshore
- Coordinates: 45.2000°N 30.9833°E
- Partners: Chornomornaftogaz; China National Offshore Oil Corporation

Field history
- Discovery: 1975
- Start of development: 2012
- Start of production: 5 September 2012

Production
- Current production of gas: 3×10^{6} m^{3}/d 105×10^{6} cu ft/d 1×10^{9} m^{3}/a (35×10^{9} cu ft/a)
- Estimated gas in place: 21×10^{9} m^{3} 746×10^{9} cu ft

The Odeske gas field natural gas field located on the continental shelf of the Black Sea. The total proven reserves of the Odesa gas field are around 746 billion cubic feet (21.1×10^{9} m^{3}), and production is slated to be around 35 million cubic feet per day (990×10^{3} m^{3}/d) in 2015. The field is located in the central part of the northwestern Black Sea shelf, approximately 130 kilometres from Odesa and 150 kilometres from Crimea. The productive layers are found at depths from 640 to 1,630 metres, with the gas composition being 96 to 98% methane.

Starting in 2002, a planned project was initiated to massively develop the field. The project officially started preparation in 2007, and it was planned to be developed by Chornomornaftogaz in cooperation with the China National Offshore Oil Corporation. In May 2012 the project officially began, and commercial production was launched on 5 September 2012. Following the 2014 Russian annexation of Crimea, Russia seized Chornomornaftogaz's drilling infrastructure, including that in Odeske, and began the illegal exploitation of the field, despite it lying within Ukraine's exclusive economic zone. Ukraine subsequently initiated arbitration proceedings against Russia at the Permanent Court of Arbitration in 2016 over the case.

== History ==
The field was first identified in 1975, with exploratory drilling beginning in 1984 and the field was opened in 1988 for full drilling. Following the collapse of the Soviet Union, the field became part of the exclusive economic zone of the now independent Ukraine. In June 2002, the owner Chornomornaftogaz announced an investment project for the field's development, proposing that there could be a joint venture with foreign investors. The total project cost was estimated at approximately $100 million USD. Later, in August 2007, Naftogaz proposed that UkrGaz-Energo could also help participate in the field's development through a joint venture with Chornomornaftogaz, after its subsidiary Ukrgazvydobuvannya had been removed from the planned project. From 2007 to 2012, with the help of the government, the field was being prepared for the project. In 2009, it was announced that the China National Offshore Oil Corporation would join the project as a foreign investor.

In May 2012, the floating drilling rig Petro Hodovanets arrived at the field to begin drilling and to formally start the project. The plan at the time was for six wells to be drilled by the end of 2012, with more plans for 30 sea platforms and block-conductors and over 300 kilometres of underwater pipelines. Commercial production for the project was formally launched on 5 September 2012 by then-President Viktor Yanukovych. By 2012, most of the gas from the field was flowing to Crimea. Prior to 2014, seven wells had been drilled at the field as part of the project, with approximately 500 million cubic metres having been extracted.

Following the 2014 Russian annexation of Crimea, Russia seized control of the company Chornomornaftogaz and its physical equipment, which were operating at the field. Using this, they began illegal exploitation of the field, despite it being in Ukrainian international waters. An additional 11 wells were drilled after this, and by February 2018 Russia had illegally extracted over 3.5 billion cubic metres of gas from the field and it was providing nearly 50% of the total gas production for Crimea. In September 2016, an international arbitration case was initiated by Ukraine against Russia at the Permanent Court of Arbitration relating to the case. Ukraine claimed that the use of Chornomornaftogaz's illegally acquired infrastructure in the international waters of Ukraine was illegal under the United Nations Convention on the Law of the Sea. Following this, in 2017 the now Russian-backed company of Chornomornaftogaz confirmed they would stop operating their facilities in the field, and other fields around Odesa, starting on 1 July 2018 despite the case not having been settled because of the recommendation of the Russian Ministry of Foreign Affairs which considered the Russian claim legally vulnerable since Odeske is closer to Odesa than Crimea.

However, by 2018, it was confirmed that despite these statements, Russia had not actually stopped production from the field. The order was cancelled by the Crimean Ministry of Fuel and Energy after a new director, Alexander Kuznetsov, was appointed, as the local authorities of occupied Crimea and the federal government had failed to agree on the issue. However, Russia did abandon plans to drill two further wells at the field, and production was expected to continue declining because neither the federal government or the Crimean authorities had not announced further development plans.
