= Holitsynske gas field =

Black Sea natural gas field

Holitsynske
- Location of Holitsynske gas field in Black Sea
- Region: Black Sea
- Offshore/onshore: offshore
- Coordinates: 45°43′23″N 31°50′16″E
- Partners: Chornomornaftogaz

Field history
- Discovery: 1974
- Start of development: 1975
- Start of production: 1975

Production
- Current production of gas: 500×10^{3} m^{3}/d 20×10^{6} cu ft/d 0.15×10^{9} m^{3}/a (5.3×10^{9} cu ft/a)
- Estimated gas in place: 15.4×10^{9} m^{3} 544×10^{9} cu ft

The Holitsynske gas field (Ukrainian: Голіцинське газоконденсатне родовище) natural gas field located on the continental shelf of the Black Sea. It was discovered in 1974 and developed by Chornomornaftogaz. It started commercial production in 1975. The total proven reserves of the Holitsynske gas field are around 544 billion cubic feet (15.4×10^{9} m^{3}), and production is slated to be around 20 million cubic feet per day (570×10^{3} m^{3}/d) in 2015.

== History ==
In 1974, Holitsynske was the first gas field discovered on the Black Sea shelf, and in 1975 the first commercial production began. More commercial development began starting in 1983.

In May 2011, Chornomornaftogaz launched extraction from two newly drilled wells at the block-conductor BK-11, which is located on the field, which was connected through what was also a newly laid underwater pipeline. Additionally, wells at the BK-11 were planned for completion. The redevelopment was carried out in cooperation with a government programme that was initiated to boost domestic gas production with additional financial support provided by Naftogaz.

Following the highly disputed 2014 Russian annexation of Crimea, it has been alleged that Russia deployed drilling infrastructure to the field and conducted extraction activity there under the Russian flag, which is considered illegal. In December 2015, a State Border Guard Service of Ukraine service vessel approached the Russian-flagged drilling platform Tavrida which was operating on the field and demanded the purpose of the platform, which was ignored, and subsequently Russia dispatched the patrol ship Ametyst to the area where two Ukrainian naval vessels intercepted it. In September 2016, a Ukrainian border guard vessel completed an assigned mission of finding evidence of illegal Russian drilling at the field.
