= Subota =

Subota or Subbota (Cyrillic: Субота or Суббота) means Saturday in several Slavic languages. It may refer to

- Lazareva Subota, a Serbian Orthodox tradition
- Subota Jović, 17th century Habsburg military officer of Serbian origin
- Aliaksandr Subota (born 1984), Paralympian athlete from Belarus
- Minja Subota (1938-2021), Serbian composer, musician, entertainer and photographer

== See also ==
- Subbotin
- Subbotnik
