= Milan Subotin =

Serbian politician

Milan Subotin (Serbian Cyrillic: Милан Суботин; born 1984) is a politician in Serbia. He has served in the Assembly of Vojvodina since 2020 as a member of the Serbian Progressive Party.

== Private career ==
Subotin has a master's degree in traffic engineering. He lives in Novi Sad.

== Politician ==
Subotin received the forty-fifth position on the Progressive Party's Aleksandar Vučić — For Our Children electoral list in the 2020 provincial election and was elected when the list won a majority victory with seventy-six out of 120 mandates. In October 2020, he was selected as chair of the assembly committee on culture and public information. He is also a member of the committee on national equality.
