= 1692 Subbotina =

Asteroid

Discovery
- Discovered by: G. Neujmin
- Discovery site: Simeiz Obs.
- Discovery date: 16 August 1936

Designations
- Named after: Mikhail Subbotin (Soviet scientist)
- Alternative designations: 1936 QD · 1927 SL; 1930 FG · 1931 OA; 1935 GJ · 1935 JJ; 1940 LK · 1941 SO_{1} 1941 UA · 1949 HL_{1} 1950 RZ · 1951 YM_{1} 1955 SO_{2} · 1964 RC
- Minor planet category: main-belt · (middle) background

Orbital characteristics
- Epoch 27 April 2019 (JD 2458600.5)
- Uncertainty parameter 0
- Observation arc: 88.24 yr (32,228 d)
- Aphelion: 3.1731 AU
- Perihelion: 2.4012 AU
- Semi-major axis: 2.7871 AU
- Eccentricity: 0.1385
- Orbital period (sidereal): 4.65 yr (1,700 d)
- Mean anomaly: 289.80°
- Mean motion: 0° 12^{m} 42.48^{s} / day
- Inclination: 2.4273°
- Longitude of ascending node: 199.66°
- Argument of perihelion: 111.88°

Physical characteristics
- Mean diameter: 36.075±0.380 km 36.59±1.7 km 38.11±0.53 km
- Synodic rotation period: 9.2457±0.0005 h
- Geometric albedo: 0.045; 0.0479; 0.049
- Spectral type: SMASS = Cg
- Absolute magnitude (H): 11.10; 11.20; 11.3; 11.48

1692 Subbotina, provisional designation 1936 QD, is a dark background asteroid from the central region of the asteroid belt, approximately 37 kilometers (23 miles) in diameter. The carbonaceous Cg-type asteroid has a rotation period of 9.2 hours. It was discovered by Grigory Neujmin at the Crimean Simeiz Observatory in 1936, and later named after Soviet mathematician and astronomer Mikhail Subbotin.

== Discovery ==
Subbotina was discovered by Soviet-Russian astronomer Grigory Neujmin at the Crimean Simeiz Observatory on 16 August 1936. On the following night, astronomer Karl Reinmuth independently discovered the body at the Heidelberg Observatory in Germany. The asteroid was first observed as 1927 SL at the discovering observatory in September 1927. Its first used observation was made at Heidelberg in July 1931, extending the body's observation arc by 5 years prior to its official discovery observation in 1936.

== Naming ==
This minor planet was named in memory of eminent Soviet mathematician and astronomer, Mikhail Subbotin (1893–1966), long-time director of the Institute of Theoretical Astronomy (ITA) in former Leningrad. The lunar crater Subbotin was also named in his honour. The official naming citation was published by the Minor Planet Center on 1 June 1967 (M.P.C. 2740).

== Orbit and classification ==
Subbotina is a non-family asteroid from the main belt's background population. It orbits the Sun in the central asteroid belt at a distance of 2.4–3.2 AU once every 4 years and 8 months (1,700 days; semi-major axis of 2.79 AU). Its orbit has an eccentricity of 0.14 and an inclination of 2° with respect to the ecliptic.

== Physical characteristics ==
In the SMASS-II taxonomy, Subbotina has been characterized as a dark Cg-type, a subtype of the wider group of carbonaceous C-type asteroids with low albedos.

=== Rotation period ===
In October 2006, a rotational lightcurve of Subbotina was obtained from photometric observations by Italian Silvano Casulli and French Laurent Bernasconi, both amateur astronomers. Lightcurve analysis gave a well-defined rotation period of 9.2457±0.0005 hours with a brightness variation of 0.3 in magnitude (U=3). Somewhat higher amplitudes of 0.42 and 0.62 magnitude were found by the NEOWISE mission.

=== Diameter and albedo ===
According to the space-based surveys carried out by the Infrared Astronomical Satellite IRAS, the Japanese Akari satellite, and NASA's Wide-field Infrared Survey Explorer with its subsequent NEOWISE mission, Subbotina measures between 34.8 and 43.0 kilometers in diameter and its surface has a notably low albedo in the range of 0.02 to 0.049. The Collaborative Asteroid Lightcurve Link derives an albedo of 0.04 and a diameter of 36.5 kilometers with an absolute magnitude of 11.3.
