= 1767 Lampland =

Main-belt asteroid

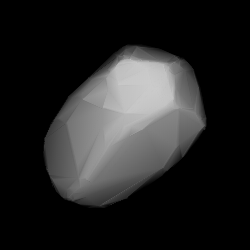
- Shape model of Lampland from its lightcurve

Discovery
- Discovered by: Indiana University (Indiana Asteroid Program)
- Discovery site: Goethe Link Obs.
- Discovery date: 7 September 1962

Designations
- Named after: Carl Lampland (American astronomer)
- Alternative designations: 1962 RJ · 1941 SP; 1967 SC
- Minor planet category: main-belt · (outer); Eos

Orbital characteristics
- Epoch 4 September 2017 (JD 2458000.5)
- Uncertainty parameter 0
- Observation arc: 75.52 yr (27,585 days)
- Aphelion: 3.3209 AU
- Perihelion: 2.7160 AU
- Semi-major axis: 3.0185 AU
- Eccentricity: 0.1002
- Orbital period (sidereal): 5.24 yr (1,915 days)
- Mean anomaly: 201.21°
- Mean motion: 0° 11^{m} 16.44^{s} / day
- Inclination: 9.8418°
- Longitude of ascending node: 192.22°
- Argument of perihelion: 135.41°

Physical characteristics
- Dimensions: 15.448±2.805 km
- Geometric albedo: 0.116±0.057
- Spectral type: Tholen = XC; B–V = 0.750; U–B = 0.340
- Absolute magnitude (H): 12.20

1767 Lampland, provisional designation 1962 RJ, is an Eoan asteroid from the outer regions of the asteroid belt, approximately 15 kilometers in diameter. It was discovered on 7 September 1962, by astronomers of the Indiana Asteroid Program at Goethe Link Observatory in Indiana, United States. The asteroid was named after American astronomer Carl Lampland.

== Orbit and classification ==
Lampland a member the Eos family (606), the largest asteroid family in the outer main belt consisting of nearly 10,000 asteroids. It orbits the Sun at a distance of 2.7–3.3 AU once every 5 years and 3 months (1,915 days). Its orbit has an eccentricity of 0.10 and an inclination of 10° with respect to the ecliptic.

The asteroid was first identified as 1941 SP at Uccle Observatory in September 1941. The body's observation arc begins with a precovery at Palomar Observatory in August 1951, more than 11 years prior to its official discovery observation at Goethe Link.

== Physical characteristics ==
In the Tholen classification, its spectral type is ambiguous, closest to the X-type asteroid and with some resemblance to the C-type asteroids, while the overall spectral type of the Eos family is that of a K-type.

=== Rotation period ===
As of 2017, no rotational lightcurve of Lampland has been obtained from photometric observations. The asteroid's rotation period, poles and shape remain unknown.

=== Diameter and albedo ===
According to the survey carried out by the NEOWISE mission of NASA's Wide-field Infrared Survey Explorer, Lampland measures 15.448 kilometers in diameter and its surface has an albedo of 0.116.

== Naming ==
This minor planet was named after American astronomer Carl Lampland (1873–1951), a graduate of Indiana University, best known for his radiometric measurements of planetary temperatures.

Lampland is also honored by a lunar and by a Martian crater. The name was proposed by Frank K. Edmondson, who initiated the Indiana Asteroid Program. The official naming citation was published by the Minor Planet Center on 20 February 1971 (M.P.C. 3144).
