= Subbotin (crater) =

Crater on the Moon

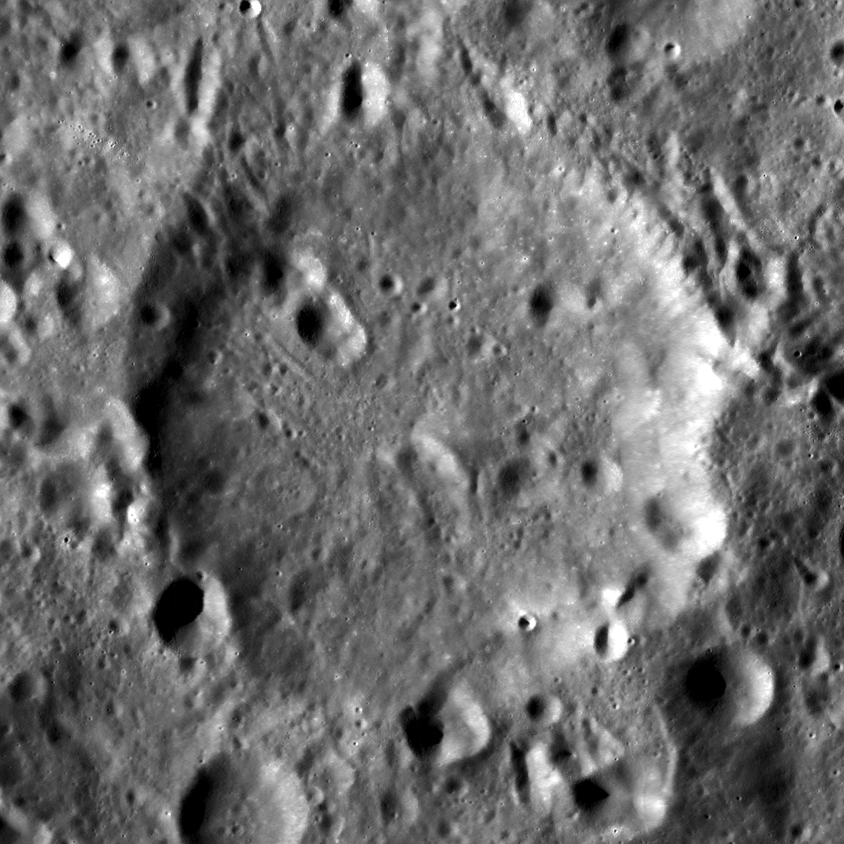
- LRO image
- Coordinates: 29.2°S 135.3°E
- Diameter: 67 km
- Depth: unknown
- Colongitude: 225° at sunrise
- Eponym: Mikhail F. Subbotin

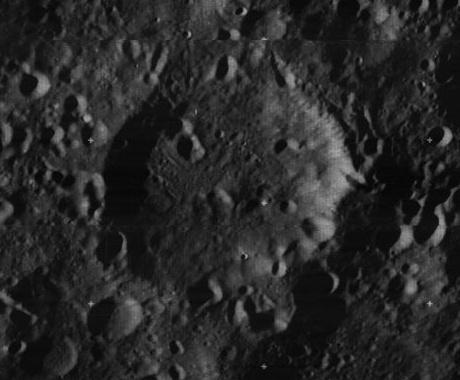
Lunar Orbiter 3 image

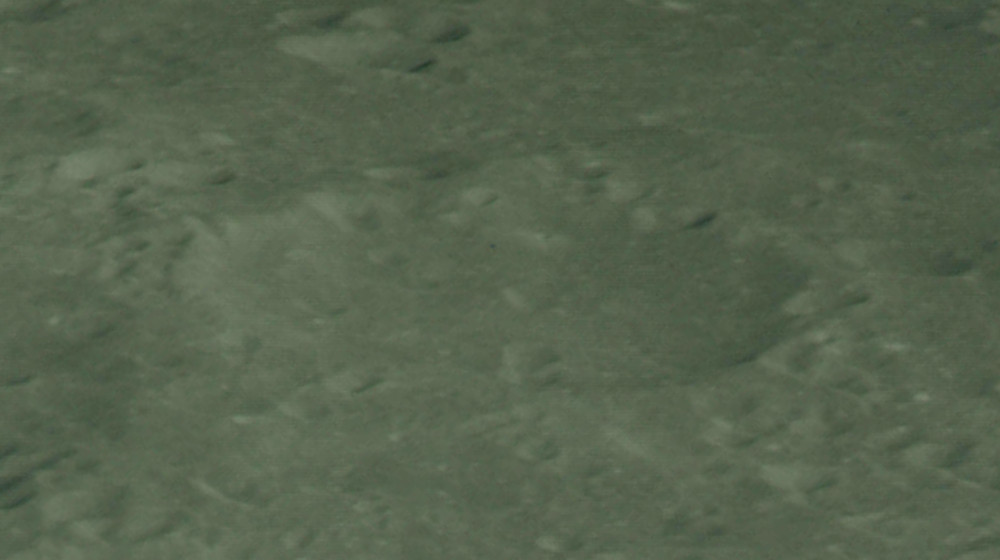
Oblique Apollo 13 image

Subbotin is a lunar impact crater that is located to the west of the larger crater Pavlov, and to the east-northeast of Lampland. Subbotin lies on the far side of the Moon, and can only be viewed from lunar orbit. It was named after the Soviet mathematician and astronomer Mikhail Subbotin.

Since its formation, this crater has been heavily battered by smaller impacts, leaving the outer rim worn and marked by several small craterlets. This pattern of impact extends into the interior floor, where there are multiple small craterlets. A short chain of these impacts begins in the northwest part of the interior and curves back to extend across the northern rim.

== Satellite craters ==
By convention these features are identified on lunar maps by placing the letter on the side of the crater midpoint that is closest to Subbotin.

Subbotin	Latitude	Longitude	Diameter
J	32.0° S	138.1° E	16 km
Q	30.8° S	134.3° E	17 km
R	31.3° S	133.7° E	16 km

== See also ==
- 1692 Subbotina, minor planet
