= Mikhail Subbotin =

Soviet mathematician and astronomer

Mikhail Fedorovich Subbotin
- Born: June 29, 1893; Ostrolenka, Vistula Land. Russian Empire (now Ostrołęka, Poland)
- Died: December 26, 1966 (aged 73); Leningrad, USSR (now St Petersburg, Russia)
- Citizenship: Russian, Soviet
- Education: Warsaw University, Donskoy Polytechnic Institute (Novocherkassk)
- Known for: Celestial mechanics
- Awards: Copernicus Scholarship, Academy of Sciences of the U.S.S.R., Order of the Red Banner of Labor and Order of Lenin
- Scientific career
- Fields: Mathematician

Mikhail Fedorovich Subbotin (Russian: Михаил Фёдорович Субботин, 29 June 1893 – 26 December 1966) was a Soviet mathematician and astronomer who calculated orbits of planets and comets. He worked on general properties of motion in the n-body problem.

== Biography and education ==
Subbotin was born on 29 June 1893 in Ostrolenka, Russian Empire (now Ostrołęka, Poland). His father was Fedor Subbotin, who was an army officer.

Mikhail Fedorovich Subbotin studied in the Faculty of Physics and Mathematics at the University of Warsaw in 1910 and graduated in 1914. He had an interest in astronomy, and worked as a calculator at the university observatory. After graduating he continued on as a junior astronomer.

In 1915, the University of Warsaw was evacuated to Rostov-on-Don after the German army invaded Poland, and Subbotin completed his master's degree there in 1917. During this time he also published two papers, “On the determination of singular points of analytic functions” and another on singular points of certain differential equations. He then moved to the Donskoy Polytechnic Institute (Novocherkassk) where he was appointed a professor of mathematics. In 1922, he accepted an offer to work at the Central Astronomical Observatory of the Russian Academy of Sciences as Director in Tashkent.

Preceding and during World War II, Subbotin worked at various astronomical institutions in Leningrad (Saint Petersburg). Subbotin almost starved to death during the Siege of Leningrad, and was evacuated in February 1942 to Sverdlovsk to recover. Near the end of 1942 Subbotin became the Director of the Leningrad Astronomical Institute, and relocated to Saratov before it was brought back to Leningrad after the German withdrawal. On 6 June 1945 Subbotin received the Order of the Red Banner of Labor. In 1963 he was awarded the Order of Lenin.

Subbotin died on 26 December 1966 in then Leningrad, USSR (now Saint Petersburg, Russia). A memorial plaque was installed at his house at Moskovsky Prospect 206 in 1971 (architect V. V. Isaeva)

== Works ==
Subbotin started his career working on the theory of functions and probability. He worked on the creation of a catalog of faint stars. After his studies moved to astronomy, he concentrated on celestial mechanics to devise new methods to calculate orbits from three observations based on solving the Euler–Lambert equations.

“... Subbotin not only showed the possibility of improving the convergence of the trigonometric series by which the behaviour of perturbing forces is represented, but also gave an expression for determining Laplace coefficients and presented formulas for computing the coefficients of the necessary members of the trigonometric series.”

Subbotin wrote a three-volume work called “Course in Celestial Mechanics" (1933–49), in which for the first time in Russian the main questions of celestial mechanics were described in detail. He was the author of a number of fundamental studies on the history of astronomy. He was the editor-in-chief of the Astronomical Yearbook of the USSR, published by the Institute of Theoretical Astronomy of the Academy of Sciences of the USSR.

== Celestial objects named after Subbotin ==
- 1692 Subbotina, is a carbonaceous asteroid from the middle region of the asteroid belt, approximately 37 kilometers in diameter.
- Subbotin is a 67 km-wide lunar crater on the far side of the Moon.

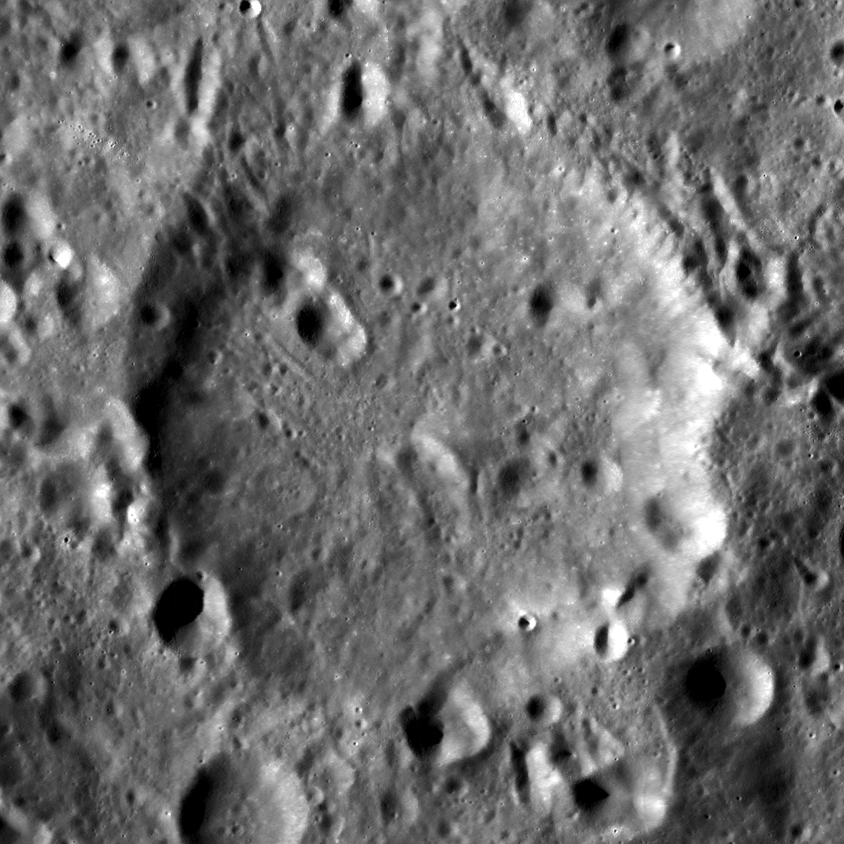
Subbotin Moon crater
