= Sophia Bardina =

Russian revolutionary (1853–1883)

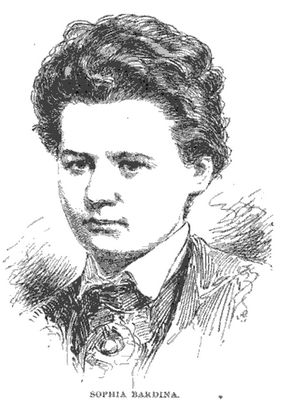
Sophia Bardina, from an 1891 publication.

Sophia Illarionovna Bardina (15 May 1853 – 26 April 1883) was a Russian revolutionary.

== Biography ==
She was born in Morshansk, to a violent father, and turned to her studies for solace. Her family were landowners in Tver province, so she decided to study agronomy so that she could farm the land, rather than live off peasant labour. Bardina went to Moscow and became friends with Olga Liubatovich. Together, they went to study in Zurich., where Bardina was a leading figure in the Fritsche circle of young feminist Russian students, among whom she was known as 'Auntie', "on account of her reliability and diplomatic talents." It was she who introduced Vera Figner and her sister Lydia to radical political ideas. Vera Figner was later the most famous terrorist at large in Russia.

In 1873, the Russian government ordered all women students in Zurich to return home. Bardina returned to Moscow, and in 1874, and obtained a job in a factory, hoping to recruit workers for the revolutionary movement. She was arrested in 1875 and spent two years in prison in Moscow. and was a defendant at the Trial of the 50, alongside Olga Lyubatovich, Lydia Figner, Pyotr Alexeyev and others. In court, she delivered a defiant speech that was deleted from the record of the trial. She was sentenced to 10 years hard labour, later commuted to exile in Siberia. She escaped in 1880 and returned to Switzerland, where she fell seriously ill and died by suicide in Geneva.

== Quotes ==
"Yes, we are anarchists, but, for us, anarchy does not signify disorder, but harmony in all social relations; for us, anarchy is nothing but the negation of oppressions which stifle the development of free societies."
