= Vera Liubatovich =

Russian revolutionary (1855–1907)

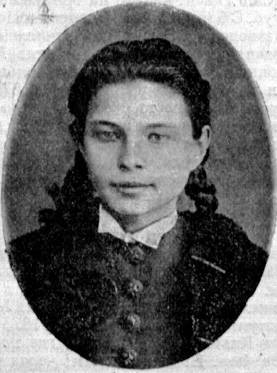
Vera Liubatovich

Vera Liubatovich (Russian: Вера Спиридоновна Любатович; 1855–1907) was a Russian revolutionary and a founding member of the All-Russian Social-Revolutionary Organization.

== Biography ==
Vera Spiridonovna Liubatovich was born in Moscow on 7 August 1855 (O.S.: 26 July 1855). Her sister was Olga Lyubatovich (1853–1917). Vera attended the Second Moscow Women's Gymnasium from 1868 to 1871. She and Olga moved to Switzerland in 1871.

In 1873, at 17, Liubatovich enrolled in the Medical Faculty of the University of Zurich. She was a member of the Fritschi Circle (named after Zurich landlady Frau Fritsch).

A Narodnik and propagandist, Liubatovich co-founded the All-Russian Social-Revolutionary Organization, the first formal organization of Russian Populists. She was in charge of communications with the provinces and with those revolutionaries who had been imprisoned. She was arrested in 1875. Following the Trial of the Fifty in 1877, she was sentenced to six years of forced labour. Her sentenced was commuted to exile in Siberia. She married V.A. Ostashkin in 1880 and stayed in Siberia until the 1890s, later living in Oryol and Moscow. She died in Moscow on 19 December 1907.
