= Bezimenne gas field =

Natural gas field on the continental shelf of the Black Sea

Bezimenne
- Country: Ukraine
- Region: Black Sea
- Offshore/onshore: offshore
- Partners: Chornomornaftogaz

Field history
- Discovery: 1997
- Start of development: 1997
- Start of production: 1997

Production
- Current production of gas: 500×10^{3} m^{3}/d 20×10^{6} cu ft/d 0.15×10^{9} m^{3}/a (5.3×10^{9} cu ft/a)
- Estimated gas in place: 4×10^{9} m^{3} 140×10^{9} cu ft

The Bezimenne gas field natural gas field located on the continental shelf of the Black Sea. It was discovered in 1997 and developed by Chornomornaftogaz. It started commercial production in 1997. The total proven reserves of the Bezimenne gas field are around 140 billion cubic feet (4.0×10^{9} m^{3}), and production is slated to be around 20 million cubic feet per day (570×10^{3} m^{3}/d) in 2015.

Under Chornomornaftogaz, in 2009 a major extraction project began for the gas field, which was approved by the Ukrainian government. Following the highly disputed Russian annexation of Crimea, the gas field and Chornomornaftogaz were seized by Russia, which led Ukraine to initiate an international arbitration case under the UN Convention on the Law of the Sea. In 2017, it was confirmed that starting in 2018, operations at the gas field would cease due to the ongoing arbitration case and international sanctions over the Russian control of Crimea.

== History ==
Commercial production of the gas field began in 1997.

In March 2009, the Cabinet of Ministers of Ukraine under Yulia Tymoshenko approved a project for the development of the Bezimenne gas field, superseding an earlier 2007 decree. The project was set to be developed with the cooperation of the "Shelf" LLC, the state enterprise "Ukrderzbbbudekspertyza", and Chornomornaftogaz. The projected total accumulated gas extraction during the development project was set at 1,690 million cubic metres with the extraction cost during the project estimated to be over 1.1 billion hryvnias.

Following the highly disputed Russian annexation of Crimea in March 2014, the Bezimenne gas field - alongside much of Chornomornaftogaz assets - came under Russian control. Following this, Ukraine initiated an international arbitration proceeding against Russia in September 2016 under the UN Convention on the Law of the Sea, claiming that the use of resources on the Black and Azov Sea shelves was in Ukrainian waters. In November 2017, the director-general of the now Russian-controlled Chornomornaftogaz issued an internal order to revise the company's production, which as a result, led to the order to cease operations at the Bezimenne gas field starting in July 2018, although existing wells would be conserved. The director-general indicated this was in response to the ongoing arbitration dispute with Ukraine and also due to international sanctions.
