= Izmalkovsky District =

Izmalkovsky District Измалковский район (Russian)
- District
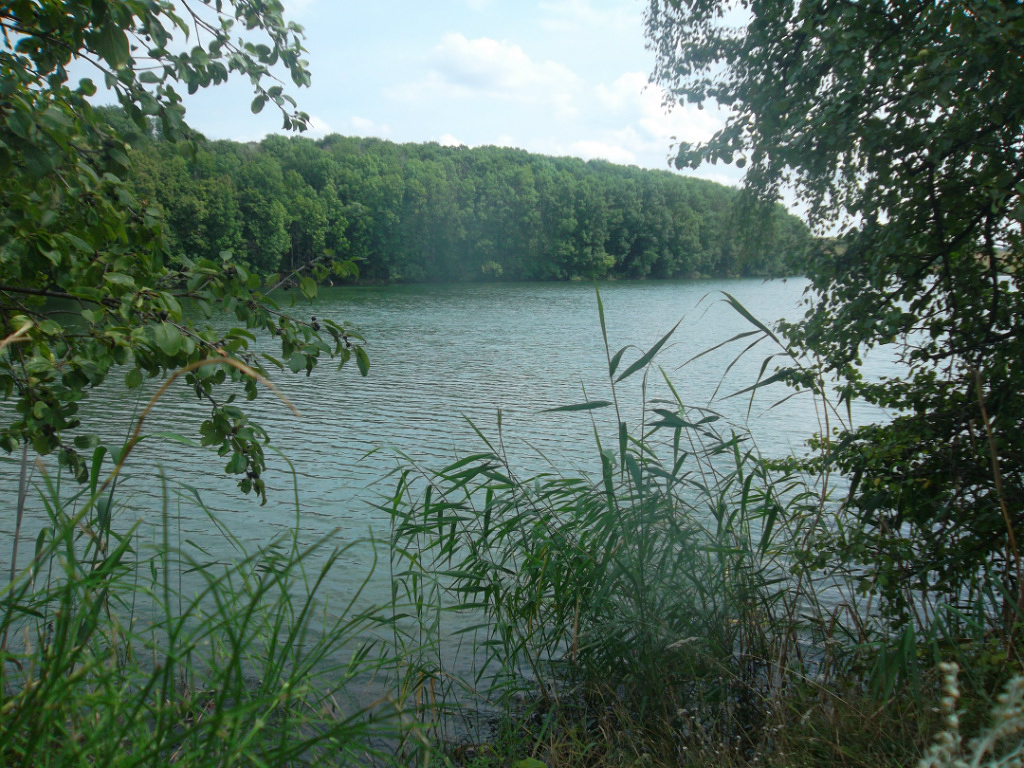
- Krivets River, Izmalkovsky District

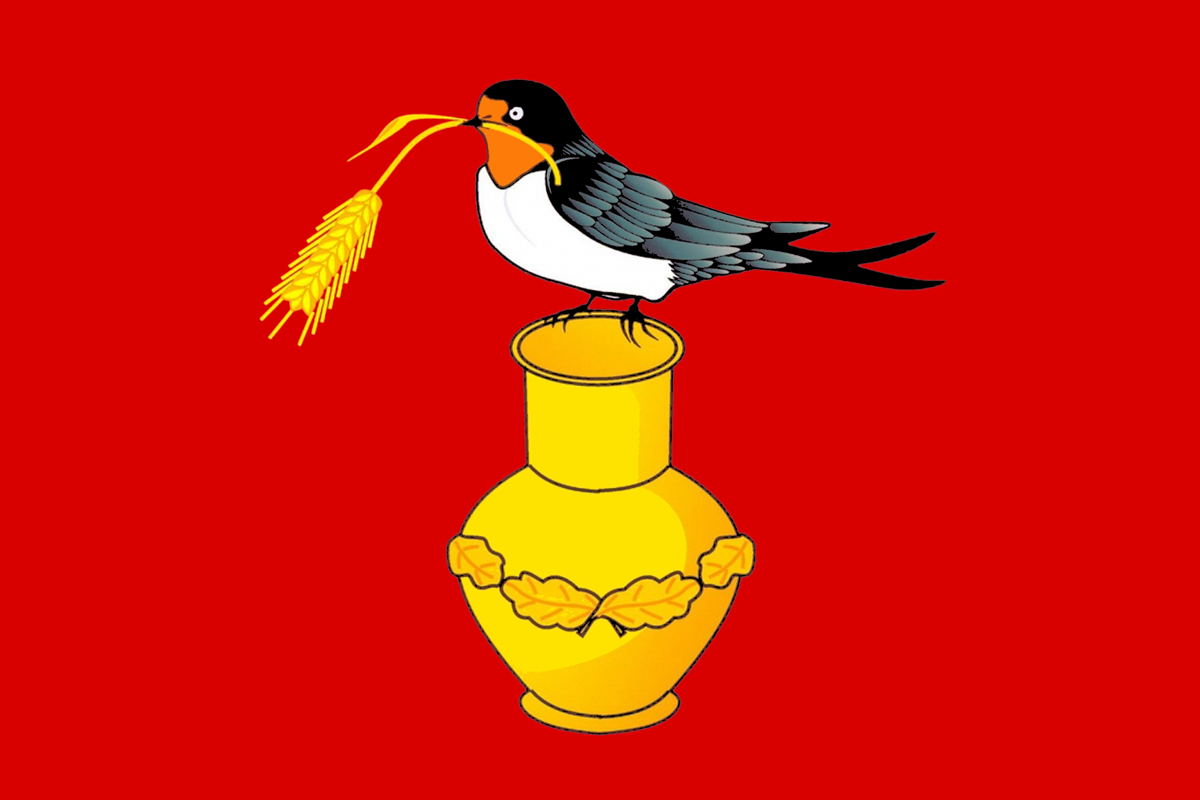
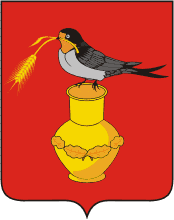
- Flag Coat of arms
- Location of Izmalkovsky District in Lipetsk Oblast
- Coordinates: 52°41′21″N 37°58′47″E
- Country: Russia
- Federal subject: Lipetsk Oblast
- Administrative center: Izmalkovo

Area
  - Total: 1,130 km^{2} (440 sq mi)

Population (2010 Census)
  - Total: 17,281
  - Density: 15.3/km^{2} (39.6/sq mi)
  - Urban: 0%
  - Rural: 100%

Administrative structure
  - Administrative divisions: 13 selsoviet
  - Inhabited localities: 120 rural localities

Municipal structure
  - Municipally incorporated as: Izmalkovsky Municipal District
  - Municipal divisions: 0 urban settlements, 13 rural settlements
- Time zone: UTC+3 (MSK)
- OKTMO ID: 42627000
- Website: http://www.izmalkovol.ru/

Izmalkovsky District (Russian: Изма́лковский райо́н) is an administrative and municipal district (raion), one of the eighteen in Lipetsk Oblast, Russia. It is located in the west of the oblast. The area of the district is 1,130 square kilometers (440 sq mi). Its administrative center is the rural locality (a selo) of Izmalkovo. Population: 15,209 (2021 census); 17,281 (2010 census); 18,813 (2002 Census); 20,404 (1989 Soviet census). The population of Izmalkovo accounts for 24.0% of the district's total population.
