= Carl Otto Lampland =

American astronomer (1873–1951)

Minor planets discovered: 1
1604 Tombaugh	24 March 1931	list

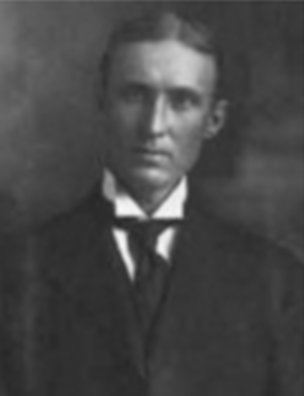
Carl Otto Lampland, c. 1920

Carl Otto Lampland (December 29, 1873 – December 14, 1951) was an American astronomer. He was involved with both of the Lowell Observatory solar system projects, observations of the planet Mars and the search for Planet X.

The Lampland Martian crater and Lampland Lunar crater are named in his honor.

== Biography ==
Carl Otto Lampland was born near Hayfield in Dodge County, Minnesota. He was born into a family of ten children. Both his father Ole Helliksen Lampland (1834–1914) and his mother Berit Gulliksdatter Skartum (1850–1943) were born in Norway.

He was educated first at Valparaiso Normal School in Valparaiso, Indiana, where he earned a B.S. degree in 1899. He then studied at Indiana University Bloomington, where he received a B.A. degree in astronomy in 1902, an M.A. in 1906, and an honorary LL.D in 1930.

He first went to Lowell Observatory in 1902 when invited by Percival Lowell and Lampland was closely involved with Lowell in planetary observation. He designed cameras used for astronomy and also designed and maintained telescopes, including resilvering the mirror of the 40-inch (1,000 mm) telescope. He also constructed thermocouples and used them to measure temperatures of planets. He won the Royal Photographic Society Medal in 1905 for the camera which he designed for the 24-inch Clark telescope. Together with William Coblentz, he measured large differences between the day and night temperatures on Mars which implied a thin Martian atmosphere. He discovered the asteroid 1604 Tombaugh. In 1907 Lampland and Lowell won a Royal Photographic Society exhibition medal for their photographs of Mars.

Lampland at the Fourth Conference International Union for Cooperation in Solar Research at Mount Wilson Observatory, 1910

== Honors ==
- Lampland was elected to the American Academy of Arts and Sciences in 1915.
- Lampland was elected to the American Philosophical Society in 1931.
- The asteroid 1767 Lampland was named in his memory.
- The lunar crater Lampland was named after him.
- The Martian crater Lampland was also named after him.
- The C.O. Lampland Collection is maintained at the Lowell Observatory Archives in Flagstaff.
- His date of birth is the starting point for the Mars Sol Date calendar.

== Related reading ==
- Slipher, Earl C. (1962) The Photographic Story of Mars (Cambridge Massachusetts: Sky Publishing)
- Croswell, Ken (1997) Planet Quest: The Epic Discovery of Alien Solar Systems (New York: The Free Press) ISBN 978-0684832524
- Hughes, Stefan (2012) Catchers of the Light: The Forgotten Lives of the Men and Women Who First Photographed the Heavens (ArtDeCiel Publishing) ISBN 978-1620509616. OCLC 826821840
- Littman, Mark (1990) Planets Beyond: Discovering the Outer Solar System (New York: Wiley) ISBN 978-0471510536
- Schilling, Govert (2009) The Hunt for Planet X: New Worlds and the Fate of Pluto (New York: Springer) ISBN 978-0387778044
