= Lampland (lunar crater) =

Crater on the Moon

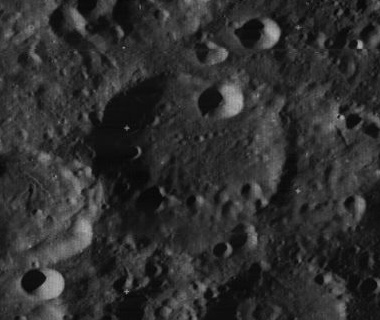
- Lunar Orbiter 3 image
- Coordinates: 31.0°S 131.0°E
- Diameter: 65 km
- Depth: Unknown
- Colongitude: 229° at sunrise
- Eponym: Carl O. Lampland

Lampland is a crater on the far side of the Moon. It lies to the west-southwest of the crater Subbotin, and to the north-northwest of Eötvös. About four crater diameters to the north-northwest lies the prominent Tsiolkovskiy.

A small pit intrudes into the west-southwestern rim. A small, cup-shaped impact crater, Lampland A, lies along the northeast inner wall and part of the floor. The interior of Lampland is marked by several small craters which are located mostly in the southern half. There is a slightly darker patch of terrain in the southeast part of the interior.

== Satellite craters ==
By convention these features are identified on lunar maps by placing the letter on the side of the crater midpoint that is closest to Lampland.

Lampland	Latitude	Longitude	Diameter
A	30.4° S	131.2° E	14 km
B	29.5° S	131.6° E	12 km
K	33.0° S	132.5° E	47 km
M	33.5° S	130.8° E	38 km
Q	32.5° S	129.4° E	12 km
R	31.7° S	129.2° E	45 km

== See also ==
- 1767 Lampland, asteroid
