= Subbotin oil field =

Black Sea natural gas field

Subbotinske
- Country: de jure: Ukraine de facto: Russia
- Region: Black Sea
- Offshore/onshore: offshore
- Operator: Chornomornaftogaz

Field history
- Discovery: 1978

Production
- Estimated oil in place: 33.3 million tonnes (~ 38.8×10^{6} m^{3} or 244 million bbl)
- Recoverable oil (million tonnes): 6.23 million tonnes

The Subbotin oil field (Russian: месторождение Субботина) is an oil and gas field located on the continental shelf of the Black Sea near Crimea. It was discovered in 1978 by seismic exploration, and evaluated after deep drilling in 2005–2011. The field is being developed by the Crimean company Chornomornaftogaz.
