= Belomestnoye, Novooskolsky District, Belgorod Oblast =

Belomestnoye Беломестное
- Selo
- Location within Belgorod Oblast Location within Russia
- Coordinates: 50°41′N 37°43′E
- Country: Russia
- Region: Belgorod Oblast
- District: Novooskolsky District
- Time zone: UTC+3:00

Belomestnoye (Russian: Беломестное) is a rural locality (a selo) and the administrative center of Belomestnenskoye Rural Settlement, Novooskolsky District, Belgorod Oblast, Russia. The population was 1,091 as of 2010. There are 10 streets.

== Geography ==
Belomestnoye is located 17 km southwest of Novy Oskol (the district's administrative centre) by road. Yendovino is the nearest rural locality.
