= Varvara Alexandrova =

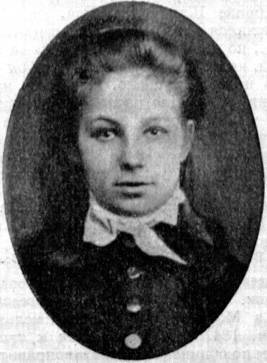
Varvara Alexandrova

Varvara Ivanovna Alexandrova (Russian: Варвара Ивановна Александрова; 1853-27 August 1924) was a Russian revolutionary and populist.

Alexandrova was the fourth of six daughters of a wealthy Moscow merchant. In 1872, she went to Zurich to study at the medical faculty of University of Zurich. There, she joined the Fritsche Circle, an all-female group of 13 young radicals, including Vera Figner, and worked as a typesetter for the Narodnik journal Forward. After the Russian government had ordered students abroad to return home, in 1874, she moved first to Paris, then to Russia, and obtained a job as a worker as a weaving factory in Ivanovo-Vosnesensk, to conduct propaganda among the workforce. She was arrested in August 1875, and appeared with several other former members of the Fritsche circle as a defendant at the Trial of the 50, in March 1877, and sentenced to loss of all rights and exile in Irkutsk province. There she met and married a fellow exile, Mark Natanson, and voluntarily accompanied him into exile in Yakutsk. At the end of her term of exile, in 1883, she was permitted to live anywhere in Russia other than St Petersburg. She worked for the Illegal Red Cross for the Relief of Exiles and Prisoners. She emigrated again to western Europe in 1888. Later, she was a founder member of the Socialist Revolutionary Party. She returned to Russia in 1917. When Natanson was terminally ill, in 1919, she accompanied him to Switzerland, where he was to be treated, returning a widow. She died in Moscow, from cancer, on August 27, 1924
