= Chornomornaftogaz =

Oil and gas company in Crimea

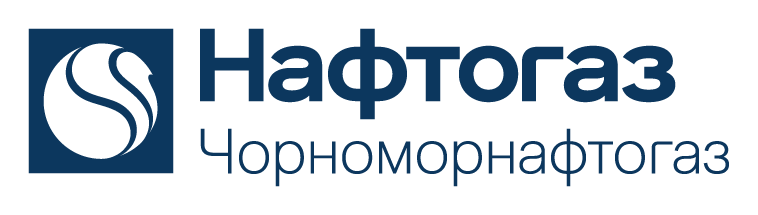
- Native name: Чорноморнафтогаз
- Type: State joint-stock enterprise
- Industry: Oil and gas
- Founded: October 20, 1978
- Founder: Ministry of Gas Industry of the USSR
- Headquarters: Kyiv, Ukraine
- Area served: Black Sea
- Key people: Svitlana Nezhnova
- Products: Natural gas Crude oil Natural-gas condensate
- Production output: 1.651 billion cubic metres (58.3×10^{9} cu ft) of natural gas (2013)
- Services: Pipeline transportation Natural gas distribution
- Revenue: $261,444 (2023)
- Operating income: −$2.98 million (2023)
- Net income: −$2.97 million (2023)
- Total assets: $22.6 million (31 December 2023; 2025)
- Total equity: −$332 million (31 December 2023)
- Owner: Naftogaz
- Number of employees: 46,752 (2025)
- Parent: Naftogaz
- Website: chornomornaftogaz.com.ua

Chornomornaftogaz (Ukrainian: Чорноморнафтогаз, lit. "Black Sea oil and gas") is a Ukrainian oil and gas company with natural gas fields in the Black Sea.

The company was established in Ukrainian Simferopol, Crimea with the order of the Ministry of Gas Industry of the USSR on 20 October 1978 №209-org to develop oil and gas resources in the Black Sea and the Sea of Azov.

It is legally a subsidiary of Ukraine's state-owned oil and gas company Naftogaz. However, after the 2014 Crimean crisis part of its property was seized by the region's parliament in the run-up to its annexation by Russia. There was also a privately owned oil company Chernomorneftegaz, registered in Moscow in 1998 and purchased by Rosneft in 2011, which is not linked to Chornomornaftogaz. In September 2023 the Ukrainian forces had re-taken the Boyko towers in the Black Sea, that belong to the Ukrainian company.

== History ==
The company was established with the order of the Ministry of Gas Industry of the USSR on October 20, 1978 №209-org to develop oil and gas resources in the Black Sea and the Sea of Azov.

The May 2012 purchase of Petro Hodovanets (ex-West Juno) and Nezalezhnist was criticized due to corruption and money laundering allegations and higher purchase price than the market price. These rigs were nicknamed the "Boyko towers" after the former energy minister Yuriy Boyko.

Its total reserves of all fields are estimated at 58.6 billion cubic metres (2.07×10^{12} cu ft) of natural gas, 1.231 million tons of natural-gas condensate, and 2.53 million tons of crude oil.

In 2013, Chornomornaftogaz produced 1.651 billion cubic metres (58.3×10^{9} cu ft) of natural gas. In 2012, it produced 1.174 billion cubic metres (41.5×10^{9} cu ft) of natural gas, 62,800 tonnes of natural-gas condensate, and 8,900 tonnes of crude oil. The research group IHS reported that in 2013 Chornomorneftegaz accounted for 7.9% of Ukraine's gas production and 2.4% of its oil production.

=== Russo–Ukrainian War ===
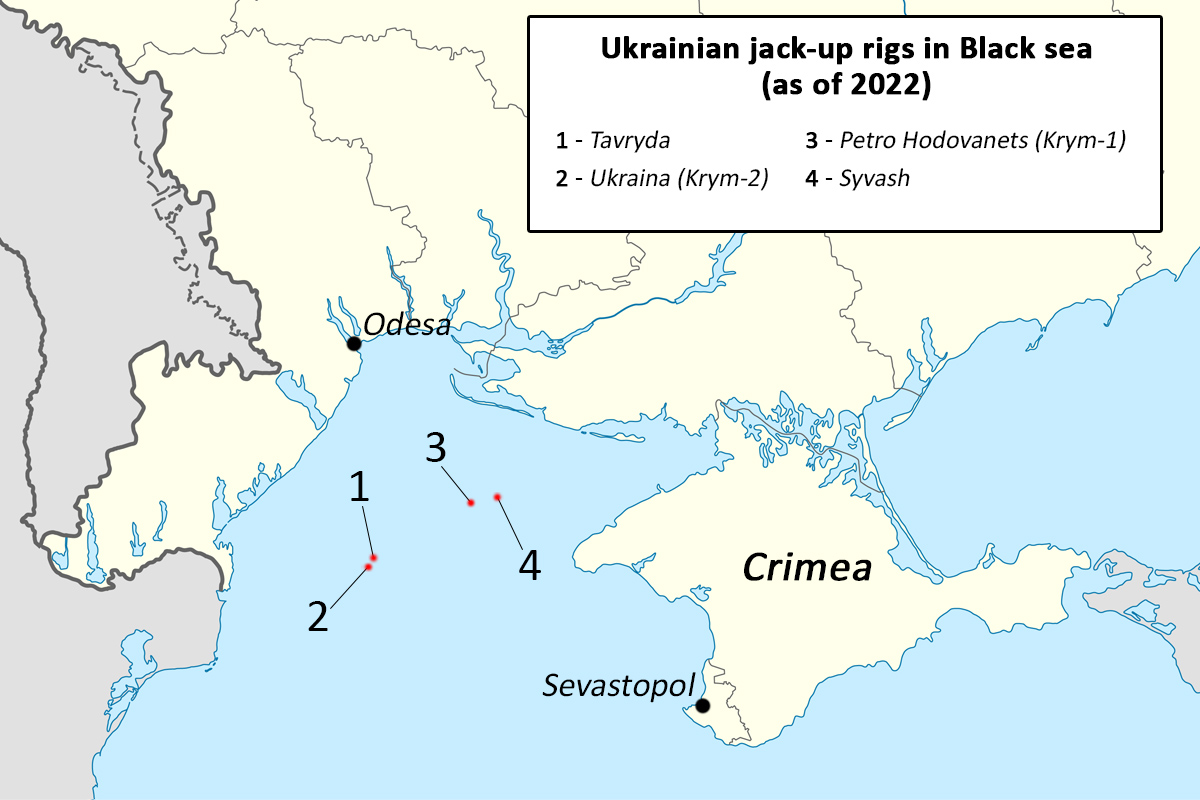
Ukrainian jack-up rigs in the Black Sea were captured by Russia in 2014. In September 2023 Ukraine stated it has regained control of the jack-up rigs.

In the run-up to the annexation of Crimea by the Russian Federation in 2014 the company was seized by the Crimean parliament.

In February 2014, Ukraine's state-owned oil and gas company Naftogaz sued Chornomornaftogaz for delayed debt payments of ₴11.614 billion (almost €1 billion) in the Economic Court of the Crimean Autonomous Republic.

In March 2014, Crimean authorities announced that they would nationalize the company. Crimean deputy prime minister Rustam Temirgaliev said that Russia's Gazprom would be the new owner. A group of Gazprom representatives, including its head of business development, has been working at the Chornomornaftogaz head office since mid-March 2014. Formally, nationalized assets were transferred to the newly established company Crimean Republican Enterprise Chernomorneftegaz, which was later reorganized into state unitary enterprise Chernomorneftegaz. On 11 April 2014, the U.S. Treasury's Office of Foreign Assets Control announced that it had added Chornomornaftagaz to the Specially Designated Nationals and Blocked Persons List as part of the U.S. sanctions against Russia. Reuters quoted an anonymous U.S. official who explained that the United States wanted to make it impossible for Gazprom to "have dealings with Chornomornaftogaz", and if that were to happen, Gazprom itself could face sanctions. The European Union followed suit on 13 May 2014, the first time its sanctions list has included a company. Naftogaz has considered to file a suit against Russia in international arbitration for a compensation for the seized company.

In December 2015, Chornomornaftogaz moved two jack-up rigs—Tavrida and Petro Hodovanets—from Odeske gas field to Russian territorial waters due to disputed status of the field and a risk that rigs will be arrested by the Ukrainian authorities.

On 20 June 2022, when the 2022 Russian invasion of Ukraine was in full swing, Sergey Aksyonov announced that "the enemy" had struck an undisclosed Chornomornaftogaz production facility somewhere in the Black Sea near Tarkhankut, the southwestern cape of the peninsula. Aksyonov reported that there had been three strikes at three natural gas rigs.

In September 2023 it was reported that Ukrainian forces had re-taken the Boyko towers.

== Operations ==
Chornomornaftogaz is an integrated oil and gas company engaged in natural gas explorations and production, transport, storage, and distribution. It operates the Hlibovske underground gas storage. Its offshore operations are concentrated primarily in the northwestern part of the Black Sea shelf.

The company has licenses for 17 fields, including 11 gas fields, four oil fields and two gas condensate fields. Its licenses for offshore fields include:

- Odeske,
- Shtormove,
- Prykerchenske,
- Holitsynske,
- Arkhangelske,
- Bezimenne,
- Subotinske, and
- Strilkove

In addition it owns licenses for Jankoy and Semenivske onshore fields.

The company owns four jack-up rigs (Syvash, Tavrida, Petro Hodovanets, and Nezalezhnist) and eight fixed drilling platforms.
