= Society of Former Political Prisoners and Exiled Settlers =

- Общество бывших политкаторжан и ссыльнопоселенцев
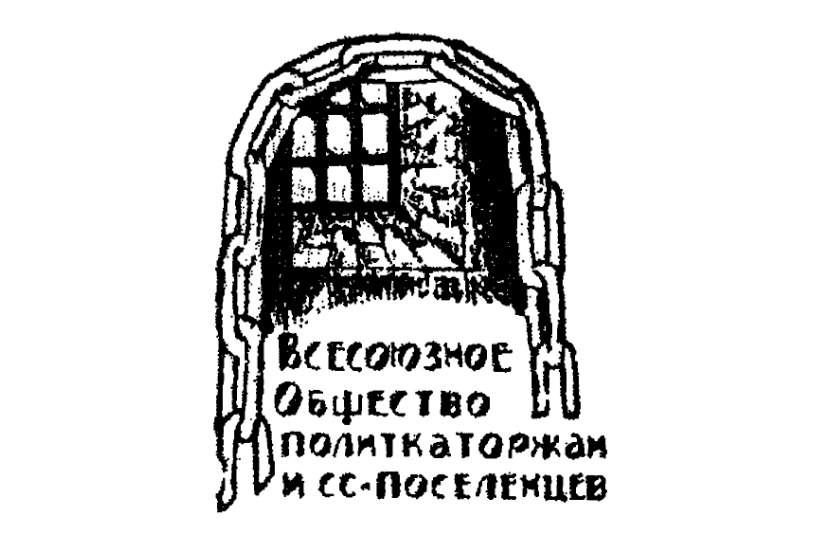
- Abbreviation: OBPKiS
- Formation: 12 March 1921
- Founder: Pavel Maslov; Dmitry Novomirsky
- Founded at: House of the Unions, Moscow, Russian SFSR
- Dissolved: 1935
- Chairman: Alexander Andreyev
- Publication: Каторга и ссылка
- Subsidiaries: MOPR

The Society of Former Political Prisoners and Exiled Settlers (Russian: Общество бывших политкаторжан и ссыльнопоселенцев, OBPKiS) was a public organization in the Soviet Union between 1921–1935, that worked to record the history of imprisonment under the Tsarist regime and aid former political prisoners.

== History ==
The Society was founded by Pavel Maslov (born 1890), Dmitry Novomirsky, and others. The opening took place in Moscow in the House of Unions on March 12, 1921.

In 1921, OBPKiS had 200 members. Among them were prominent participants in the revolutionary movement, like Vladimir Vilensky (Sibiryakov), Vera Figner, Lev Deich, Nikolai Tyutchev, Felix Kon, Mikhail Frolenko, Anna Yakimova-Dikovskaya, Alexander Pribylev, Anna Pribyleva-Korba, Fedor Petrov, Vadim Bystryansky, Nikolai Skrypnik, Ivan Theodorovich, Vladimir Zhdanov. OBPKiS was led by the Council. From 1924, the Society transformed into an all-Union organization; in 1928, it had over 50 branches. Its members delivered reports and lectures to workers, students, and Red Army soldiers. In 1924, 1925, 1928, and 1931, all-union congresses of society took place.

In 1926, the Society founded a museum with a library and archive. With the Society of Old Bolsheviks, OBPKiS created the International Red Aid (1922).

Former political prisoners rested in the Mikhailovskoye estate, which belonged to Sergey Sheremetev before the revolution. Today, the Mikhailovskoye sanatorium is located at the estate.

Just before OBPKiS was disbanded, the House of Political Prisoners on Revolution Square was built for them in Leningrad.

The Society was disbanded in 1935. During the Great Purge, 130 former members of OBPKiS were executed, and another 90 were sent to forced labour camps. The last chairman of the society was Alexander Andreyev.

== Activities ==
OBPKiS provided material assistance to former political convicts and exiled settlers, organized lectures and reports, collected, stored, studied and published materials on the history of the imperial prison, penal servitude and exile.

The Society published the magazines Hard Labour and Exile (Каторга и ссылка) and the Bulletin of the Central Council of the All-Union Society of Former Political Prisoners and Exiled Settlers (Бюллетень Центрального совета Всесоюзного общества бывших политкаторжан и ссыльнопоселенцев), as well as the series Historical and Revolutionary Library and Classics of the Revolutionary Thought of the Pre-Marxist Period. Compositions and materials were also published on the life and work of Alexander Herzen, Nikolay Chernyshevsky, Nikolay Dobrolyubov, Mikhail Bakunin, Pyotr Tkachev, and Figner; five volumes of the bio-bibliographic dictionary Figures of the Revolutionary Movement in Russia; and memoirs and documents about the Decembrists, Narodism, the labor movement, the royal prison, penal servitude, and exile.

== Criticism ==
Figner, one of the oldest political prisoners in Tsarist Russia, wrote in response to a proposal to join the OBPKiS after its reorganization due to the increasing role of the Bolsheviks:

Your notice of July 8 threw me into embarrassment and encourages me to explain to you why until now, in principle, I have not joined the Society.

1. I am a principled opponent of the death penalty and twice together with some old comrades in the revolutionary movement filed a petition to the All-Russian Central Executive Committee to abolish it.

Meanwhile, a society drawn into politics sometimes makes it necessary to speak out about the use of this repression and, alas, expresses approval for its use.

2. Not knowing the modern method of political investigation of cases in which freedom and human life are on the map, not knowing what causes the recognition of those under investigation for their guilt in its complete absence, the Society, drawn into politics, is urged to give a resolution approving the activities of the State Political Administration, and, alas, gives approving sanction.

3. Following what is being done in government offices, the Society, drawn into politics, purges, using an unacceptable intrusion into the inner self of a person, and practices what angers all thinking people with the humiliation of the human person, instead of raise your voice against this method of control, which contradicts all our previous revolutionary ethics.

4. The Society drawn into politics, like all Russian citizens who aspired to freedom, civil and social equality, suffer inequality, having a monopoly political fraction and a subjugated majority, called non-partisan. I consider the situation of these two sides to be abnormal and for the majority constituents – humiliating.

...Being officially outside the Society, I always felt the burden of my position: the revolutionary environment is my native environment. I am connected with the Society, with the totality of its members, inextricable bonds, connected with my whole life, the life of a revolutionary and the life of a person.

...I am writing to you all this, guided solely by the fact that I can not and do not want to receive a sign of trust and honor in a thieves' way. Judge for yourself!

I have neither petty vanity nor petty ambition.

Vera Figner.

However, on page 664 of the 1934 edition of the Biographical Directory of Society Members, Figner is listed as a member of OBPKiS with ticket №2901.

== See also ==
- Memorial

== Sources ==
- Political Penal Servitude and Exile: Biographical Directory of Members of the Society of Political Prisoners and Exiled Settlers – Moscow, 1929
- Political Penal Servitude and Exile. Biographical Directory of Members of the Society of Political Prisoners and Exiled Settlers, Moscow, 1934
- All-Union Society of Political Prisoners and Exiled Settlers. Catalog of publications. 1921–1931, Moscow, 1931: the same, 1931–1934, Moscow, 1935
- Natalya Vasilyeva (1990). The All-Union Society of Former Political Prisoners and Exiled Settlers and its Role in the Study and Propaganda of the History of Social Democratic Exile to Siberia (1921–1935). Abstract of the Dissertation of the Candidate of Historical Sciences. Irkutsk.
- All-Union Society of Political Prisoners and Exiled Settlers. Formation, Development, Liquidation. 1921–1935. Links. 2004
