= Izmalkovo, Lipetsk Oblast =

Rural locality in Lipetsk Oblast, Russia

Izmalkovo Измалково
- Selo
- Interactive map of Izmalkovo
- Location of Izmalkovo Izmalkovo (Lipetsk Oblast)
- Coordinates: 52°41′17″N 37°57′39″E
- Country: Russia
- Federal subject: Lipetsk Oblast
- Administrative district: Izmalkovsky District
- SelsovietSelsoviet: Izmalkovsky
- Elevation: 232 m (761 ft)

Population (2010 Census)
  - Total: 4,015
  - Estimate (2021): 3,644 (−9.2%)

Administrative status
  - Capital of: Izmalkovsky District, Izmalkovsky Selsoviet

Municipal status
  - Municipal district: Izmalkovsky Municipal District
  - Rural settlement: Izmalkovsky Selsoviet Rural Settlement
  - Capital of: Izmalkovsky Municipal District, Izmalkovsky Selsoviet Rural Settlement
- Time zone: UTC+3 (MSK)
- Postal code: 399000
- OKTMO ID: 42627416101

Izmalkovo (Russian: Измалково) is a rural locality (a selo) and the administrative center of Izmalkovsky District, Lipetsk Oblast, Russia. Population: 3,644 (2021 census); 4,015 (2010 census); 4,108 (2002 census); 4,159 (1989 Soviet census).
