= Yakov Stefanovich =

Ukrainian narodnik revolutionary

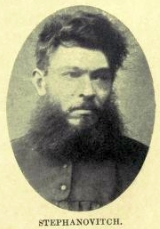

Yakov Vasilevich Stefanovich (Russian: Яков Васильевич Стефанович) (10 December (28 November old style) 1854 –14 April 1915) was a Ukrainian narodnik revolutionary.

Stefanovich led an unsuccessful attempt to incite a peasant revolt in Ukraine. He and his colleagues deceived participants by telling them the Russian tsar supported appropriating land from big landowners for the peasants.

== Early career ==
Yakov Stefanovich was born in the village of Deptivka, Sumy Oblast, Ukraine region of what was then the Konotopsky Uyezd, Chernigov Governorate, Russian Empire. The son of a village priest, he was educated in seminary, and then at Kiev University.

While at the university, Stefanovich joined the Kiev branch of the Chaykovsky circlean anarchist group, inspired by the writings of Mikhail Bakunin. In July 1874, he agreed to join Yekaterina Breshko-Breshkovskaya and Maria Kolenkina on a mission to 'go to the people' and spread propaganda in peasant villages. Stefanovich obtained a false passport, and posed as an itinerant cobbler.

After the three activists made contact with the peasants, Stefanovich was tipped off that he was likely to be arrested. He and Breshko-Breshkovskaya fled to Kherson province, where they contacted religious dissenters. Stefanovich unsuccessfully attempted to recruit them into rebellion by arguing that the apostles were opponents of autocratic rule.

After receiving a coded warning not to try to rejoin Breshko-Breshkovskaya, who had been arrested, Stefanovich returned to the university. During his second year there, in 1875, he was expelled for spreading revolutionary propaganda.

== Chigirin affair ==
After his expulsion from University, Stefanovich teamed up with Leo Deutsch. In May 1876, he contacted prisoners from the Chigirin (Chyhyryn) district. The peasants in that area had demanded a fairer distribution of land, and were refusing to sign deeds that gave legally recognition to the current pattern of land ownership. In 1875, a group of peasants led by an army veteran named Foma Pryadko petitioned the tsar, wrongly believing that he secretly sympathised with them. In May 1875, the Russian authorities sent troops to suppress the protests. Two peasants were flogged to death, and hundreds were arrested and transported to Kiev.

Stefanovich contacted the Chigirin prisoners in Kiev in May 1876. He promised them that he would contact the tsar on their behalf. Stefanovich gained the prisoners' trust because he spoke Ukrainian fluently, and through a profound understanding of peasant folklore, as the hostile memoirist Lev Tikhomirov - an ex-revolutionary turned monarchist - acknowledged.

Stefanovich and Deutsch obtained a secret printing press and created a Secret Imperial Charter, supposedly issued by the tsar, which granted liberty to all of Chigirin's rural population and ordered that the land, including that belonging to the nobility, should be distributed equally. They also created the Statutes of the Secret Militia, which gave detailed instructions to the peasants to organise a secret, armed society to enforce the will of the 'tsar'.

Stefanovich and Deutsch recruited about a thousand peasants in the conspiracy, before careless talk alerted the authorities. Seventy-four peasants were arrested, along with Stefanovich, Deutsch, and a revolutionary named Ivan Bokhanovsky. The peasants now learnt that Stefanovich had not met the tsar, and the documents he had shown them were fake. According to Breshko-Breshkovskaya, "he expected the peasants who were in the same prison with him to be incensed ... but to his astonishment and joy, they welcomed him as friend and a leader... I now know that the peasants who were exiled to remote places in Siberia in connection with his case also considered him a very fine man and were anxious to meet him again."

Stefanovich was held in Kiev prison awaiting trial. A fellow revolutionary, Mikhail Frolenko, obtained a job as a prison warder and allowed Stefanovish, Deutsch and Bokhanovsky to walk out of the prison one evening, disguised as warders.

== Assassination of tsar ==
After his escape from prison in Kiew, Stefanovich hid out in St Petersburg for a month, then fled to Geneva. However, he decided to return to Russia after hearing about Alexander Soloviev's attempted assassination of the tsar. Stefanovich crossed the Russian border by train, travelling with Olga Lyubatovich, so that they could pose as man and wife.

The couple arrived as revolutionaries were on the point of splitting over the issue of whether to continue with propaganda work, or focus on killing the Tsar. Stefanovich tried energetically to prevent a split. He became a founder of Black Repartition - Lyubatovich described him as its 'leader'. Deutsch and Georgi Plekhanov were also members.

Stefanovich left Russian again in January 1880, but returned in 1881, intending to join Narodnaya Volya. However, after their successful assassination of Alexander II, most of its effective operatives had been arrested.

Stefanovich was arrested in Moscow in March 1882. In prison, he wrote a letter to Plekhanov, using invisible ink, in which he was scathing about the state of Narodnaya Volya. This was somehow intercepted by members of Narodnaya Volya, and created a scandal within the group.

Stefanovich was tried by Russian authorities in March 1883. The court accepted his statement that he was not a member of the Narodnaya Volya and gave him the comparatively light sentence of eight years hard labour in Kara. Stefanovich was released from prison in 1890, and took no further part in revolutionary activity.

Stefanovich died in Ukraine during World War I.

== Personality ==
Stefanovich appears to have been a naturally solitary individual. Sergei Kravchinsky, who hid out with Stefanovich in St Petersburg in 1878, said "He is an extremely reserved man, entirely concentrated in himself. He speaks little, in public meetings never. He always listens quite doubled up, with his head bent, as if asleep. He never enters into any theoretical discussions ... He is a man of action exclusively." Kravchinsky also wrote that "I never saw an uglier man. He had prominent cheek bones, a large mouth and a flat nose. But it was an attractive ugliness. Intelligence shone forth from his grey eyes."

There is a hint in Kravchinsky's account that Stefanovich and Leo Deutsch may have been gay lovers - "his most intimate friend is L., from whom he is never separated except when absolutely compelled by 'business,' and then they write long letters to each other every day, which they jealously keep, showing them to no one, affording thus a subject of everlasting ridicule among their friends." They arranged to share a room during their exile in Siberia in the 1880s, where Deutsch tried, but failed to persuade Stefanovich, whom he described as "unusually thoughtful and far-seeing" to become a Marxist.

Another revolutionary wrote that when Stefanovich and Deutsch were in Kiev in prison in 1877 - and facing a real possibility of being executed - they refused to escape unless they could both escape together, whereas Stefanovich was "terribly secretive and distrustful" with everybody but Deutsch, and had a reputation even among revolutionaries as a "fanatic".

Breshko-Breshkovskaya, who considered Stefanovich to be "one of the most sincere among the young revolutionists ... tall and broad with an open honest face...." thought that after the Chigirin affair "owing to the influence of his success and the recognition of his great abilities, Yakov gained too high an opinion of himself ... In Siberia ... as in Petersburg, he was generally disliked and condemned for his insincerity towards Narodnaya Volya." Lev Tikhomirov wrote that "he was an utter liar and lied even unnecessarily, as if for pleasure."
