= Catherine Breshkovsky =

Russian revolutionary (1844–1934)

- Екатерина Брешко-Брешковская
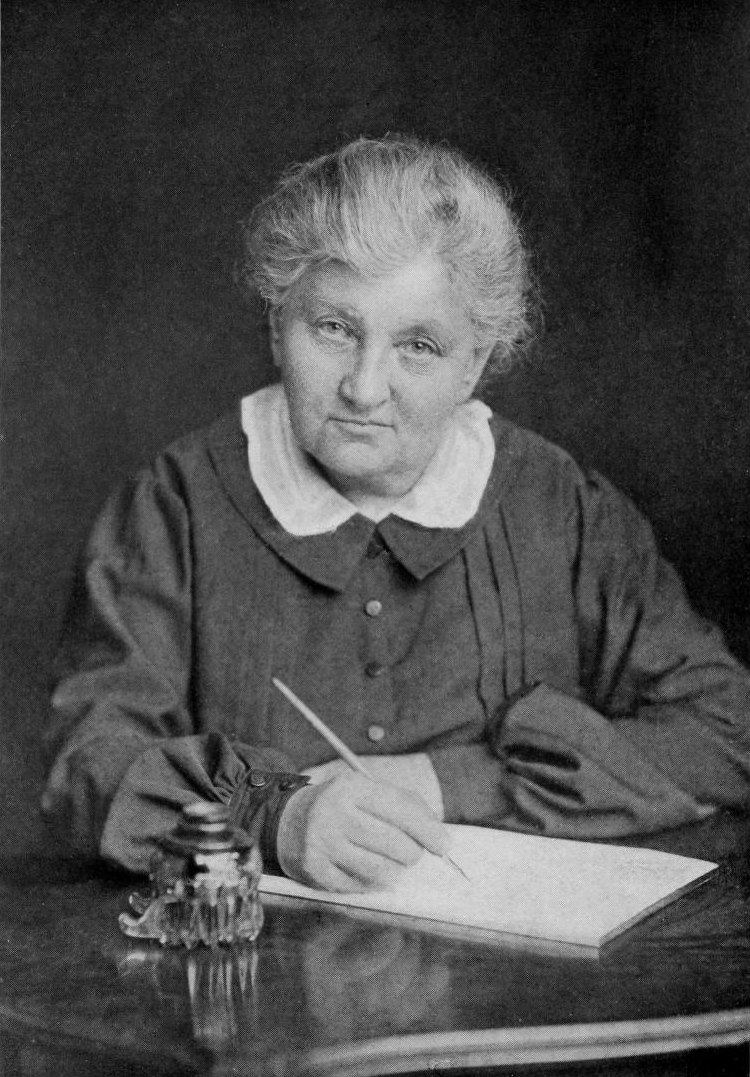
- Breshkovsky c. 1918
- Born: Yekaterina Konstantinovna Verigo; 25 January 1844; Ivanovo, Russia
- Died: 12 September 1934 (aged 90); Prague, Czechoslovakia
- Political party: Workers' Party for the Political Liberation of Russia; Socialist Revolutionary Party

Yekaterina Konstantinovna Breshko-Breshkovskaya (née Verigo; born 25 January [O.S. 13 January] 1844 – 12 September 1934), also known in English sources as Catherine Breshkovsky, was a major figure in the Russian socialist movement, a Narodnik, and later one of the founders of the Socialist Revolutionary Party. She has been described as Russia's first female political prisoner.

She spent over four decades in prison and Siberian exile for peaceful opposition to tsarism, acquiring, in her latter years, international stature as a political prisoner. Also popularly known as 'babushka', Breshkovsky has been described as the "grandmother of the Russian Revolution".

== Early life ==
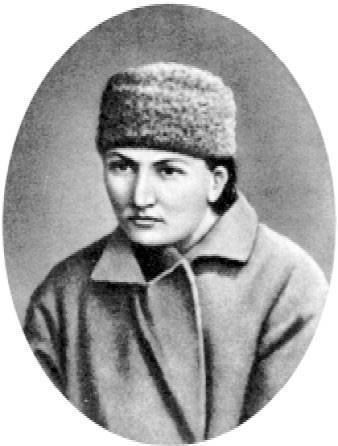
Breshkovsky in her youth

Born as Yekaterina Konstantinovna Verigo into the Russian nobility in the village of Ivanovo (present-day Nevelsky District), Breshkovsky grew up on the family estate in Chernigov Governorate, and was educated at home. Her father, Konstantin Verigo, owned serfs, but—according to her account—treated them well. In 1861, during the emancipation reform she helped her father free the serfs on the family estate then worked voluntarily to educate them. In 1868, she married Nikolay Petrovich Breshko-Breshkovsky, a landowner and country magistrate, but left him after two years and moved to Kiev where she formed a 'commune' with her sister Olga (who died young) and Maria Kolenkina. The trio followed the anarchist Mikhail Bakunin, when most of the revolutionaries in Kiev were in a group led by Pavel Axelrod, followers of the populist revolutionary Pyotr Lavrov. Axelrod introduced her to Andrei Zhelyabov, the peasant's son who organised the assassination of Emperor Alexander II in 1881.

In February 1874, she gave birth to a son, Nikolay Breshko-Breshkovsky, and left him to be brought up by relatives. She did not see him again until he was aged 22, and learnt that they had nothing in common. He later became a thriller writer, and Nazi sympathiser. In July 1874, she, Kolenkina and Yakov Stefanovich decided to 'go to the people' and set out with false passports, disguised as itinerants labourers, to settle in a village, where they tried to instill revolutionary ideas in the peasants. Warned of imminent arrest, Kolenkina returned to Kiev, while Breshkovsky and Stefanovich moved to another village, in Kherson province, where they came into contact with evangelical Protestants, known as the Stundists. Rejected by the Stundists, they moved on to Tulchyn. After Stefanovich returned to Kiev, Breshkovsky was arrested when a police officer checking her false passport noticed that she did not act as submissively as a peasant normally would.

== Imprisonment and exile ==
Breshkovsky was transported to St Petersburg, where, at 31, she was the oldest of 37 women held in the House of Preliminary Detention, all accused of political offences. Her defiant behaviour in the dock during the Trial of the 193, when she refused to recognise the court's authority and announced that she was proud to belong to 'the Russian socialistic and revolutionary party' led to her being convicted and sentenced to five years katorga (penal labour), whereas other female defendants, including the future regicide Sophia Perovskaya, were acquitted.

She was, reputedly, the first woman in Russia sentenced to katorga for a political offence, which earned her the respect of other revolutionaries. Her friend, Maria Kolenkina, was so incensed that she planned to kill the man who prosecuted Breshkovsky, but was foiled. Sergei Kravchinsky described her as "passionate and prophetic", but Perovskaya reportedly treated her "very coldly", finding her "extreme".

In 1879, Breshkovsky's sentence was commuted to exile in the Transbaikal region of Siberia. In 1881, she escaped, but was recaptured and sentenced to another four years katorga in the mines in Kara katorga, and to 40 lashes. but the local authorities did not dare carry out the flogging, for fear of reprisals. She was exiled again to Seleginsk village, in Transbaikal where the American journalist and explorer George Kennan interviewed her in 1885. He wrote:

She was a lady perhaps 35 years of age (actually 41) with a strong, intelligent, but not handsome face, a frank unreserved manner and sympathies that seemed to be warm, impulsive, and generous. Her face bore traces of much suffering, and her thick, dark wavy hair, which had been cut in prison at the mines, was streaked here and there with grey... Almost the last words that she said to me were: "Mr Kennan, we may die in exile, and our children may die in exile, and our children's children may die in exile, but something will come of it at last."

Kennan was later quoted as saying: "All my standards of courage, of fortitude, and of heroic self-sacrifice have been raised for all time, and raised by the hand of a woman".

== Socialist Revolutionary Party ==
Breshkovsky was released in 1896, after 22 years in prison or exile, under an amnesty, marking the coronation of the Nicholas II, the last emperor of Russia. With some difficulty, she made contact with revolutionaries still at large, most of whom were many years younger than her. The most important was Grigory Gershuni, who was 26 years her junior. The two of them led a revival of the populist movement in Minsk, in 1897, where "Breshkovskaya had a large following among the youth of the Minsk gymnasia; Gershuni led another group which debated tactical questions."

This was one of several groups brought together in 1901 to form the Socialist-Revolutionary Party. She and Gershuni then spent two years travelling illegally around Russia, organising the new party. "There existed a kind of division of labour between them: Breshkovskaya, like a 'Holy Ghost of the Revolution' flitted about the country, proselytising and inciting everywhere the revolutionary temper of the youth; Gershuni usually followed in her tracks and turned to practical account the enthusiasm she aroused." When Gershuni was arrested, in May 1903, she escaped abroad via Romania, to Geneva.

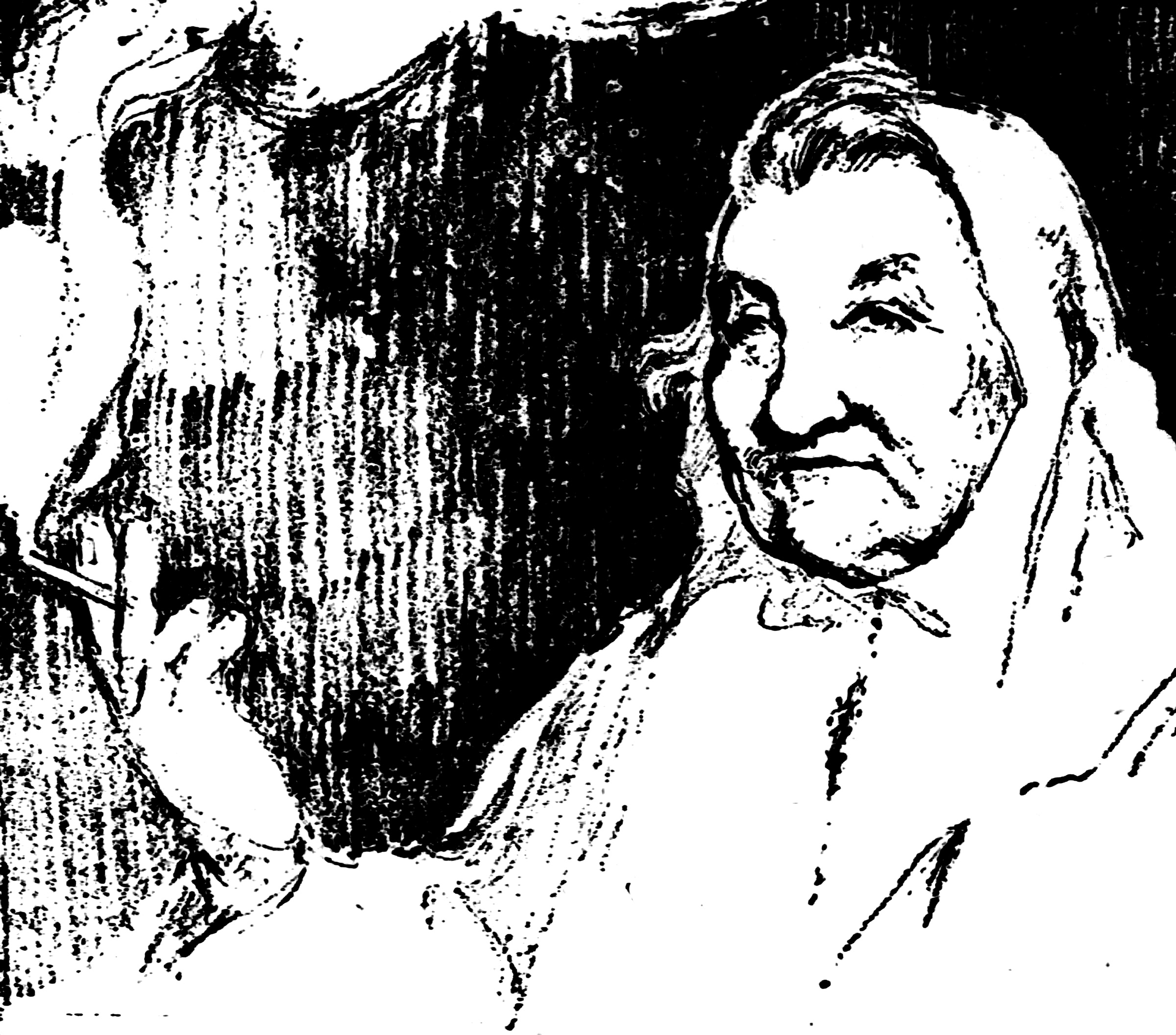
Breshkovsky as sketched by Marguerite Martyn of the St. Louis Post-Dispatch in 1919

== U.S. tour ==
In 1904, Breshkovsky travelled to the U.S., where her name was well known because of George Kennan's book. The trip turned her into a celebrity. In December 1904, nearly 3,000 people came to a meeting in Boston, organised to welcome her. According to a contemporary report "When the 'Grand Old Lady' got up to speak, the great audience rose en masse. Handkerchiefs waved, hats were flung into the air, words of affection in five languages were rained upon her." She also visited New York and Chicago, and was befriended by feminists such as Alice Stone Blackwell, Isabel Barrows and Helena Dudley. It was during this trip that she was given the nickname 'Babushka', the grandmother of the Revolution. She raised about $10,000 for the Socialist Revolutionary Party.

== Second arrest and exile ==
Breshkovsky returned to Russia in time for the outbreak of the 1905 Revolution. In August, the police spy Yevno Azef promised to lead the police to her, and travelled to Saratov with a senior officer, but failed to locate her. She was at large until 1908, when Azef again betrayed her to the police and she was interned in the Peter and Paul Fortress. Hearing of her arrest, Isabel Barrows sailed to Russia to plead for her release, and succeeded in persuading Nikolay Breshko-Breshkovsky to visit his mother in prison, despite his hostility to her beliefs. In 1910, she was sentenced to exile for life in Siberia, and deported to a village by the Lena River where she was kept under constant supervision.

In November 1913 now almost 70 years old, she attempted an escape that involved a journey by horseback of more than 620 miles to Irkutsk, but was recaptured only seven miles outside the city. She was held in solitary confinement in Irkutsk prison for two years, then deported to Yakutsk, close to the Arctic Circle, but after protests from her American sympathisers, was returned to Irkutsk.

== After the Revolution ==
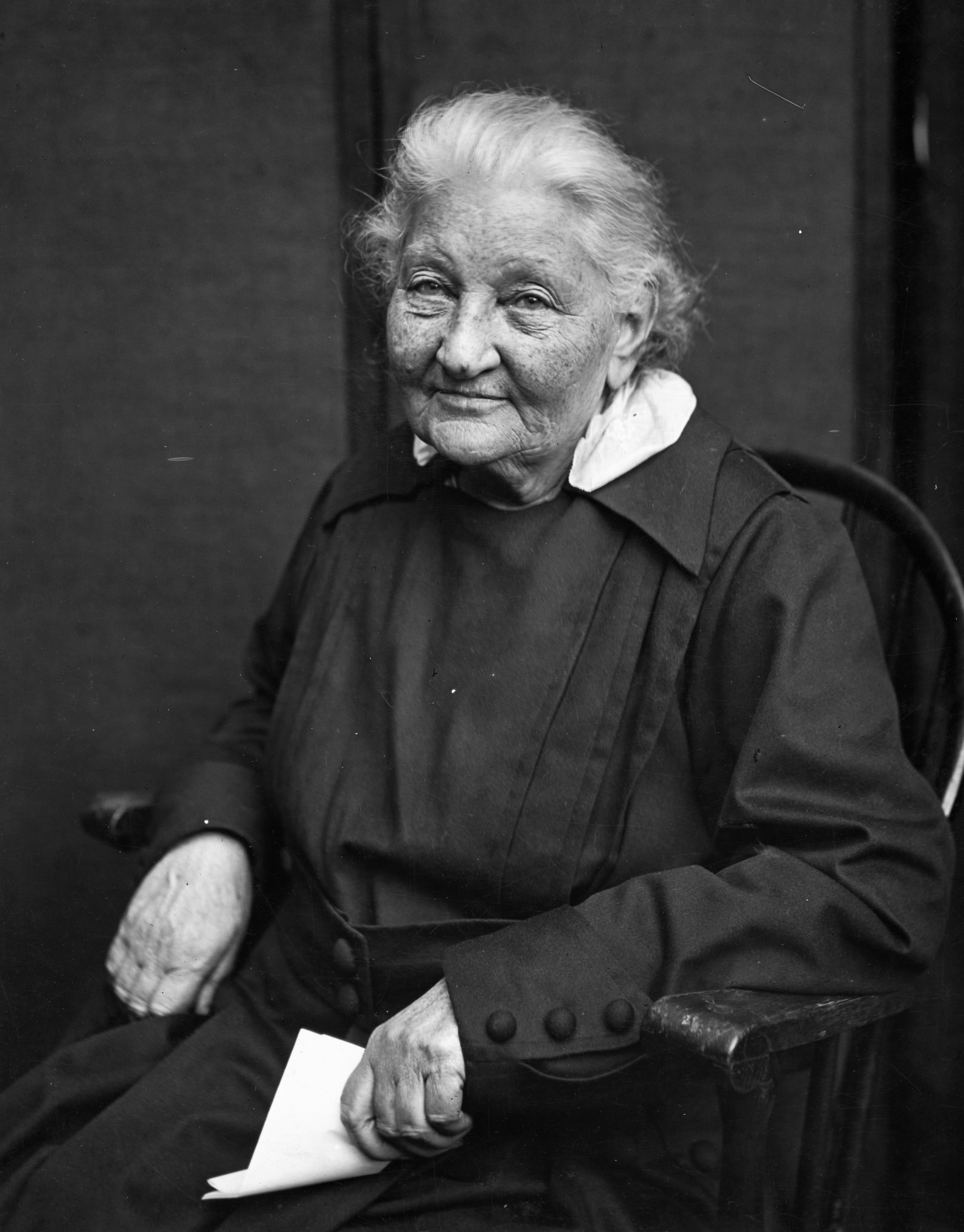
Breshkovsky in New York City, early 1919

One of the first acts of the Provisional Government that took office after the February Revolution of 1917 was to send Breshkovsky a special invitation to return to Petrograd, where she was personally welcomed by the Minister of Justice, and future Prime Minister, Alexander Kerensky, and by a huge crowd. Breshkovsky was elected in October 1917 to the Pre-Parliament, ahead of a nationwide election to a Constituent Assembly, and as its oldest member was appointed to chair its first meeting. By now, she was a legendary figure in Russia. The future Nobel prize winning writer Ivan Bunin overheard peasants talking about her in the summer of 1917. One said:

She's a soothsayer, that's for sure. The word on her is that she's been predicting all these goings-on for the past fifty years. But God help us, she's really beastly looking: fat, angry, with very small penetrating eyes—I once saw her portrait in a feuilleton. She was chained in a stockade for 42 years, but they couldn't break her. She was never left alone day or night, but they couldn't break her back: even in the stockade she managed to get hold of a million rubles! Now she's buying people for support, promising to give them land and not to draft them for war...

Actually, far from wanting to spare peasants from being called up for military service, she advocated continuing the war with Germany, and was one of the most committed and high-profile supporters of the Kerensky government. When it was overthrown in November by the Bolsheviks, she drafted an appeal to the Czechoslovak Legion to intervene to reinstate Kerensky by force. Late in 1918, she travelled via Vladivostok to the U.S., to appeal to the government to send 50,000 troops to support the anti-Bolshevik forces in the Russian Civil War. Later she moved to Paris, then in 1924 to Czechoslovakia, where she shared her final exile with Maria Kolenkina, a friendship that spanned more than 50 years.
