= Going to the People =

1874 Russian populist movement

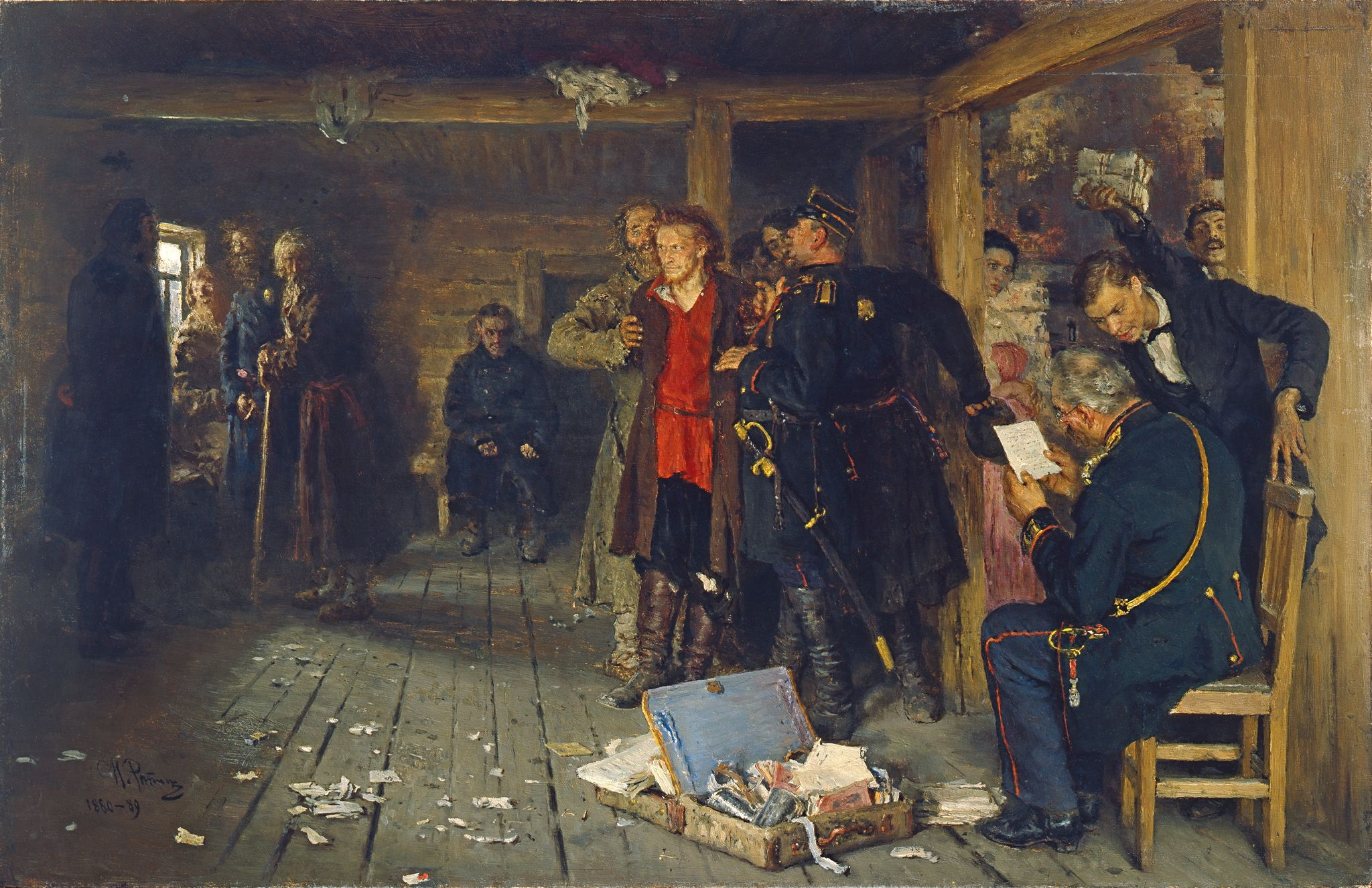
- Arrest of a Propagandist, painting by Ilya Repin (1892)
- Native name: Хождение в народ
- Date: 1874
- Location: Russia
- Type: Mass movement
- Motive: Populism
- Participants: Narodnik students
- Outcome: Movement suppressed, participants arrested
- Arrests: 717
- Suspects: 1,611
- Accused: 525

Going to the People (Note: Russian: Хождение в народ, romanized: Hoždenije v narod, IPA: [xɐʐˈdʲenʲɪje‿v‿nɐˈrot]) was a populist movement in the Russian Empire. It was largely inspired by the work of Russian theorists such as Mikhail Bakunin and Pyotr Lavrov, who advocated that groups of dedicated revolutionaries could inspire a mass movement to overthrow the ruling class, especially as it concerned the peasantry. The anarchist Peter Kropotkin called the experience "the mad summer of 1874".

== History ==
=== Background ===
Narodnichestvo (Russian populism) first took root in Russia following the emancipation reform of 1861, when an ideology of national reconciliation between antagonistic social classes began to take hold among Russian intellectuals, who turned their attention to the newly emancipated peasantry. The slogan "To the People!" was first expounded by the "father of Russian socialism" Alexander Herzen, in an 1861 issue of his newspaper Kolokol, following the closure of Saint Petersburg University in response to growing student unrest. This came during a rising wave of populism in Russia, during which Narodniks urged the unoccupied students to "go to the people", i.e. to "live among them, merge with them and fight for their interests."

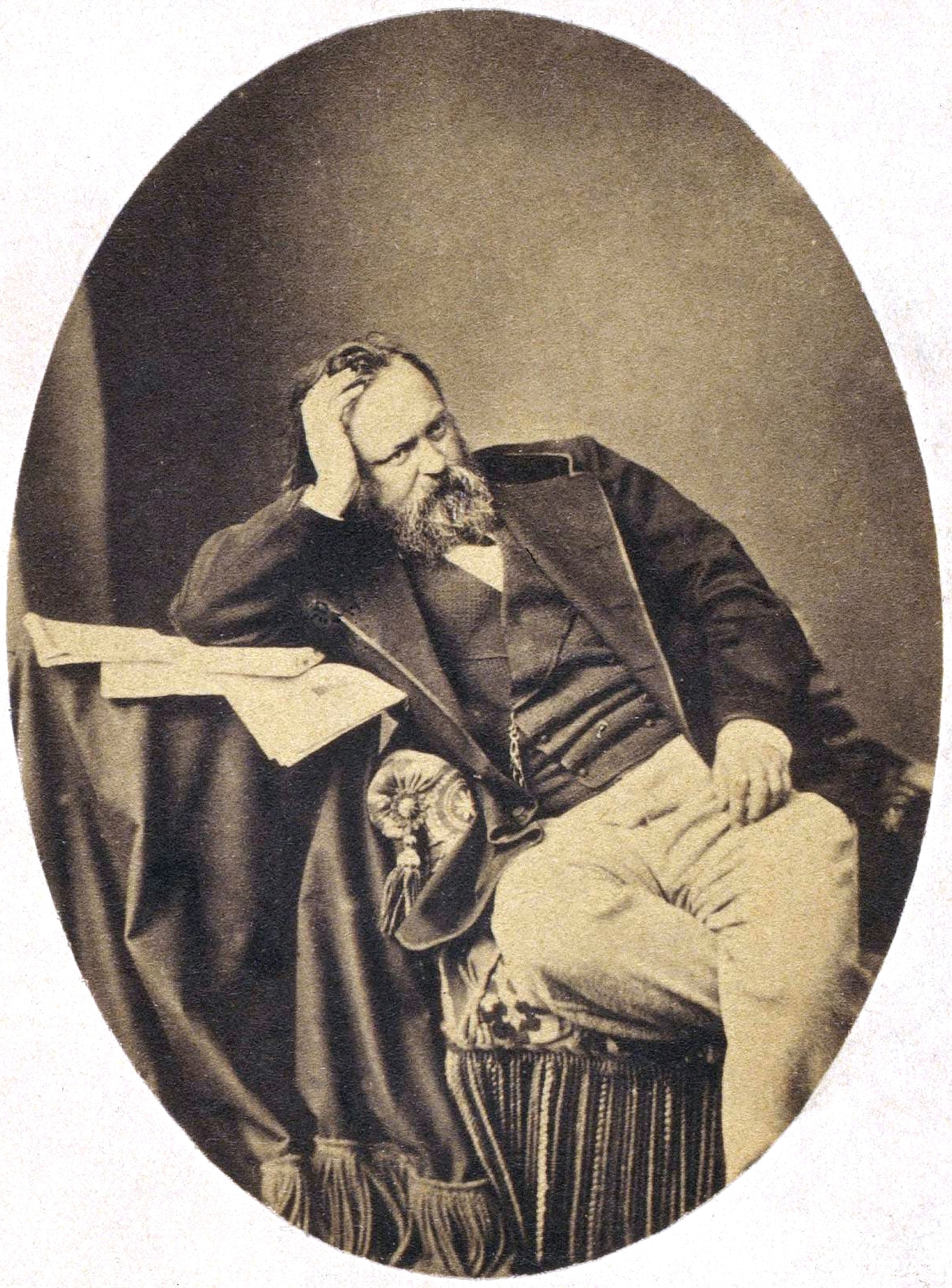
Alexander Herzen, founder of the Russian populist movement

Trips into the provinces were planned by students throughout the 1860s, but disagreements on the objective of such a movement led to a factional schism among Russian students in Switzerland. Followers of Pyotr Lavrov advocated for a long period of peaceful propaganda among the peasantry, whereas the followers of Mikhail Bakunin believed in the necessity of active revolutionary agitation. The dispute was carried into Russia with the publication of Lavrov's newspaper Forward! and Bakunin's book Statism and Anarchy. The tamer ideology of the Lavrovists proved less popular than Bakunin's revolutionary anarchism, with the Circle of Tchaikovsky even switching its sympathies from the former to the latter, under the leadership of Peter Kropotkin. With the goal of social revolution in mind, the Circle dedicated themselves to "fostering an intelligentsia from among the people", setting out to establish student cadres that would "go out to the people" in order to spread education and revolutionary propaganda. The arrest of leading members of the Circle, including Kropotkin, only accelerated preparations for "going to the people".

The Lavrovists argued that anyone preparing to partake in the movement would need to undergo rigorous education, before they could themselves propagandise and indoctrinate the peasantry to their own ideas. But the buntars dismissed this idea, believing that the peasants themselves needed no education on populist ideals, as they already traditionally held to an egalitarian and anti-authoritarian philosophy. The buntars held that uprisings would themselves have an educational effect, as even small and failed rebellions would accumulate towards a generalised revolution.

Despite the disagreements on militancy between the two factions, they were able to come together on a number of issues, including that the coming revolution would necessitate an economic transformation of society, and that an effective propagandist would need to "completely identify [themself] with the common people" by adopting their customs. They also agreed on the need for students to take up a manual trade which would help them "rub off civilization", with students setting up workshops around the country to train them in a number of different skills. By the 1870s, radical propaganda was being circulated widely within self-education circles and student communes, igniting a "youth revolution", during which young people were inspired "to resolve all (of Russia's) cursed questions which gave humanity no respite."

=== Campaign ===
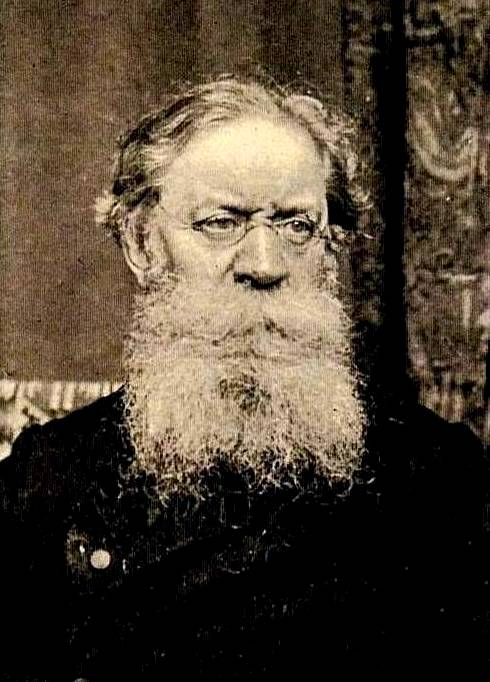
Pyotr Lavrov, thought leader of the gradualist faction

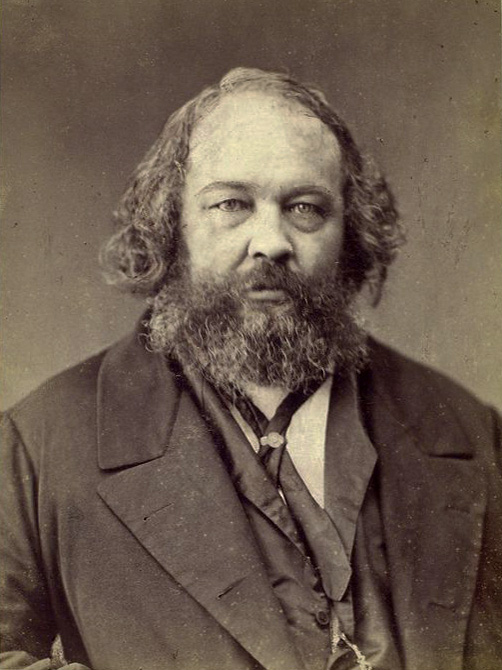
Mikhail Bakunin, thought leader of the revolutionary faction

In their excitement to "go to the people", many students left university before they had even graduated or symbolically destroyed their certificates, in a process accelerated by the outbreak of famine in the Volga region. By the spring of 1874, there was a mass exodus of students from Moscow and Saint Petersburg. Approximately 2,000 to 4,000 students, some of whom were offspring of the nobility, traveled to rural parts of the empire in order to live among the peasants and "prepare them for their future political role." Many of these youths had never before visited the villages of Russia, but sought to adopt their manner of dress and take up jobs as manual laborers as a way of engaging the population. The movement notably involved many women such as Catherine Breshkovsky, who participated alongside men as propagandists.

To many of its participants, the movement took on a religious character, in which they acted as populist missionaries of a "new faith", adopting elements of Biblical scripture as a way of spurring the masses towards revolution. This led the Ukrainian historian Avrahm Yarmolinsky to characterize the movement as a "children's crusade", due to the "ignorance and naivete" of the enthusiastic student participants. Orlando Figes further described the campaign as a "pilgrimage", in which the guilt-driven students saw themselves as paying off a debt to the peasantry, one the students had incurred through their privileged upbringing.

The movement itself was a spontaneous self-organized affair, with the only attempts at centralizing leadership ending up stillborn. The decentralized groups involved acted autonomously, with the only point of connection being a Moscow-based printing press that produced fake passports and propaganda pamphlets, or the various quarters used by the students for shelter and resupply. The movement spread rapidly throughout the country, with authorities reporting that populist propagandists were active in over three-quarters of Russian provinces. The Don and Volga regions became main locations for agitation, due to their history as the centers of Stenka Razin's and Yemelyan Pugachev's rebellions respectively. The movement also penetrated Ukraine, students attempted to organize fugitives hiding in the Urals, while others propagandized amongst the Old Believers. The only region that remained untouched by the movement was Siberia, due to its large non-Russian population.

Divisions in the movement between the Lavrovists and the buntars continued, with the former planning to intellectually educate the peasants and the latter planning to play on the emotions of the peasantry to foment revolt. But both largely handed out pamphlets detailing the same objectives: "land to the peasants, mills and factories to the workers, freedom and equality for all." More well-off participants also found themselves unable to deal with the hardships of the lifestyle, quickly returning to the cities after their enthusiasm for the movement wore off. Those who did continue were met with further difficulties, being turned away from possible lodgings or failing to properly abide by local customs.

They found the people often unreceptive to their revolutionary message, either due to widespread illiteracy or disinterest in the ideas presented to them. While older peasants responded well to the concepts of social anarchism, younger ones were more driven by a sense of rugged individualism and a desire to hold private property. Peasants still held out hope for land redistribution, but this hope was placed in the initiatives of Alexander II and the promises of military service. Some peasants even responded with anger when populists advocated overthrowing the Tsarist autocracy.

The students that had previously held up the artel as a model for socialism found that it was actually closer to a privately held company than a workers' cooperative, the workers at which were left too tired after the workday to be receptive to revolutionary propaganda. Attempts to propagandize the Old Believers were held back by their prejudices, while peasants of the Volga were discovered to have profited from the emancipation edict and were thus unreceptive to subversive ideas. The buntars were also largely unsuccessful in stirring up revolt, with peasants either unwilling, unequipped or unorganized enough to do so, while those that traveled to the Urals did not find any of the rumored fugitives that they intended to organize into a revolutionary armed force.

Some peasants even turned over their "exotic urban visitors" to government authorities, although this was a rare occurrence. Most state repression came because the propagandists themselves had failed to take the necessary precautions to escape government surveillance and their premises were quickly raided by police. It was ultimately a failure, and by the autumn of 1874, more than a thousand arrests had been made. They failed to inspire "unrest even on a local scale" or to establish local footholds for future activities, with perhaps only a few dozen converts won at the cost of hundreds arrested. Of those arrested, many spent three to four years imprisoned, until the Governing Senate eventually brought them to court in the 1877.

=== Second wave ===
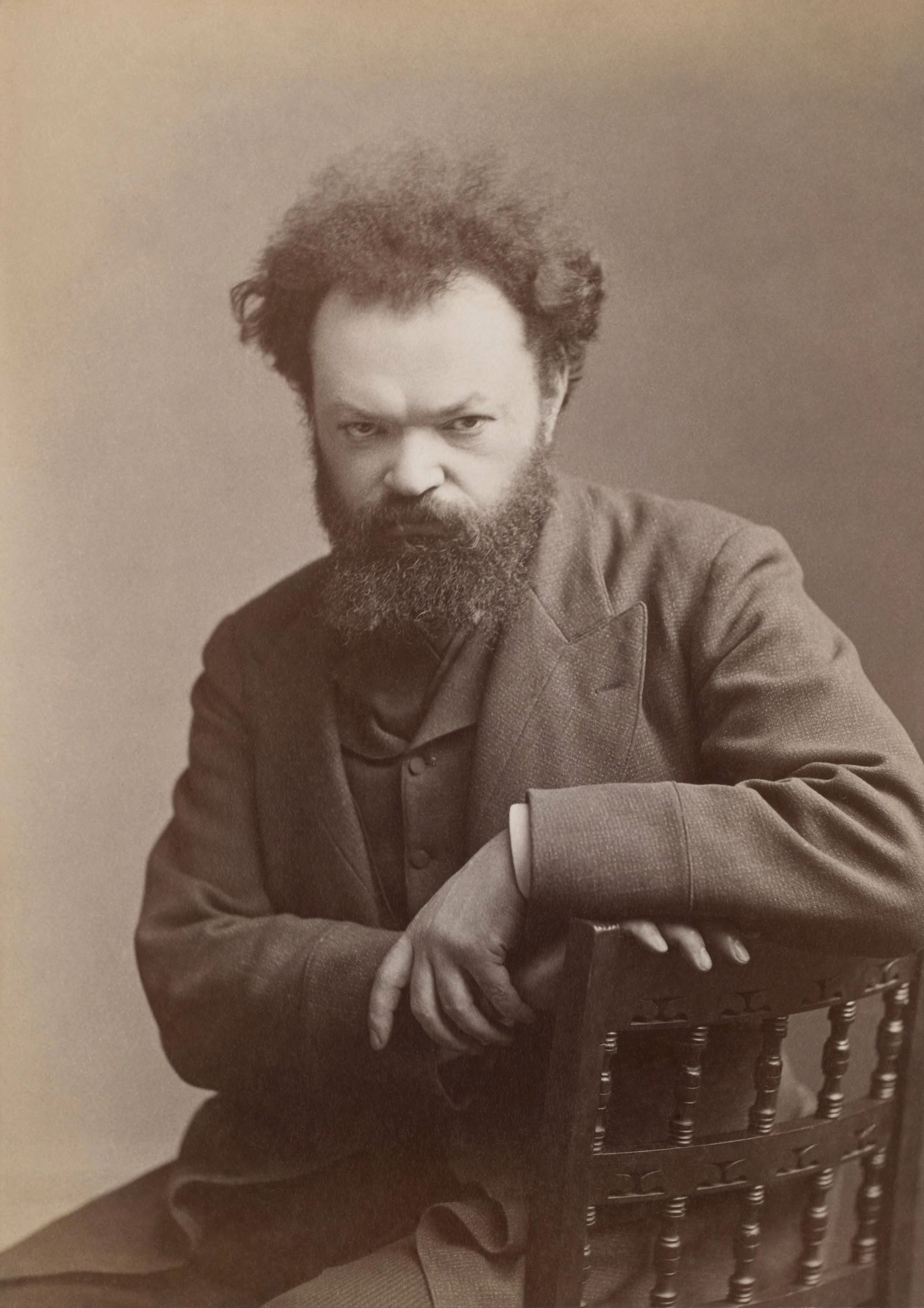
Sergey Stepnyak-Kravchinsky, prominent member of the revolutionary faction

Some participants openly declared that if state repression had not fallen on them, then they naturally would have become disillusioned and lose their revolutionary fervor themselves, but the arrests had instead strengthened much of their resolve. Those who continued on included Sergey Stepnyak-Kravchinsky who fled abroad where he planned to return and continue his populist agitation, Catherine Breshkovsky who was arrested and Yakov Stefanovich who evaded the police.

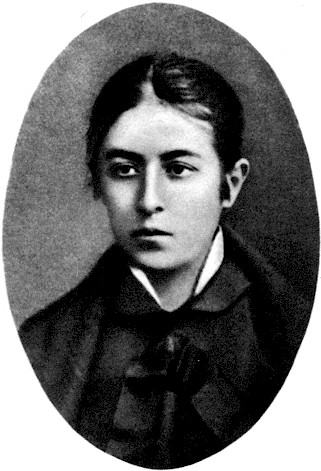
Vera Figner, founder of the Moscow Circle

While the peasantry was largely unmoved by the movement, it had won new converts from the intelligentsia, who made an aborted attempt at a second round of propaganda the following year. The Circle of Tchaikovsky was succeeded by the Moscow Circle, made up of a young women's group around Vera Figner and a number of Georgian nationalists that had found common cause with Russian revolutionaries. By February 1875, the Circle had established the All-Russian Social-Revolutionary Organization, intended as an organ to unite all the disparate revolutionary elements within it and organized along non-hierarchical lines with a rotating executive committee. In a synthesis of both Lavrov and Bakunin's ideas, the organization planned to establish decentralized groups that would both propagandize the masses and carry out acts of terrorism against the ruling classes of Russia. Breaking from the old focus on the peasantry, the Organization focused its own activities on the urban working classes. Women began work in the factories, where they spoke to their fellow workers and distributed pamphlets, but were quickly identified by their employers and forced out. The organization was suppressed by August 1875, with about a third of its membership being arrested.

Other former participants in the movement also lost their faith in the revolutionary potential of the peasantry and shifted their focus to the urban working class. In Odessa, one Lavrovist founded the South Russian Workers' Union, which for its short existence spread socialist ideas among the city's factory workers and even organized strikes, the first organization of its kind to do so in Russia. Nevertheless, the peasantry remained at the center of revolutionary focus in the country, with a renewed attempt by populists to "go to the people" in the spring of 1875, which also proved a failure, leading to widespread disillusionment with the Lavrovist methods of peaceful propaganda. The majority of the movement moved towards the buntar position, with Sergey Stepnyak-Kravchinsky criticising Lavrov for his reformism and declaring that "one mutinous act, even if unsuccessful, would achieve more than a decade of indoctrination".

In Ukraine, the ranks of the buntars swelled with a number of "illegals", who remained out of the reach of the Russian authorities. The buntars began agitating in Korsun, where they planned to incite the local peasants to expropriate the land they worked and to launch an armed uprising against the Russian authorities, gaining a foothold there by the spring of 1876. But their plans did not materialize and after one of their members turned informant they were forced to abandon Korsun and scatter. Some of these buntars were able to gain a foothold in Chyhyryn, where the lower-class peasants and their landlords had come into conflict over land rights. Claiming to act on behalf of Alexander II, the buntars led by Yakov Stefanovich intervened on the side of the peasant dusheviks in order to redistribute land to them. Under the leadership of Stefanovich, self-styled as "Commissar Dmytro Naido", they formed peasant combat druzhinas with elected atamans and soviets. The organisation grew to over one thousand members and existed for nine months until its discovery by the police in September 1877, after which its leading members were arrested.

=== Intellectual reaction ===
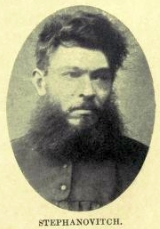
Yakov Stefanovich, leader of the Ukrainian buntars

By this time, Russian anarchists in exile in Geneva had begun publication of The Worker monthly newspaper, but it only gained a limited readership during its short-lived existence. From London, Lavrov's bi-weekly newspaper Forward! was much more widely circulated, publishing reports on the socialist movement both in Russia and internationally. The conflict between the two factions continued in print, with Forward! publishing scathing critiques of anarchism, focused on the anarchists' insistence on the imminence of revolution in Russia, their practice of direct action and their appeals to "elemental passions". Lavrov also analyzed the differences between the rise of socialism in the West, characterized by its resistance to capitalism, and its rise in Russia, where it was a movement driven by ethics. He therefore insisted on the necessity of a "revolutionary morality" to guide Russian socialists in the overturn of the existing system and continued to call for a process of peaceful indoctrination in order to build revolutionary capacity.

Lavrov called for intellectuals to build a workers' and peasants' army, but insisted on it being self-managed, himself opposed to the dictatorship of a revolutionary minority, which he believed would institute a regime of state capitalism in the name of socialism. Lavrov aimed this critique at the nascent Russian Blanquist tendency led by Pyotr Tkachev, who had likewise criticised Lavrov as a "preacher of peaceful progress" that was unnecessarily delaying the revolution. In the ensuing debate, Lavrov denounced Tkachev as an "irresponsible demagogue", with Friedrich Engels even joining in on the side of Lavrov. Tkachev and the Blanquists established their own journal Tocsin, in which they attacked Lavrovism for its gradualist stance and called for the seizure of power by a "morally and intellectually advanced" elite, which would consolidate control over the state, rather than abolishing it like the anarchists. Tkachev believed that the masses were incapable of liberating themselves and that, following the seizure of power, they would need to be re-educated before the establishment of socialism and the "withering away of the state". The Lavrovists and anarchists alike abhorred Tkachev's authoritarian and anti-democratic schema for revolution, with Sergey Stepnyak-Kravchinsky denouncing it as "nothing but vileness and political revolution". Despite the limited circulation of the journal, Tkachev's ideas eventually found a dedicated following among Russian Marxists, including one Vladimir Ilyich Ulyanov.

=== Trials and sentencing ===
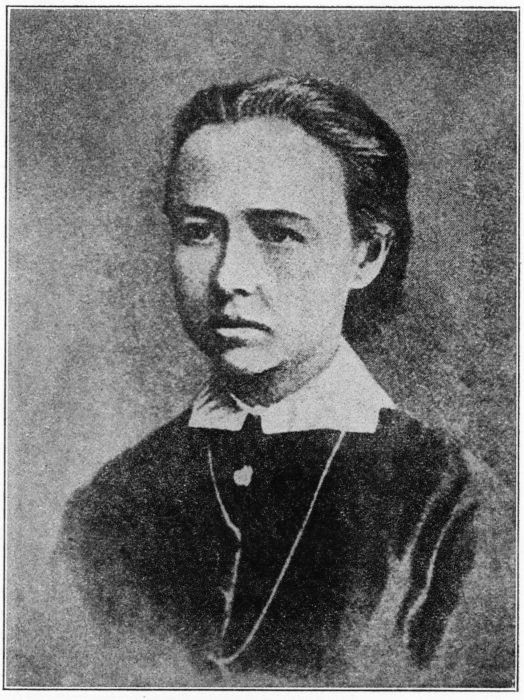
Sophia Perovskaya, acquitted defendant in the Trial of the 193 and founding member of Land and Liberty.

The Moscow Circle was tried in March 1877, charged with conspiracy to overthrow the existing order and incitement to revolt. The fifty defendants, including Pyotr Alexeyev, defended themselves on the grounds of merely agitating for the workers' right to the fruits of their labor, in speeches that were excised from the courts' records. The Circle were sentenced to hard labor in Siberia, which earned them even greater sympathy from the public, eventually resulting in a successful appeal for their release.

Following a brief trial against the South Russian Workers' Union, in October 1877, the "case of Revolutionary Propaganda in the Empire" was initiated against the campaign's participants. Some of the defendants had only a tenuous connection to the populist movement, the trial ironically resulting in them being inducted into the movement, with one historian even calling it a "conference of activists arranged by and at the expense of the government". The spokesperson for the 193 defendants, who referred to themselves as the "Socialist Revolutionary Party", declared their intention to establish a "free union of autonomous communes" through a popular uprising against the state and attacked the Senate as having organised a show trial. In the end, 90 of the defendants, including Sophia Perovskaya, were acquitted. The others were sentenced to a variety of different punishments, from five days' to ten years' imprisonment, 28 of whom were sentenced to hard labor. Requests by the court to commute the sentences of 62 convicts were rejected by Alexander II, who even lengthened the sentences of a dozen participants.

Logo of Land and Liberty, the populist organization founded in the wake of the campaign

The Senate had attempted to use the show trials to engender public opinion against the revolutionaries, but it had the opposite effect, as the defendants used their trials as a platform to espouse their populist ideas. Following their guilty verdict, one group of the convicts signed a statement reaffirming their commitment to the revolutionary populist cause and encouraged their still-free comrades to continue the struggle against the Tsarist autocracy, resulting in the establishment of the Land and Liberty organisation by populists such as Sergey Stepnyak-Kravchinsky, Sophia Perovskaya and Mark Natanson.

== Legacy ==
Ivan Turgenev's novel Virgin Soil was inspired directly by the "Going to the People" campaign, drawing from the revolutionary elements he had observed at that time. The campaign also caused the author Leo Tolstoy to experience a moral crisis, during which he renounced the Russian Orthodox Church as an oppressive institution, instead placing his faith in the peasantry. Peasant collectivism became, to Tolstoy, "my monastery, the church where I escaped and found refuge from all the anxieties, the doubts and temptations of my life."

The campaign later went on to inspire the Ballets Russes, with its founder Sergei Diaghilev declaring its intellectual origins to be "in objects of utility (domestic implements in the country districts), in the painting on the sleighs, in the designs and the colours of peasant dresses, or the carving around a window frame, we found our motifs, and on this foundation we built." Inspired by the campaign, the Russian ethnographers Yury Melgunov and Evgenia Linyova had recorded peasant songs, using the scientific method to transcribe the polyphonic harmonies displayed by the singers. Their work directly influenced the composer Igor Stravinsky, particularly in The Firebird, Petrushka and The Rite of Spring.

== See also ==
- Government reforms of Alexander II of Russia
- Pochvennichestvo
- Narodism
- Mass line

== Bibliography ==
- Berlin, Isaiah (7 March 2013). Russian Thinkers. Penguin Books Limited. ISBN 978-0-14-139317-9.
- Bromley, Jonathan (2002). Russia 1848-1917. Heinemann. ISBN 978-0-435-32718-7.
- Eklof, Ben; Saburova, Tatiana (2017). A Generation of Revolutionaries: Nikolai Charushin and Russian Populism from the Great Reforms to Perestroika. Bloomington: Indiana University Press. ISBN 978-0-253-03125-9. OCLC 1100234812.
- Figes, Orlando (2002). Natasha's Dance: A Cultural History of Russia. New York: Henry Holt and Company. ISBN 0-8050-5783-8. OCLC 265001330.
- Lane, A. T. (1995). Biographical Dictionary of European Labor Leaders. Greenwood Publishing Group. ISBN 978-0-313-29900-1.
- Schapiro, Leonard (1982) [1978]. Turgenev, His Life and Times. Harvard University Press. ISBN 978-0-674-91297-7.
- Terras, Victor (1985). Handbook of Russian Literature. Yale University Press. ISBN 978-0-300-04868-1.
- Todes, Daniel P. (15 October 2014). Ivan Pavlov: A Russian Life in Science. Oxford University Press. ISBN 978-0-19-939444-9.
- Yarmolinsky, Avrahm (2014) [1956]. "The Children's Crusade". Road to Revolution: A Century of Russian Radicalism. Princeton, New Jersey: Princeton University Press. pp. 182–211. ISBN 978-0691610412. OCLC 890439998.
