= Serebryakov =

Serebryakov or Serebriakov (Russian: Серебряков) is a Russian masculine surname originating from the word serebryak, meaning silversmith; its feminine counterpart is Serebryakova or Serebriakova. Notable persons with the surname include:

- Aleksei Serebryakov (disambiguation), multiple persons
- Alexander Serebryakov (born 1987), Russian cyclist
- Boris Serebryakov (1941–1971), Soviet serial killer
- Daria Serebriakova (born 1995), Russian badminton player
- Esper Serebryakov (1854–1921), director of the Russian-language newspaper Nakanune
- Evgeny Serebryakov, Russian Hacker
- Galina Serebryakova (1905–1980), Polish-Russian writer
- I. D. Serebryakov (1917–1998), Russian lexicographer and translator
- Lazar Serebryakov (1795–1862), Russian admiral
- Leonid Serebryakov (1890–1937), Soviet politician
- Maria Serebriakova (born 1965), Russian artist
- Nikolay Serebryakov (1928–2005), Soviet and Russian director of animated films
- Pavel Serebryakov (1909–1977), Russian pianist
- Zinaida Serebriakova (1884–1967), Russian and French painter

== Fictional characters ==
- Alexander Serebryakov, fictional university professor in Anton Chekhov's play Uncle Vanya
- Viktoriya Ivanovna Serebryakov, fictional first lieutenant in the light novel series The Saga of Tanya the Evil
