= Society of Friends of Russian Freedom =

Western anti-Tsarist organization

The official organ of the Society of Friends of Russian Freedom was the monthly newsletter Free Russia.

The Society of Friends of Russian Freedom was an organization of British and American political activists and reformers who supported the Russian opposition movement against Tsarist autocracy, broadly defined at the end of the 19th and the beginning of the 20th century.

== English society ==
The English Society of Friends of Russian Freedom was founded in April 1890.

In 1892, the executive committee of the society included William Pollard Byles, Leonard Trelawny Hobhouse, Mrs. Edwin Human, Mrs. Oharies Mallet, Marjory Pease and Edward R. Pease, G. H. Perris, J. Allonson Ploton, Herbert Rix, George Standring, Adolphs Smith, Robert Spence Watson, Ethel Lilian Voynich and Wilfrid Voynich, and William W. Mackenzie.

From 1890 to 1914 Society published Free Russia, a monthly newsletter edited by Sergei Stepniak and later Felix Volkhovsky.

== American society ==
=== Formation ===
The Society of American Friends of Russian Freedom (SAFRF) was founded in April 1891 in Boston at the Russian émigré Stepniak-Kravchinskii instigation. The Society formed by the local old-time reformers and former abolitionists and also their children, who were active in various social movements. The most notable persons of the SAFRF were Thomas Wentworth Higginson, Julia Ward Howe, Mark Twain, John Greenleaf Whittier, and James Russell Lowell. Besides them, the Society received an enthusiastic response from Francis Jackson Garrison, the son of the famous abolitionist William Lloyd Garrison and the author and activist from Valley Falls, Lillie Wyman.

According to F.F. Travis, they advised Stepniak "on how to proceed" with the Society and introduced him to the circle of Bostonian reformers. Higginson, Howe, Wyman, Francis Garrison, and Stepniak drafted the appeal of the SAFRF, "To the Friends of Russian Freedom," which was issued on April 14, 1891. The appeal signed 37 prominent Americans.

From July 1891 till July 1894 the SAFRF published the monthly magazine Free Russia.

=== Members ===
The total number of members of the SAFRF was 164 in 1891 and 142 in 1892. The most active members of the SAFRF were Francis Garrison as the treasurer, Edmund Noble as the secretary and editor of Free Russia, and Lazar Goldenberg as the publisher of the magazine. The circulation of the periodical did not exceed 3000 copies.

The SAFRF was unable to generate critical mass in support of the "Russian cause" and in May 1894 the Executive Committee decided to suspend the American edition Free Russia. The decision was made public in the June-July edition of the paper.

=== Resurrection ===
In 1903 the suffragist activist Alice Stone Blackwell reorganized the SAFRF. An Indiana politician William Dudley Foulke became president. The society organized the propagandist campaign of the Russian émigré Breshko-Breskovskaia in 1904-1905 in the USA. George Kennan, revealed in the New York Times on 24 March 1917 that Jacob Schiff of Kuhn, Loeb Bank on Wall Street financed Russian revolutionaries through this organization. Schiff had been financing Russian revolutionaries since 1905.
