= Road to Revolution =

Road to Revolution may refer to:

- Road to Revolution: A Century of Russian Radicalism, a 1957 history book by Avrahm Yarmolinsky
- Road to Revolution: Live at Milton Keynes, a 2008 compilation of live recordings by American rock band Linkin Park
- The Road to Revolution: Scotland under Charles I, 1625–37, a 1985 history book by Maurice Lee, Jr.
