= Circle of Tchaikovsky =

Russian literary society for self-education and Narodnik revolution

Circle of Tchaikovsky Чайковцы
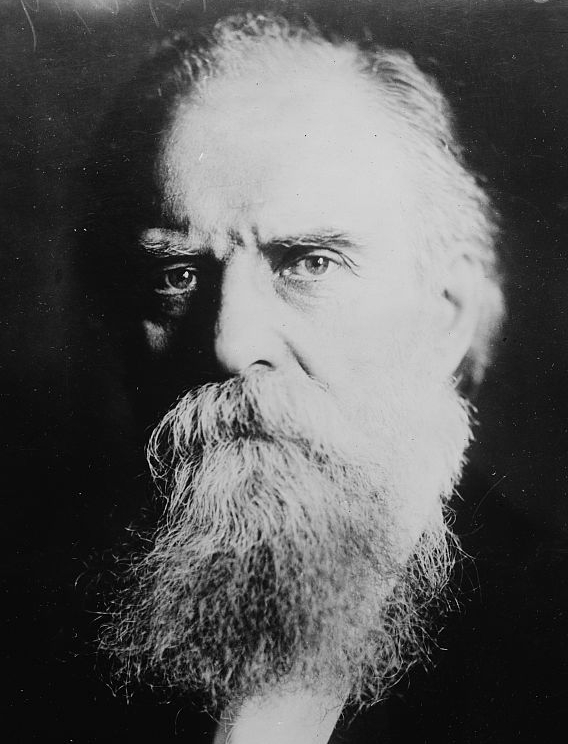
- Russian revolutionary Nikolai Tchaikovsky (1851–1926), after whom the Circle was named.
- Leader: Nikolai Tchaikovsky
- Founded: 1868
- Dissolved: 1874
- Headquarters: St. Petersburg
- Ideology: Populism; Revolutionary socialism
- Political position: Left-wing to far-left
- Movement: Narodniks

The Circle of Tchaikovsky, also known as Tchaikovtsy/Chaikovtsy/Tcaycoffsky (Russian: Чайковцы), or the Grand Propaganda Society (Russian: Большое общество пропаганды, Bolshoye obshchestvo propagandy) was a Russian literary society for self-education and a revolutionary organization of the Narodniks in the early 1870s. It was named after Nikolai Tchaikovsky, one of its prominent members.

== Background and origin ==
The intelligentsia of mid-nineteenth century Tsarist Russia were dissatisfied with what they saw as social stagnation of the nation and had begun to demand reform. Their attitude was called "nihilist" by Ivan Turgenev, explained by a character in his novel Fathers and Sons thus: "A nihilist is a man who does not bow down before any authority, who does not take any principle on faith, whatever reverence that principle may be enshrined in." The peak of this social activism gave rise to a number of secret organisations, among them Land and Liberty, People's Revenge, and the Circle of Tchaikovsky.

The Circle was founded in St. Petersburg during student unrest in 1868–1869 as a group opposed to what they saw as the reckless violence of Sergey Nechayev.

A literary society for self-education within the Medical Surgical Academy was the heart of the organization, the initial purpose of which was to share books and knowledge that had been banned in the Russian Empire. It included students Mark Natanson, V. M. Aleksandrov, and Anatoly Serdyukov, who were joined by Nikolai Tchaikovsky and Feofan Lermontov. Besides self-education, the circle's main tasks were to unite students of Petersburg and other cities, and conduct propaganda among workers and peasants with the purpose of fomenting a social revolution. The Tchaikovsky set higher moral standards for their members in the face of Nechayev's unscrupulousness. They had a negative attitude towards struggle for political freedoms, which, in their view, were only advantageous to the arising Russian bourgeoisie. These principles were formulated in the Программа для кружков самообразования и практической деятельности (Program for the circles of self-education and practical activity), put together by the Tchaikovtsy in late 1870 – early 1871.

== Activities ==
One of the first tasks of the Tchaikovtsy was to organize the printing, publishing, and distribution of scientific and revolutionary literature with the help of publishers Nikolai Polyakov, Kozma Soldatyonkov, and others. These literary works included the first volume of Das Kapital by Karl Marx, and books by others including Nikolai Chernyshevsky, Nikolai Dobrolyubov, Alexander Herzen, Pyotr Lavrov, Vasili Bervi, Ferdinand Lassalle, Charles Darwin, and John Stuart Mill. In the summer of 1871, the circle of Natanson merged with a female self-education circle of Alexandra Kornilova and Sophia Perovskaya. Soon, they were joined by Peter Kropotkin, Sergei Stepnyak-Kravchinsky, Dmitry Klements, Sergei Sinegub, Nikolai Charushin, Leonid Shishko, and others. The central Petersburg circle comprised around 60 people. Circles in Moscow (Nikolai Alexandrovich Morozov, Lev Tikhomirov, Mikhail Frolenko), Odessa (Felix Volkhovsky, Andrei Zhelyabov), Kiev (Yakov Stefanovich, Pavel Axelrod) and other cities sided with the Petersburg cell on a federal basis. Altogether, the Tchaikovtsy numbered around 100 participants.

In 1872, the Tchaikovtsy began organizing circles of workers with the purpose of training propagandists for work in the countryside. These activities were most successful in Petersburg and Odessa, where the circles comprised around 400 workers. Some of these workers—including Viktor Obnorsky and Feodor Kravchenko—would later become the founders of the first proletarian organizations such as the Worker's Union of Southern Russia (Южнороссийский союз рабочих) and Northern Union of the Russian Workers (Северный союз русских рабочих). The results of this propaganda work were summarized in a report by Peter Kropotkin, which would be discussed in the Petersburg circle of the Tchaikovtsy in late 1873.

The final stage of activities of the Tchaikovtsy included the Going to the People campaign, bringing revolutionary propaganda and organization directly to the peasants of Russia. In 1873/1874, most members of the circle were arrested and were later prosecuted in the trial of the 193. Tschaikovsky joined a religious-communist group and emigrated to the United States in 1874.

== Similar articles ==
- Nihilist movement
- Samizdat

== Bibliography ==
- Avrich, Paul (1971) [1967]. The Russian Anarchists. Princeton: Princeton University Press. ISBN 0-691-00766-7. OCLC 1154930946.
- Beran, Michael (2007). Forge of Empires, 1861-1871. New York: Free Press. ISBN 978-0-7432-7069-4.
- Berlin, Isaiah (2008). Russian Thinkers. Penguin Classics. ISBN 978-0-14-144220-4.
- Eklof, Ben; Saburova, Tatiana (2018). "'Remembrances of a Distant Past': Generational Memory and the CollectiveAuto/Biography of Russian Populists in the Revolutionary Era". The Slavonic and East European Review. 96 (1): 67–93. doi:10.5699/slaveasteurorev2.96.1.0067. JSTOR 10.5699/slaveasteurorev2.96.1.0067.
- Hodge, Carl (2008). Encyclopedia of the Age of Imperialism, 1800-1914. Westport: Greenwood Press. ISBN 978-0-313-33404-7.
- Mavor, James (1914). An Economic History of Russia. London: J.M. Dent & Sons. OCLC 1616923.
- Yarmolinsky, Avrahm (2014) [1956]. Road to Revolution: A Century of Russian Radicalism. Princeton, New Jersey: Princeton University Press. ISBN 978-0691610412. OCLC 890439998.
