= Klara Berkova =

Russian writer and doctor (1881–1938)

Klara Naumovna Berkova (Russian: Клара Наумовна Беркова; 1881, Nikolaev - 1938, Moscow), was a Russian writer, medical doctor science activist, and anti-religious propagandist.

== Life ==
Berkova was born in Nikolaev or Mykolayiv, Ukraine in a Jewish family. She received her higher education (medical and humanitarian) in Geneva, Switzerland, where she began to publish her writing. She returned to Russia in 1920. She is the author of several popular biographies: Voltaire (with her commentaries published in a one-volume book of Voltaire, M., 1938), A. S. Pushkin, A. Herzen (1922; 1923), A. Griboedov, P. Holbach (1923), N. G. Chernyshevsky (1925), S. Kravchinsky (Stepnyak) (1925), A. D. Mikhailov (1926) and others, as well as essays on the scientists of the Middle Ages. Author of anti-religious brochures: "Life, its Manifestation, Origin and Development" (1922), "Anti-religious education in the family" (1931), "Does a soul exist?" (1931) and others; medical brochures: "The Truth about Syphilis", (1925), "Tuberculosis is a Worst Enemy of the People" (1925), "Who to Believe? (Doctors and Healers)" (1929), "The Surest Path to Health" (1930) and others. She died in Moscow in 1938 and was buried at the Novodevichy Cemetery (Columbarium, 59 section).

== Books ==
In Russian

- Процесс Людовика XVI (Louis XVI Process) / К. Н. Беркова. - Петербург : Гос. изд-во, 1920. - 168, 4 с.;
  - Процесс Людовика XVI (Louis XVI Process) / К. Н. Беркова. - 2-е изд., испр. и доп. - Москва : Красная новь, 1923. - 308 с.; 23 см. - (Великая французская революция).
- Рыцарь духа. [Герцен] (Knight of the Spirit. [Herzen]): Биографич. повесть для юношества / К. Н. Беркова. - Москва : Л. Д. Френкель, 1922. - 45, [3] с.;
- А. И. Герцен : Биографич. повесть для юношества (A.I. Herzen: A Biographical Tale for the Young)/ К. Н. Беркова. - 2-е изд. - Москва : Красная новь, 1923. - 46 с.;
- П. Гольбах (P. Holbach) / К. Н. Беркова. - Москва : Красная новь, 1923. - 63, 2 с.;
  - П. Гольбах (P. Holbach) / К. Н. Беркова. - 2-е изд., испр. и доп. - Москва : Красная новь, 1923. - 82 с.;
- Что такое зараза и как от нее уберечься (What is an Infection and How to Protect Yourself from it) / К. Н. Беркова. - 2-е изд., испр. - Москва; Ленинград : Гос. изд-во, 1926 (М. : 1-я Образцовая тип.). - 30, [1] с.;
  - Что такое зараза и как от нее уберечься (What is an Infection and How to Protect Yourself from it) / К. Н. Беркова. - Москва : Гос. изд-во, [1925]. - 32 с.; 17 см. - (Библиотека для рабочих и крестьян "Изба-читальня").
- Жизнь, ее проявления, происхождение и развитие (Life, its Manifestations, Origin and Development) / К. Н. Беркова. - Москва : Гос. изд-во; Петроград : Гос. изд-во, 1923 (Типография им. Н. Бухарина). - 92 с. : ил.; 18 см. - (Начатки естествознания; 5).
  - Жизнь, ее проявления, происхождение и развитие (Life, its Manifestations, Origin and Development) / К. Н. Беркова. - 3-е изд., испр. и доп. - Москва; Ленинград : Гос. изд-во, [1925] ([М.] : тип. "Красный пролетарий"). - 77 с. : ил.; 20 см. - (Начатки естествознания).
- Н. Г. Чернышевский (N. G. Chernyshevsky): Биографич. очерк. 1828-1889-1924 / К. Н. Беркова. - Москва : Московский рабочий, 1925. - 280 с., 4 л. портр., факс.;
- С. М. Кравчинский : (S. M. Kravchinsky) (к тридцатилетию со дня смерти)/ К. Н. Беркова. - Москва : Изд-во Всесоюзного о-ва политкаторжан и сс.-поселенцев, 1925. - 16 с.;
- Чахотка — лютый враг народа (Tuberculosis is a Worst Enemy of the People): С рис. / Врач В. [!] Н. Беркова. - Москва; Ленинград : Гос. изд-во, 1925 (Л. : Тип. им. Гуттенберга). - 32 с. : ил.;
- Правда о сифилисе (The Truth about Syphilis)/ Д-р К. Н. Беркова. - [Москва] : Новая Москва, 1925. - 40 с.; 18 см. - (Библиотека санитарного просвещения/ под общ. ред. Мосздравотд.).
- А. Д. Михайлов (A. D. Mikhailov) /К. Н. Беркова. - Москва : Изд-во Всесоюзного о-ва политкаторжан и сс.-поселенцев, 1926. - 64 с.; 18 см. - (Дешевая библиотека журнала "Каторга и ссылка" 1926, № 16-17).
- Парижская коммуна и русские революционеры (Paris Commune and Russian Revolutionaries)/ К. Н. Беркова. - Москва : Всесоюзное о-во политкаторжан и сс.-поселенцев, 1926. - 32 с.; 18 см. - (Дешевая библиотека журнала "Каторга и ссылка" № 13).
- Чудо (Miracle) / К. Н. Беркова; Предисловие: В. Ральцевич. - Москва; Ленинград : Московский рабочий, 1929 ("Мосполиграф" 14-я тип.). - 175 с., [1] с. объявл. : ил., портр.; 21х15 см. - (Библиотечка воинствующего атеиста./ Под ред. В. Н. Ральцевича).
- Кому верить? : (Врачи и знахари) (Who to Believe? (Doctors and Healers))/ Н. К. Беркова. - [Москва] : Гос. мед. изд-во, 1929 (Н. Новгород : тип. Нижполиграф). - 20 с.;
- Как уберечься от заразы (How to Protect Yourself from Infection)/ К. Н. Беркова. - Москва; Ленинград : Гос. мед. изд-во, 1929 ("Мосполиграф", 16-я тип.). - 30 с., [2] с. объявл. : ил.;
- Как надо лечиться (How to Treat)/ К. Н. Беркова. - [Москва] : Госмедизд-во, 1930 (Л. : тип. "Коминтерн" Центриздата народов СССР). - 16 с.;
- Вольтер (Voltaire) / К. Беркова; Обложка: А. И. Кравченко. - Москва : Огиз : Соц.-экон. гос. изд-во, 1931 (Загорск : тип. "Шестой октябрь"). - 220, 4 с., 1 вкл. л. портр.;
- Антирелигиозное воспитание в семье (Anti-religious Upbringing in the Family) / К. Беркова; Центр. сов. Союза воинствующих безбожников СССР. - Москва : Безбожник, 1931. - 63 с.;
- Существует ли душа (Does a Soul Exist?) / К. Н. Беркова. - Москва; Огиз; Ленинград : Моск. рабочий, 1931 (М. : тип. "Образцовая"). - 38, [2] с.; 23х14 см. - (Библиотека для малограмотных/ Центр. совет Союза воинств. безбожников СССР).
- Что появилось раньше – курица или яйцо? (What Came First – the Chicken or the Egg?) : [Биологич. очерк] / К. Беркова. - [Москва] : Огиз. Моск. рабочий, 1932 (тип. изд-ва "Дер эмес"). - 32 с., 1 с. "Содержание" на обл. : ил.;
- Верный путь к здоровью (The Surest Path to Health)/ К. Н. Беркова. - [Москва] : Госмедизд-во, 1930 (21 тип. "Мосполиграф"). - 14, [2] с.;
- Начатки науки о жизни (The Beginnings of Life Science) : [Происхождение и развитие органич. мира] : 49 рис. / К. Н. Берков. - Москва; Ленинград : Биомедгиз, 1936 (М. : тип. им. Сталина). - Переплет, 132 с. : ил.;
- Александр Сергеевич Пушкин (Alexander Sergeevich Pushkin) : [Очерк жизни и творчества] / К. Н. Беркова. - Москва : Гослитиздат, 1937 (1 тип. Трансжелдориздата). - Переплет, 206 с., 1 с. объявл. : ил.;
- Герои и мученики науки (Heroes and Martyrs of Science). - Москва; Ленинград : Детиздат, 1939. - 200 с. : ил. и портр.; 20 см. - (Школьная библиотека. (Для неполной средней и средней школы)).

In German

- Gibt es eine seele? (Does a Soul Exist?) / K. Berkowa; Aus dem rus. übersetzt von A. Romm. - Engels : Deutscher staatsverlag, 1933. - 20 с.;

In Greek

- Pos prep na giatrephkymes (How to Treat) / K. Perkov; Metaphrasi: Gioti Zevgolati. - Rostov Don : Komynisti, 1931. - 22 с.;

In Yiddish

- Dos lebn : Zayn ontflekung, ontshteyung un entviklung (Life, its Manifestations, Origin and Development) / K.N. Berkov [!]; Yidish: F. Ayznshtat un F. Muler דאס לעבן : זיין אנטפלעקונג, אנטשטייונג און אנטוויקלונג / [...] ק.נ. בערקאוו; יידיש: פ. אייזנשטאט און פ. מולער. - Minsk : Melukhe-farlag fun Vaysrusland, 1925. - 96 с. : Ил.; 17 см. - מינסק : cמעלוכע-פארלאג פון ווייסרוסלאנד, 1925. - 96 с. : Ил.; 17 см. - Минск : Белорусское государственное издательство, 1925. - 96 с. : Ил.;
- בערקאָווא .ק Vos iz antshtanen frier - di hun oder di ay? (What Came First – the Chicken or the Egg?)/ K. Berkova; Yidish - D.M וואָס איז אנטשטאנענ פריער - די הונ אָדער די איי / ק. בערקאָווא; יידיש - ד.מ. - Minsk : Melukhe-farlag fun Vaysrusland. Natssekter, 1932. - 31 с.; 21 см. - (Bibliotek far veynik-ivredike; No. 1). - (ביבליאָטעק פאר ווייניקיוורעדיקע; No. 1). - (Библиотека для малограмотных; No. 1). - מינסק : מעלוכע-פארלאג פונ ווייסרוסלאנד. יידסעקטער, 1932. - 31 с.; 21 см. - (Bibliotek far veynik-ivredike; No. 1). - (ביבליאָטעק פאר ווייניקיוורעדיקע; No. 1). - (Библиотека для малограмотных; No. 1). - Минск : Государственное издательство Белоруссии. Нацсектор, 1932. - 31 с.; 21 см. - (Bibliotek far veynik-ivredike; No. 1). - (ביבליאָטעק פאר ווייניקיוורעדיקע; No. 1). - (Библиотека для малограмотных; No. 1)
