= Serebrennikov =

Serebrennikov or Serebrenikov (Russian, Ukrainian: Серебренников or Серебреников) is a Russian masculine surname originating from the word serebrennik, meaning silversmith; its feminine counterpart is Serebrennikova or Serebrenikova. Notable persons with the surname include:

- Pyotr Serebrennikov, (1853–1905), Russian naval captain
- Gennady Serebrennikov (born 1958), Russian serial killer
- Kirill Serebrennikov (born 1969), Russian theatre and film director
- Leonid Serebrennikov (born 1947), Soviet and Russian actor and singer
- Serhiy Serebrennikov (born 1976), Russian and Ukrainian footballer

== See also ==
- Serebryakov
