= Feliks Volkhovsky =

Russian revolutionary

Feliks Vadimovich Volkhovsky
- Феликс Вадимович Волховский
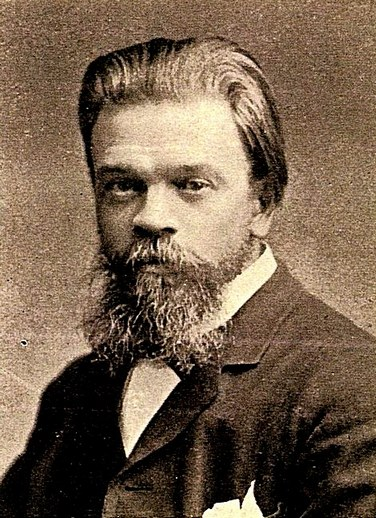
- Feliks Volkhovsky, late 19th century
- Born: 6 July 1846; Poltava, Russian Empire
- Died: 21 July 1914 (aged 68); London, United Kingdom

Feliks Vadimovich Volkhovsky (Russian: Феликс Вадимович Волховский; 1846 in Poltava – July 21 (August 3), 1914) was a Ukrainian and Russian revolutionary, journalist and writer.

== Life and work ==
Volkhovsky became involved in radical student politics in St Petersburg in the 1860s. In 1867, he co-founded the 'One Rouble Society' with German Lopatin; it was dedicated to propaganda and educational work among the masses. After several arrests, Volkhovsky moved to Odessa in 1873, where he organised a circle affiliated with the Circle of Tchaikovsky. One of the members of Volkhovsky's Odessa group was Andrei Zhelyabov, later one of the principal organisers of the assassination of Tsar Alexander II.

Volkhovsky was arrested again in 1874 and was a defendant at the 1878 'Trial of the 193'. Banished to Siberia, he escaped in 1889 via America. Volkhovsky was involved in 'Land and Liberty' and, when that group split in 1879, in 'The People's Will'. After escaping from Siberia, he made his way to Western Europe, eventually settling in London. He worked for the Free Russian Press and was a close friend and collaborator of the revolutionary writer S.M. Stepniak-Kravchinsky. In fact, Stepniak was on his way to visit Volkhovsky when he was killed by a train in 1895. Volkhovsky thereafter took over Stepniak's editorial duties at the journal Free Russia.

Volkhovsky served as a bridge-builder within the Russian opposition movement and between Russian radicals and the Western European public. He was in contact with older Russian émigrés of the generation of A.I. Herzen and young 'nihilists', with anarchists as well as political revolutionaries, with Russian social revolutionaries as well as liberals. He helped bring together Russian and Ukrainian social revolutionaries, protested against pogroms in Russia and resisted anti-Semitic tendencies in the Russian revolutionary movement. He also did his best to represent the Russian opposition movement to the West, maintaining contacts with British, French and German socialist parties, contributing articles to British and Americal papers (including The New York Times) and writing pamphlets aimed at the Western audience. He was involved in the Anglo-American Society of Friends of Russian Freedom. In the early 1900s (decade), Volkhovsky joined the Socialist-Revolutionary Party.
