= Nikolay Breshko-Breshkovsky =

Russian writer and journalist (1874–1943)

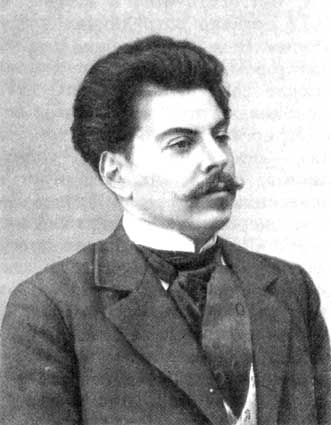
- Born: Николай Николаевич Брешко-Брешковский; 20 February 1874; Saint Petersburg
- Died: 24 August 1943 (aged 69); Berlin, Nazi Germany
- Relatives: Catherine Breshkovsky (mother)
- Writing career
- Pen name: Мата д’Ор, Старый петербуржец, Василий Верига, Николай Белый, Фраскуэлло, etc.
- Language: Russian, French
- Period: 1900–1943
- Genre: novel

Nikolay Breshko-Breshkovsky (Russian: Никола́й Никола́евич Бре́шко-Брешко́вский, also transcribed as Nikolaĭ Brechko-Brechkovskiĭ etc.; 20 [O.S. 8] February 1874 — 24 August 1943) was a Russian writer, a son of the renowned revolutionary Catherine Breshkovsky.

Due to the mother's revolutionary activity Nikolay was raised by relatives. He became a known writer in early 20th century. In 1920, after the Russian Revolution (1917), he emigrated to Warsaw, Poland, but was expelled in 1927 because of conflict with the Sanacja régime. He became a French citizen. During World War II, Nikolay collaborated with the Nazi Ministry of Public Enlightenment and Propaganda, writing for the pro-Nazi Novoye Slovo, a newspaper for White Russian emigrants. He died during the bombing of Berlin by British aircraft on the night of August 24, 1943.
