= Babette Deutsch =

American writer (1895–1982)

- Born: September 22, 1895; New York City
- Died: November 13, 1982 (aged 87)
- Education: Barnard College
- Occupations: Poet; critic; translator; novelist
- Spouse: Avrahm Yarmolinsky
- Children: Adam Yarmolinsky, Michael Yarmolinsky

Babette Deutsch (September 22, 1895 – November 13, 1982) was an American poet, critic, translator, and novelist.

== Background ==
Babette Deutsch was born on September 22, 1895, in New York City. Her parents were Michael Deutsch and Melanie Fisher Deutsch. She matriculated from the Ethical Culture School and Barnard College, graduating in 1917 with a B.A. She published poems in magazines such as the North American Review and the New Republic while she was still a student at Barnard.

== Career ==
During the 1940s, 1950s and into the 1960s, Deutsch was teaching at Columbia University, where her students included poet/publisher Lawrence Ferlinghetti. In 1946, she received an honorary D. Litt. from Columbia University.

Deutsch translated Pushkin's Eugene Onegin into English and also made some of the best English versions of Boris Pasternak's poems. Deutsch's own poems displayed what poet Marianne Moore called "her commanding stature as a poet."

== Personal life and death ==
On April 28, 1921, Deutsch married Avrahm Yarmolinsky, chief of the Slavonic Division of The New York Public Library (1918–1955), also a writer and translator. They had two sons, Adam and Michael.

Babette Deutsch died age 87 on November 13, 1982.

== Works ==
Poetic collections

- Banners (1919, George H. Doran)
- Honey Out of the Rock (1925, B. Appleton)
- Fire for the Night (1930, Jonathan Cape & Harrison Smith)
- Epistle to Prometheus (1931, Jonathan Cape & Harrison Smith)
- One Part Love (1939, Oxford University Press)
- Take Them, Stranger (1944, Henry Holt)
- Animal, Vegetable, Mineral (1954, E.P. Dutton)
- Coming of Age: New & selected poems (1959, Indiana University Press)
- Collected Poems, 1919–1962 (1963, Indiana University Press)
- The Collected Poems of Babette Deutsch (1969, Doubleday & Co.)

Novels

- A Brittle Heaven (1926, Greenberg)
- In Such A Night (1927, Martin Secker)
- Mask of Silenus: A Novel About Socrates (1933, Simon and Schuster)
- Rogue's Legacy: A Novel About Francois Villon (1942, Coward-McCann)

Other works

- Potable Gold: Some Notes on Poetry and This Age (1929, W. W. Norton)
- This Modern Poetry (1936, Faber & Faber)
- Walt Whitman: Builder for America (1941, Julian Messner)
- The Reader's Shakespeare (1946, Julian Messner)
- Poetry in Our Time (1952, Henry Holt & Co.; 2nd revised, Doubleday-Anchor, 1963)
- Poetry Handbook (1957, Funk & Wagnalls)
- Poems – Samuel Taylor Coleridge, ed. Babette Deutsch, illus. Jacques Hnizkovsky (1967, Thomas Cromwell)

Translations from Russian

- Modern Russian Poetry: an Anthology – trans. by Babette Deutsch and Avrahm Yarmolinsky (1921, John Lane)
- Contemporary German Poetry: an Anthology – trans. by Babette Deutsch and Avrahm Yarmolinsky (1923, Harcourt Brace & Co.)
- Eugene Onegin – Alexander Pushkin (1936, Random House; revised, Penguin Classics, 1965)
- Heroes of the Kalevala – illus. Fritz Eichenberg (1940, Julian Messner)
- Poems from the Book of Hours – Rainer Maria Rilke (1941, New Directions)
- Selected Poems – Adam Mickiewicz, trans. Babetted Deutsch (alongside W. H. Auden, Louise Bogan, Rolfe Humphries and Robert Hillyer) (1955, The Noonday Press)
- Two Centuries of Russian Verse – trans. Babette Deutsch and Avrahm Yarmolinsky (1966, Random House)

Children's books

- Crocodile – Korney Chukovsky, trans. Babette Deutsch (1931, J. Lippincott)
- It's A Secret! – illus. Dorothy Bayley (1941, Harper & Bros.)
- The Welcome – illus. Marc Simont (1942, Harper & Bros.)
- The Steel Flea – Nikolas Leskov, trans. Babette Deutsch and Avrahm Yarmolinsky, illus. Mstislav Dobufinsky (1943, Harper & Row) – revised 1964, illus. by Janina Domanska
- Tales of Faraway Folk – trans. Babette Deutsch and Avrahm Yarmolinsky, illus. Irena Lorentowicz (1952, Harper & Row)
- More Tales of Faraway Folk – trans. Babette Deutsch and Avrahm Yarmolinsky, illus. Janina Domanska (1963, Harper & Row)
- I Often Wish (1966, Funk & Wagnalls)
