= Adam Yarmolinsky =

American academic

- Born: November 17, 1922; New York City, U.S.
- Died: January 5, 2000 (aged 77); Washington, D.C., U.S.
- Education: Yale Law School; Harvard College
- Occupation: Lawyer
- Parent(s): Avrahm Yarmolinsky and Babette Deutsch

Adam Yarmolinsky (November 17, 1922 – January 5, 2000) was an American academic, educator and author, as well as a political appointee who served in numerous capacities in the Kennedy, Johnson and Carter administrations.

Besides serving in the White House, he also held posts in the Arms Control and Disarmament Agency. He was an aide to Secretary of Defense Robert McNamara at the Pentagon, where Yarmolinsky was an early critic of American policies in the Vietnam War.

== Biography ==
Yarmolinsky attended the Fieldston School in Riverdale and then graduated from Harvard College where he was editorial director of the Harvard Crimson. He enlisted in the US Army Air Forces during World War II and rose to the rank of sergeant.

Yarmolinsky took a law degree from Yale Law School in 1948. He served as a law clerk to Chief Judge Charles E. Clark of the United States Court of Appeals for the Second Circuit, based in New York, and later as a clerk to Supreme Court Justice Stanley F. Reed during the 1950 Term.

Following his service in the U.S. government, Yarmolinsky became Regent's Professor of Public Policy at the University of Maryland, Baltimore County (UMBC), where he served as Provost. Another academic post was as Ralph Waldo Emerson Professor at the University of Massachusetts Amherst in the mid 1970s. He was also a founding member of the Institute of Medicine of the U.S. National Academy of Sciences. In 1967, Yarmolinsky was named a fellow of the American Academy of Arts and Sciences.

== Marriage ==
On February 3, 1990, he married Dr. Sarah Ames Ellis, a clinical psychologist, in an Episcopalian ceremony in Manhattan. It was his third marriage. His first marriage was to Harriet L Rypins. His second marriage was to Jane Marie Cox Vonnegut, Kurt Vonnegut's first wife. She died in 1986.

== Death ==
He died, aged 77, at Georgetown University Hospital, of leukemia. He was survived by his third wife; his first wife, Harriet Yarmolinsky; and four children. Harriet Yarmolinsky died in January 2008 at age 81.

== See also ==
- List of law clerks for the sixth seat of the Supreme Court of the United States
