= Edmund Noble =

Scottish-American author, journalist and philosopher

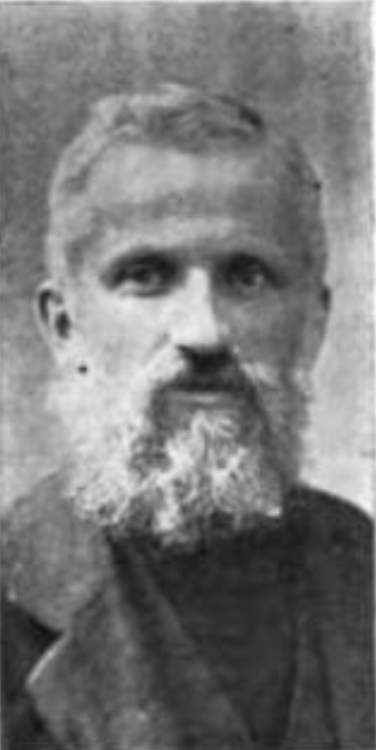
- Noble in a 1906 publication
- Born: January 8, 1853; Glasgow, Scotland
- Died: January 8, 1937 (aged 84); Malden, Massachusetts
- Occupation: Writer
- Spouse: Lydia Lvovna Pimenoff
- Children: 2

Edmund Noble (January 8, 1853 – January 8, 1937) was an Anglo-American author, journalist, philosopher and editor.

== Biography ==
Edmund Noble was born in Glasgow, Scotland, in 1853. He was the son of John and Eliza Noble who were natives of England. After the death of his father, in 1868, his mother and other members of the family emigrated to the United States in 1872, and located in Boston, Massachusetts. He was educated under the instruction of his grandfather the Rev. William George Nevatt, and in the public schools of St. Helen's, Lancashire, England. Upon completing his studies he entered the journalistic field.

Noble began his career as a reporter on the St. Helen's Standard in 1872. Later, he moved to Liverpool, where he worked on the Liverpool Courier and Liverpool City News. From 1882 to 1884 Noble was a special correspondent in Russia for various English newspapers including the Daily News, Daily Globe, Manchester Guardian and Glasgow Herald. There he met his future wife, Lydia Lvovna Pimenoff, a Russian citizen.

Noble was an advocate of emergent and theistic evolution. His evolutionary theory is outlined in his book Purposive Evolution (1926). It was positively reviewed by philosopher John Dewey, but criticized by psychologist William McDougall.

== Life in the United States ==
In 1885 Noble and Pimenoff moved to the United States. They settled in Boston, where Noble worked as a correspondent on the Boston Herald (1885–1931). He took part in Free Russia Movement as a member of the Society of American Friends of Russian Freedom. From 1892 to 1894 he edited the monthly magazine of the Society Free Russia. He could speak the Russian language and actively supported Russian émigrés.

Most of their life Edmund Noble and Lydia Pimenoff-Noble spent in Malden, near Boston. They had two daughters, Beatrice Noble and Lydia Edmundovna Noble. The latter was a poet, who translated from Russian into English the Russian poet Balmont.

Edmund Noble died in Malden on January 8, 1937. Only his daughter Beatrice was still alive at that time, Lydia Pimenoff-Noble having died in 1934 and Lydia Edmundovna Noble in 1929.

== Works ==
- Noble, Edmund 1886. "Imitation Among Atoms and Organisms". Appleton's Popular Science Monthly (February): 492–510.
- Noble E. - The Russian Revolt, Its Causes, Condition, and Prospects. Houghton, Mifflin & Co. Boston, 1885.
- Noble E. - "Suggestion as a Factor in Social Progress" // International Journal of Ethics. 1898. Vol. 8. № 2. Р. 214-228.
- Noble E. - Russia and the Russians. Houghton, Mifflin & Co. Boston, 1900.
- Pimenoff-Noble L.L., Noble E. - Before the Dawn: A Story of Russian Life. Houghton, Mifflin & Co. Boston, 1901.
- Noble E. - "The Objective Element in Esthetics" // The Philosophical Review. 1921. Vol. 30. № 3. Р. 271-281.
- Noble E. - "The Ways of Nature Beyond Darwinism" // The Philosophical Review. 1925. Vol. 34. № 4. Р. 380-388.
- Noble E. - Purposive Evolution: The Link Between Science and Religion. H. Holt and Company, 1926.
