= Nikolai Mezentsov =

Russian statesman, chief of police and adjutant general

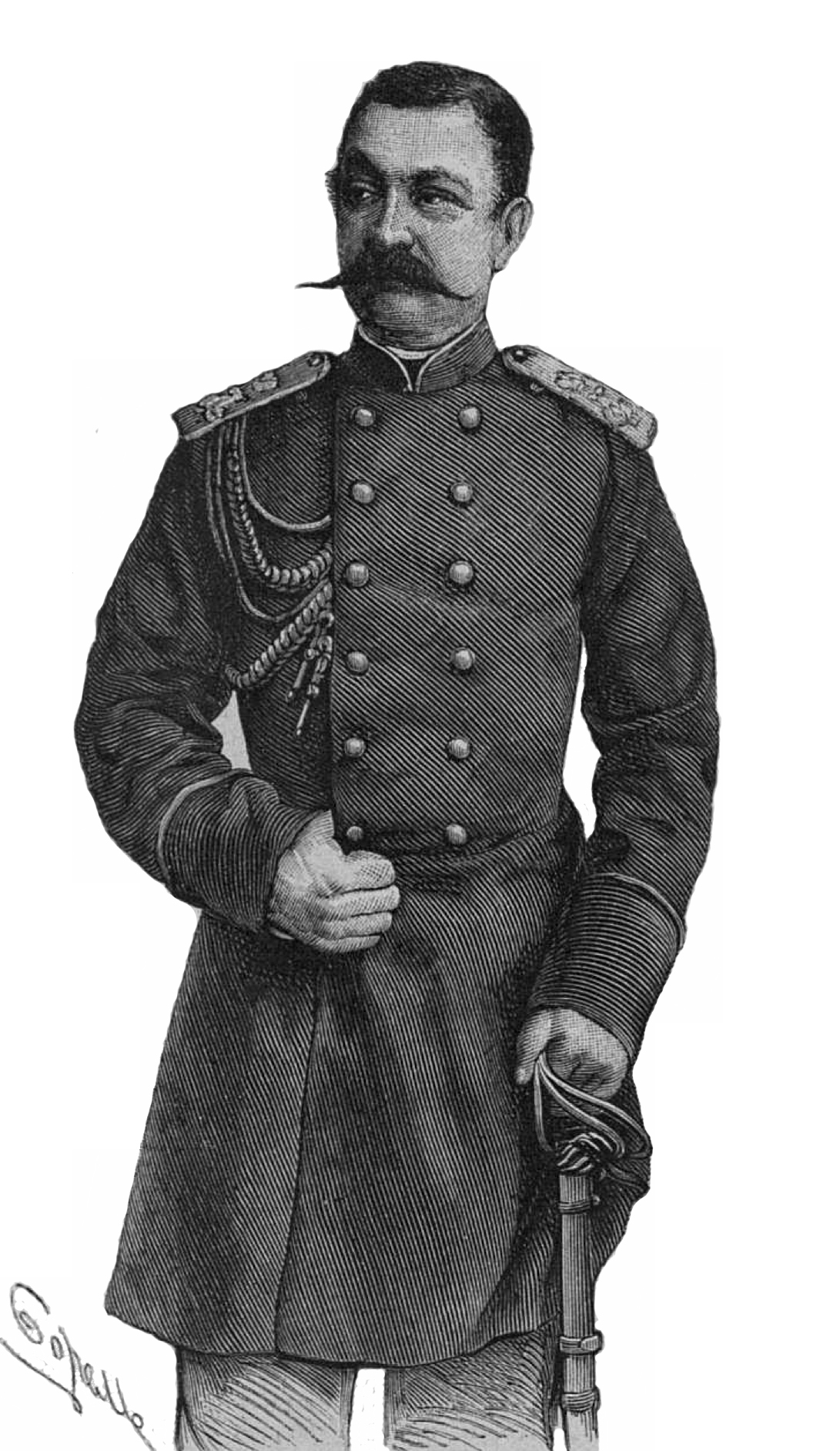
General Mezentsov Nikolay Vladimirovich

Nikolay Vladimirovich Mezentsov (also Mezentsev; Russian: Николай Владимирович Мезенцов/Мезенцев; 24 April 1827 – 16 August 1878) was a Russian statesman, chief of police, adjutant general (1871), and member of the State Council of Imperial Russia (1877), assassinated for having advocated harsh punishment against the constitutional movement.

Mezentsov was a descendant of Alexander Suvorov.

== Military career ==
Mezentsov began his military career in 1845. He participated in the Crimean War of 1853–1856. In 1864, he was appointed Chief of Staff of the Gendarmery Corps; in 1874, Deputy Chief of Gendarmery; and finally, in 1876, Chief of Gendarmery and Chief of the "Third Department" (Третье отделение; Political Surveillance and Investigations Department) of His Imperial Highness's Personal Chancellery.

== Politics and assassination ==
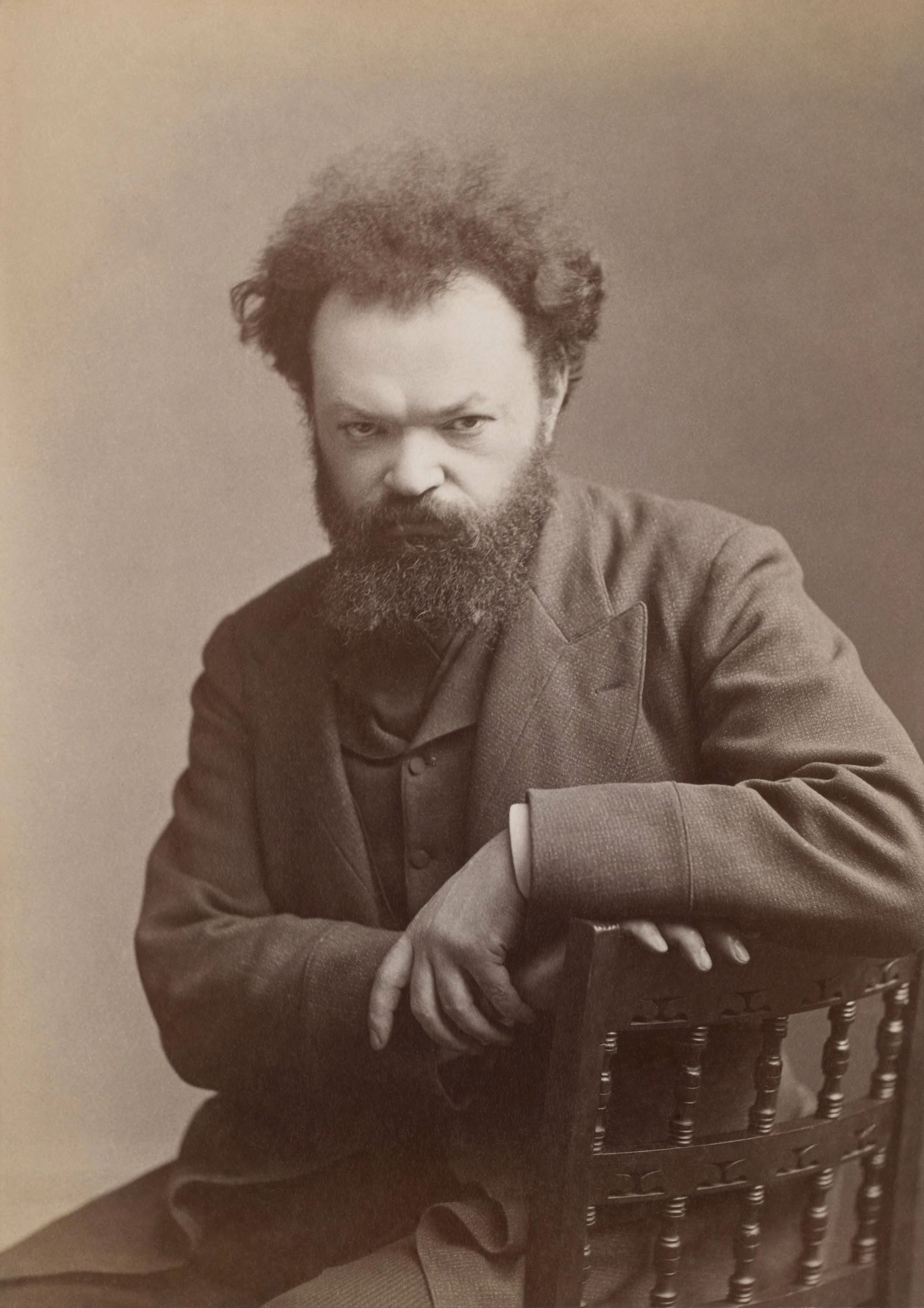
Sergey Kravchinsky, his assassin

Mezentsov was active during the famous Trial of the 193, in which university students were threatened with treason charges for having committed "disobedience". Alexander the Second, considered by some to have been an enlightened monarch, gave light sentences, until Mezentsov, then Chief of State Police, suggested that they should be heavy sentences. The emperor changed the sentences to heavier ones, and in response, Mezentsov was assassinated in 1878 by Sergey Kravchinsky, a member of the revolutionary group Land and Liberty.
