= Aleksei Serebryakov =

Aleksei Serebryakov may refer to:

- Aleksei Serebryakov (actor) (born 1964), Russian actor
- Aleksei Serebryakov (footballer) (born 1976), Russian footballer
