= Nakanune (newspaper) =

Nakanune (Russian: Накануне, IPA: [nəkɐˈnunʲe], lit. 'On the Eve') was a monthly Narodnik-oriented newspaper, published in London from January 1899 to February 1902. It published a total of 37 issues. Its director was Esper Aleksandrovich Serebryakov.
