= Avrahm Yarmolinsky =

American writer (1890–1975)

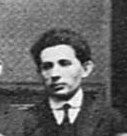
- Avrahm Yarmolinsky in 1919.
- Born: January 13, 1890; Haisyn, Russian Empire (now Ukraine)
- Died: September 28, 1975 (aged 85); New York City, United States
- Education: University of Neuchâtel (certificate, 1913); Free Academy (A.B., 1916); Columbia University (Ph.D., 1921)
- Occupations: Author, translator
- Employer: New York Public Library
- Spouse: Babette Deutsch (m. 1921)
- Children: Adam Yarmolinsky; Michael B. Yarmolinsky
- Parents: Bezalel Yarmolinsky; Malka (Nemoy) Yarmolinsky

Avrahm Yarmolinsky (January 13, 1890 – September 28, 1975) was an author, translator, and the husband of Babette Deutsch.

== Biography ==
Yarmolinsky attended the University of Neuchâtel in Switzerland before emigrating to United States in 1913. He received a bachelor's degree from City College of New York in 1916 and his doctorate from Columbia University in 1921. He married Babette Deutsch on April 28, 1921.

Yarmolinsky was head of the Slavonic Division of the New York Public Library from 1918 to 1955.

== Works ==
Yarmolinsky authored, edited, and translated many works throughout his life.

Author

- Dostoievksy: A Study in His Ideology (Columbia University Press, 1921)
- Turgenev: The Man, His Art and His Age (Century, 1926)
- The Jews and Other Minor Nationalities under the Soviets (Vanguard, 1928)
- Picturesque United States of America (Rudge, 1930)
- Russian Literature (American Library Association, 1931)
- Dostoevsky: A Life (Harcourt, 1934). Later expanded and published as Dostoevsky: His Life and Art (Criterion, 1957)
- Early Polish Americana: A Bibliographical Study (New York Public Library, 1937)
- Russian Americana: Sixteenth to Eighteenth Centuries (New York Public Library, 1943)
- Road to Revolution: A Century of Russian Radicalism (Cassell, 1957)
- Literature under Communism: The Literary Policy of the Communist Party of the Soviet Union from the end of World War II to the Death of Stalin (Russian and East European Institute, Indiana University, 1960)
- A Russian's American Dream: A Memoir on William Frey (University Press of Kansas, 1965)
- The Russian Literary Imagination (Funk & Wagnalls, 1969)
- Dostoevsky: Works and Days (Funk & Wagnalls, 1971)

Editor

- The Works of Alexander Pushkin (Random House, 1936)
- A Treasury of Great Russian Short Stories: Pushkin to Gorky (Macmillan, 1944)
- The Unknown Chekhov: Stories and Other Writings Hitherto Untranslated (Noonday, 1954)
- Soviet Short Stories (Doubleday Anchor, 1960)
- Russians, Then and Now: A Selection of Russian Writing from the Seventeenth Century to Our Own Day (Macmillan, 1963)
- (with Babette Deutsch) More Tales of Faraway Folk (Harper, 1963)
- The Letters of Anton Chekhov (Viking, 1973)
- (with Moura Budberg) The Collected Short Stories of Maxim Gorky (Citadel Press, 1988)

Editor and translator

- (with Deutsch) Modern Russian Poetry (Harcourt, 1921). Edited the first revision of Constance Garnett's 1912 translation of The Brothers Karamazov (1933), Revised and published as A Treasury of Russian Verse (Macmillan, 1949), An Anthology of Russian Verse, 1816-1960 (Doubleday Anchor, 1962), and Two Centuries of Russian Verse: An Anthology from Lomonosov to Voznesensky (Random House, 1966).
- (with Deutsch) Contemporary German Poetry: An Anthology (Harcourt, 1923)
- The Portable Chekhov (Viking, 1947)
