= Road to Revolution: A Century of Russian Radicalism =

1957 book by Avrahm Yarmolinsky

- Author: Avrahm Yarmolinsky
- Subject: Russian history
- Publisher: Cassell & Company
- Publication date: 1957
- Pages: 369
- OCLC: 1049326

Road to Revolution: A Century of Russian Radicalism is a 1957 book by Avrahm Yarmolinsky on 19th century Russian radicalism.
