= Maria Kolenkina =

Russian socialist revolutionary (1850–1926)

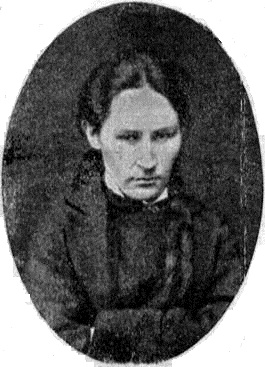
Maria Kolenkina

Maria (Masha) Alexandrovna Kolenkina (Russian: Мария Александровна Коленкина; 1850 – 31 Oct 1926) was a Russian socialist revolutionary from a merchant family in Temryuk, a small town on the Sea of Azov. While studying to be a midwife in Kiev in the early 1870s, she became part of the populist movement in Russia. She went "to the people" in 1874 to propagandise and later belonged to Bakunist socialists known as Iuzhnye Buntari (Southern Rebels) in Kiev. She was subsequently associated with the Land and Liberty movement in Saint Petersburg.

Together with Vera Zasulich she planned what was in posterity seen as the first modern terrorist act, to assassinate two Russian government officials on 24 January 1878. Her attempt to assassinate Vladislav Zhelekhovsky, the prosecutor in the Trial of the 193, failed, while Zasulich succeeded in injuring the governor of St. Petersburg, Fyodor Trepov. After a gun fight, the Russian gendarmes arrested Kolenkina on 11 October 1878, and she was sentenced to 10 years of hard labor and internal exile to Siberia.

== Bibliography ==
- Jay Bergman. Vera Zasulich: A Biography, Stanford University Press, 1983, ISBN 0-8047-1156-9, 261p.
- Yekaterina Breshko-Breshkovskaya, L Hutchinson, Hidden Springs of the Russian Revolution: Personal Memoirs of Katerina Breshkovskaia, Stanford University Press, 1931.
- Ana Siljak. Angel of Vengeance: The "Girl Assassin," the Governor of St. Petersburg, and Russia's Revolutionary World, St. Martin's Press, 2008, ISBN 978-0-312-36399-4, 370p.
- Five Sisters: Women Against the Tsar, eds. Barbara A. Engel, Clifford N. Rosenthal, Routledge, 1975, reprinted in 1992, ISBN 0-415-90715-2, pp. 61–62.
- Franco Venturi, Roots of Revolution. A History of the Populist and Socialist Movements in Nineteenth Century Russia (1960). Weidenfeld and Nicolson. London.
