= Narodniks =

1860s and '70s Russian political movement

The Narodniks (Note: /nəˈroʊdnɪk/ nə-ROHD-nik; Russian: народники, romanized: narodniki, IPA: [nɐˈrodʲnʲɪkʲɪ]) were a movement of the Russian Empire intelligentsia in the 1860s–1910s that advocated for the intelligentsia to draw closer to the common people. Some members of the movement became involved in revolutionary agitation against tsarism. Their ideology, known as Narodism, Narodnism, or Narodnichestvo, (Note: Russian: Народничество, romanized: Narodničestvo, IPA: [nɐˈrodnʲɪtɕɪstvə]; from народ (narod) 'people, folk', similar to the German Volk) was a form of agrarian socialism, though it is often misunderstood as populism. The movement was linked to the idea that the intelligentsia had lost its connection to "folk wisdom."

The Going to the People (Note: Russian: Хождение в народ, romanized: Hoždenije v narod, IPA: [xɐʐˈdʲenʲɪje‿v‿nɐˈrot]) campaigns were the central impetus of the Narodnik movement.

== Etymology ==
Naród (see нарóдъ and нарóд) is the Russian word for people, nation.

== History ==
Narodnichestvo as a philosophy was influenced by the works of Alexander Herzen (1812–1870) and Nikolay Chernyshevsky (1828–1889), whose convictions were refined by Pyotr Lavrov (1823–1900) and Nikolay Mikhaylovsky (1842–1904). In the late 19th century, socialism and capitalism were slowly becoming the primary theories of Russian political thought, and Mikhaylovsky, realizing this shift in thought, began to tweak his original ideas of Narodnism, such that two groups of Narodniks emerged: the so-called "Critical Narodniks" and "Doctrinaire Narodniks". Critical Narodniks followed Mikhaylovsky, and assumed a very flexible stance on capitalism, whilst adhering to their basic orientation. The more well-known Doctrinaire Narodniks had a firm belief that capitalism had no future in Russia or in any agrarian country.

Narodniks established semi-underground circles (кружки, kruzhki) such as the Chaikovsky Circle and Land and Liberty, with the goals of self-education and external propaganda work. They shared the common general aims of destroying the Russian monarchy and of distributing land fairly among the peasantry. The Narodniks generally believed that it was possible to forgo the capitalist phase of Russia's development and proceed directly to socialism.

The Narodniks saw the peasantry as the revolutionary class that would overthrow the monarchy, and perceived the village commune as the embryo of socialism. However, they also believed that the peasantry would not achieve revolution on their own, the peasantry would have to be influenced by the radicals, who would lead an otherwise passive peasantry to revolution. Vasily Vorontsov called for the Russian intelligentsia to "bestir itself from the mental lethargy into which, in contrast to the sensitive and lively years of the seventies, it had fallen and formulate a scientific theory of Russian economic development".

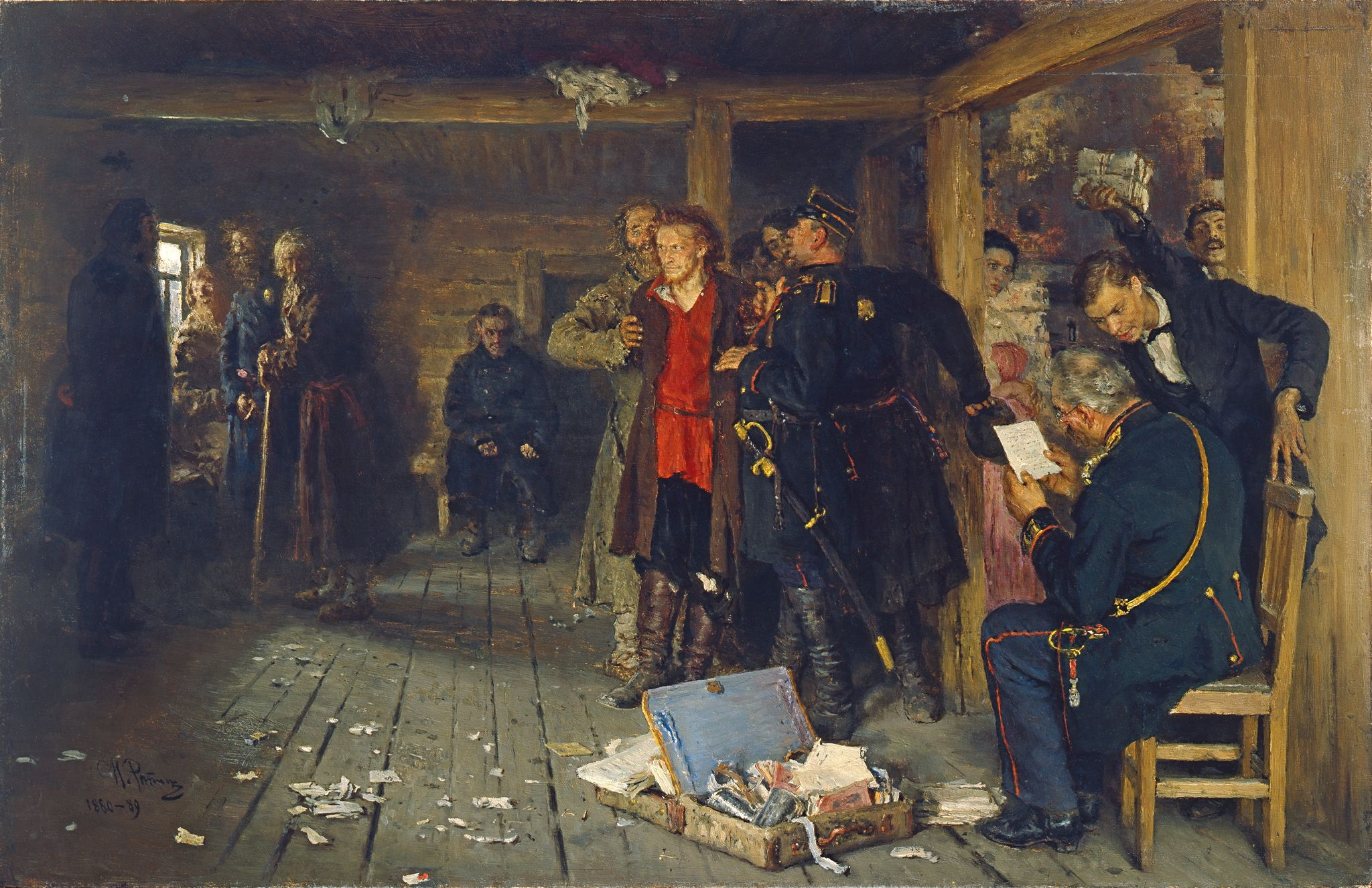
Arrest of a Propagandist (1892) by Ilya Repin

External videos
- Unofficial narodnik anthem

One response to this repression was the formation of Russia's first organized revolutionary party, Narodnaya Volya ("People's Will"), in June 1879. It favoured secret society-led terrorism, justified "as a means of exerting pressure on the government for reform, as the spark that would ignite a vast peasant uprising, and as the inevitable response to the regime's use of violence against the revolutionaries".

The attempt to get the peasantry to overthrow the Tsar proved unsuccessful, due to the peasantry's idolisation of the latter as someone "on their side". Narodism therefore developed the practice of terrorism: the peasantry, they believed, had to be shown that the Tsar was not supernatural, and could be killed. This theory, called "direct struggle", intended "uninterrupted demonstration of the possibility of struggling against the government, in this manner lifting the revolutionary spirit of the people and its faith in the success of the cause, and organising those capable of fighting".

On March 1, 1881, they succeeded in assassinating Alexander II. This act backfired on a political level, because the peasantry were generally horrified by the murder, and the government had many Narodnaya Volya leaders hanged, leaving the group unorganized and ineffective.

However, these events did not mark the end of the movement, and the later Socialist-Revolutionaries, Popular Socialists, and Trudoviks all pursued similar ideas and tactics to the Narodniks.

== Challenges ==
The Narodnik movement was a populist initiative to engage the rural classes of Russia in a political debate that would overthrow the Tsar's government in the nineteenth century. Unlike the French Revolution or the Revolutions of 1848, the "to the people" movement was political activism primarily by the Russian intelligentsia. These individuals were generally anti-capitalist, and they believed that they could facilitate both an economic and a political revolution amongst rural Russians by "going to" and educating the peasant classes.

The concept of the narod, like the volk in Germany, was an attempt to establish a new national identity in Russia that was both nationalistic and liberal. Fyodor Dostoevsky said that "none of us like the narod as they actually are, but only as each of us has imagined them." Russian political activists and government officials often claimed to be working to improve the lives of Russian peasants; in reality, they were manipulating the image of the peasant to further their own political objectives. Narodniks saw the peasant commune as a Russia that had not been tainted by western influence; Alexander Herzen wrote that the narod was "the official Russia; the real Russia." Hampered by a biased understanding of the peasantry, the Narodniks struggled, mostly unsuccessfully, to relate to the peasantry. Rural Russians were typically highly devoted to the Tsar and to the Russian Orthodox Church; not understanding this, the Narodnik rhetoric blamed the Tsar and centralized religion for the peasants' lack of land and material resources. Another example of the cultural disconnect between the intelligentsia and the peasants in the "to the people" movement was the Narodniks propagandizing through pamphlets when virtually all poor Russians were illiterate. In essence, the Narodnik movement in 1874 failed because they approached the peasants as though the peasants were intellectuals like themselves. Radicals in the latter part of the 1870s would learn that their concept of the narod was flawed, and intellectuals would have to instead make themselves into peasants to have success in the movement and begin a revolution against the government of Alexander II. Nikolay Chernyshevsky's "anthropological principle" held that all humans, regardless of class, have many intrinsic similarities, and intellectuals saw in the peasants a purified version of themselves that could be radicalized; time demonstrated that this was simply not the case.

Disunity between Bakunists and Lavrists, and Narodnik circles acting on independent initiative, were a further obstacle. The Bakunists believed revolution among the peasantry and populist uprisings in Russia would begin in the immediate future, the latter believed that propaganda should precede revolution, and the process would be more gradual. Bakunists believed that the peasants were ready to revolt with little propagandizing, whereas the Lavrists thought that considerable effort would be needed for the uprisings to begin. A lack of ideological unity resulted in varied approaches to the movement, and because of this the Narodniks no longer presented a united front to rural Russia. Some Narodniks believed in propagandizing by staying in one area for an extended period of time and assimilating into a commune that they were trying to revolutionize ("settled" propaganda), and others practiced propagandizing by using pamphlets and literature to maximize the number of people that the message reached ("flying" propaganda).

Disunity was prevalent even though Narodniks only traveled in three directions: either towards Volga, Dnieper, or Don. The Narodniki, who often took up work as nurses, scribes, schoolteachers, or participated in construction and harvest, struggled in unfamiliar terrain and poverty. All Narodniks resented foreign intervention into Russia, wanted Russian communes to control their own economic policies. Narodniks believed that the Tsar had impoverished the peasants, but Narodniks should have understood how highly the peasants regarded the Tsar. By failing to present a disciplined message and avoid directly attacking the Tsar, the Narodniki was often simply ignored. It was not until the formation of Narodnaya Volya in 1879 that young revolutionaries saw the need for organization and a disciplined message.

This lack of unity is responsible for the third reason that the "going to the people movement" failed; the peasants did not receive the intellectuals well. The reception that the intelligentsia received in the communes was so poor that it destroyed their idealized image of the peasant that was so common prior to 1874. The Narodniks saw peasants as a unified body; they thought that all peasants dressed poorly, so intellectuals dressed as poorly as was possible in order to fit in. In actuality, the peasants saw a poorly dressed person as a person with no authority or credibility. Accordingly, intellectuals dressing as they imagined the peasant dressed had an adverse effect; it actually made peasants suspicious of the intellectuals. Furthermore, Narodnik propaganda failed to address the more mundane, ordinary concerns of the peasantry. The everyday troubles of a rural Russian—a lack of material goods, poor healthcare, etc.—left little time for discussions of socialism or egoism.

Feminism in the Narodnik movement was also hard for the peasantry to accept. Pre-Marxist revolutionaries believed in an unusually strong equality of sex, and educated noblewomen played major roles in radical movements in the latter decades of the nineteenth century. The Narodniks promulgated Chernyshevskyan ideas of chaste cohabitation—that men and women should live together with no sexual interactions—and gender equality. These concepts were extremely odd to most peasants, and they did not generally react well to them. Furthermore, Narodniks often lived in communes where non-married men and women slept and lived in the same rooms. To Orthodox Russian peasants in the 1870s, such disregard of gender norms were both offensive and off-putting. Nearly 60% of Narodnik women were from the wealthy classes, which meant that Russian peasants could not relate to most intellectuals in the movement intellectually, economically or socially. As historian Daniel Field wrote, however, "Narodniks found that the peasant desire for land was not accompanied by a wish to rebel." The Russian government did not look favorably on the Narodniks advocating their overthrow, and peasants would only abide Narodniks so long as no criminal connections could be drawn to them. The Narodniks believed that the peasants were the class in Russia most prone to revolution, yet the peasants were not ready for revolutionary action.

Government suppression of the Narodniki resulted in mass trials that widely publicized the views of the Narodniki, and outraged the public. Between 1873 and 1877, the Russian police arrested 1,611 propagandists, of whom 15% were women. Radicals in the movement focused on Russia's oppressive taxation and land laws, and their propaganda was viewed as a threat by Tsar Alexander II. He ordered the arrest and trial of known Narodniks and Narodnik sympathizers in the peasantry; peasants were forced to expose the Narodniks to the authorities to escape persecution themselves. Beginning in 1877, a long and slow trial of 193 Narodniks was conducted. The propagandists had to either operate covertly or face imprisonment.

The more the government tried to repress the Narodniks, the more radical the Narodniks became. They grew increasingly selective in their membership, and their Zemlya i Volya (Land and Freedom) members would eventually evolve to form more terroristic organizations: Narodnaya Volya (The People's Will) and Chornyperedel (Black Repartition). These groups sought to begin a revolution through violence, and when members of Narodnaya Volya killed Tsar Alexander in 1881, the larger Narodnik movement lost virtually all support in the communes and rural parts of Russia. Government oppression further radicalized the Narodniks, and the peasants could not support enhanced radicalization of the already radical intelligentsia.

== Influence ==
Narodnichestvo had a direct influence on politics and culture in Romania, through the writings of Constantin Dobrogeanu-Gherea and the advocacy of the Bessarabian-born Constantin Stere (who was a member of Narodnaya Volya in his youth). The latter helped found various groups, included one formed around the literary magazine Viața Românească, which he published along with Garabet Ibrăileanu and Paul Bujor.

Stere and the Poporanist (from popor, Romanian for "people") movement eventually rejected revolution altogether. Nevertheless, he shared the Narodnik view that capitalism was not a necessary stage in the development of an agrarian country. This perspective, which contradicted traditional Marxism, also influenced Ion Mihalache's Peasants' Party and its successor, the National Peasants' Party, as well as the philosophy of Virgil Madgearu.

== See also ==
- Group of Narodnik Socialists
- Nakanune (newspaper)
- Nikolai Danielson
- Left Socialist-Revolutionaries
- Party of Narodnik Communists
- Party of Revolutionary Communism
- Popular socialism
- Russian nihilist movement

== Bibliography ==
- Pedler, Anne. "Going to the People: The Russian Narodniki in 1874–5". The Slavonic Review 6.16 (1927): 130–141. Web. 19 October 2011.
- von Laue, Theodore H. "The Fate of Capitalism in Russia: The Narodnik Version". American Slavic and East European Review 13.1 (1954): 11–28. Web. 19 October 2011.
- Woods, Alan. "Bolshevism: the Road to Revolution". WellRed Publications (1999): 33–50. Sat. 24 June 2017.
