= Elena Prushakevich =

Russian populist and revolutionary

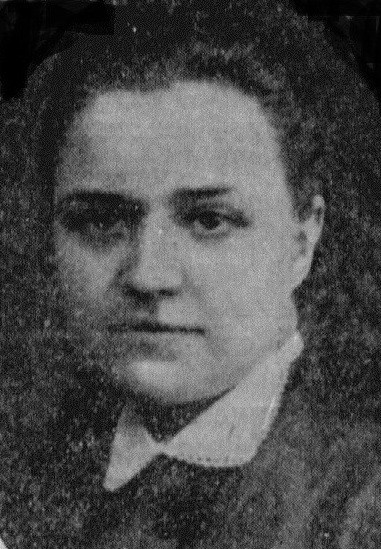
- Born: 1850; Arkhangelsk, Arkhangelsk Governorate, Russian Empire
- Died: 1918 (aged 67–68); Saratov, Russian SFSR
- Occupations: Underground printer and revolutionary
- Movement: Narodniks

Elena Ivanovna Prushakevich (Russian: Елена Ивановна Прушакевич; 1850–1918) was a Russian populist and revolutionary. She worked as a typesetter to produce underground publications, leading to multiple arrests and deportations during the reign of the Russian Empire.

== Biography ==
She was born in 1850 to Ivan Antonovich Prushakevich and a mother whose name is not stated in sources. She studied in the Arkhangelsk gymnasium.

=== Printing ===
In 1873, she moved into Kokorev's Manor House, an underground printing house where she lived and worked as a typesetter. She was joined by her sister Yulia as well as Efruzina Vikentievna Supinskaya, Elizaveta Fedorovna Ermolaeva and Larisa Timofeevna Zarudneva. While there, she worked under Ippolit Myshkin to print forbidden literature. These included «Историю французского крестьянина» (lit. 'History of the French Peasants'), «Чей-то братцы» (lit. 'Someone's Brothers'), and excerpts from the magazine Forward! as well as 40-50 blank passports.

At the end of May 1874, Prushakevich came with her sister Yulia to Saratov where they printed underground publications for I. Pelkonen. Less than a month later, she was arrested in a raid.

=== Arrest and exile ===
For the first few months of 1875, she was kept in the prison of the Trubetskoy bastion of the Peter and Paul Fortress, then in the House of Preliminary Detention.

In 1877, she was brought to trial by the Russian Empire's Governing Senate on charges of belonging to an illegal community, printing and distributing writings that incite rebellion, and disobedience to the supreme authority (process 193). Prušakevič refused to answer questions from the court and was removed from the courtroom in November.

In early 1878, she was found guilty and sentenced to deprivation of all rights of the state and to hard labor in factories for four years, while the court petitioned to replace the latter with a reference to living in Tobolsk, the historic capital of Russia's Siberia region. In May, 1878, the court's petition was granted. Before leaving for Siberia, she was kept in the Lithuanian Castle, a former prison in Kolomna, St. Petersburg, Russia. She was exiled to Tobolsk in August 1878.

=== Later life ===
She lived in the city of Kurgan with her husband Alexander Nikolaevich Averkiev. The husband, together with the exiled I.F. Belyavsky, organized a forge, and also repaired sewing machines.

In 1883 or 1887, together with her husband, she was transferred to the city of Surgut for facilitating the political escapes of S. A. Ivanov, N. Toluzakov and L. V. Chemodanova.

In February 1888, she participated in with Yugansky Surgut district in the collective protest of the exiles against the actions of the governor; searched May 22 (June 3), 1888. In 1889, by order of the Special Meeting, she was transferred to the village. Kondinskoye, Berezovsky district, Tobolsk province.

In 1891 free residence in Siberia was allowed. In 1893, at the end of her term, she was released from public supervision and, by order of the Police Department on January 29 (February 10), 1893, she was subject to secret supervision.

She was arrested in April 1902 in the Vasilevsky case and was kept in the Saratov prison, and in June 1902 she was sent to St. Petersburg.

From June 1902 to January 1903, she was kept in the prison of the Trubetskoy bastion of the Peter and Paul Fortress. Brought to the inquiry on charges of belonging to the Saratov group of socialist revolutionaries.

In February 1903, Saratov arrived home from St. Petersburg, and from there proceeded to Samara due to being asked to leave Saratov, where she was under supervision.

On June 2 (15), 1904, the Russian empire decreed her to live in the Arkhangelsk province under police supervision for 5 years.

=== Death ===
In 1918, Prušakevič heard the news of the death of her son, who was in the Workers and Peasants' Red Army. She died the same year of stroke in Saratov.
