= Trial of the 20 =

1882 judicial proceeding in St. Petersburg, Russia

The Trial of the 20 was the largest trial ever held of members of Narodnaya Volya (“The People's Will”), the organisation that assassinated the Tsar Alexander II. It is referred to as the Mikhailov Trial, after the lead defendant, Alexander Mikhailov. In contrast to the earlier Trial of the 193, or the Moscow trials held in the 1930s, there is no dispute about whether the 20 were guilty. All of them admitted their roles in carrying out or abetting terrorist acts, and with one exception, argued that they were justified. Most of the death sentences passed at the trial were commuted after an international outcry.

== Background ==
Narodnaya Volya was founded in 1879 by Russian populists, or Narodniks, who were disillusioned by the failure to rouse Russian peasants and workers to revolt against the autocracy through the spread of propaganda, and angry at the increasingly severe penalties imposed on their comrades, several of whom had been executed, and who united around the single aim of assassinating the Tsar, believing that a substantial section of public opinion would approve of the deed. Most of the members were former university students from middle class Their original leader was Mikhailov, Nikolai Morozov its leading theorist. After he was arrested, the group was led by Andrei Zhelyabov and Sophia Perovskaya. Perovskaya led the squad who killed the Tsar, after several failed attempts, on 13 March 1881 (1 March old style). Perovskaya, Zhelyabov and three others were executed after a rapid trial in April 1881. Within a few months, most of the leading members of Narodnaya Volya had been caught.

== The trial ==
The Trial of the 20 was held in front of a special sitting of the Senate, in St Petersburg, on 9–15 February 1882. The defendants were: Aleksander Mikhailov, Nikolai Morozov, Aizik Aronchik, Alexander Barannikov, Mikhail Frolenko, Grigori Isaev, Nikolai Kletochnikov, Nikolai Kolodkevich, Martyn Langans, Tatyana Lebedeva, Nikolai Sukhanov, Makar Teterka, Anna Yakimova, Ivan Emelyanov, Grigori Fridenson, Lyudmila Terentyeva, Mikhail Trigoni, Lev Zlatopolsky, Ferdinand Lustig, and Vasili Merkulov.

At the conclusion of the trial, ten of the defendants were sentenced to death. They included two women - Lebedeva, and Yakimova, who was pregnant. Three others were sentenced to hard labour for life; three - Terentyeva, Trigoni and Zlapolsky - were sentenced to 20 years hard labour; Fridenson to ten years and Lustig to four years hard labour.

Merkulov, a carpenter arrested in February 1881 for his part in trying to mine the Tsar's train near Odessa, who co-operated with the police, and gave evidence against the others. was pardoned.

The death sentences invoked a reaction in Russia, and abroad. The French novelist Victor Hugo, who was particularly distressed by the prospect that two women were to be hanged, as had already happened to Perovskaya, wrote an impassioned letter to the new Tsar, Alexander III, pleading: "In the darkness, I cry for mercy."

Leo Tolstoy also wrote to Alexander III in March 1881, pleading for clemency, and warning: "If you do not forgive, but execute the criminals, you will have uprooted three or four individuals from among hundreds and, evil begetting evil, 30 or 40 more will grow up in place of these three or four." He sent the letter to the Chief Procurator of the Holy Synod, Konstantin Pobedonostsev asking him to pass it on to the Tsar, but Pobedonostsev, who wanted to see the revolutionaries executed, held on to it until after Perovskaya and four others had been hanged.

All the death sentences were commuted to life imprisonment, except in the case of Sukhanov, a lieutenant in the imperial navy, who was shot in front of the fleet in Konstadt on 19 March 1881.
