= Dmitri Feodorovich Trepov =

Head of the Moscow Police in the Russian Empire

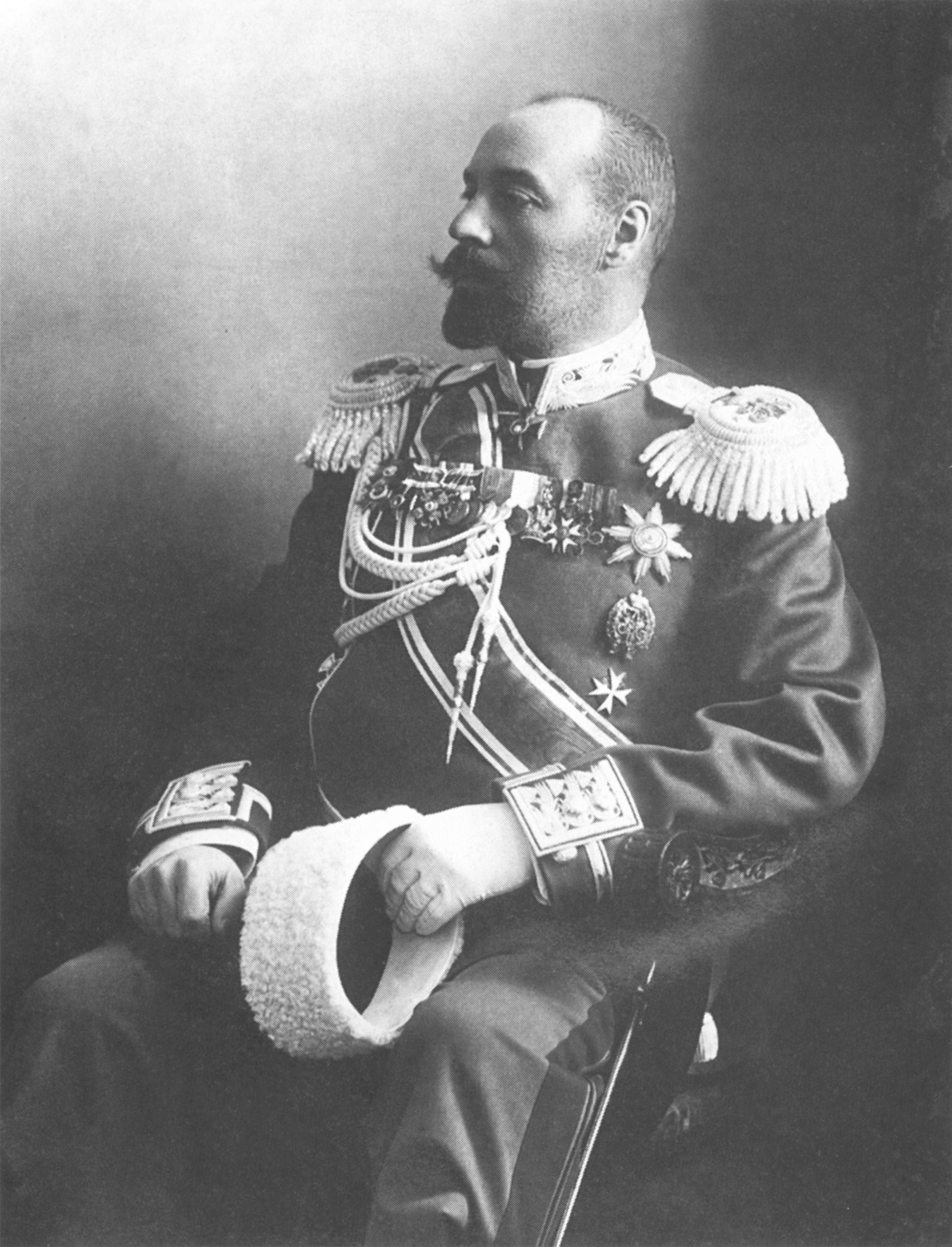
Dmitri Feodorovich Trepov. 1905.

Dmitri Feodorovich Trepov (transliterated at the time as Trepoff; Russian: Дми́трий Фёдорович Тре́пов) (15 December 1850 – 15 September 1906) was Head of the Moscow police, Governor-General of St. Petersburg with extraordinary powers, and Assistant Interior Minister with full control of the police. His attempts to restore order were overwhelmed by the revolution of 1905; he retained influence with the Tsar Nicholas II, when appointed as the Commandant of the Imperial Palace.

== Life ==
Dmitri was the second son of General Fyodor Trepov who was involved in the suppression of the January Uprising in 1864 and appointed as the mayor of St. Petersburg. Dmitri was the brother of A. F. Trepov, Vladimir F. Trepov, and F. F. Trepov Jr.

After his education and training in the Corps des Pages, Trepov participated in the Russo-Turkish War (1877–78).

After being promoted to head of the police of Moscow, in July, 1877, Alexei Bogolyubov, a Polish inmate, refused to remove his cap before Trepov's father, Fyodor. In response, Bogolyubov was sentenced by Fyodor to be flogged. This occurred at the time of the Trial of the 193, a mass trial of students accused of "disobedience" and charged with treason. In response to these two acts of barbarism, Vera Zasulich attempted to assassinate Fyodor, shooting at him but only wounding him, after which he retired.

Trepov was involved in the 'Third Section', named by Grand Duke Sergei, Governor General of Moscow Governorate. In 1896 he became Chief Police of Moscow, where he took a strong line against student agitators. The year after he was shot and wounded in his leg.

A few days after Bloody Sunday (1905), on 12 January 1905 (O.S.), Trepov was appointed in St. Petersburg (then the capital of the Russian Empire) to become Governor General of the Saint Petersburg Governorate with full power to forbid all congresses, associations, or meetings. He took his residence in the Winter Palace. Along with Plehve and Count Ignatyev Trepov promoted a policy of repression and anti-Jewish persecution. He personally edited pamphlets.

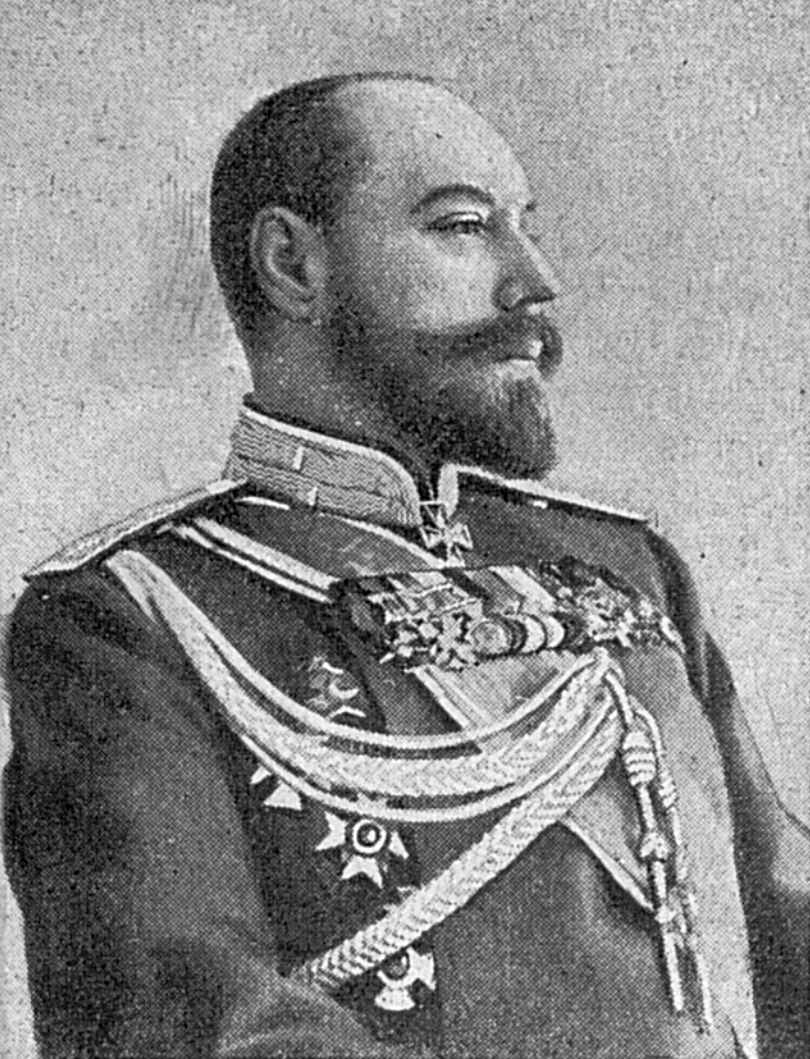
Dmitriy Trepov

At the beginning of June 1905 he was appointed Assistant Minister of the Interior under Alexander Bulygin: he appeared to acquiesce in Prime Minister Count Witte's reforms. Trepov, protected by Vladimir Freedericksz, was described by Witte as the unofficial dictator of the country, ruling the government. Trepov allowed students in September the right to assemble on university campuses, and removed the police, but one month later he was urging “the most drastic measures” to end the strike of railway workers. Trepov ordered provincial police to “act in the most drastic manner...not stopping at the direct application of force.” On 14 October (O.S) he gave orders to “Spare no cartridges and use no blanks”: the police and the army ignored the order. The police surrounded the University of St. Petersburg, forbade rallies, and threatened to clear the campus by force. Trepov warned the Tsar that order could not be forcibly restored without very heavy bloodshed. A few days later he did sign the October Manifesto, in which his dismissal was one of the demands. Trepov sent in his resignation. There were demonstrations for and against the Manifesto, and street fighting in St. Petersburg between the Black Hundreds and workers. On 26 October (O.S.) the Tsar dismissed Trepov and appointed him Master of the Alexander Palace at Tsarskoe Selo, so he had daily contact with the Emperor; his influence at court was paramount.

Late June 1906, after the dissolution of the First Duma, he promoted a cabinet with only Kadets, which in his opinion would soon enter into a violent conflict with the Emperor and fail. He secretly met with Pavel Milyukov, who opposed to Pyotr Stolypin, Alexander Izvolsky and Vasily Maklakov, promoting a coalition cabinet. Trepov was a lifelong reactionary anti-reformist, like his father. He strongly believed that autocracy was the only way for Russia.

Trepov was subject to many assassination threats - some of those involved stated that he was in fact safe on the streets, as he had been marked for assassination in his own bedroom; two of his nieces were among those who attempted to assassinate him. In early July assassins tried to kill him at Peterhof Palace, but in September he died of angina pectoris.
