= Tatyana Lebedeva (revolutionary) =

Russian revolutionary (1850–1887)

- Татьяна Лебедева
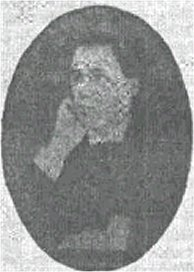
- Born: 1850; Bogorodsk, Moscow, Russian Empire
- Died: 19 June 1887 (aged 36–37); Kara katorga, Transbaikal, Russian Empire
- Known for: Assassination of Alexander II of Russia
- Political party: Narodnaya Volya
- Movement: Narodniks
- Criminal charges: Regicide
- Criminal penalty: Penal labour
- Spouse: Mikhail Frolenko

Tatyana Ivanovna Lebedeva (Russian: Татьяна Ивановна Лебедева; 1850–1887) was a Russian Narodnik revolutionary. A member of the executive committee of Narodnaya Volya, she participated in the assassination of Alexander II of Russia and was tried during the Trial of the 20.

== Biography ==
Tatyana Lebedeva was born in 1850, in the town of Bogorodsk. She spent her early life living with her brother Peter, the local judge of the Zamoskvorechye District. Radical activists, such as members of the Chaikovsky Circle, frequently gathered at their house. Before long, Lebedeva had herself joined the Narodniks. She taught at workers' schools, distributed radical literature and organised workers.

Lebedeva was arrested for the first time in June 1874, along with her sister-in-law Vera, on charges of propaganda. She was convicted in 1877, during the Trial of the 193. She then met Mikhail Frolenko, who she later married. In 1879, Lebedeva joined the executive committee of the terrorist organization Narodnaya Volya. That same year, she began planning an assassination attempt in Odesa. In December 1880, she participated in the robbery of a bank in Chișinău.

In 1881, she took part in the assassination of Alexander II, helping to construct and lay a land mine under Saint Petersburg's Malaya Sadovaya Street. After the arrest of Mikhail Frolenko, Lebedeva attempted to secure a prison visit for his mother and visited her constantly, despite the risk of her own arrest. Frolenko himself remembered that she "[took] so little shelter that it looked as if she wished to be arrested". She was finally arrested on 3 September 1881.

She was tried as part of the Trial of the 20, during which Frolenko reported that she had confessed to her role in the production of the bomb, despite no informant being aware of her part in the assassination. Frolenko explained this behaviour as her being "afraid that she would not be spared and would not be released from the death penalty. She did not want to lag behind her comrades and she did her best to help the judges to hang her together with the others." She was found guilty of regicide and sentenced to penal labour for an indefinite period. Her health rapidly deteriorated during her time in the prison camps of Siberia. She died in 1887, in the Kara katorga.

== Legacy ==
Lebedeva served as the inspiration for the character of Tanya Repina, in Sergey Stepnyak-Kravchinsky's 1889 novel Andrei Kozhukhov. After her death, terrorist attacks continued throughout the Russian Empire. During the Russian Revolution of 1905, revolutionaries in her home town of Bogorodsk disarmed the police, organized tax noncompliance and forbade local clerks from working. After the establishment of the Soviet Union, Lebedeva was condemned by a secretary of the Communist Party committee in Bogorodsk: "she killed a good tsar, is it worth keeping her memory alive?" Her childhood home was later destroyed and replaced with a bathhouse.

== Bibliography ==
- Maslov, E. (7 July 2005). "Татьяна Ивановна Лебедева". Bogorodsk local history (in Russian).
- Rumyantsev, Vyacheslav, ed. (20 January 2000). "Лебедева, Татьяна Ивановна" [Lebedeva, Tatyana Ivanovna]. Hronos (in Russian).
