= Anna Yakimova =

Russian revolutionary

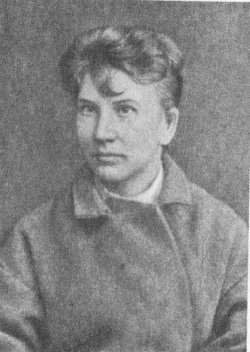
Anna Yakimova, 1883

Anna Vasilievna Yakimova (Russian: Анна Василиевна Якимова; 24 June [O.S. 12 June] 1856 – 12 June 1942) was a Russian revolutionary, one of the group who assassinated the Tsar Alexander II, and a long serving political prisoner.

== Early life ==
Anna Yakimova was born in a village called Tumyumuchascha, in Vyatka province, the daughter of the village priest. She was educated in the Vyatka diocesan school to the age of 16, then took a teacher training course, and in 1873, took up a post as a village teacher. Like dozens of other of her age, she was caught up in the ‘back to the people’ movement, and started spreading propaganda among the peasants. Arrested on 12 May 1875, she was a defendant in the Trial of the 193, but was acquitted. After her release, in January 1878, she joined Zemlya I Volya. When it split, she joined Narodnaya Volya, and was co-opted onto the party's executive committee.

== Terrorism ==
In spring 1880, Yakimova was sent to Odesa, where she and Grigori Isaev were delegated to construct a bomb, which was going to be detonated in a tunnel under Italyanska Street, on the route that the Tsar was expected to take as he travelled from Odessa station to the wharf where his steam boat was docked. This plan was aborted when Isaev accidentally blew three fingers off his hand. Yakimova cleaned and bandaged the injury, took him to hospital, and stayed with him during the operation in case he said anything incriminating while under anesthetic.

In February 1881, Narodnaya Volya used the same plan to attempt to assassinate Alexander II in St Petersburg. Yakimova and Yuri Bogdanovich, using false passports that identified them as a married couple named Kobozev, rented a shop at 56 Malaya Sadovaya, saying that they wanted to run a business selling cheese, while a team led by Andrei Zhelyabov dug a tunnel under the street, which they expected the Tsar to use. The ‘Kobozevs’ aroused suspicion because they were well educated but seemed to know very little about cheese, and were visited by police, who failed to spot the tunnel. This plan was abandoned when the Tsar took a different route, and was killed by a team of bomb throwers led by Sophia Perovskaya.

== Prison and exile ==
After the assassination, Yakimova moved to Kyiv, but was arrested there in April 1881. As a defendant at the Trial of the 20, she was sentenced to death, but after pleas for clemency, notably by Victor Hugo, her sentence was commuted to life imprisonment. While she was in solitary confinement in the Peter and Paul Fortress, the authorities learned that she was pregnant, probably by Isaev. She was moved to a separate building, her rations were improved, and she was permitted to sew baby clothes, but was denied any books. Her son was born in prison, and she had to keep constant watch to ensure he was not eaten by rats.

In 1883, Yakimova was transferred to Kara, in Siberia, but fell ill with typhus on the way, and did not arrive until May 1885. Her child was also constantly ill, and unable to care for him properly, she arranged for him to be adopted by a family who had been sent to Siberia as administrative exiles. She was held in women's prison in Kara from May 1885 to September 1890, and Ust-Kara, in 1890–92. She was released in September 1892, and permitted to settle in Kara, where she married a fellow exile, M.A.Dikovsky, by whom she had a daughter, Elizabeth, who died in infancy, and a son, Andrei, who became a scientist. She and her husband moved to Chita in 1899, to work on the construction of the Trans-Baikal railway.

In December 1904, Yakimova returned illegally to St Petersburg to join the Socialist Revolutionary Party, in time to take part in the 1905 revolution. But she was betrayed by the police spy, Yevno Azef, and arrested at a train station in August 1905, and sent back to Chita, where she spent eight months in prison. After her release, she lived in Chita for the next ten years.

== Later life ==
After the Bolshevik Revolution in 1917, Yakimova settled in Moscow where she worked at various trade unions and state cooperatives. She wrote extensively, and was a founder and senior member of the Society of Former Political Prisoners. After the German invasion, in 1941, she was evacuated to Novosibirsk, where she died. Yakimova was buried at the Zayeltsovskoye Cemetery.
