= Maria Olovennikova =

Russian revolutionary (1852–1898)

- Мария Оловенникова
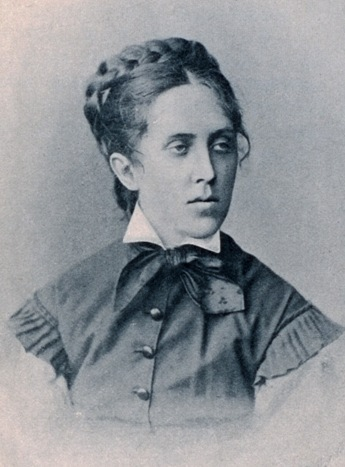
- Olovennikova (c.1885)
- Born: 15 May 1852; Pokrovskoye, Oryol Governorate, Russian Empire
- Died: 20 September 1898 (aged 46); Paris, France
- Other names: Maria Oshanina (first marriage); Maria Barannikova (second marriage); Marina Polonskaya (pseudonym)
- Organization(s): Zemlya i Volya (1878–1879); Narodnaya Volya (1879–1896)
- Spouses: Nikolai Oshanin (m. 1873; died 1878) Alexander Barannikov (m. 1879; died 1883) Ilya Rubanovich (m. 1883–1898)
- Children: 1

Maria Nikolaevna Olovennikova (Russian: Мария Николаевна Оловенникова; 15 May 1852 – 20 September 1898) was a Russian Narodnik revolutionary. Born into a noble family, she became a revolutionary socialist in the 1870s, participating in the activities of Zemlya i Volya and co-founding Narodnaya Volya. A convinced Jacobin, she believed in the need for a revolutionary organisation to overthrow the Tsarist autocracy and establish a centralised government that could direct a political and social revolution. After the assassination of Alexander II of Russia, she moved abroad to France and continued her activism with the Narodniks in exile. She suffered from ill health throughout the 1880s and 1890s, leading to her death in 1898.

== Biography ==
=== Early life ===
Maria Nikolaevna Olovennikova was born in 1852, into a Russian noble family, in the village of Pokrovskoye in the Oryol Governorate. She was educated at home. In 1873, aged 21, she married Nikolai Oshanin, with whom she had a daughter, Elena. She left her daughter in the care of her mother in 1875, allowing her to move to Saint Petersburg, where she studied as a paramedic and became a supporter of Pyotr Tkachev.

=== Narodnik activities ===
By this time, she had already fallen under the influence of the Narodniks, joining a revolutionary socialist circle led by Pyotr Zaichnevsky, who influenced her ideological development towards Jacobin ideas. In 1877, she helped organise Narodnik settlements in the southern provinces of Rostov and Voronezh. She also opened a flat for revolutionaries in Kharkiv, where she participated in an attempt to break Porfiry Voynoralsky out of prison.

When a provocative pamphlet published by Zaichnevsky led to a wave of arrests, Olovennikova was forced into hiding at her family's estate in Oryol, where she met Alexander Barannikov, a fellow Narodnik activist. After her husband Nikolai died, she went on to marry Barannikov. Now married to a militant partisan of the Narodnik movement, Olovennikova herself became interested in issues of political organisation. She believed that a revolutionary conspiracy ought to seize state power, in order to form a centralised government that could direct a political and social revolution, although she lost her faith in Zaichnevsky's hope for this to be a "perfect organisation". She returned to Saint Petersburg, where she joined the revolutionary organisation Zemlya i Volya.

=== Political organisation ===
As "illegals", she and Barannikov were isolated and unable to make any firm contacts in the city. But after a conversation with Mikhail Frolenko, who told her of his plans to establish a new organisation, she came to understand that "the time for isolated coups was over" and sided with the organisation's "politician" faction. In June 1879, members of this faction held a conference in Lipetsk; Olovennikova was the only woman in attendance. The conference agreed that "peaceful propaganda" was pointless while they still lived without civil liberties under the Tsarist autocracy, which it declared should be overthrown "by any means necessary". The implication was that the main goal of their new organisation would be to assassinate the Tsar. The result was the establishment of Narodnaya Volya, in which Olovennikova served on the executive committee.

In 1880, she moved to Moscow, where she headed the new organisation's local branch, together with Pyotr Tellalov. Under her influence, the organisation put out Jacobin appeals for the formation of a revolutionary dictatorship to radically transform the economy and abolish private property, only after which could a constituent assembly be formed and safely take over political power. By the time she returned to Saint Petersburg, she found that her fellow party members there only ever talked about dynamite. Her sister Natalya had been tracking the Tsar's every move, which caused her such stress that she had to leave the organisation. Following the assassination of Alexander II, she was actively sought by the police, but managed to avoid imprisonment.

=== Exile and death ===
In April 1882, Olovennikova fell ill with severe migraines and decided to move abroad the following month. She emigrated to France, settling in Paris under the assumed name of Marina Nikanorovna Polonskaya. In exile, she edited Narodnaya Volya's bulletin and established the rump "Group of Old Narodnaya Volya", of which she remained a member into the 1890s. From 1893 to 1896, she published a history of the Russian social revolutionary movement. She also received news of the death of her second husband Alexander Barannikov, who had been imprisoned in Shlisselburg Fortress and died from tuberculosis there. She remarried again, this time to the Ukrainian revolutionary Ilya Rubanovich.

By 1896, her health had severely deteriorated: her migraines were more frequent, she developed a catarrh in her stomach and became anemic. She also became increasingly worried about her comrades imprisoned in Shlisselburg Fortress and began to feel she too should be locked up, eventually resulting in a nervous breakdown that saw her committed to a psychiatric hospital. She died on 20 September 1898; some sources say she died of acute pneumonia, while others say that she committed suicide in order to end her chronic pain.

In her will, she asked that her friends not give her a funeral and instead remember her as "a person, not a corpse". Despite her wishes, she was buried in the presence of her friends. Her memoirs were published in 1907, in the sixth issue of Byloye.

== Bibliography ==
- Kan, G. S. (1996). "Идейные «Еретики» «Народной Воли»" [The Ideological "Heretics" of the "People's Will"]. In Morozov, K. N. (ed.). Индивидуальный политический террор в России [Individual Political Terror in Russia] (in Russian). Moscow: Memorial. ISBN 9785882550126. OCLC 35312558.
- Polyynkin, Alexander (25 April 2010). "Оловенниковы" [Olovennikovs]. Maloarhangelsk (in Russian).
- Porter, Cathy (1976). Fathers and Daughters: Russian Women in Revolution. London: Virago Press. ISBN 0-704-32802-X. OCLC 2288139.
- Shchetkova, Olga Anatolievna (11 February 2010). "Дворянский род Ошаниных" [Oshanin noble family]. Zhurnal.lib.ru (in Russian).
- Zhukov, Evgeny, ed. (1967). "Оловенникова, Ошанина, Мария Николаевна" [Olovennikova, Oshanina, Maria Nikolaevna]. Soviet Historical Encyclopedia (in Russian). Vol. 10. Moscow: Academy of Sciences of the Soviet Union. OCLC 249693790.
