= Alexander Barannikov =

Revolutionist

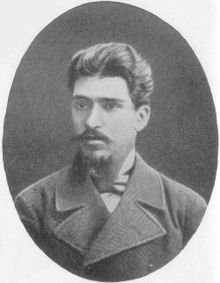
Alexander Ivanovich Barannikov

Alexander Ivanovich Barannikov (Russian: Александр Иванович Баранников; 1858 – 18 August 1883) was a Russian revolutionary and terrorist who was one of the leaders of the military wing of the Narodnaya Volya (People's Will), the organisation that assassinated the Tsar Alexander II.

== Biography ==
Born into the Russian nobility, Barannikov was educated at a military gymnasium (secondary school) in Orlov, and at the First Pavlovsk Military School in St Petersburg. In 1876, he faked suicide, leaving a note for the principal, to join the revolutionary movement, as a propagandist in the Rostov-on-Don area. In 1877, he joined the Zemlya i volya ("Land and Freedom") party. He settled in the Nizhny Novgorod region, trying to recruit local farmers. Returning to St Petersburg, he was one of the first to advocate that the revolutionaries should use terrorist tactics. He was one of the organisers of the assassination of the chief of the gendarmes, General Nikolay Mezentsov, who was stabbed to death by Sergey Kravchinsky.

Barannikov was one of the participants in the founding conference of Narodnaya Volya in Lipetsk conference, in June 1879, and was appointed to its executive committee. In 1880, he took part in attempts to kill the Tsar by placing a mine under the Moscow-Kursk railway, and by dynamiting the Kamenny Bridge in St Petersburg. Arrested in January 1881, he was a defendant at the Trial of the 20 in March 1882, and was sentenced to hard labour for life. He died of tuberculosis in the Aleyevsky Ravelin, in the Peter and Paul Fortress.

== Personality ==
According to Praskovya Ivanovskaya, who ran Narodnaya Volya's secret printing press: "In radical circles, he was justifiably known as a 'knight without fear or reproach', the most devoted soldier of the revolution ...(with) enviable tact in all matters, and, particularly, an unfailingly gentlemanly attitude to women."

== Marriage ==
Barannikov married a fellow revolutionary, Maria Olovennikova, who was about six years older than he was. She also was a founding member of the executive. She was assigned the task of running a safe house in St Petersburg. In 1882, she fled abroad to act as Narodnaya Volya's representative in Paris.
