= Arkhip Bogolyubov =

Russian revolutionary (1854–1887)

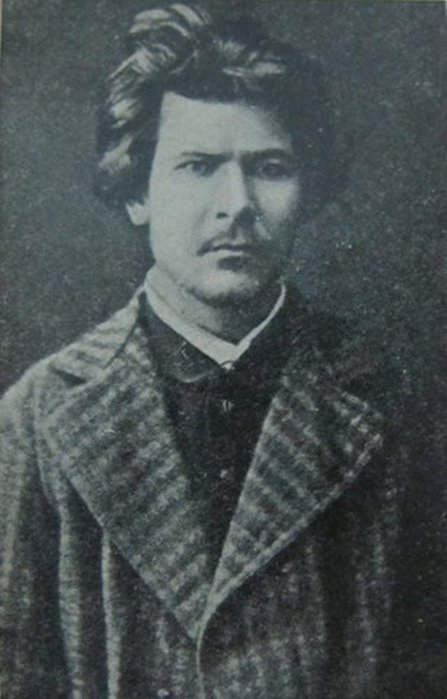

Aleksei Stepanovich Emelyanov (Russian: Алексе́й Степа́нович Емелья́нов; 14 March [O.S. 2 March] 1854 – after January 1887), also known by the pseudonym Arkhip Petrovich Bogolyubov (Russian: Архи́п Петро́вич Боголю́бов) was a Russian revolutionary whose brutal treatment was used as an example to deter others in the 1880s.

== Career ==
While he was at university Bogolyubov decided to go to the people, and spent several months trying to radicalise peasants around Taganrog, and Rostov-on-Don, in south Russia. On 6 December 1876, he was arrested during a student demonstration in Kazan Square, St-Petersburg. According to contemporary accounts, he was not one of the organisers of the demonstration, did not take any part, but arrived after the meeting had been forcibly dispersed by the police. The experienced revolutionaries had collectively decided that they should not expose themselves to arrest by demonstrating, and according to what Bogolyubov later told a fellow prisoner, "to avoid temptation, at the time of the demonstration I had gone to take part in other activities, namely to practise firearms." But the police believed he was one of the students involved in a fight that broke out after the demonstration, and he was sentenced to fifteen years hard labour.

== In Prison ==
In July 1877, Bogolyubov was being held in the Preventative Detention Centre in St Petersburg, along with dozens of political prisoners who would appear as defendants in the Trial of the 193, and was exercising in a prison yard during a visit by Fyodor Trepov, the governor general of St Petersburg. Trepov was enraged when Bogolyubov failed to take off his cap, and knocked it off his head, setting off a loud and violent protest by prisoners watching from their cells. Trepov ordered that Bogolyubov was to be flogged. The flogging was carried out three hours later. This was the first flogging in the 19th century to be inflicted on a member of the Russian intelligentsia, and was so violent that it drove him insane. According to a contemporary account, he was kept in prison, under the same conditions as other prisoners, although:

(he) had a fixed idea that everybody about him was in a conspiracy to take his life. Yet he was compelled to be shaved, just as others were. When the barber came to perform his office, the poor wretch screamed with terror and resisted with the fury of despair. But it was of no use. The wardens throttled and pinioned him and he was shaved whether he would or no.

In retaliation, Bogolyubov's old comrades in south Russia organised a squad of six men to assassinate Trepov. They were beaten to it by Vera Zasulich, who shot and wounded him in his office on 24 January 1878. This act was the start of the wave of political violence that culminated in the assassination of the Tsar Alexander II.

Bogolyubov was transferred to Kharkov central prison, then at the end of 1880, to a psychiatric hospital in Kazan. It is not known when he died, but it was "a few years" after being flogged. He is known to have been alive in January 1887, when he was placed in the care of his father.
