= Vera Zasulich =

Russian Marxist revolutionary (1849–1919)

- Вера Засулич
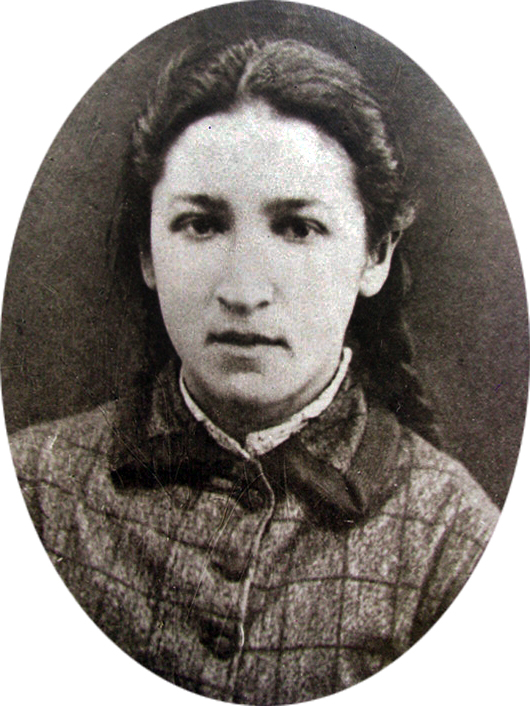
- Zasulich c. 1870s
- Born: 8 August 1849; Mikhaylovka, Smolensk Governorate, Russian Empire
- Died: 8 May 1919 (aged 69); Petrograd, Russian Soviet Republic
- Education: Kharkov University
- Known for: Attempted assassination of Fyodor Trepov and co-founding the Emancipation of Labour group
- Political party: Russian Social Democratic Labor Party (Mensheviks)
- Movement: Populism; Marxism; Menshevism
- Partner: Lev Deich

Vera Ivanovna Zasulich (Russian: Ве́ра Ива́новна Засу́лич; 8 August [O.S. 27 July] 1849 – 8 May 1919) was a Russian Marxist theorist and revolutionary. Born into impoverished nobility, Zasulich became involved in radical politics in the late 1860s. In 1878, she gained international renown for attempting to assassinate Fyodor Trepov, the Lord Mayor of St. Petersburg, to protest his abuse of a political prisoner. In a high-profile case that highlighted the unpopularity of the tsarist government, a sympathetic jury acquitted her.

To avoid re-arrest, Zasulich fled to Western Europe, where she became a key figure in the populist Black Repartition movement. Disillusioned with terrorism as a revolutionary tactic, she converted to Marxism and in 1883 co-founded the Emancipation of Labour group, the first Russian Marxist organization, with Georgi Plekhanov and Pavel Axelrod. The group struggled for years in exile, facing poverty, isolation, and official repression, but produced foundational works of the movement.

Zasulich later joined the editorial board of the influential newspaper Iskra, where she played a crucial role as a mediator. During the Second Congress of the Russian Social Democratic Labour Party in 1903, she sided with Julius Martov's Menshevik faction against Vladimir Lenin's Bolsheviks. She returned to Russia during the 1905 Russian Revolution but subsequently retired from active revolutionary politics. During World War I, she supported the Russian war effort and condemned the October Revolution of 1917 as a perversion of Marxism. She died in Petrograd in 1919. Remembered more as a moral icon than a theorist, Zasulich's life was defined by her steadfast commitment to the cause of revolutionary unity.

== Early life and revolutionary beginnings ==
=== Childhood and education ===
Vera Ivanovna Zasulich was born on 8 August [O.S. 27 July] 1849 on the Mikhailovka estate, in the Gzhatsk district of Smolensk Governorate. She was the fourth of five children of Feoktista Mikhailovna and Ivan Petrovich Zasulich. Her family belonged to the impoverished lesser nobility and were of Polish origin. After her father died when she was three, her mother sent Vera and two of her sisters to live with wealthier relatives, the Mikulich family, on their nearby estate of Biakolovo. Zasulich later recalled her childhood as unhappy, feeling like an "alien" in the Mikulich household, where she was ridiculed for her poverty and felt unloved.

She was educated by a governess named Mimina, who taught her French, German, and Russian literature. Zasulich disliked the conventional piety and commonness of her teacher, and by the age of fifteen, she no longer believed in God. She was, however, deeply influenced by the literary works of heroism and struggle she read, which offered an escape from her cold surroundings. For many women of her time, a revolutionary commitment was partly an escape from the stifling roles imposed by their sex, and Zasulich dreaded the fate of becoming a governess herself. In 1866, her mother sent her to a private pension in Moscow to train for this profession.

In Moscow, Zasulich was first exposed to radical political ideologies. Through her older sister Ekaterina, she was introduced to student revolutionary circles and began to read the works of radical thinkers like Nikolay Chernyshevsky and John Stuart Mill, as well as the populist writer Pyotr Lavrov. After a year at a justice of the peace's office in Serpukhov, where she was exposed to the desperate poverty of the peasantry, she moved to Saint Petersburg in 1868. There, she worked in seamstress and bookbinding collectives (artels) and taught illiterate workers in an evening school.

=== Nechaev affair and imprisonment ===
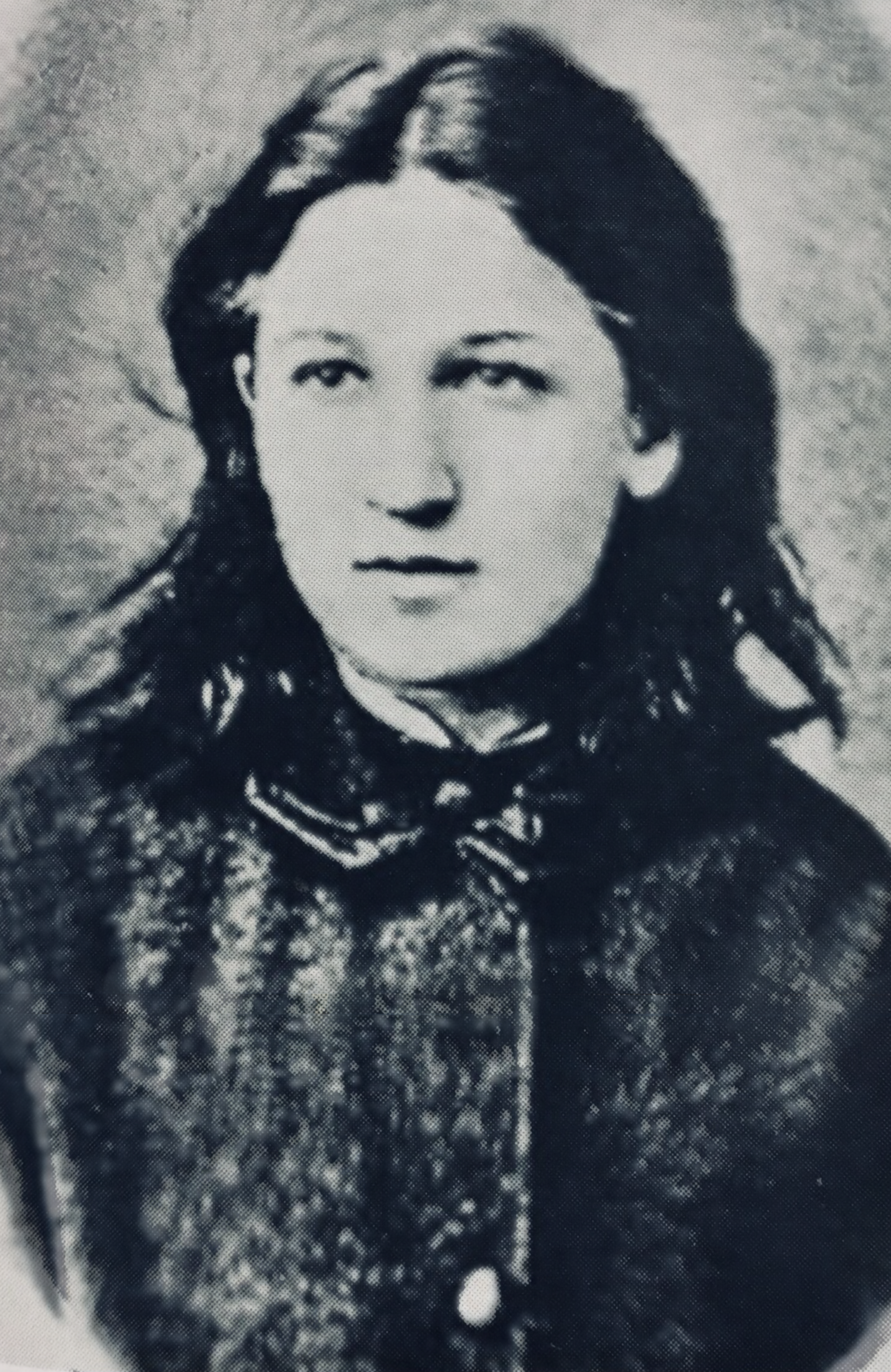
Zasulich in 1869

In St. Petersburg, Zasulich became involved with the nihilist revolutionary leader Sergey Nechaev. Jay Bergman describes Nechaev as an "ambitious, clever, somewhat theatrical, and very egoistic young man". Zasulich was drawn to his charisma and his apparent connection to the common people (the narod), a class she hoped to serve but knew little about. She acted as a courier and go-between for him.

On 30 April 1869, Zasulich was arrested along with her mother and sister in Moscow. She was imprisoned without trial for two years, first in the Litovsk prison and then in the Peter and Paul Fortress, for her connections to Nechaev. The unjust treatment by the tsarist government, which gave no formal explanation for her arrest, solidified her revolutionary commitment. While she was in prison, Nechaev and his followers murdered a fellow revolutionary, Ivan Ivanov, an act that shocked and repulsed Zasulich. However, Bergman notes, she came to distinguish between Nechaev's brutal methods, which she saw as a betrayal of the revolutionary ethic, and the ideals that had first attracted her to the cause.

== Populism and Trepov shooting ==
=== Exile and Southern Rebels ===
After appearing as a witness in the Nechaevist trial, Zasulich was released in March 1871, only to be immediately re-arrested and exiled to Kresttsy in the Novgorod Governorate. Her petitions allowed her to move to the more distant town of Soligalich and finally, in December 1873, to Kharkov. There, she studied midwifery at Kharkov University but was barred from practicing her profession because of her status as an administrative exile. For years, she lived in extreme poverty, enduring near starvation and what Bergman calls "bureaucratic muddleheadedness" from the government. These experiences deepened her conviction that the state must be destroyed.

Upon her release from exile in September 1875, Zasulich went to Kiev and joined the Yuzhnyye Buntari ('Southern Rebels'), a populist revolutionary group. The group was part of the "Going to the People" movement, though its members were grappling with the failures of earlier attempts to incite the peasantry. Zasulich participated in revolutionary activities, including an attempt to live among the peasantry in a village with fellow revolutionary Mikhail Frolenko. The plan failed because her Moscow accent and ineptitude at housekeeping betrayed her origins. During this period, she knew of and approved the group's brutal attack on a suspected police informer, N. E. Gorinovich. She also began a common-law marriage with a fellow member of the Yuzhnyye Buntari, Lev Deich, which would be the most significant romantic relationship of her life.

=== Attempted assassination of Trepov ===
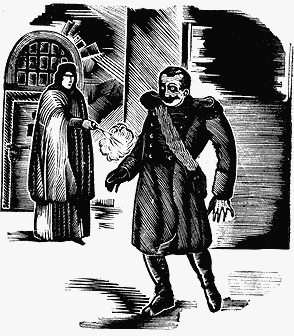
Depiction of Zasulich's attempted assassination of Trepov in 1878

In July 1877, General Fyodor Trepov, the Lord Mayor of St. Petersburg, ordered the flogging of a political prisoner, Arkhip Bogoliubov, for failing to remove his cap in Trepov's presence. The act was illegal and caused outrage in revolutionary circles. When Zasulich, then living in St. Petersburg, read about the incident, she was horrified. She saw a parallel between Bogoliubov's humiliation and her own suffering at the hands of the state. After a period of planning, and with the knowledge of other revolutionaries including members of Zemlya i Volya, she decided to act.

On 5 February [O.S. 24 January] 1878, Zasulich went to Trepov's office under the guise of a petitioner. When she was granted an audience, she pulled a pistol from under her shawl and fired, seriously wounding him in the pelvis. She made no attempt to escape and was immediately arrested.

=== Trial and acquittal ===
The government, confident that a jury would convict her, decided against a secret political trial and sent her case to the criminal courts. The trial, held on 12 April [O.S. 31 March] 1878, became a public sensation. It was presided over by the prominent liberal judge Anatoly Koni, who conducted the proceedings impartially. Zasulich's defense attorney, Pyotr Alexandrov, delivered a brilliant speech that focused on her noble character and the injustices she had suffered, effectively putting the government's actions on trial rather than her own. Koni later recalled that the jury was judging her character, not her actions.

Against all expectations, the jury found Zasulich not guilty. The verdict was met with an explosion of joy in the courtroom. A large crowd outside the courthouse celebrated the acquittal, lifting Zasulich onto their shoulders and marching through the streets. Police soon attempted to re-arrest her, sparking a confrontation in which a student was killed. Zasulich managed to escape in the confusion and went into hiding. The acquittal was a major political embarrassment for the tsarist government and gave a powerful impetus to the revolutionary movement, helping to legitimize political terrorism in the eyes of many radicals. Zasulich herself, however, came to deeply regret this outcome, writing later that she could not "endure a [terrorist] movement which my case had such influence in initiating".

== Conversion to Marxism ==
=== Emigration and Chyorny Peredel ===
In May 1878, Zasulich fled Russia for Switzerland to avoid arrest. In exile, she became a prominent figure among Russian populists. After the revolutionary organisation Zemlya i Volya split in 1879 over the question of terrorism, she rejected the pro-terrorist Narodnaya Volya ('People's Will') and joined the anti-terrorist Chyorny Peredel ('Black Repartition') faction, which advocated for continued propaganda work among the peasantry.

Zasulich's experiences and the failures of populism led her to question its core tenets. In a famous letter dated 28 February [O.S. 16 February] 1881, she wrote to Karl Marx, asking for his opinion on the Russian peasant commune (the obshchina). She posed the central question of Russian populism: could the commune serve as a basis for a direct transition to socialism, bypassing the capitalist stage of development that Marx's theory seemed to require for Western Europe? She described the issue as "a matter of life and death" for Russian socialists. Marx's cautious reply suggested that such a path was theoretically possible, provided a Russian revolution coincided with a proletarian revolution in the West. This unorthodox response from Marx, which diverged from the rigid economic determinism of his earlier work, likely delayed Zasulich's full conversion to orthodox Marxism.

=== Founding the Emancipation of Labour Group ===
Following the assassination of Tsar Alexander II by Narodnaya Volya in March 1881, the tsarist government unleashed a wave of severe repression. In the face of this crackdown, Zasulich dedicated herself to reuniting the fractured revolutionary movement. She became a leader of the Red Cross of Narodnaya Volya, an organisation created to aid political prisoners and foster collaboration between the populist factions. Her efforts were consistently frustrated by deep personal and ideological divisions, particularly between the advocates of terrorism and those who, like herself, favored peaceful propaganda.

Founders of the Emancipation of Labour group; Zasulich at top left

By 1883, the possibility of reunification had vanished. Disagreements with the remaining leaders of Narodnaya Volya had become irreconcilable. According to Bergman, this final failure, born of what she saw as the other faction's intransigence, pushed Zasulich and her closest comrades to make a definitive break with populism. On 12 September 1883, in Geneva, Zasulich, Georgi Plekhanov, Pavel Axelrod, and Lev Deich announced the formation of the Emancipation of Labour group. It was the first self-proclaimed Russian Marxist organization, dedicated to translating and disseminating the works of Marx and Friedrich Engels and developing a Marxist analysis of Russian conditions.

== Emancipation of Labour Group and life in exile ==
=== Years of hardship ===
The early years of the Emancipation of Labour group were marked by hardship and isolation. The group was small, impoverished, and scorned by the remnants of the populist movement. Zasulich's health, never robust, deteriorated; she suffered from chronic respiratory ailments and in 1889 contracted tuberculosis, which afflicted her for the rest of her life. A profound personal and political blow came in February 1884 when Lev Deich was arrested in Germany and extradited to Russia, where he was exiled to Siberia. Bergman argues that his absence deprived Zasulich of her most important source of emotional and political support, leaving her more vulnerable to the intellectual dominance of the often-pompous Plekhanov.

Zasulich's conversion to Marxism was a slow and complex process. In 1884, she translated Engels's Development of Scientific Socialism, but in her preface, she argued for a path to socialism based on a revitalised peasant commune, a view that was more populist than Marxist. The preface was dropped from later editions at the insistence of Plekhanov and Axelrod. It was not until the early 1890s that she fully embraced the orthodox Marxist view that Russia must pass through a capitalist stage before a socialist revolution was possible. Throughout her work, she stressed the moral and psychological power of collective action, viewing the socialist party as an instrument for the spiritual transformation of its members.

=== Time in England and revisionism ===
From 1894 to 1897, Zasulich lived in London, partly to escape the incessant squabbles of the émigré community in Geneva. There, she became a friend of Engels and continued her writing. This period precipitated a severe intellectual crisis. Direct observation of the English working class, which she found to be largely non-revolutionary and concerned with material gain, combined with her reading of the third volume of Marx's Capital, led her to question the core predictions of Marxist theory. Like Eduard Bernstein, who was developing his revisionist theories in London at the same time, she saw that capitalism was not collapsing but adapting and that the working class was not becoming uniformly impoverished.

Zasulich resolved this crisis not by abandoning Marxism, but by re-interpreting it. She argued that capitalism's greatest failure was not economic but cultural: it created a spiritual void in the lives of workers that a socialist intelligentsia could fill with revolutionary ideas. While economic conditions determined consciousness, they did so only within "very wide limits"; politics and ideas could shape the outcome. This view placed enormous importance on the role of intellectuals in guiding the proletariat. During this time, she also contributed to the influential but short-lived legal Marxist journal Novoe Slovo under the pseudonym V. Ivanov.

== Iskra and Bolshevik–Menshevik split ==
=== Role on Iskra ===
Returning to Switzerland in 1897, Zasulich became embroiled in conflicts between the Emancipation of Labour group and a new, younger generation of Russian Marxists in the Union of Russian Social Democrats Abroad. These "youngsters", many of whom were proponents of "Economism", urged a focus on the immediate economic struggles of workers rather than on distant political goals. Zasulich, while sharply critical of the Economists' lack of political vision, also recognised the growing power of the younger generation and sought to avoid a definitive split, acting as a mediator in the factional disputes. For instance, in 1897 she and Axelrod helped to prevent a rupture with younger revolutionaries from Russia, whose mission had been jeopardized by Plekhanov's intransigence.

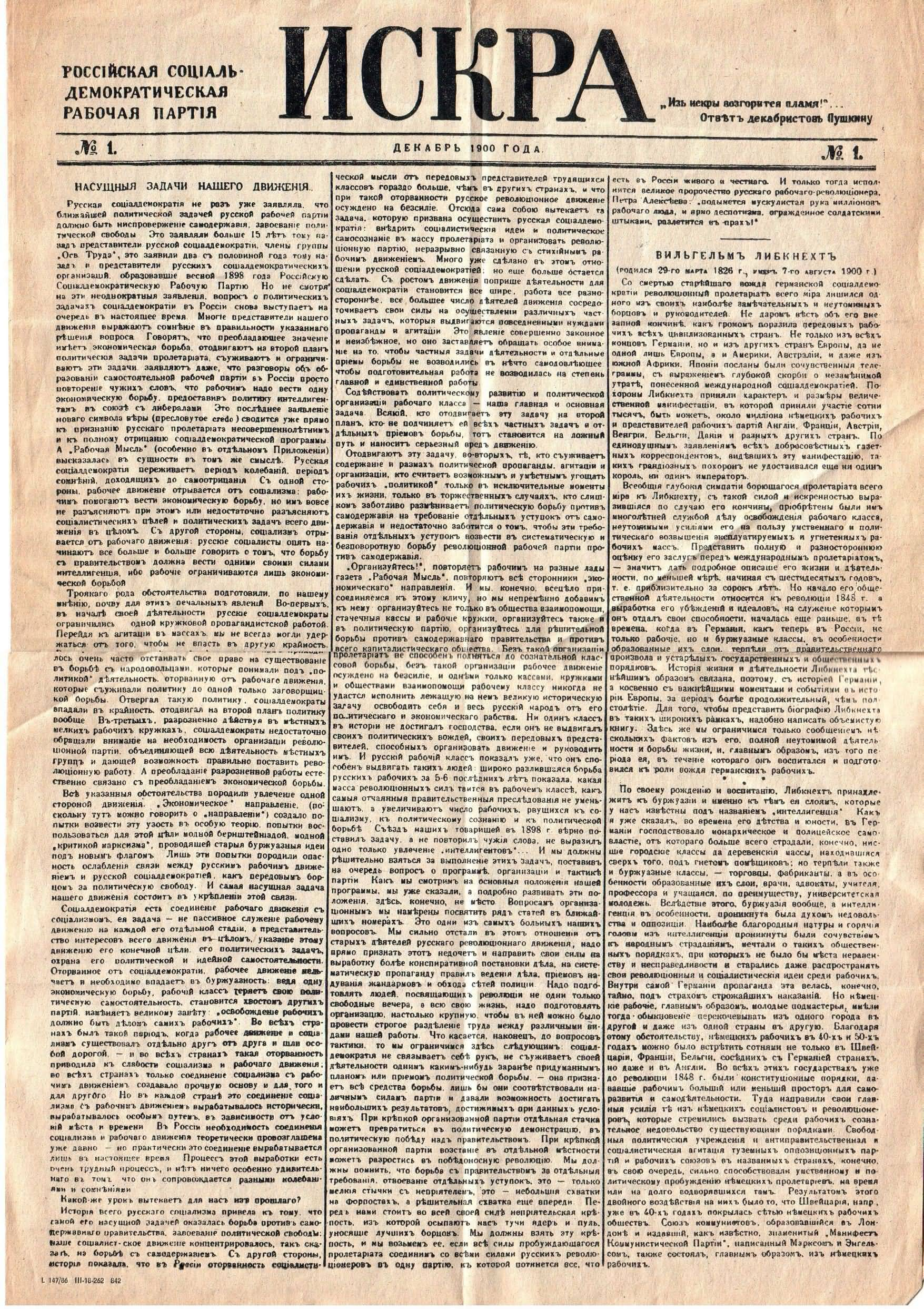
First issue of Iskra, 1900

In 1900, these tensions led to the creation of a new party newspaper, Iskra ('The Spark'), which was intended to serve as the organizing center for a unified Russian Social Democratic party. Zasulich joined its six-person editorial board along with Plekhanov, Axelrod, Vladimir Lenin, Julius Martov, and Alexander Potresov. Initially, the six editors appeared to share a common orthodox Marxist outlook and worked together harmoniously. Zasulich was present at the initial, tense negotiations in Zurich in May 1900, which were nearly torpedoed by a clash between the domineering Plekhanov and the equally stubborn Lenin. Zasulich was initially skeptical of the project, fearing it would lead to more infighting, but was pleased by the collaboration with younger revolutionaries like Lenin, whom she at first found "not only orthodox, but what is more, a Plekhanovite". Once again, she played a crucial role as a mediator, particularly between Plekhanov and Lenin, whose initial clashes threatened to destroy the Iskra project before it began.

=== Second Party Congress ===
At the 2nd Congress of the Russian Social Democratic Labour Party in 1903, the fissures within the Iskra group erupted into a full-blown party split. Zasulich attended as a delegate with an advisory vote but remained largely silent during the public sessions, confining her comments to private meetings of the editors. The central dispute arose over the definition of party membership. Lenin proposed a narrow definition, limiting membership to those who personally participated in a party organization, while Martov proposed a broader one that included anyone who gave the party regular personal assistance under the direction of an organization.

Although Martov's formula initially won, the withdrawal from the Congress of the Jewish Bund and the Economists, who had supported him, shifted the majority to Lenin. Lenin seized the opportunity to propose a reduction of the Iskra editorial board to three members (himself, Martov, and Plekhanov), effectively ousting the other stariki ('old ones') of the board, Zasulich and Axelrod. The move was seen as a "deadly insult to these hallowed names in Social Democracy". Plekhanov sided with Lenin, and the motion passed. This led to the famous division between Lenin's Bolsheviks (majority) and Martov's Mensheviks (minority). Zasulich, along with Martov and Axelrod, became a leader of the Menshevik faction. According to Bergman, Zasulich's silence in the face of her public ouster was not a sign of apathy but a final, self-sacrificing attempt to preserve party unity, even at the cost of her own position.

=== Critique of Leninism ===
Soon after the Congress, Plekhanov broke his alliance with Lenin and invited the old editors, including Zasulich, back to Iskra. The paper became a platform for the Mensheviks to critique Lenin's behavior and ideas. In July 1904, in an article for Iskra, the normally self-effacing Zasulich articulated a powerful critique of Lenin's organizational model, an article titled "The Organization, the Party, the Movement". She argued that Lenin was confusing the concept of a "party" with that of an "organization". A "real life party", she wrote, is not a top-down hierarchy of functions but a broad movement of "people who think and feel in the same way". For Lenin, however, the party was defined not by its shared purpose and ideals but by the centralized structure of a conspiratorial organization. Lenin's model, she warned, would inevitably lead to a dictatorship of a revolutionary elite over the masses.

== Later life and death ==
=== 1905 Revolution and return to Russia ===
Zasulich was energized by the outbreak of the 1905 Russian Revolution, which she saw as the "last and decisive battle for political freedom". After the October Manifesto granted civil liberties and an amnesty for political exiles, she returned to Russia in November 1905, ending nearly three decades of life abroad.

The failure of the revolution seemed to drain her energy, and she subsequently retired from active political life. She settled in St. Petersburg, living a quiet life on a meager income from translations and royalties, and writing her memoirs. Though no longer a central figure, she continued to comment on political events. She supported the "liquidationist" wing of the Menshevik party, which argued for dissolving the clandestine party apparatus in favor of legal work within institutions like the Duma.

=== World War I and October Revolution ===
With the outbreak of World War I in 1914, Zasulich took a "defensist" position, strongly supporting the Russian war effort against what she saw as the threat of German imperialism. She joined Plekhanov's patriotic socialist group, Yedinstvo ('Unity'), and argued that an alliance with the Western democracies was essential for Russia's survival.

She condemned the October Revolution of 1917, which she viewed as a counter-revolutionary coup that perverted the principles of Marxism. In her last article, published in February 1918, she wrote that the Bolsheviks were "not transforming capitalist means of production into socialist ones, but annihilating capital and destroying heavy industry... The hands of Smolny will ruin everything they touch."

In the winter of 1918–1919, Bolshevik soldiers evicted her from her lodgings in the Writers' Home in Petrograd. Though Lenin called the act a "disgrace" and may have tried to help her, she fell ill with pneumonia. Vera Zasulich died on 8 May 1919. The Soviet government, in a display of generosity, covered her funeral expenses. She was buried next to Plekhanov in the Volkovo Cemetery.

== Legacy ==
Vera Zasulich is remembered less as a major political theorist than as a moral icon of the Russian revolutionary movement. Her biographer Jay Bergman concludes she was "simply too decent to be a truly effective revolutionary", lacking the political toughness and ambition of figures like Lenin. Her theoretical writings were often inconsistent, serving primarily to provide an intellectual framework for her deep-seated ethical commitments: social altruism, a belief in the dignity of the underprivileged, and an abhorrence of political conflict.

Her life's dominant theme was the quest for revolutionary unity. She consistently sought to build broad alliances against the autocracy, often sacrificing ideological purity and even her own personal standing for the sake of collaboration. While her efforts frequently ended in failure, her perseverance and personal integrity earned her the profound respect and affection of her contemporaries. Even revolutionaries who were more intelligent or politically astute, Bergman notes, "found in her perseverance in the face of adversity a moral rectitude that made them want to redouble their efforts to create a just and equitable society in Russia". In this sense, while Zasulich herself saw revolutionary virtue embodied in collectives like the party and the proletariat, many of her comrades saw in her the most "tangible and obvious embodiment of revolutionary virtue".

== Works ==
- "Revolutionaries of Bourgeois Background" (1890).
- Jean-Jacques Rousseau: An Essay (1898).
- "The Organization, the Party, the Movement" (1904).

== See also ==
- Nihilist movement
- Vera; or, The Nihilists. This was the first play by Irish writer Oscar Wilde, which is said to be loosely inspired by the life of Vera Zasulich. Though none of Wilde's characters correspond to actual Russian people of the time, it has been suggested that the plot was inspired by Vera's shooting of Trepov. The play was published in 1880 and first performed in New York in 1883.
