= Aizik Aronchik =

Russian politician

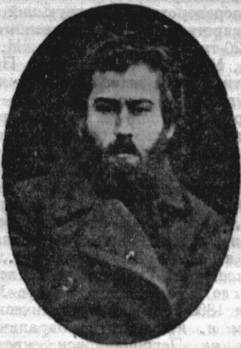
Aizik Aronchik

Aizik Borisovich Aronchik (Russian: Айзик Борисович Арончик; 28 December 1859 – 2 April 1888) was a Russian revolutionary, who took part in a failed attempt to assassinate the Tsar Alexander II.

== Career ==
Aronchik's family were Jewish traders, from Gomel, present day Belarus, he studied at the St Petersburg Institute of Railway Engineers, but dropped out in 1879, without finishing the course, after having made contact with revolutionaries.

He was one of only two revolutionaries entrusted with meeting and exchanging messages with Nikolai Kletochnikov, the revolutionaries' agent inside the police department. In 1879-80, he and a fellow revolutionary, Galina Cheryavskaya posing as a married couple, under the name of Silantiev, occupied a safe house where members of Narodnaya Volya could meet.

In November 1879, he was involved in an attempt by Narodnaya Volya to kill the Tsar by exploding a mine under the Moscow - Kursk railway as his train passed. Aronchik was arrested on 17 March 1881, he was one of the defendants at the Trial of the Twenty. He told the court: "I never distinguished, and don't do so now, between the principles of the Narodnaya Volya and Chernyi Peredel factions. Each is founded on the struggle to bring about a revolution in Russia. I stand with them, though I am socialist first and a revolutionary second."

He was sentenced to life imprisonment. After four years in the Alekseyev Ravelin, he was showing signs of mental illness, and was transferred in August 1884 to Shlisselburg Fortress, where his mental state was compounded by physical illness. He never left his cell, until he died, after prolonged suffering, on 2 April 1888.
