= Kokorev's Manor House =

Complex of buildings of historical significance in Pushkin, Saint Petersburg

- Усадьба Кокорева
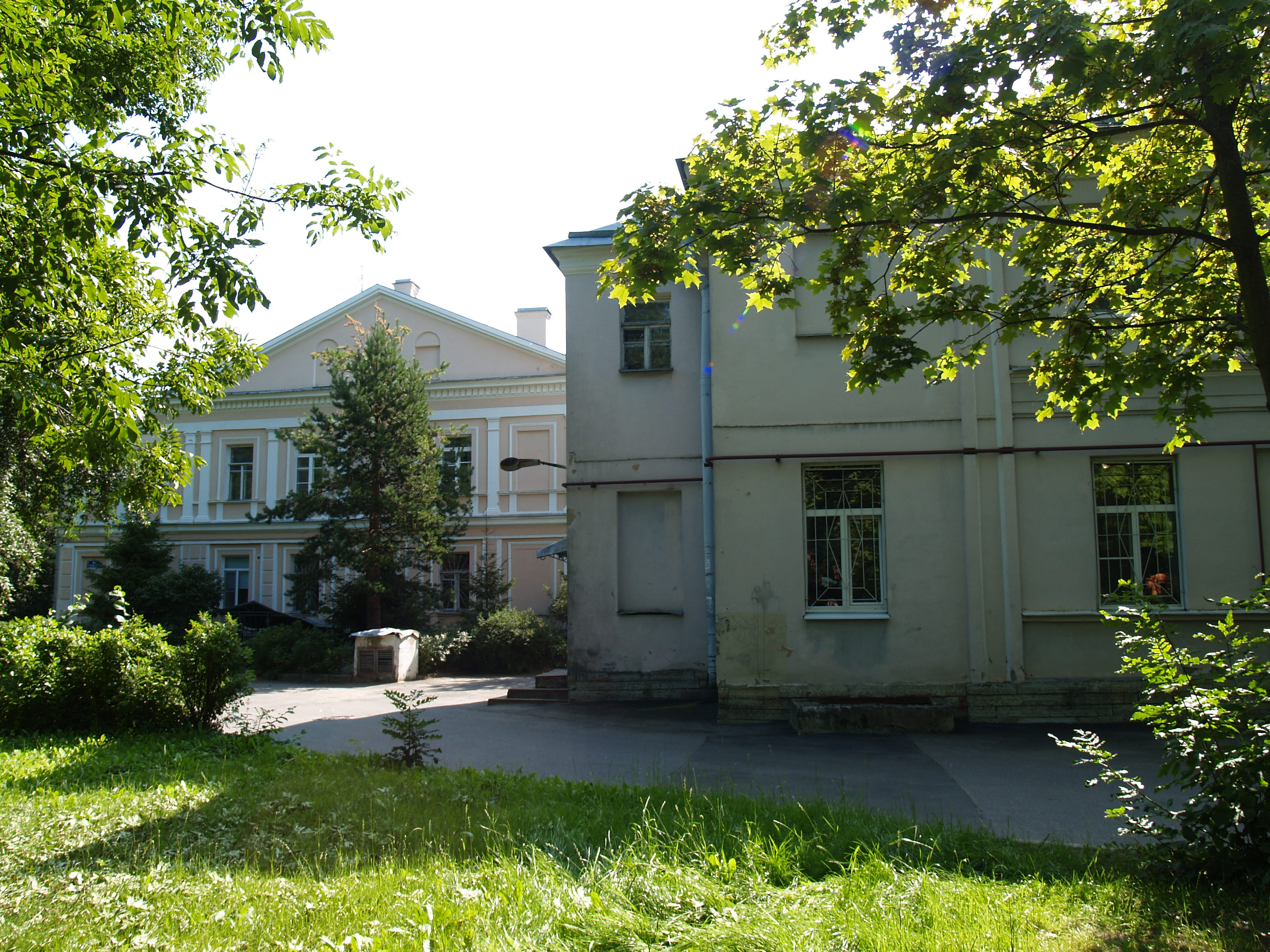
- Interactive map of the Kokorev's Manor House area

General information
- Architectural style: Classicism
- Location: Pushkin, 40, 42, 44 Oktyabrsky Boulevard
- Coordinates: 59°43′15″N 30°25′20″E
- Construction started: 1844
- Completed: 1845

Design and construction
- Architect: V. V. Kokorev

Kokorev's Manor House is a complex of buildings of historical significance in Pushkin, Saint Petersburg. It was built in the period of 1844-1845. Nowadays it is an object of cultural heritage. The building is located at 40, 42, 44 Oktyabrsky Boulevard^{[ru]}.

== V. A. Kokorev ==
Vasily Aleksandrovich Kokorev was a wealthy, 19th-century wine merchant of the 1st Guild, thus being allowed to do domestic and international trade, as well as operate factories, and do sea ferrying work. Thus, he quickly accumulated a large amount of profit, becoming a millionaire, thanks in part to his other business ventures including founding the Volzhsko-Kamsky Bank and leading an extensive railway construction project through the Urals. Along with being a savvy businessman, he was also a patron of the arts and a generous philanthropist, in 1862 opening an Art Gallery in Moscow. Only 4 years later, in 1866 the Alexander Palace would acquire 166 of his collected works. Consequently, 70 of those works would go onto form the foundation for the Russian State Museum in Moscow.

=== Plot Acquirement ===
On the death of his father, son Alexander Vasilyevich (1848-1908) moved to the Alexander Palace as a place of residence. However, in 1901 he bought the land plots where the Manor lied from Nikolai Alexeevich Durasov. On the property, there was already a stone building, kept and added to throughout construction.

=== Construction ===
In 1901-1902 (see photo 2), the Italian architect Silvio Amvrosievich Danini was commissioned to build an addition to the existing structure, of which significantly expanded the size of the home. Additionally added was a greenhouse, situated adjacent to the external courtyard.

=== Current Form ===
Much of the original, external architecture has been preserved. However, several ornamental details have eroded away with time.

== History ==
Data on the construction are contradictory. Officially, the ensemble is called "the estate of V. V. Kokorev." On the other hand, it is stated that it was built for a 6th-grade official, Nikolai Vasilyevich Kokorev. The architect, according to some sources, was the brother of the owner V. V. Kokorev, on the other - A. V. Kokorev (who in 1840 made a project together with the architect D. Efimov). The estate of three stone houses, the main and two outbuildings, as well as two non-preserved wooden service buildings, was erected on site No. 306 in the area called "New Places", in the 1840s. For the passage to the new estate was specially laid 2nd Boulevard lane (it became part of Oktyabrsky Boulevard). Later, the site was owned by merchant of the 1st Guild Henry Antonovich Lepin, for whom AF Vidov built balconies on the house (not preserved). In the 1950s, the manor houses were rebuilt.

== Architecture ==
The facades of the house and wings are decorated in a uniform manner, in the style of late classicism. In their decoration there are floor pilasters and rustic blades. The wings are symmetrical and face the boulevard with narrow facades four doors wide. Others have noted the structure's Neo-Gothic influences, especially with conventional and stylized archivolts, numerous arcature belts, and other notably Italian designs. The external facade is dotted with glazed, jade-colored tiles and are placed in geometric designs sparingly within the building's face. The porticos, enlarged arch vaults, organized window placement, squared-off towers, and various apexes resemble Italian cathedral and Gothic revivalist architecture, along with neo-classical influence in the ordered and impendingly unadorned facade.

== Pictures of the Manor ==
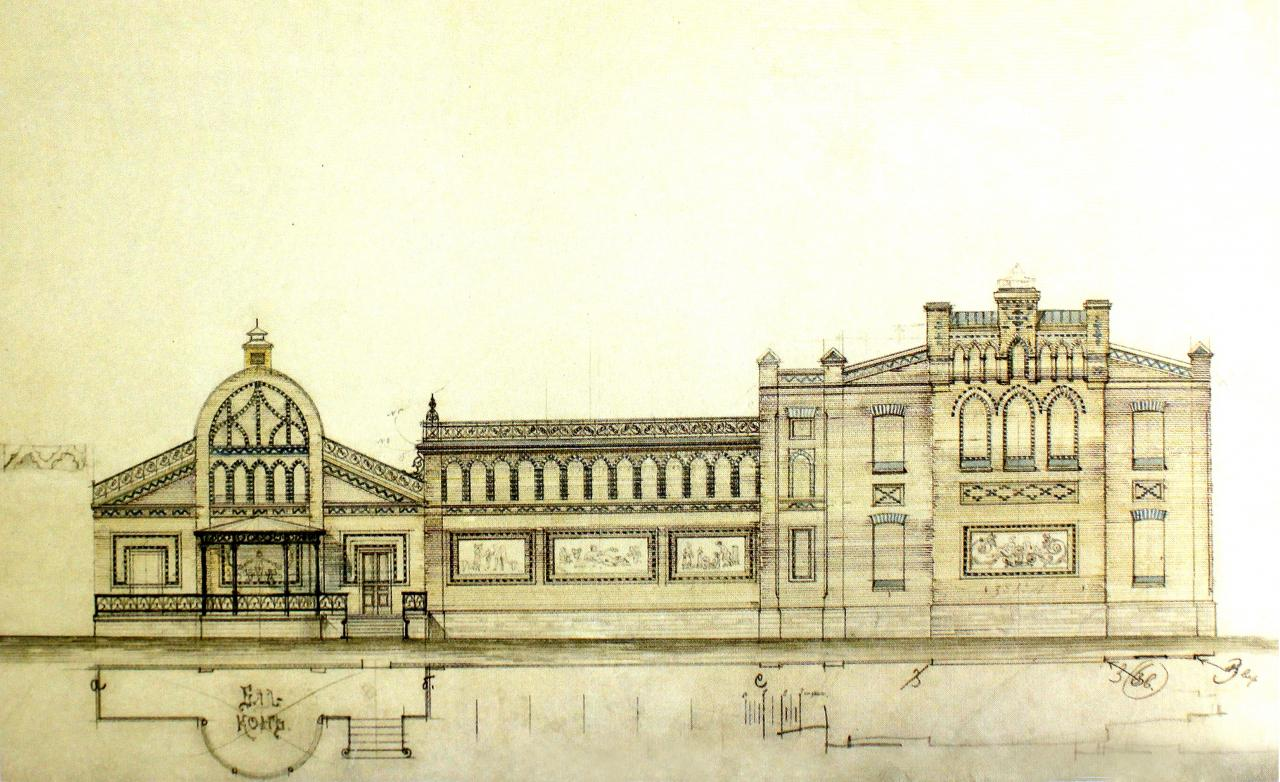
The hand-drawn interior and exterior of the southeastern face and outbuildings by the Petrostroy Corporation in 1901.

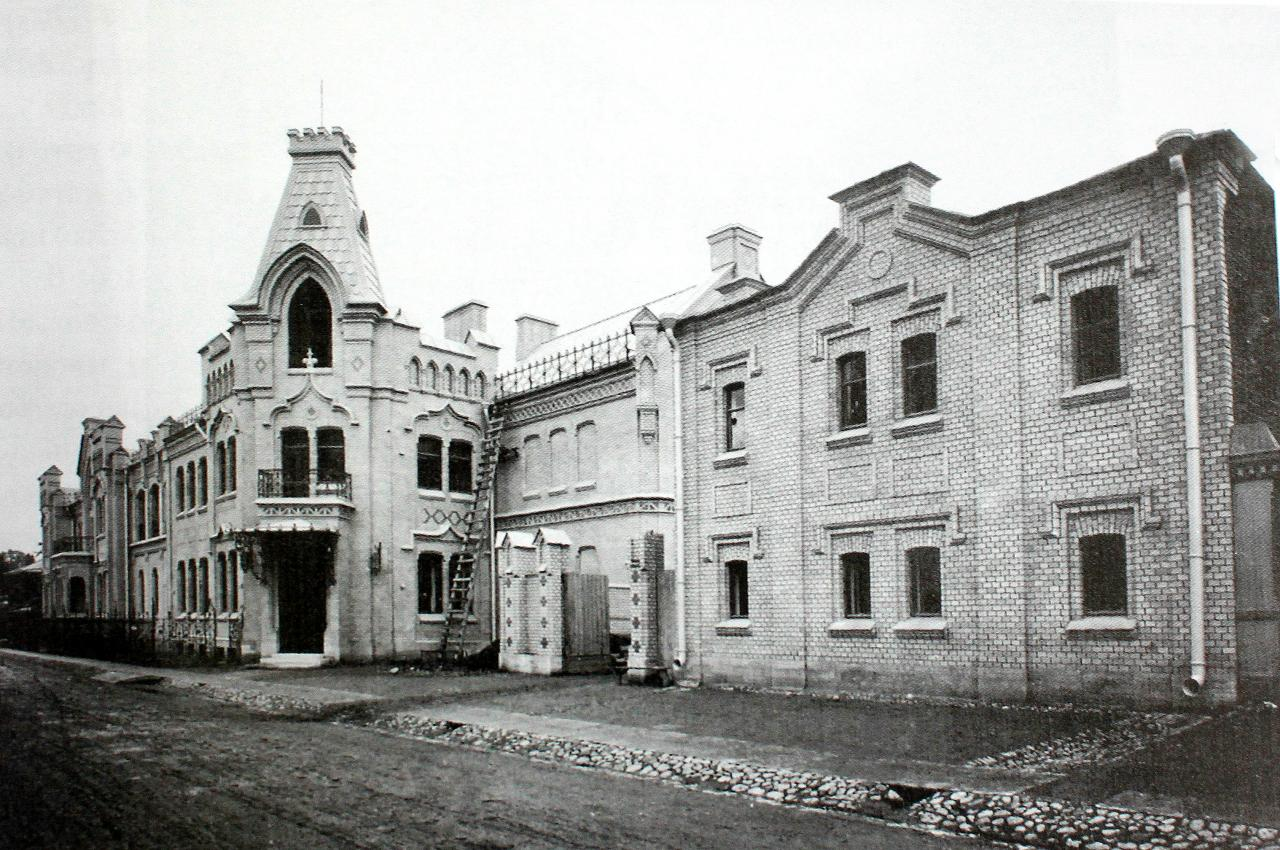
Front facade of Kokorev's Manor House and outbuilding addition, 1901-1902

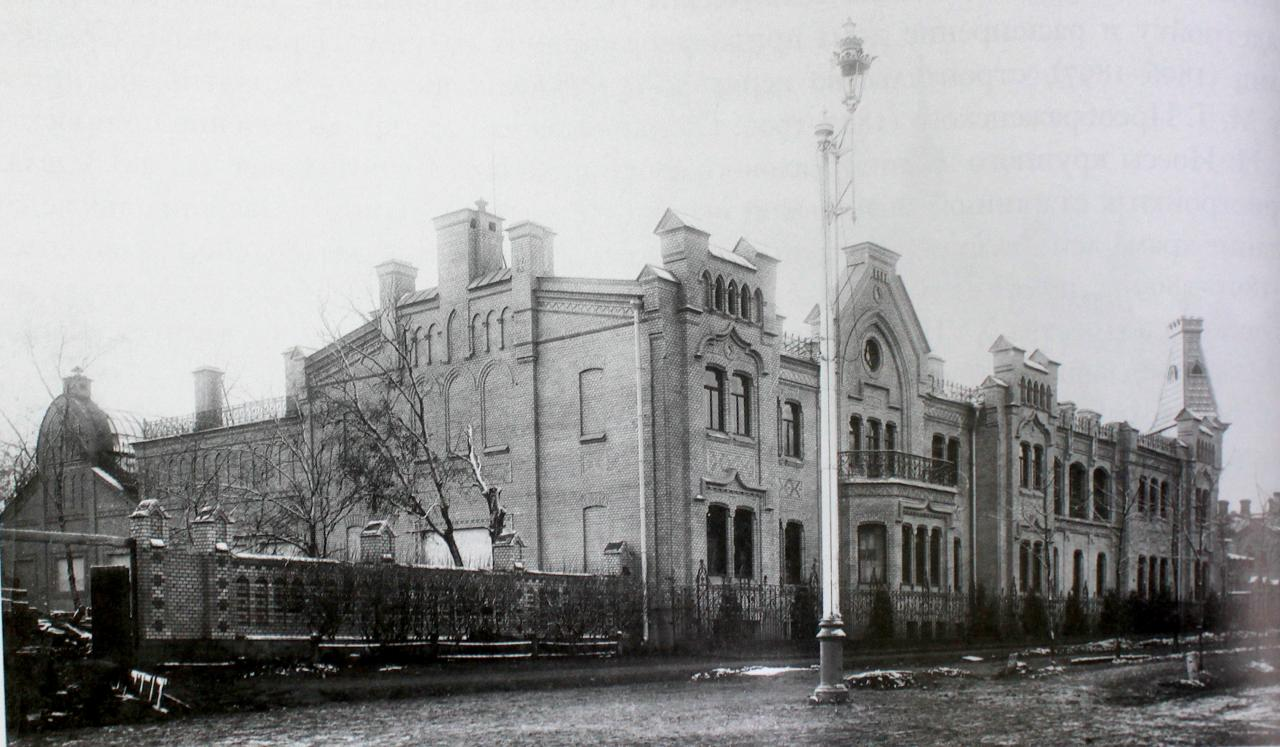
A full facade photograph of V. A. Kokorev's Manor House, shot in 1902.

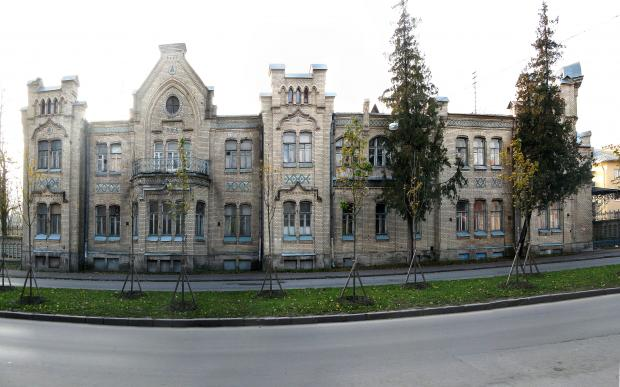
This shows the Kokorev's residence and its front facade in its present form, as shot in 2011 by an in-person photographer.

== Literature ==
- Семенова Г. В. (2009). Царское Село: знакомое и незнакомое. М.: Центрполиграф. p. 291. ISBN 978-5-9524-4249-8.

== See also ==
- Russian architecture
- Pushkin, Saint Petersburg
- Classicism

== Sources ==
- "Октябрьский бульвар 40, 42, 44. Усадьба Кокорева". Энциклопедия Царского Села. Archived from the original on 2018-07-13.
- "Усадьба В. В. Кокорева. Главный дом". citywalls.ru.
