= Fyodor Trepov (senior) =

Russian government official (1809–1889)

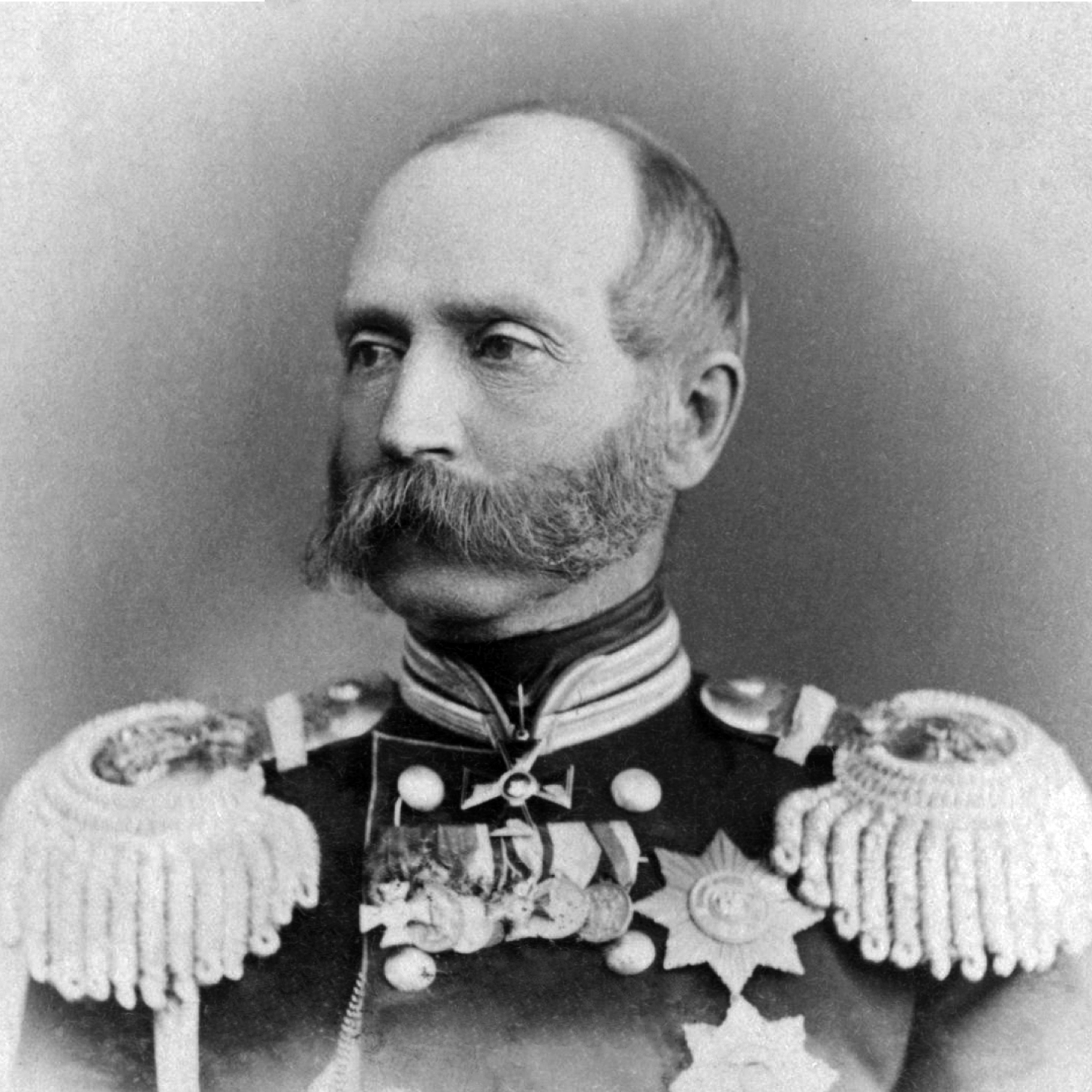
Photo of Fyodor Trepov, 1865

Fedor Fedorovich (Fyodor Fyodorovich) Trepov Senior (Russian: Фёдор Фёдорович Тре́пов) (1809–1889) was a Russian government official. He was a natural child of Friedrich Wilhelm von Stenger (1770–1832) and was registered in the Russian nobility on 4 May 1837.

Feodor Trepov began his military career in 1831 by participating in the suppression of the November Uprising in Poland in 1830 and 1831. He then commanded a cavalry regiment of gendarmes in Kiev. He distinguished himself during the suppression of another uprising in Poland in 1863–1864

After Dmitry Karakozov's assassination attempt on Alexander II in 1866, Trepov was appointed chief of Saint Petersburg's police force. He managed to put the city in order and improved the performance of the police. In 1867, Trepov was promoted to the rank of adjutant general. He was the Lord Mayor of St. Petersburg between 1873 and 1878.

In 1878, Vera Zasulich shot and wounded Trepov after he had ordered the flogging of a political prisoner, Arkhip Bogolyubov. Trepov survived the much publicized assassination attempt and soon retired with the rank of cavalry general.

He was awarded Order of the Cross of Takovo, Order of Prince Danilo I and other decorations.

== Family ==
His wife was Vera Lukasevich. His children were:

- Anastasia Feodorovna Trepova (1849-1940) was married with Maximilian Karl von Nieroth (1846–1914)
- Feodor Feodorovich Trepov (junior) (1854–1938) last governor of Kiev (1908–1914) (in many cases father and son have been confused with one another)
- Dmitri Feodorovich Trepov (1855–1906) chief of police of Moscow 1896-1905, gov.gen. of Saint-Petersburg 12.01.1905-14.04.1905
- Vladimir Feodorovich Trepov (1860–1918) member of the State Council
- Alexander Trepov (1862–1928) Minister for transports, President of the ministers council 23.11.1916-9.01.1917
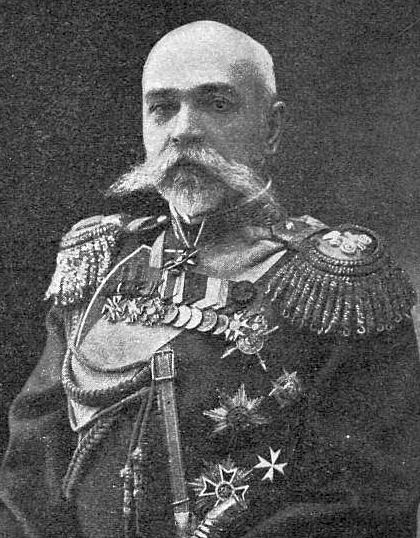
Fedor Fedorovich Trepov in 1915

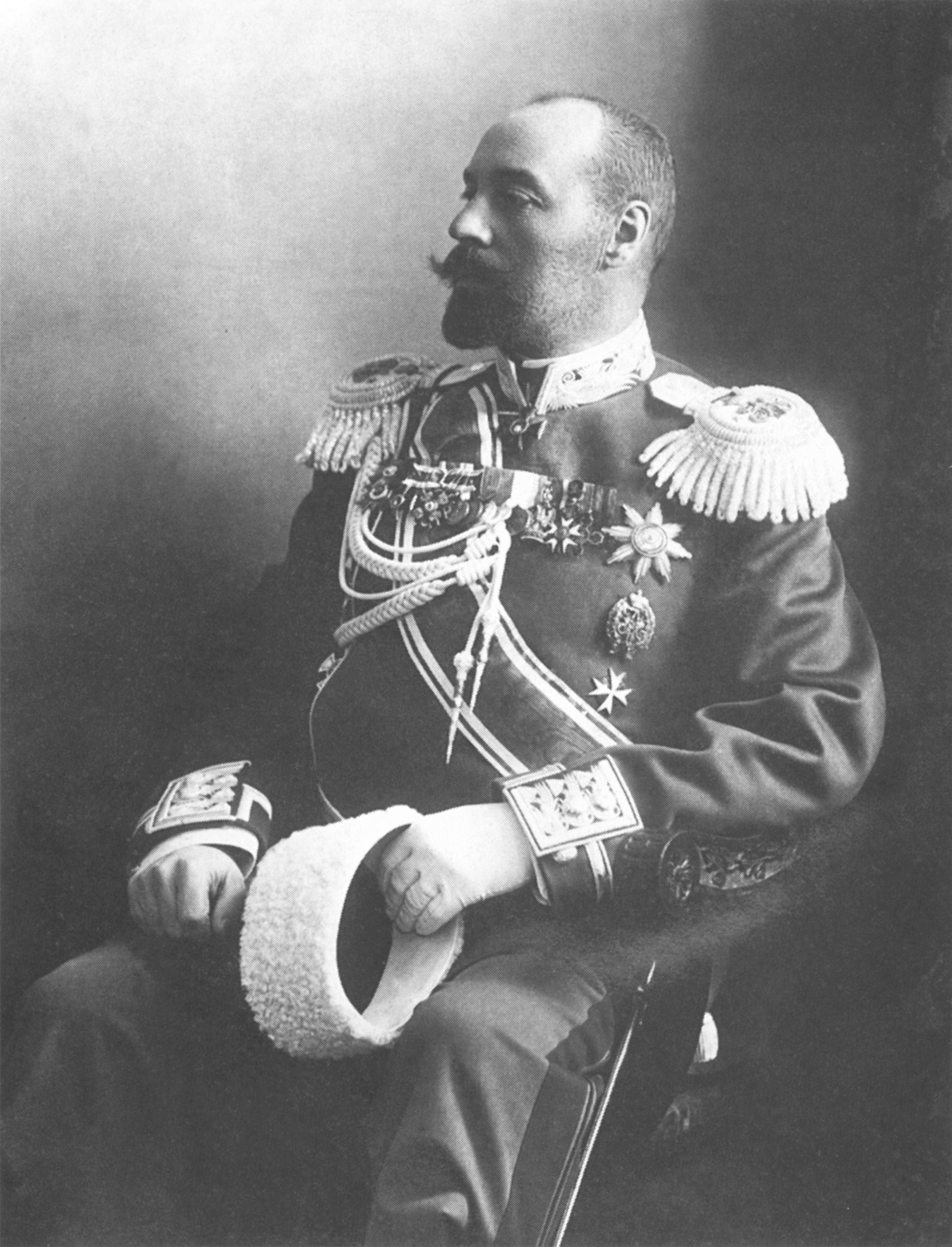
Dmitri Feodorovich Trepov. 1905.

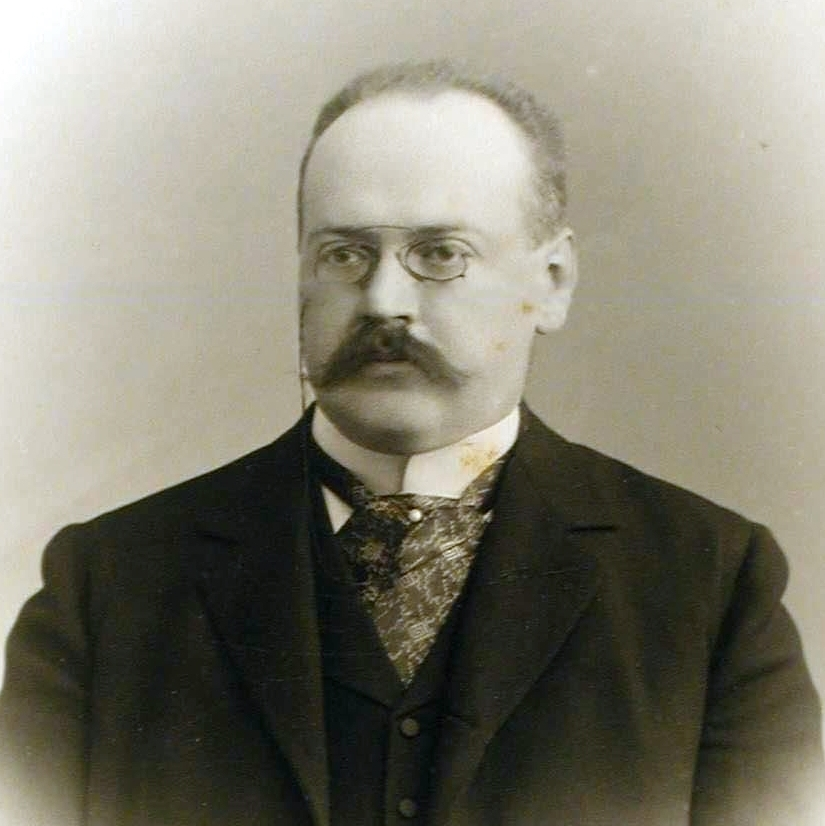
Alexander Trepov.

== Notes and references ==
In-line:

Preceded by Iosif Lutkovskiy	Governor of Saint Petersburg; 1873–1878	Succeeded by Sergey Tol
