= Jay Bergman (historian) =

American professor of history

- Education: Yale University
- Scientific career
- Fields: History of Russia
- Workplaces: Central Connecticut State University

Jay Bergman is an American professor of history at the Central Connecticut State University (CCSU). He is a member of the board of directors of the National Association of Scholars and president of its Connecticut affiliate. In 2009 he became a member of the Connecticut Advisory Committee to the United States Commission on Civil Rights.

== Biography ==
Jay Bergman received his B.A. in history with honors from Brandeis University, and then his M.A., M. Phil. (1973) and PhD (1977) from Yale University. Bergman taught at Virginia Commonwealth University, the University of Miami, and Albright College, and in 1990 he joined the faculty at CCSU as an associate professor.

== Academia ==
His teaching interests include modern Russian history and other topics related to USSR and communist party. He is the author of The French Revolutionary Tradition in Russian and Soviet Politics, Political Thought, and Culture (Oxford, UK: Oxford University Press, 2019), Meeting the Demands of Reason: The Life and Thought of Andrei Sakharov (Ithaca, NY: Cornell University Press, 2009) and Vera Zasulich: A Biography (Stanford, CA: Stanford University Press, 1983; Japanese edition, 1986).
