= Nikolai Kletochnikov =

Russian revolutionary (1847–1883)

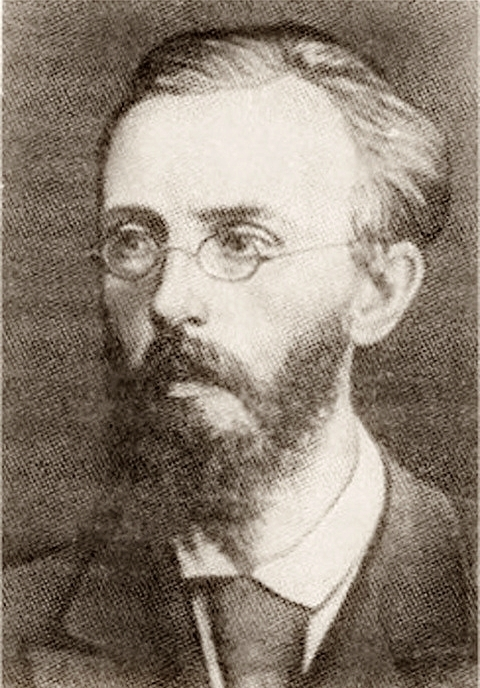
Nikolai Kletochnikov

Nikolai Vasilievich Kletochnikov (Russian: Николай Васильевич Клеточников) (1847 – 13 July 1883) was a Russian revolutionary who volunteered to join the police to act as a source of inside information. Already terminally ill when he volunteered to help the revolutionaries, he died in prison.

== Career ==
Nikolai Kletochnikov was born in Penza, Russian Empire, into the minor nobility. His father was an architect. After graduating from the Penza gymnasium, he enrolled in St Petersburg University, but left after two years, after contracting tuberculosis. He moved to Crimea to work as a clerk. In 1873, he received a small inheritance from his parents, which he spent on a trip abroad, where he studied politics and living conditions in Europe. In 1877, he entered the St Petersburg Medical-Surgical Academy, hoping to make contact with radicals and become a revolutionary, but ill health forced him to return to Simferopol, and then Penza.

In 1878, Kletochnikov returned to St Petersburg and contacted A.D.Mikhailov, the leading organiser of the illegal socialist society, Zemlya i volya ("Land and Liberty") and volunteered to commit any act of terrorism as directed. Mikhailov persuaded him, instead, to enlist as an employee of the Third Section, or Okhrana, the organisation that hunted revolutionaries. He joined the service in January 1879, and in March was promoted to a position in the intelligence unit. There he impressed his superiors by his willingness to work hard, and with his excellent calligraphic handwriting, and was given the task of copying important documents. By memorising names, dates and other details, he was able to warn the revolutionaries of impending arrests and the identities of police informants.

When Zemlya i volia, Kletochnikov transferred his allegiance to Narodnaya Volya, which was planning and eventually carried out the assassination of the Tsar Alexander II, of which Mikhailov was the main organiser.

Kletnochikov was arrested in 1881, when he was hurrying to warn one of the revolutionaries of an impending arrest and walked into a police raid. In his initial interrogation, he told the police that he had been paid to act as a spy, which was untrue. At the Trial of the 20, in 1882, he was sentenced to death, but his sentence was commuted to life imprisonment. Already terminally ill, he went on hunger strike in July 1883 while being held in solitary confinement in the Alexis Ravelin of Peter and Paul Fortress. He died on 13 July 1883.
