= Ippolit Myshkin =

Russian politician (1848–1885)

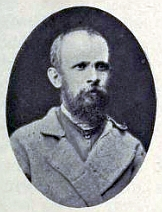
Ippolit Myshkin

Ippolit Nikitich Myshkin (Russian language: Ипполит Никитич Мышкин; 3 February 1848 - 7 February 1885) was a Russian revolutionary and political prisoner in the Russian Empire. After a failed attempt to rescue writer and philosopher Nikolay Chernyshevsky from exile, he was imprisoned multiple times and made several escapes and escape attempts. He was executed after a violent confrontation with a prison warder.

== Early life ==
Myshkin was born in Pskov. His father was a non-commissioned officer; his mother was a peasant. Educated at a local school in Kiev, he entered a teacher training college in Saint Petersburg in 1860, but despite being the best student in his year, he was barred from becoming a teacher because of his lowly birth, or as he put it, he was “suddenly expelled, disgraced, just because I am a soldier’s son.”

After graduating in 1864, he worked for the General Staff Academy of the Imperial Russian Army, and learned shorthand. In 1868, he started work as a court reporter, and used money saved from his salary to set up an illegal printing press in Moscow, which was used to print revolutionary literature.

== Revolutionary career ==
In 1875, Myshkin set out on a lone mission to rescue the writer, Nikolai Chernyshevsky, from exile. He travelled more than 3,200 miles to Irkutsk, where he enlisted as a police officer, created forged documents that instructed him to accompany Chernyshevsky to Blagoveshchenka, stole a captain’s uniform, and travelled to Vilyuysk, where Chernyshevsky had been exiled. He aroused suspicion because it would have been highly unusual for so prominent a prisoner to be moved with just a single escort, and he was told that he would have to get written authorisation from the provincial governor, in Yakutsk. He was accompanied on the road by three armed Cossacks, but broke free, wounded one of them in an exchange of shots, and hid out in the Siberian forest for a week, before he was captured.

After several months of solitary confinement in a prison in Irkutsk, Myshkin was taken under heavy guard to Saint Petersburg, where he was a defendant at the Trial of the 193. In court, he made a defiant speech, that was subsequently published and distributed illegally. He said:

This is not a tribunal but a useless comedy; or something worse, something more repulsive, more shameful than a brothel. There, a woman sells her own body out of necessity. Here, senators trade with the lives of others, with truth and with justice; trade in fact with all that is dearest to humanity out of cowardice, baseness, opportunism, and to gain large salaries.

The essential task of the social-revolutionary party is to build on the ruins of the existing state-bourgeois regime a social organisation which satisfies the demands of the people ... It can be brought about only through a revolution, because the power of the state prevents any peaceful means being used for this end...

He continued speaking, despite being ordered by the President of the court to be quiet. The upshot, according to a fellow revolutionary, Vera Figner, was that "the court retired; the gendarmes rushed to Myshkin to take him out of the hall, and the defendants rushed to defend their comrade. So, among the general scream and hysterical sobbing of women, there was a scuffle, unheard of in the annals of the court."

Myshkin was sentenced to ten years’ hard labour, and was sent to Kharkiv prison, where he attempted to escape by digging a tunnel at night, leaving a dummy in his bed to deceive the prison warders. He was discovered when a prison officer visited his cell at an unusual hour, and was moved to a more secure cell. Fearing he would go insane in solitary confinement, he attacked the prison governor during a Sunday church service, but escaped unpunished because there was an investigation at the time into the large inmates dying or going insane in Kharkiv prison.

== Siberian exile ==
Myshkin was one of a group of political prisoners transferred from Kharkiv to Kara, in East Siberia. One of the group, named Dmokhovsky, died on the way. During his funeral serviced in the prison church in Irkutsk, Myshkin made an impromptu speech, praising the dead man and quoting lines by the poet Nikolay Nekrasov. For making what was regarded as a revolutionary speech in a sacred building, he was sentenced to a further 15 years. George Kennan, an American who visited Siberia in the 1880s, was told that Myshkin was “a born orator who never made but two speeches in his life; one cost him ten years of penal servitude, the other fifteen.”

He was incarcerated in Kara prison, where he organised a break out by eight political prisoners in April 1882. Most were quickly recaptured, but Myshkin and a worker named Nikolai Khrushchev, reached Vladivostok, more than 1,000 miles away but were arrested there. Back in Kara, Myshkin acted as spokesman for 73 political prisoners who went on hunger strike, in July, in protest against the flogging of a fellow prisoner, a common criminal, and on tightened restrictions in the prison. In retaliation, the authorities removed eight of the prisoners to the Peter and Paul Fortress, in Saint Petersburg.

== Death ==
In 1884, Myshkin was transferred to the Shlisselburg Fortress, where prisoners were held in solitary confinement, and a notice in their cells warned that they would be executed if they resisted the prison staff. According to a fellow prisoner, Vera Figner:

In December, on Christmas Day, the whole prison was shocked by a scene that took place in one of the cells. As our supper was brought to us, we heard a crash of metal dishes falling to the floor, sounds of scuffling, and a nervous, half-strangled voice crying, "Don't beat me! Don't! Kill me, but don't beat me!" This was Myshkin.

Myshkin had apparently staged the incident expecting to be executed, but hoping that it would stir up resistance by other prisoners and that he would be given a public trial in which he could draw attention to conditions in the fortress. In the event, according to Figner, the other prisoners did not know what was happening because they were not allowed to communicate with each other or the outside world. Myshkin was executed by firing squad on 7 February 1885.
