= Trial of the 193 =

1870s criminal trials in Tsarist Russia

The Trial of the 193 was a series of criminal trials held in Russia in 1877–1878 under the rule of Tsar Alexander II. The defendants were 193 socialist students and other "revolutionaries" charged with populist "unrest" and propaganda against the Russian Empire. The Trial of the 193 was the largest political trial in the history of Tsarist Russia. It coincided with a phase in the Russo-Turkish War when the Russian army was stalled outside Pleven, killing hopes of a swift victory and so undermining support for the government, and there was widespread disgust at the order given by Governor of St Petersburg, General Trepov, to flog an imprisoned student, Arkhip Bogolyubov. The Tsar's brother, Grand Duke Konstantin, advised postponing the trial, but the Minister for Justice, Count Konstantin Pahlen, ignored his advice.

With the help of a team of skillful defence lawyers, the trial ended in mass acquittals, with only a small percentage being punished with sentences of hard labor or prison,; yet the number of accused and investigated who either "committed suicide, or went mad, or died" during the 4-year period of the investigations and the trial itself rose to 75 by its end; this consequently led to an increase in violent militancy among formerly peaceful revolutionaries.

== Background ==
In the "Mad Summer of 1874" thousands of socialist students and other youth called Narodnichestvo (peasant populism) took to the countryside to educate local peasants on issues of the government in hopes of making a more militant peasantry. The peasantry (though often receptive to the revolutionaries' ideas) have been said to have turned them over to the authorities; an alternate explanation of the behavior of the peasants was given by Ukrainian revolutionary leader Sergei Stepniak in 1882:

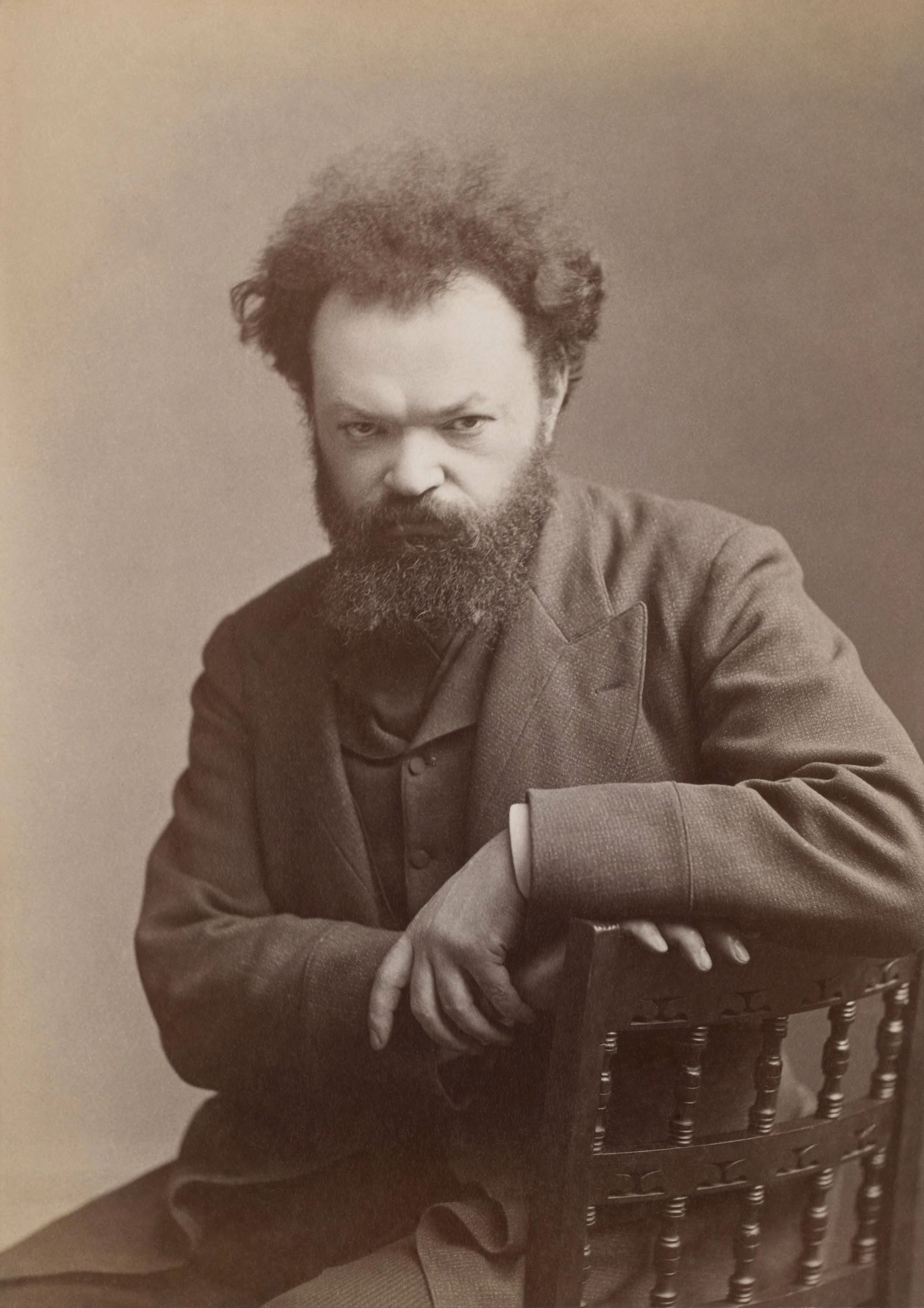
Sergei Stepniak

[T]he peasant is absolutely incapable of keeping secret the propaganda in his midst. How can you expect him not to speak to his neighbour, whom he has known for so many years, of a fact so extraordinary as the reading of a book, especially when it concerns a matter which appears to him so just, good, and natural as that which the Socialist tells him about? Thus, whenever a propagandist visits any of his friends, the news immediately spreads throughout the village, and half an hour afterwards the hovel is full of bearded peasants, who hasten to listen to the newcomer without warning either him or his host. When the hovel is too little to hold all this throng, he is taken to the communal house, or into the open air, where he reads his books, and makes his speeches under the roof of heaven. It is quite evident that, with these customs, the Government would have no difficulty in hearing of the agitation which was being carried on among the peasants. Arrest followed arrest thick and fast.

In 1876, a demonstration in St. Petersburg led to further arrests. One of the arrested Arkhip Bogolyubov was flogged for failing to raise his cap when the governor of St Petersburg, General Trepov visited the prison, and went insane.

== The arrests ==
In reaction to these demonstrations and the general social foment, Tsar Alexander II came to the conclusion that mass arrests and trials were necessary to halt the revolutionaries and discredit their fight. The result was mass arrests, often on the basis of flimsy evidence. Most of the arrested were drawn from Russia's expanding educated middle class, though one of the most active propagandists, Porfiry Voynaralsy, was the illegitimate son of a princess. According to Stepniak:

The merest suspicion led to arrest. An address; a letter from a friend who had gone 'among the people'; a word let fall by a lad of twelve who, from excess of fear, knew not what to reply, were sufficient to cast the suspected person into prison, where he languished for years and years, subjected to all the rigour of the Russian [prison] system. To give an idea of this it need only be mentioned that, in the course of the investigations in the trial of the 193, which lasted four years, the number of the prisoners who committed suicide, or went mad, or died, reached 75.

One of the arrested was a student named Ponomarev, from Saratov, whose name was found on a ticket when police arrested Porfiry Voynaralsky, in 1874. During the trial, the defence counsel, Dmitry Stasov, was allowed to see the ticket, and demonstrated that the police had misread the name. By then, Ponomarev had spent three years in prison.

== The trial ==
The Trial of the 193 was open for public viewing and for full press coverage, as the Tsar's reforms of the legal system allowed it to be so. The trial served as a staging ground and audience for the prisoners to perform well-rehearsed speeches and allowed them to gain the support of public opinion. Prisoners also shouted abuses at the judges, who from time to time had to postpone court due to the lack of control over the prisoners. The most serious incident was a scuffle that broke out when gendarmes tried to force the defendant Ippolit Myshkin to stop haranguing the court.

== Outcome ==
Punishments resulting from the trials themselves were severe (as was to be expected of the Tsarist government of that era): out of 193 defendants, three died during the course of the trial; five, including Myshkin and Voynaralsky, were sentenced to ten years' hard labour; ten to nine years; and three to five years; forty were exiled to Siberia.

But about two thirds were acquitted. This of course meant that a great majority of the political prisoners rounded up in the mass arrests ordered by Tsar Alexander II were held in captivity for possibly years without sufficient evidence for a conviction. It also meant that dozens of young radicals were set free, many of whom were hardened by their time in prison. Vera Figner, whose sister Lyida was one of those arrested, described the atmosphere in St Petersburg immediately after the trial:

We found great hilarity. The youth of the nation rejoiced. Old friends and new welcomed the released as though they were returned from the dead, while they, exhausted and shattered physically, forgetting the sufferings that they had just endured, dreamed with the ardour of youth, and of long-restrained energy, of fresh labours for the cause ... It was an interrupted session of a revolutionary club.

The overall effect of the arrests and the mismanaged trial was to turn the populist movement from peaceful protest to violent terrorism. The day after the trial ended, General Trepov was shot and seriously injured by Vera Zasulich in retaliation for the flogging of Bogolyubov. Several of the defendants who were acquitted went on to be members of Narodnaya Volya, the organisation that assassinated the Tsar Alexander II, including Sofia Perovskaya and Andrei Zhelyabov.
