= Mikhail Frolenko =

Ukrainian revolutionary and populist

Mikhail Fedorovich Frolenko
- Михаил Фёдорович Фроленко
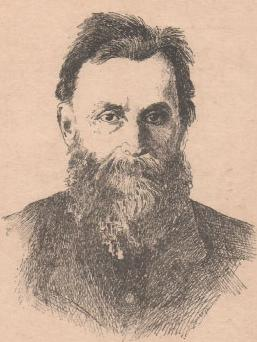

Personal details
- Born: November 1848 Stavropol, Russian Empire
- Died: February 18, 1938 (aged 89) Moscow, Soviet Union
- Citizenship: Russian Empire; Soviet Union
- Party: People's Will; All–Union Communist Party (Bolsheviks)
- Occupation: Professional revolutionary
- Known for: Narodism, communism

Mikhail Fedorovich Frolenko (Russian: Михаил Фёдорович Фроленко; November 1848 – February 18, 1938) was a Ukrainian revolutionary, populist, and a member of the Executive Committee of the People's Will, who was implicated in the assassination of the Tsar Alexander II.

== Biography ==
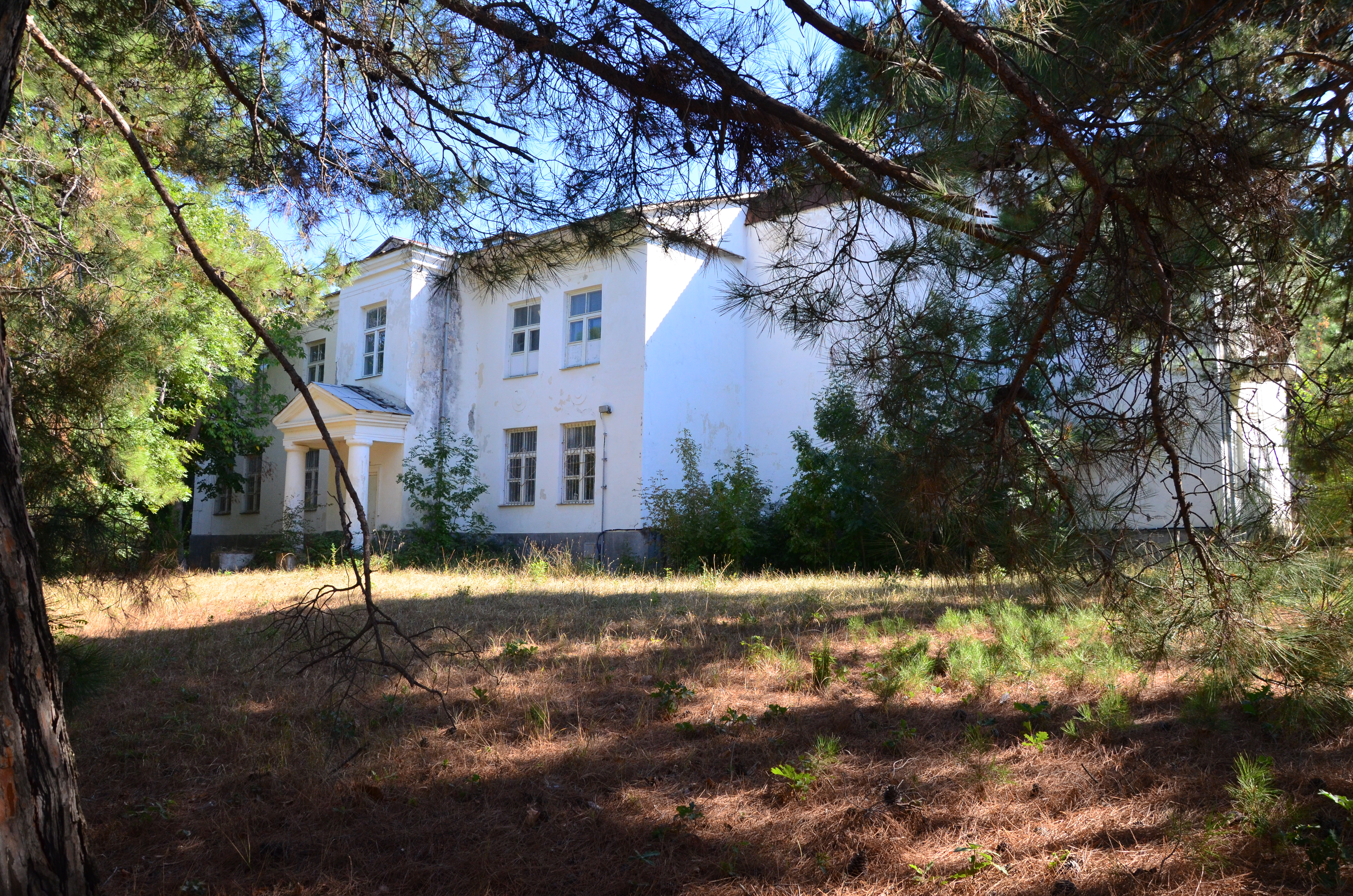
The house in which the prominent revolutionary populist Frolenko lived

He was the son of a retired sergeant major. In 1870 he graduated from the Stavropol Gymnasium, then studied at the Petersburg Institute of Technology, from 1871 at the Petrovsky Agricultural Academy in Moscow.

In 1873–1874, Frolenko was a member of the Moscow circle of Tchaikovites, conducted propaganda among the workers, and participated in "going to the people" in the Urals. Since 1874, he was in an illegal situation. In 1876, he travelled to St Petersburg to ask revolutionaries for money to organise a revolt he was planning to set off in Yelizavetgrad, in Ukraine, but was turned away. Since 1878, a member of the society "Land and Liberty", a participant in the Lipetsk and Voronezh congresses.

In 1877, Frolenko successfully helped a fellow revolutionary, Viktor Kostyurin, escape from prison. In 1878, he organised the escape of three other revolutionaries, Leo Deutsch, Yakov Stefanovich, and Ivan Bokhanovsky, from Kyiv prison. Using a false passport, he obtained a post as an odd-job man, and within two months was promoted to the post of warder, and then, by an elaborate ruse, arranged to be put in charge of the corridor where the three prisoners were held. On the night of the planned escape, he brought them a change of clothes, unlocked their cells, and the four of them walked out, where a fellow revolutionary, Valerian Osinsky was waiting with a coach and horses.

After Osinsky had been arrested and hanged, Frolenko planned to kill General Eduard Totleben, Governor of Odesa, in revenge, but was unable to organise the attempt, and decided that assassinating officials was a side issue, and the more important target was the Tsar, and he moved to St Petersburg to join "Narodnaya Volya", and was co-opted onto its executive committee, and became the husband, or lover, of a fellow revolutionary, Tatyana Lebedeva.

In November 1879, Frolenko and Lebedeva moved into a cabin close to the railway line outside Odesa where they stored a large quantity with the intention of blowing up the Tsar's train, but the plan was called off.

In February, the revolutionaries opened a cheese shop on Malaya Sadovaya street, St Petersburg, on a route frequently used by the Tsar on Sundays. Frolenko posed as proprietor of the shop, and was assigned to set off a huge explosion as the Tsar's cortege passed, in which he could expect to be buried under the rubble. Vera Figner saw him on the day when the assassination was scheduled to take place, and recalled:

At ten o'clock Frolenko came to see me. With astonishment I saw him take a package that he had brought with him, a bottle of red wine and a sausage, which he put on the table, preparing to have a little lunch. In my state of intense excitement, after our decision and the sleepless night spent in preparations, it seemed to me to eat and drink was impossible. "What are you doing?" I asked, almost with horror, as I beheld this matter-of-fact procedure on the part of a man who was destined to an almost certain death under the ruin caused by the explosion. "I must be in full possession of my strength," calmly replied my comrade.

However, the Tsar did not take the expected route, but was killed by a team of bomb throwers led by Sophia Perovskaya. Frolenko was arrested on March 17, 1881, in Saint Petersburg, during the massive police operation that followed the assassination, and was sentenced to death at the Trial of the 20. His sentence was later commuted to life imprisonment, which he served in the Alekseevsky ravelin, in the Peter and Paul Fortress, and from 1884, in the Shlisselburg Fortress. He was released in October 1905, during the 1905 revolution.

In 1908–1917, he lived in Gelendzhik under the supervision of the police, collaborated in the magazine "Byloye".

Since 1922 – in Moscow, a member of the Society of Former Political Prisoners and Exiled Settlers and the editorial board of the journal "Hard Labour and Exile".

In 1936, he joined the All-Union Communist Party (b).

He was buried at the Novodevichy Cemetery in Moscow.

== Works ==
- Notes of the Seventies – Moscow, 1927 – 339 Pages

== Family ==
Wives:

- Tatyana Lebedeva – in 1879–1881;
- Anna Pomerantseva (1860–1924) – social activist, doctor, teacher.

== Recognition of merit ==
After the October Revolution, in 1922, a personal pension of 50,000 rubles was assigned, which at that time with monstrous inflation was not a significant amount. After 11 years, there was an increase in pension according to the Decree of the Council of People's Commissars of the Soviet Union:

"The Council of People's Commissars of the Soviet Union decides:

Increase the personal pension to the participants of the terrorist attack on March 1, 1881: Vera Nikolaevna Figner, Anna Vasilyevna Yakimova–Dikovskaya, Mikhail Fedorovich Frolenko, Anna Pavlovna Pribyleva–Korba and Fani Abramovna Moreynis–Muratova – up to 400 rubles a month from January 1, 1933.

February 8, 1933, Moscow, the Kremlin".
