= Nikolay Speshnev =

Russian political activist (1821–1882)

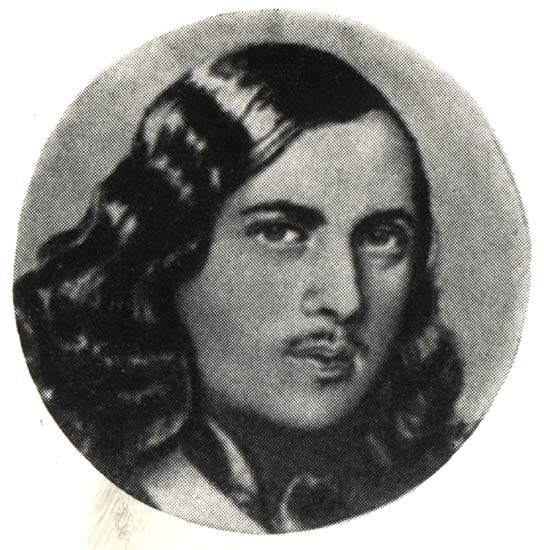
Nikolay Alexandrovich Speshnev

Nikolay Alexandrovich Speshnev (Russian: Николай Александрович Спе́шнев; 6 October 1821, Kursk – 29 March 1882, St. Petersburg) was a 19th-century Russian aristocrat and political activist, best known for his involvement with the pro-socialist literary discussion group the Petrashevsky Circle. He formed a secret revolutionary society from among the members of the circle, which included the young Fyodor Dostoevsky. After the government of Tsar Nicholas I arrested the members of the Petrashevsky Circle in 1849, Speshnev was interrogated, threatened with torture, and eventually sentenced, along with Dostoevsky, Petrashevsky and others, to execution by firing squad. The sentence was commuted to hard labour in Siberia, but the prisoners were only informed of this after enduring a mock execution.

Dostoevsky drew on his experiences with Speshnev's secret society and the Petrashevsky Circle when writing his socio-political satire Demons. The novel's central character—Nikolay Stavrogin—is thought by many commentators to be partly based on Speshnev.

== Biography ==
Speshnev was born in the Kursk province in 1821 into a very wealthy noble family. He attended the elite Alexander Lyceum at Tsarskoye Selo, where he first met Petrashevsky.

From 1842 to 1847 he lived and travelled in Europe. While abroad he studied a number of political philosophers including Feuerbach, Marx and Proudhon, and was influenced by the amoralist egoism of Max Stirner. In Dresden and Paris he associated with Polish émigrés opposed to Russian rule, which piqued his interest in the techniques of underground conspiracy. He studied Buonarroti's History of Babeuf's ‘Conspiracy of Equals' , a handbook on conspiratorial tactics, and Abbé Barruel's Memoirs Illustrating the History of Jacobinism, which described the Masons and Jacobins' alleged secret orchestration of the French Revolution. Speshnev is thought to have participated in the Sonderbund War in Switzerland in 1843, fighting on the side of the liberal Cantons.

By the time of his return to Petersburg, Speshnev had become something of a legend as both a revolutionary and a Byronic romantic. A reputation as a libertine did not prevent him from being a determined and forceful campaigner for the socialist cause. He attended the meetings of the Petrashevsky Circle but, dissatisfied with Petrashevsky's lack of commitment to positive action, assembled his own secret society from among its members. In April 1849 Speshnev, along with the other members of the Petrashevsky Circle, was arrested by the tsarist government and confined in the Peter and Paul Fortress. In December of the same year, the prisoners were taken to Semonovsky Square for execution by firing squad. Just as the first shots were about to be fired, a message from the tsar arrived commuting the sentences to hard labour in Siberia.

Originally sent to Tobolsk, Speshnev served most of his ten year sentence at the Nerchinsky mines. He was granted amnesty in 1856 but had to remain in exile and served in the local administration for a time before settling in Irkutsk. Here he befriended the renowned liberal governor-general of Eastern Siberia, Nikolay Muravyov-Amursky, and became part of his administration. Muravyev was the second cousin of the anarchist philosopher and exile Mikhail Bakunin, upon whom Speshnev also made a strong impression. In a letter to Herzen, Bakunin described him as "intelligent, cultivated, handsome, aristocratic in bearing, not at all standoffish though quietly cold, inspiring confidence—like everyone possessing a quiet strength—a gentleman from head to foot." Dostoevsky, commenting on Speshnev's appearance in Irkutsk, wrote to his brother: "The fate of this man is amazing! No matter where or how he shows up, the most sincere and astute people immediately surround him with reverence and admiration."

Speshnev was appointed by Muravyev as the editor of the local government-published newspaper, a position he held from 1857 to 1859. In 1859 he joined the governor on an expedition to China along the Amur River.

Speshnev was allowed to return to Petersburg in December 1859 and with Muravyev's help had his title and rights as a nobleman restored the following year. In Petersburg he set about acquainting himself with the leaders of the new radical generation, such as Chernyshevsky and Dobrolyubov. The poet Pleshcheyev, a fellow former member of the Petrashevsky Circle, recommended him to Dobrolyubov, writing that Speshnev was "a man very close to my heart...He is in the highest degree an upright character with a will of iron. It can absolutely be said that, among us all—he was the most remarkable figure."

In 1861-62 Speshnev lived in the Pskov province. He worked as an arbitrator in disputes between landowners and peasants and was known for upholding the rights of peasants.

Speshnev died in Saint Petersburg in 1882.

== Activities in the Petrashevsky Circle ==
Speshnev began attending the Friday meetings of the Petrashevsky Circle in early 1848. He was resolutely in favour of promoting the socialist cause by any means possible, including terrorism, and sought to form a secret society within the circle. According to Speshnev, infiltration, propaganda and revolt should be the three methods of illegal action for a secret society. He and Petrashevsky held meetings with charismatic Siberian figure Rafael Chernosvitov to discuss the possibility of co-ordinated armed revolts. Speshnev's associate, the army lieutenant Nikolay Mombelli, initiated a series of conversations promoting the idea of organized infiltration of the bureaucracy to counter government measures. Mombelli suggested that all members should submit their biography and that traitors be executed. Petrashevsky himself, though party to the conversations, consistently urged against the adoption of violent methods. Speshnev therefore continued the formation of the society without him and succeeded in recruiting a number of talented members, including Dostoevsky. Although no real action was taken by this group, Dostoevsky had no doubt that there was a "conspiracy in intent" that included promoting dissatisfaction with the current order and establishing connections with already discontented groups such as religious dissidents and serfs.

The growth of the Petrashevsky Circle in the aftermath of the 1848 revolutions in Europe led to the formation of a number of satellite groups, most notably the Palm-Durov Circle. According to Dostoevsky, the original purpose of this group had been to publish a literary almanac, but Speshnev follower Pavel Filippov convinced them to actively produce and distribute anti-government propaganda. Two works of this kind were produced, both of which were later discovered by the police. The first, a sketch entitled "A Soldier's conversation" written by another Speshnev follower, the army officer Nikolay Grigoryev, was an exhortation of the popular uprising in France aimed at a peasant audience. The second, by Filippov, was a re-writing of the Ten Commandments that characterized various acts of revolt against oppression as being in conformity with the will of God.

In the Petrashevsky circle the Speshnev group's push for greater activism had been provoking conflict with those, led by Petrashevsky himself, who favoured a more moderate approach. However, Dostoevsky's reading of Belinsky's anti-establishment Letter to Gogol produced a response of universal approval and excitement that transcended the deepening divisions. Filippov and Mombelli made copies of the letter and began distributing them, but it was at this time that the government decided to act. Unknown to the members, a government agent had been attending the meetings and reporting back to his superiors. On the night of April 22, 1849, approximately sixty members and associates of the circle were arrested. Among the documents found in Speshnev's apartment after his arrest was a prototype 'oath of allegiance', in which the signer would pledge obedience to a central committee and a willingness to be available at any time for whatever violent means were deemed necessary for the success of the cause.

Despite months of interrogation, Speshnev's personal secret society was never discovered by the authorities. Its members had never disclosed its existence to others in the circle, and all had remained loyal to each other under interrogation. Under threat of torture Speshnev confessed to the original discussions within the Petrashevsky circle, taking all the responsibility upon himself. Awaiting what they thought to be imminent execution at Semenovsky Square, a telling exchange between Speshnev and Dostoevsky is said to have taken place. According to the testimony of one of their fellow condemned, Fedor Lvov, Dostoevsky approached Speshnev and quoted from Victor Hugo's The Last Day of a Condemned Man: "Nous serons avec le Christ" [We shall be with Christ]. Speshnev, according to Lvov, replied: "Un peu de poussière" [A bit of dust].

== Speshnev and Dostoevsky ==
Although Dostoevsky was a devout Christian and never particularly sympathetic to the socialist cause, he was nonetheless an active member of Speshnev's secret revolutionary society and had no illusions about its aims. The apparent incongruity can be partly explained by Speshnev's charismatic personality and Dostoevsky's compassion for the terrible sufferings of the Russian peasantry, but there were other factors at play as well. Their paths crossed at a time when both, for different reasons, were deeply disenchanted with Petrashevsky. Speshnev despised what he saw as Petrashevsky's passivity in matters of social change, while Dostoevsky was repelled by his scornfully dismissive attitude toward Christianity. In a letter written after Dostoevsky's death, Apollon Maykov reports that Dostoevsky visited him in January 1849 and invited him to become the eighth member of Speshnev's society, saying that Petrashevsky was "a fool, an actor and a chatterbox" from whom "nothing sensible would ever come". The aim of the society was "to set up a secret printing press" and work "to produce a revolution in Russia", and Maykov recalls an overwrought Dostoevsky "lavishing all his eloquence on the sanctity of this action, on our obligation to save the fatherland, etc." Dostoevsky's friend and doctor, Stepan Yanovsky, reports that in the months leading up to the arrests his patient became anxious, irritable and melancholy, and often complained of giddiness. Dostoevsky frankly confessed to Yanovsky that the cause of this was Speshnev: he had borrowed a large sum of money from him, "and now I am with him and his. I'll never be able to pay it back, and he wouldn't take it back: that's the kind of man he is." According to Yanovsky, Dostoevsky repeated several times: "from now on, I have a Mephistopheles of my own."

According to Dostoevsky biographer Joseph Frank, Nikolay Speshnev "unquestionably furnished Dostoevsky, twenty years later, with some of the inspiration for the character of Nikolay Stavrogin in Demons." Stavrogin, like Speshnev, is a mysterious aristocratic figure moving in revolutionary circles, and a Byronic type who holds a strange fascination for everyone with whom he is involved. Speshnev's contemporaries spoke of his charismatic personality, his constant self-possession, and his handsome appearance and extreme attractiveness to women. Bakunin said of him that he "creates quite an effect: he is particularly good at wrapping himself in the mantle of a deeply pensive and quiet impenetrability." Stavrogin's persona is depicted in similar terms in the novel, and his demeanour is described as "stern, pensive and apparently distracted." Stavrogin, unlike Speshnev, seems to regard his involvement in political conspiracy as little more than a diversion or amusement, but he is idolized and treated as the post-revolution leader by the master of the novel's secret revolutionary society Pyotr Verkhovensky, and occasionally gives advice on how to operate the society.

Frank argues that the somewhat diabolical Stavrogin is not to be identified with Speshnev the man, but is rather a kind of imagined non plus ultra of his atheistic moral-philosophical ideas, particularly those derived from Feuerbach and Max Stirner. In a letter written in 1847, Speshnev discusses Feuerbach's anthropotheism, describing it as a new religion, but with a new object - 'man' instead of 'God'. While he appears to laud Feuerbach's deification of humanity, he also denies the existence of a metaphysical authority of any kind, whether 'God' or 'man'. He sees Feuerbach's position as merely another instance of deification, and as such another appeal to an alien authority: "Is the difference between a God-man and a Man-god really so great?" he asks. Like Stirner, he argues that since such abstractions have no real authority over the individual ego, it follows that there are no objective criteria for anything at all: "Such categories as beauty and ugliness, good and evil, noble and base, always were and always will remain a matter of taste." Frank compares these words to Stavrogin's in the suppressed chapter of Demons when, in the midst of confessing to a terrible crime, he formulates the guiding idea of his life: "that I neither know nor feel good and evil and that I have not only lost any sense of it, but that there is neither good nor evil (which pleased me), and that it is just a prejudice."

Dostoevsky translator David McDuff speculates that Dostoevsky refers to Speshnev on one occasion in The Idiot. The central character, Prince Myshkin, recounts a long conversation with "a certain S—", an erudite and well-bred man, on the subject of atheism.
