= Viktor Burenin =

Russian critic and satirist

Viktor Petrovich Burenin
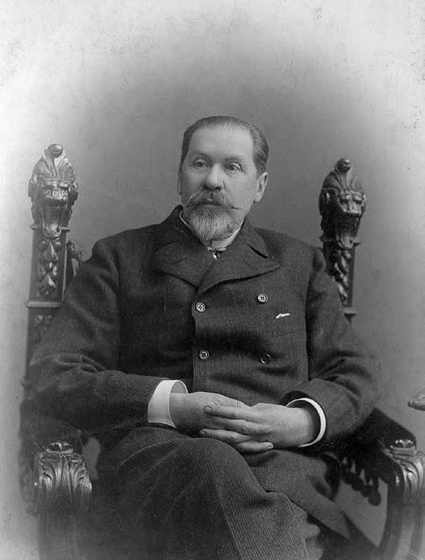
- Burenin, Saint Petersburg, 1904
- Born: March 6, 1841; Moscow, Russian Empire
- Died: August 15, 1926 (aged 85); Leningrad, USSR
- Education: Moscow College of Architecture
- Writing career
- Period: 1864–1920s
- Genres: Criticism, satire, drama

Viktor Petrovich Burenin (Russian: Ви́ктор Петро́вич Буре́нин, March 6 [O.S. February 22], 1841 – August 15, 1926) was a Russian literary and theatre critic, publicist, novelist, dramatist, translator and satirical poet notorious for his confrontational articles and satirical poems, mostly targeting leftist writers. He was the author of several popular plays (some co-authored by Alexey Suvorin), novels and opera librettos (Tchaikovsky's Mazepa; Cui's Angelo).

== Biography ==
Viktor Burenin was born in Moscow, the twelfth child in the family of architect Pyotr Petrovich Burenin. As a student of the Moscow College of Architecture (1852-1859), he became friends with some amnestied Decembrists (Ivan Pushchin, Ivan Yakushkin, Gavriil Batenkov among others) who introduced the young man to the Russian literary circles. A strong influence proved to be petrashevets Sergey Durov who advised him to translate Barbier's Iambes et poemes for the Geneva-based The Word of the Underground magazine. In 1861 Burenin spent several months in Germany, Switzerland and France; since then his visits to the Western Europe became yearly.

In the early 1860s Burenin drifted towards the Russky Vestnik-centered literary society; attended Alexey Pleshcheev's "Meetings" (it was there that he met for the first time Suvorin, Lev Tolstoy, Mikhail Saltykov-Shchedrin) and also Ivan Aksakov's "Fridays", the meeting place for the Moscow slavophiles. Burenin assisted Nikolai Nekrasov in gathering the historical data on the Decembrist revolt for the latter's poem Russian Women. At 20 he debuted with an article in Alexander Hertzen's Kolokol, in 1862 started contributing satirical poems to magazines Iskra and Zritel, writing under the pseudonym Vladimir Monumentov.

In 1863 Nekrasov, Burenin moved to Saint Petersburg and a year later became a professional author. His 1864 poem "July 13, 1864" about Chernyshevsky's trial circulated in hand-written versions and could be published only in Soviet Russia (Vestnik Literatury, 1920, No. 6). Three favorite targets for Burenin's wit in the 1860s were Prussian militarism, medical education for women and the corrupt Russian advocacy.

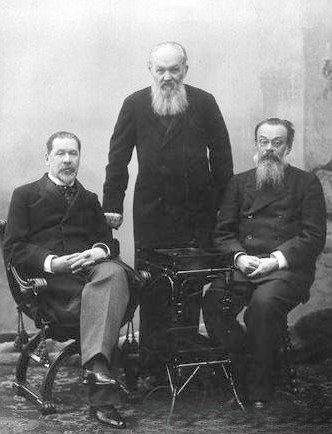
Viktor Burenin, Alexey Suvorin and N.Gey, 1901

After Dmitry Karakozov's attempt on the life of Tsar Alexander II in 1866, Burenin's flat was searched by the police and the publication of his highly popular feuilletons in Saint Petersburg's Vedomosti was stopped. Nekrasov invited him to Otechestvennye Zapiski where he started publishing poems, several of which (including an epic "Thirteen Generals") were banned by censors. The drawn-out feud with Nikolai Mikhaylovsky led to his departure from Otechestvennye Zapiski in 1872.

In 1876 Burenin joined Novoye Vremya, led by Alexey Suvorin (with it he stayed up until the newspaper's closure in 1918) and made a political U-turn. In the years to come Ivan Goncharov and Nikolai Leskov referred to him as an "unscrupulous cynic". Writers including Maxim Gorky, Anton Chekhov, Alexander Blok, Vladimir Korolenko, Leonid Andreev and Ivan Bunin filed lawsuits against him and complained about the critic's harsh words about opponents. Still, his satires were immensely popular: Blok admitted to having known by heart Burenin's parodies of his poems and was often entertaining his friends reciting them.

Personal tragedy, the death in 1884 of 20-year-old son Konstantin (a gifted poet and translator, known as K.Renin), made Burenin totally alienated from the outside world. The office of Novoye Vremya (which he lived nearby) for years became his real home. Highly detrimental to his reputation was the quarrel with dying Semyon Nadson. Having construed the latter's criticism towards himself as an 'ingratitude' (Burenin assisted Nadson's debut publication; the latter felt uneasy with the fact) he published fragments from Nadson's personal correspondence, then accused the poet of simulating his illness in order to receive financial support from friends. According to popular myth the shock Nadson received was fatal and in several days' time he died. "Since then Burenin's been treated [by the literary elite] so much more cruelly than he'd treated Nadson and [the latter's] fan Eleonora Obmokni," according to the theatre critic Alexander Kugel. So insistent was the liberal and left press in their obstruction that Burenin's name became a token one: Vladimir Lenin mentioned it regularly as a symbol of 'dirty' methods in leading the polemics.

Burenin's "Critical Sketches" in Novoye Vremya were immensely successful: general readership loved his irreverent manner of ridiculing both authors and their works. Paradoxically, the Sketches did a lot to inform the readership about the new literary events. "Violating every norm of manner and behavior in his attacks on Merezhkovsky, Volynsky, Gippius... Burenin has done more than anybody else to popularize the new trends he slagged each Fridays in his brilliant buffoonery," argued critic Pyotr Pertsov. "While in the liberal circles to read Novoye Vremya was considered mauves ton, Berenin's feullietons were read by everybody, clandestinely," wrote author and publisher Boris Glinsky.

Burenin's novels and novellas had considerable commercial success (mainly due to their sensationalist nature: the characters were easily recognizable real people) but, according to biographer Lepyokhin, hold little artistic merit. More substantial were Burenin's plays, based on antique and Middle Ages plots (Medea, with Suvorin as co-author, 1883; Messalina, 1885; The Death of Agrippina, 1887; The Comedy of Princess Zabava Putyatishna and Boyar-lady Vasilisa Mikulishna, 1889), all staged by Maly and Alexandrinsky theatres. Burenin translated several plays, by William Shakespeare, Niccolò Machiavelli, Alexandre Dumas, Karl Gutzkow, Gerhart Hauptmann, among others. For many years Burenin was taking an active part in the life of Maly Theatre before founding (again with Suvorin) The Literary and Arts' Society Theatre.

After the 1917 Revolution Burenin stayed in Soviet Russia and fared relatively well despite the false obituary published in 1921 by Belgrade-based Novoye Vremya, re-newed by Suvorin's son. He was helped a lot by Maxim Gorky whom he mercifully lampooned in the 1900s.

== Legacy ==
Viktor Burenin was one of the most controversial Russian authors of the early 20th century. The nature of his reputation was well described by Dmitry Minayev's epigram: "A dog runs down the street / Followed by Burenin, looking quite and nice / Watch out, the policemen, though / So as he won't bite the dog!" According to the 1911 edition of the Brockhaus and Efron Encyclopedic Dictionary, "Burenin’s literary character is defined... by the peculiar methods this critic used for his invectives, the methods that cannot be characterized in academic terms."

Many of Burenin's parodies found their way into Soviet satirical poetry anthologies. Criticising Burenin’s methods ("what he does is looking for every possibility way to offend his opponent, by ascribing to him some kind of smut"), Leskov still credited him for "great erudition, wit and cleverness". "Objectively speaking, he was one of the most gifted authors of the literary right wing," wrote Korney Chukovsky.

According to biographer M.P.Lepyokhin, though, Burenin was not a right wing sympathizer, and his satires often clashed with Suvorin-dictated general line of the newspaper. Never motivated by corporative or ideological interests, he was relying totally on his own ideas and concepts, one of which was that all Russian writers (and the new generation of them, in particular) were charlatans tending to fool their readership with nonsense which had nothing to do with reality. Burenin "despised [Russian] literature and lampooned it," Alexey Suvorin maintained.

Suvorin considered Burenin to be a victim of censorship which prevented him realizing his true potential. "Had we any freedom of the press, he'd have become the unique pamphleteer, using his wit to expose corrupt ministers, people like that. What he does now instead, is squander his gift on petty quarrels," he wrote. "A critic of considerable gift, an incomparable pamphleteer and totally worthless dramatist,” was Suvorin's more general verdict on his ally and friend. Yet, author and critic Nikolai Snessarev thought Suvorin (who reviewed his plays regularly and always negatively) might have been jealous of Burenin, a highly popular playwright.

As a literary critic Burenin was credited with originality and wit by Lev Tolstoy, Nikolai Nekrasov and Nikolai Leskov. Fyodor Dostoyevsky even argued that Burenin "understood him better than any other man" who wrote about him. According to biographer M.Lepyokhin, Burenin has launched "a genre reform" which changed radically the face and the nature of Russian feuilleton. "With his arrival for the first time [in Russia] a highly detailed, sharp satire aimed at concrete targets superseded some abstract moralization," argued the critic.

== Select bibliography ==
=== Novels ===
- The Dead Leg (Мертвая нога, 1889)
- The Romance in Kislovodsk (Роман в Кисловодске, 1889)
- From the Notes of a Suicide (Из записок самоубийцы, 1875)
- A Strange Case (Странный случай, 1878)

=== Plays ===
- Medea (Медея, 1884, with Alexey Suvorin)
- Messalina (Мессалина, 1885)
- The Death of Agrippina (Смерть Агриппины, 1886)
- The Comedy of Zabava Putyatishna and Boyarynya Vasilisa Mikulishna (Комедия о княжне Забаве Путятишне и боярыне Василисе Микулишне», 1890)
- The Byzantine Captive (Пленник Византии, drama, 1893)
- Diana Fornari (Диана Форнари, drama, 1894)
- All Is Well That’s Ended Well (Все хорошо, что хорошо кончилось, comedy, 1893)
- Aphrodita’s Necklace (Ожерелье Афродиты, drama, 1896)
- The Sunken Bell (Потонувший колокол, the translation of Gerhart Hauptmann’s Die versunkene Glocke, 1897)
- Princess Ozra's Heart (Сердце принцессы Озры, 1898)

=== Librettos ===
- Angelo by Cesar Cui (1875)
- Mazepa by Pyotr Ilyich Tchaikovsky (1883 )
- Matron of Ephesus (Матрона Эфесская), operetta by Mikhail Ivanov
- Zabava Putyatishna (Забава Путятишна), opera by Mikhail Ivanov, 1897

=== Compilations ===
- Sketches and Parodies (Очерки и пародии, 1874; 1895)
- From the Past (Былое, poems, 1880)
- Arrows (Стрелы, poems, 1880; 1889)
- Songs and Caricatures (Песни и шаржи, 1886)
- From the Modern Life (Из современной жизни, 1879)
- Critical Sketches and Pamphlets (Критические очерки и памфлеты, 1884)
- Critical Etudes (Критические этюды, 1888)
- The Tail (Хвост, a collection of parodies, 1891; 1893)
- Pipa and Pusya. Humorous stories (Пипа и Пуся. Юмористические рассказы. 1894)
- Blue Sounds and White Poems (Голубые звуки и белые поэмы, parodies, 1895)
- Woe by Stupidity (Горе от глупости, 1905)
- The Works of V.P.Burenin (Saint Petersburg, 1912—1917). Vols. I-V (unfinished)
