= Alexander Palm =

Russian dramatist, novelist, poet

Alexander Ivanovich Palm
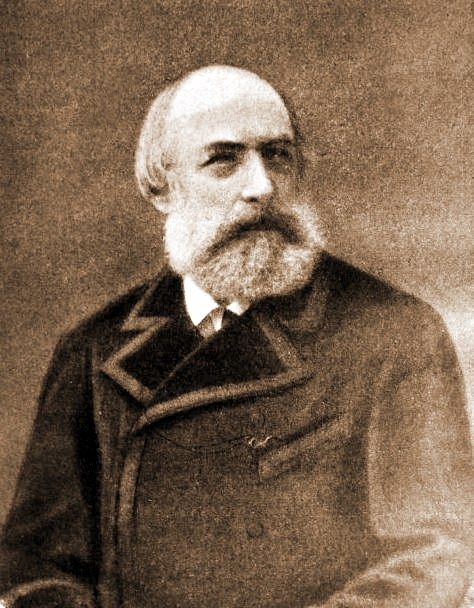
- Born: Александр Иванович Пальм; 2 February 1822; Krasnoslobodsk, Penza Governorate, Russian Empire
- Died: 22 November 1885 (aged 63); Saint Petersburg, Russian Empire
- Other name: P. Alminsky
- Occupations: Novelist, poet, dramatist

Alexander Ivanovich Palm (Александр Иванович Пальм, 2 February [O.S. 21 January] 1822 – 22 November [O.S. 10 November] 1885) was a Russian poet, novelist and playwright, who also used the pseudonym P. Alminsky. A member of the Petrashevsky Circle, Palm in 1847 was arrested, spent 8 months in the Petropavlovsk Fortress, had his death sentence changed to deportation and served 7 years in the Russian Army. Among his best known works are Alexey Slobodin. The History of One Family (1874, novel) and Our Friend Neklyuzhev (1879, drama).

== Biography ==
Alexander Ivanovich Palm was born in Krasnoslobodsk, Penza region, son of a provincial state official and a serf peasant woman. As a teenager he enrolled into the Saint Petersburg military school and after graduation in 1842 joined the Russian Guards as a junior officer. In 1843 his debut poem published by Literaturnaya Gazeta received praise from critic and playwright Fyodor Koni. In the course of the next five years more than 30 poems by Palm appeared in different Russian magazines.

In 1847 Palm began attending Mikhail Petrashevsky's 'Fridays', and later joined his best friend Sergey Durov's circle. According to his biographer S.L.Kravets, revolutionary ideas had never attracted Palm, and his participation in the underground movement was motivated more by friendship than conviction. During interrogations he expressed deep repentance over his own actions, but refused to give information about his friends. According to an inscription made by a secret police official on Palm's personal file, dated 29 April 1849: "His confession is well-written, but... he never reveals, rather tries to conceal Petrashevsky's criminal intentions."

Palm spent eight months in the Petropavlovsk Fortress, before being told, along with the other members of the Petrashevsky circle, that he was to be executed by a firing squad. They were taken to Semonovsky Square and lined up for execution, but at the last moment a messenger arrived from the Tsar sparing their lives. Palm was pardoned and sent into the Russian army as a junior officer. After 7 years of service (in the Caucasus and the Crimea, where he took part in the Crimean War), Palm retired as an army major. In 1871, now a manager of a financial control office in Poltava, Palm embezzled 17 thousand rubles that he had taken from public funds and was sentenced to 3 years of exile. Włodzimierz Spasowicz, a renowned lawyer who defended Palm, never disputed the fact of the embezzlement, but stressed the dire financial circumstances in which the once well-known writer had found himself.

After three years spent in Samara Governorate, Palm returned to literary activities and published numerous novels and dramas. During the Russo-Turkish War (1877–78) he worked as a war correspondent for Novoye Vremya, in 1883 edited the weekly newspaper Teatr, for a year was the head of the Pushkin literary circle, having succeeded Alexey Pleshcheyev.

== Legacy ==
Alexander Palm's poetry, "marked by clarity of vision, sonority and technical precision," bore all the marks of Mikhail Lermontov's influence, according to biographer Kravets. Palm's best known poetic drama, The Tale of Tsar, Tsarina and Guslyar with a Cat from the Overseas (1843) was similar to Lermontov's The Song of the Merchant Kalashnikov. Palm's 1849 novel Zhak Bichovkin featured a hero who, according to the author himself, "regarded himself as another Pechorin."

The centerpiece of Palm's vast prosaic legacy is the novel Alexey Slobodin. The Family History in 5 Parts which he published in Vestnik Evropy (1872, Nos. 10,12; 1873, Nos. 2, 3; 1874, Nos. 10, 11) under the moniker P.Alminsky. The novel attracted much interest because most of its heroes had real life prototypes, members of the Petrashevsky and Durov's circles (Rudkovsky as Durov, Slobodin as Fyodor Dostoyevsky).

Palm's dramas Old Landlord (1873) and Our Friend Neklyuzhev (1879), staged by the Aleksandrinsky and Maly Theaters respectively, proved to be very popular with the public. Contemporary critics dismissed them, but in retrospect Russian literary historians see Palm's plays as superior to his prose and poetry.

== Select bibliography ==
=== Novels ===
- Zhak Bichovkin (Жак Бичовкин, 1849)
- Alexey Slobodin (Алексей Слободин, 1872- 1874)
- The End of the Old Romance (Конец старого романа, 1874)
- The Lost Years (Пропащие годы, 1880)
- The Petersburg Locust (Петербургская саранча, 1884)

=== Dramas ===
- Old Landlord (Старый барин, 1873)
- Our Friend Neklyuzhev (Наш друг Неклюжев, 1879)

=== Poetry ===
- The Tale of Tsar, Tsarina and Guslyar With a Cat from the Overseas (1843, drama in verse)
