= Demons (Dostoevsky novel) =

1872 novel by Fyodor Dostoevsky

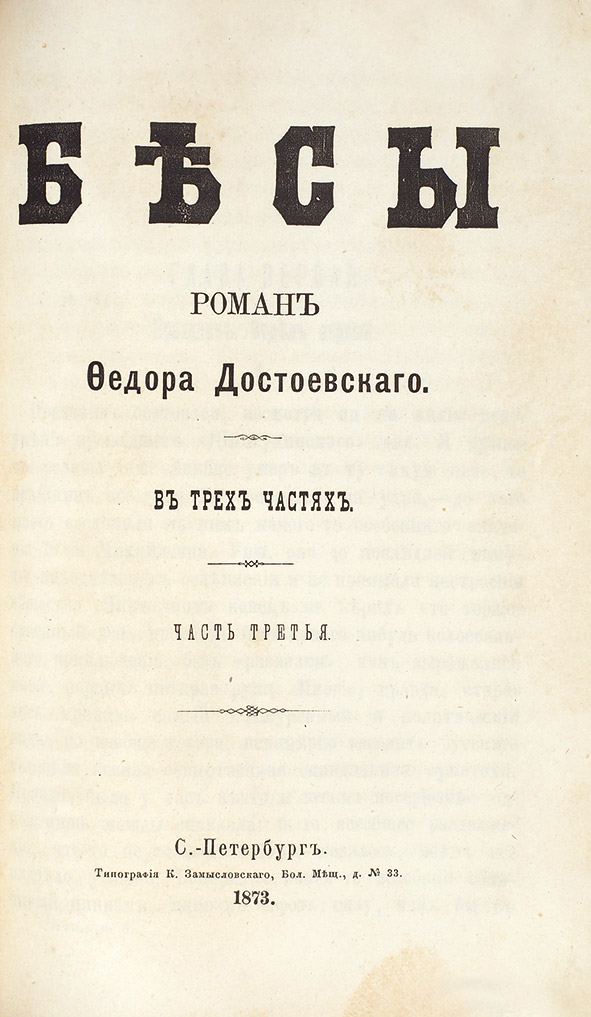
- The front page of Demons, first edition, 1873 (Russian)
- Author: Fyodor Dostoevsky
- Original title: Бѣсы
- Translator: Constance Garnett (1916); David Magarshack (1954); Andrew R Macandrew (1962); Michael R. Katz (1992); Richard Pevear and Larissa Volokhonsky (1995); Robert A. Maguire (2008); Roger Cockrell (2018)
- Language: Russian
- Genre: Philosophical novel Political novel Anti-nihilistic novel Psychological novel Satirical novel
- Publication date: 1871–72
- Publication place: Russia
- English publication date: 1916
- Preceded by: The Idiot

Demons (Russian: Бесы, romanized: Besy, (Note: Pre-reform spelling: Бѣсы) IPA: [ˈbʲe.sɨ]; sometimes also called The Possessed or The Devils) is a novel by Fyodor Dostoevsky, first published in the journal The Russian Messenger in 1871–72. It is considered one of the four masterworks written by Dostoevsky after his return from Siberian exile, along with Crime and Punishment (1866), The Idiot (1869), and The Brothers Karamazov (1880).

Demons is a social and political satire, a psychological drama, and a large-scale tragedy. Joyce Carol Oates has described it as "Dostoevsky's most confused and violent novel, and his most satisfactorily 'tragic' work." According to Ronald Hingley, it is Dostoevsky's "greatest onslaught on Nihilism", and "one of humanity's most impressive achievements—perhaps even its supreme achievement—in the art of prose fiction."

Demons is an allegory of the potentially catastrophic consequences of the political and moral nihilism that were becoming prevalent in Russia in the 1860s. A fictional town descends into chaos as it becomes the focal point of an attempted revolution, orchestrated by master conspirator Pyotr Verkhovensky. The mysterious aristocratic figure of Nikolai Stavrogin—Verkhovensky's counterpart in the moral sphere—dominates the book, exercising an extraordinary influence over the hearts and minds of almost all the other characters.

The idealistic, Western-influenced intellectuals of the 1840s epitomized in the character of Stepan Verkhovensky, who is both Pyotr Verkhovensky's father and Nikolai Stavrogin's childhood teacher, are presented as the unconscious progenitors and helpless accomplices of the "demonic" forces that take possession of the town.

== Title ==
The original Russian title is Bésy (Russian: Бесы, singular Бес, bés), which means "demons". There are three English translations of the title: The Possessed, The Devils, and Demons. Constance Garnett's 1916 translation popularized the novel under the title The Possessed, but this title has been rejected by later translators. They argue that "The Possessed" points in the wrong direction because Bésy refers to active subjects rather than passive objects—"possessors" rather than "the possessed."

'Demons' in this sense refer not so much to individuals as to the ideas that possess them. For Dostoevsky, 'ideas' are living cultural forces that have the capacity to seduce and subordinate the individual consciousness, and the individual who has become alienated from his own concrete national traditions is particularly susceptible. According to translator Richard Pevear, the demons are "that legion of isms that came to Russia from the West: idealism, rationalism, empiricism, materialism, utilitarianism, positivism, socialism, anarchism, nihilism, and, underlying them all, atheism." The counter-ideal (expressed in the novel through the character of Ivan Shatov) is that of an authentically Russian culture growing out of the people's inherent spirituality and faith, but even this—as mere idealization and an attempt to reassert something that has been lost—is another idea and lacks real force.

In a letter to his friend Apollon Maykov, Dostoevsky alludes to the episode of the exorcism of the Gerasene demoniac in the Gospel of Luke as the inspiration for the title: "Exactly the same thing happened in our country: the devils went out of the Russian man and entered into a herd of swine... These are drowned or will be drowned, and the healed man, from whom the devils have departed, sits at the feet of Jesus." Part of the passage is used as an epigraph, and Dostoevsky's thoughts on its relevance to Russia are given voice by Stepan Verkhovensky on his deathbed near the end of the novel.

== Background ==
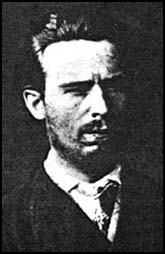
Sergey Nechayev

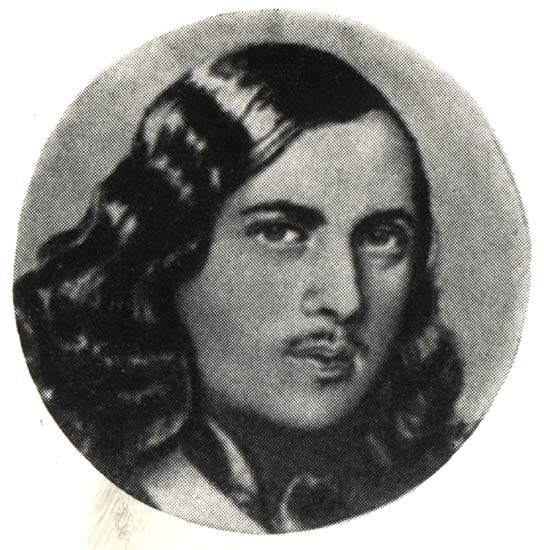
Nikolay Speshnev

In late 1860s Russia there was an unusual level of political unrest caused by student groups influenced by liberal, socialist, and revolutionary ideas. In 1869, Dostoevsky conceived the idea of a 'pamphlet novel' directed against the radicals. He focused on the group organized by young agitator Sergey Nechayev, particularly their murder of a former comrade—Ivan Ivanov—at the Petrovskaya Agricultural Academy in Moscow. Dostoevsky had first heard of Ivanov from his brother-in-law, who was a student at the academy, and had been much interested in his rejection of radicalism and exhortation of the Russian Orthodox Church and the House of Romanov as the true custodians of Russia's destiny. He was horrified to hear of Ivanov's murder by the Nechayevists, and vowed to write a political novel about what he called "the most important problem of our time."

Prior to this, Dostoevsky had been working on a philosophical novel (entitled 'The Life of a Great Sinner') examining the psychological and moral implications of atheism. The political polemic and parts of the philosophical novel were merged into a single larger scale project, which became Demons. As work progressed, the liberal and nihilistic characters began to take on a secondary role as Dostoevsky focused more on the amoralism of a charismatic aristocratic figure—Nikolai Stavrogin.

Although a merciless satirical attack on various forms of radical thought and action, Demons does not bear much resemblance to the typical anti-nihilist novels of the era (as found in the work of Nikolai Leskov, for example), which tended to present the nihilists as deceitful and utterly selfish villains in an essentially black and white moral world. Dostoevsky's nihilists are portrayed in their ordinary human weakness, drawn into the world of destructive ideas through vanity, naïveté, idealism, and the susceptibility of youth. In re-imagining Nechayev's orchestration of the murder, Dostoevsky was attempting to "depict those diverse and multifarious motives by which even the purest of hearts and the most innocent of people can be drawn in to committing such a monstrous offence."

In A Writer's Diary, he discusses the relationship of the ideas of his own generation to those of the current generation, and suggests that in his youth he too could have become a follower of someone like Nechayev. As a young man Dostoevsky himself was a member of a radical organisation (the Petrashevsky Circle), for which he was arrested and exiled to a Siberian prison camp. Dostoevsky was an active participant in a secret revolutionary society formed from among the members of the Petrashevsky Circle. The cell's founder and leader, the aristocrat Nikolay Speshnev, is thought by many commentators to be the principal inspiration for the character of Stavrogin.

== Narration ==
The first person narrator is a minor character, Anton Lavrentyevich G—v, who is a close friend and confidant of Stepan Verkhovensky. Young, educated, upright, and sensible, Anton Lavrentyevich is a local civil servant who has decided to write a chronicle of the strange events that have recently occurred in his town. Despite being a secondary character, he has a surprisingly intimate knowledge of all the characters and events, such that the narrative often seems to metamorphose into that of the omniscient third person. According to Joseph Frank, this unusual narrative point-of-view enables Dostoevsky "to portray his main figures against a background of rumor, opinion and scandal-mongering that serves somewhat the function of a Greek chorus in relation to the central action."

The narrator's voice is intelligent, frequently ironic, and psychologically perceptive, but it is only periodically the dominant voice, and often seems to disappear altogether. Much of the narrative unfolds dialogically, implied and explicated through the interactions of the characters, the internal dialogue of a single character, or through a combination of the two, rather than through the narrator's story-telling or description. In Problems of Dostoevsky's Poetics, the Russian philosopher and literary theorist Mikhail Bakhtin describes Dostoevsky's literary style as polyphonic, with the cast of individual characters being a multiplicity of "voice-ideas", restlessly asserting and defining themselves in relation to each other. The narrator in this sense is present merely as an agent for recording the synchronisation of multiple autonomous narratives, with his own voice weaving in and out of the contrapuntal texture.

== Characters ==
=== Major characters ===
- Stepan Trofimovich Verkhovensky is a refined and high-minded intellectual who unintentionally contributes to the development of nihilistic forces, centering on his son Pyotr Stepanovich and former pupil Nikolai Stavrogin, that ultimately bring local society to the brink of collapse. The character is Dostoevsky's rendering of an archetypal liberal idealist of the 1840s Russian intelligentsia, and is based partly on Pyotr Chaadayev, Timofey Granovsky, Vissarion Belinsky and Alexander Herzen.

The novel begins with the narrator's affectionate but ironic description of Stepan Trofimovich's character and early career. He had the beginnings of a career as a lecturer at the University, and for a short time was a prominent figure among the exponents of the 'new ideas' that were beginning to influence Russian cultural life. He claims that government officials viewed him as a dangerous thinker, forcing him out of academia and into exile in the provinces, but in reality, it was more likely that no one of note in the government even knew who he was. In any case, his anxiety prompted him to accept Varvara Stavrogina's proposal that he take upon himself "the education and the entire intellectual development of her only son in the capacity of a superior pedagogue and friend, not to mention a generous remuneration."
A chaste, idealistic but fraught relationship between Stepan Trofimovich and Varvara Stavrogina continues long after the tuition has ceased. In a cynical but not entirely inaccurate critique of his father, Pyotr Stepanovich describes their mutual dependence thus: "she provided the capital, and you were her sentimental buffoon." Though very conscious of his own erudition, higher ideals and superior aesthetic sensibilities, Stepan Trofimovich doesn't actually seem to do anything at all in the scholarly sense. He is utterly dependent on Varvara Petrovna financially and she frequently rescues him from the consequences of his irresponsibility. When he perceives that he has been unjust or irresponsible in relation to her, he is overcome with shame to the point of physical illness.

- Varvara Petrovna Stavrogina is a wealthy and influential landowner, residing on the magnificent estate of Skvoreshniki where much of the action of the novel takes place.

She supports Stepan Trofimovich financially and emotionally, protects him, fusses over him, and in the process acquires for herself an idealized romantic poet, modelled somewhat on the writer Nestor Kukolnik. She promotes his reputation as the town's preeminent intellectual, a reputation he happily indulges at regular meetings, often enhanced with champagne, of the local 'free-thinkers'.
Generous, noble-minded, and strong willed, Varvara Petrovna prides herself on her patronage of artistic and charitable causes. She is "a classic kind of woman, a female Maecenas, who acted strictly out of the highest considerations". But she is also extremely demanding and unforgiving, and is almost terrifying to Stepan Trofimovich when he inadvertently fails her or humiliates her in some way. Pyotr Stepanovich, on his arrival in the town, is quick to take advantage of her resentment towards his father.
Varvara Petrovna almost worships her son, Nikolai Vsevolodovich, but there are indications that she is aware that there is something deeply wrong. She tries to ignore this however, and Pyotr Stepanovich is able to further ingratiate himself by subtly presenting her son's inexplicable behaviour in a favourable light.

- Nikolai Vsevolodovich Stavrogin is the central character of the novel. He is handsome, strong, fearless, intelligent, and refined, but at the same time, according to the narrator, there is something repellent about him. Socially he is self-assured and courteous, but his general demeanour is described as "stern, pensive and apparently distracted." Other characters are fascinated by Stavrogin, especially the younger Verkhovensky, who envisions him as the figurehead of the revolution he is attempting to spark. Shatov, on the other hand, once looked up to him as a potentially great leader who could inspire Russia to a Christian regeneration. Disillusioned, he now sees him as "an idle, footloose son of a landowner", a man who has lost the distinction between good and evil. According to Shatov, Stavrogin is driven by "a passion for inflicting torment", not merely for the pleasure of harming others, but to torment his own conscience and wallow in the sensation of "moral carnality". In an originally censored chapter (included as "At Tikhon's" in modern editions), Stavrogin himself defines the rule of his life thus: "that I neither know nor feel good and evil and that I have not only lost any sense of it, but that there is neither good nor evil... and that it is just a prejudice". In a written confession given to the monk Tikhon, he tells of a number of crimes, including raping and driving to suicide a girl of about 11 years. He describes in detail the profound inner pleasure he experiences when he becomes conscious of himself in shameful situations, particularly in moments of committing a crime.

When in Petersburg, Stavrogin had secretly married the mentally and physically disabled Marya Lebyadkina. He shows signs of caring for her, but ultimately becomes complicit in her murder. The extent to which he himself is responsible for the murder is unclear, but he is aware that it is being plotted and does nothing to prevent it. In a letter to Darya Pavlovna near the end of the novel, he affirms that he is guilty in his own conscience for the death of his wife.

- Pyotr Stepanovich Verkhovensky is the son of Stepan Trofimovich and the principal driving force of the mayhem that ultimately engulfs the town. The father and son are a representation of the aetiological connection Dostoevsky perceived between the liberal idealists of the 1840s and the nihilistic revolutionaries of the 1860s. The character of Pyotr Stepanovich was inspired by the revolutionary Sergey Nechayev, in particular the methods described in his manifesto Catechism of a Revolutionary. In the Catechism revolutionaries are encouraged to "aid the growth of calamity and every evil, which must at last exhaust the patience of the people and force them into a general uprising." Verkhovensky's murder of Shatov in the novel was based on the Nechayevites' murder of Ivanov.

Pyotr Stepanovich claims to be connected to the central committee of a vast, organized conspiracy to overthrow the government and establish socialism. He manages to convince his small group of co-conspirators that they are just one revolutionary cell among many, and that their part in the scheme will help set off a nationwide revolt. Pyotr Stepanovich is enamored of Stavrogin, and he tries desperately, through a combination of ensnarement and persuasion, to recruit him to the cause. The revolution he envisages will ultimately require a despotic leader, and he thinks that Stavrogin's strong will, personal charisma, and "unusual aptitude for crime" are the necessary qualities for such a leader.
Pyotr Verkhovensky, according to Stavrogin, is "an enthusiast". At every opportunity he uses his prodigious verbal abilities to sow discord and manipulate people for his own political ends. His greatest success is with the Governor's wife, and he manages to gain an extraordinary influence over her and her social circle. This influence, in conjunction with constant undermining of authority figures like his father and the Governor, is ruthlessly exploited to bring about a breakdown of standards in society.

- Ivan Pavlovich Shatov is the son of Varvara Stavrogina's deceased valet. When he was a child she took him and his sister Darya Pavlovna under her protection, and they received tutoring from Stepan Trofimovich. At university Shatov had socialist convictions and was expelled following an incident. He travelled abroad as a tutor with a merchant's family, but the employment came to an end when he married the family's governess who had been dismissed for 'freethinking'. Having no money and not recognizing the ties of marriage, they parted almost immediately. He wandered Europe alone before eventually returning to Russia.

By the time of the events in the novel, Shatov has completely rejected his former convictions and become a passionate defender of Russia's Christian heritage. Shatov's reformed ideas resemble those of the contemporary philosophy Pochvennichestvo (roughly: "return to the soil"), with which Dostoevsky was sympathetic. Like the broader Slavophile movement, Pochvennichestvo asserted the paramount importance of Slavic traditions in Russia, as opposed to cultural influences originating in Western Europe, and particularly emphasized the unique mission of the Russian Orthodox Church. Shatov goes further by describing that mission as universal rather than merely Russian. Generally awkward, gloomy, and taciturn, Shatov becomes emotional and loquacious when aroused by an affront to his convictions. In the chapter 'Night' he engages in a heated discussion with Stavrogin about God, Russia, and morality. As a younger man Shatov had idolized Stavrogin, but having seen through him and guessed the secret of his marriage, he seeks to tear down the idol in a withering critique. Stavrogin, though affected, is certainly not withered, and answers by drawing attention to the inadequacy of Shatov's own faith, something Shatov himself recognizes.
Shatov's relationship with Pyotr Verkhovensky is one of mutual hatred. Verkhovensky conceives the idea of having the group murder him as a traitor to the cause, thereby binding them closer together by the blood they have shed.

- Alexei Nilych Kirillov is an engineer who lives in the same house as Shatov. He also has a connection to Verkhovensky's revolutionary society, but of a very unusual kind: he is determined to kill himself and has agreed to do it at a time when it can be of use to the society's aims.

Like Shatov, Kirillov has been deeply influenced by Stavrogin, but in a diametrically opposed way. While inspiring Shatov with the ecstatic image of the Russian Christ, Stavrogin was simultaneously encouraging Kirillov toward the logical extremes of atheism—the absolute supremacy of the human will. "If God does not exist", according to Kirillov, "then all will is mine, and I am obliged to proclaim self-will." This proclamation must take the form of the act of killing himself, with the sole motive being annihilation of mankind's fear of death, a fear implicit in their belief in God. He believes that this purposeful act, by demonstrating the transcendence of this fear, will initiate the new era of the Man-God, when there is no God other than the human will.
Despite the apparent grandiosity of the idea, Kirillov is a reclusive, deeply humble, almost selfless person who has become obsessed with making himself a sacrifice for the greater good of humanity. Pyotr Stepanovich tells him: "You haven't consumed the idea but you... have been consumed by the idea, and so you won't be able to relinquish it." The motives are of no interest to Pyotr Stepanovich, but he recognizes the sincerity of Kirillov's intention and incorporates it into his plans as a means of deflecting attention from the conspiracy.

=== Other characters ===
- Lizaveta Nikolaevna Tushina (Liza) is a lively, beautiful, intelligent and wealthy young woman. She is the daughter of Varvara Petrovna's friend Praskovya, and is another former pupil of Stepan Trofimovich. She has become ambiguously involved with Stavrogin after their encounter in Switzerland and seems to oscillate between deep love and profound hatred for him. She is resentful and suspicious of Dasha's strange intimacy with him, and is extremely anxious to understand the nature of his connection to Marya Lebyadkina during the time when the marriage is still a secret. Liza becomes engaged to her cousin Mavriky Nikolaevich, but remains fixated on Stavrogin even after he openly acknowledges his marriage.
- Darya Pavlovna (Dasha) is Shatov's sister, the protégé of Varvara Petrovna, and for a short time the fiancée of Stepan Trofimovich. She is the reluctant confidant and "nurse" of Stavrogin.
- Marya Timofeevna Lebyadkina is married to Nikolai Stavrogin. Though childlike, mentally unstable, and confused, she frequently demonstrates a deeper insight into what is going on, and has many of the attributes of a 'holy fool'. According to Frank, Marya represents "Dostoevsky's vision of the primitive religious sensibility of the Russian people", and the false marriage, her rejection of Stavrogin, and her eventual murder, point to the impossibility of a true union between the Christian Russian people and godless Russian Europeanism.
- Captain Lebyadkin is Marya's brother. He receives payments for her care from Stavrogin, but he mistreats her and squanders the money on himself. He is loud, indiscreet, and almost always drunk. He considers himself a poet and frequently quotes his own verses. Although in awe of Stavrogin, he is a constant threat to maintaining the secrecy of the marriage. He is unwillingly involved in Pyotr Stepanovich's plans, and his inept attempts to extract himself via approaches to the authorities are another cause of his eventual murder.
- Fed'ka the Convict is an escaped convict who is suspected of several thefts and murders in the town. He was originally a serf belonging to Stepan Trofimovich, but was sold into the army to help pay his master's gambling debts. It is Fed'ka who murders Stavrogin's wife and her brother, at the instigation of Pyotr Stepanovich. Stavrogin himself initially opposes the murder, but his later actions suggest a kind of passive consent.
- Andrey Antonovich von Lembke is the Governor of the province and one of the principal targets of Pyotr Stepanovich in his quest for societal breakdown. Although a good and conscientious man he is completely incapable of responding effectively to Pyotr Stepanovich's machinations. Estranged from his wife, who has unwittingly become a pawn in the conspirators' game, he descends into a mental breakdown as events get increasingly out of control.
- Julia Mikhaylovna von Lembke is the Governor's wife. Her vanity and liberal ambition are exploited by Pyotr Stepanovich for his revolutionary aims. The conspirators succeed in transforming her Literary Fête for the benefit of poor governesses into a scandalous farce. Dostoevsky's depiction of the relationship between Pyotr Stepanovich and Julia Mikhaylovna had its origins in a passage from Nechayev's Catechism where revolutionaries are instructed to consort with liberals "on the basis of their own program, pretending to follow them blindly" but with the purpose of compromising them so that they can be "used to provoke disturbances."
- Semyon Yegorovich Karmazinov is Dostoevsky's literary caricature of his contemporary Ivan Turgenev, author of the proto-nihilist novel Fathers and Sons (1862). Of the same generation as Stepan Trofimovich, Karmazinov is a vain and pretentious literary has-been who shamelessly seeks to ingratiate himself with Pyotr Stepanovich and does much to promote the nihilists' legitimacy among the liberal establishment.
- Shigalyev is a historian and social theorist, the intellectual of Verkhovensky's revolutionary group, who has devised a system for the post-revolution organization of mankind. "My conclusion" he says, "stands in direct contradiction to the idea from which I started. Proceeding from unlimited freedom, I end with unlimited despotism." Ninety percent of society is to be enslaved to the remaining ten percent. Equality of the herd is to be enforced by police state tactics, state terrorism, and destruction of intellectual, artistic, and cultural life. It is estimated that about a hundred million people will need to be killed on the way to the goal.
- Bishop Tikhon is a monk and spiritual adviser recommended to Stavrogin by Shatov. He only appears in the censored chapter, but he has importance as the person to whom Stavrogin makes his most detailed and candid confession. He is perhaps the only character to truly understand Stavrogin's spiritual and psychological state. He describes the confession as coming from "the need of a heart that has been mortally wounded" and advises Stavrogin to submit his life to an Elder. Dostoevsky's model for the character of Bishop Tikhon was the 18th century monk and writer Tikhon of Zadonsk.

== Plot summary ==
The novel is in three parts. There are two epigraphs, the first from Pushkin's poem "Demons" and the second from Luke 8:32–36.

=== Part I ===
After a curtailed academic career, Stepan Trofimovich Verkhovensky is residing with the wealthy landowner Varvara Petrovna Stavrogina at her estate, Skvoreshniki, in a provincial Russian town. Originally employed as a tutor to Stavrogina's son, Nikolai Vsevolodovich, Stepan Trofimovich has been there for almost twenty years in an intimate but platonic relationship with his noble patroness. Stepan Trofimovich also has a son from a previous marriage but he has grown up elsewhere without his father's involvement.

A troubled Varvara Petrovna has just returned from Switzerland where she has been visiting Nikolai Vsevolodovich. She berates Stepan Trofimovich for his financial irresponsibility, but her main preoccupation is an "intrigue" she encountered in Switzerland concerning her son and his relations with Liza Tushina—the beautiful daughter of her friend Praskovya. Praskovya and Liza arrive at the town, without Nikolai Vsevolodovich, who has gone to Petersburg. According to Praskovya, Varvara Petrovna's young protégée Darya Pavlovna (Dasha), has also somehow become involved with Nikolai Vsevolodovich, but the details are ambiguous.

Varvara Petrovna suddenly conceives the idea of forming an engagement between Stepan Trofimovich and Dasha. Though dismayed, Stepan Trofimovich accedes to her proposal, which happens to resolve a delicate financial issue for him. Influenced by gossip, he begins to suspect that he is being married off to cover up "another man's sins" and writes "noble" letters to his fiancée and Nikolai Vsevolodovich. Matters are further complicated by the arrival of a mysterious "crippled woman", Marya Lebyadkina, to whom Nikolai Vsevolodovich is also rumoured to be connected, although no one seems to know exactly how. A hint is given when Varvara Petrovna asks the mentally disturbed Marya, who has approached her outside church, if she is Lebyadkina and she replies that she is not.

Varvara Petrovna takes Marya (and Liza, who has insisted on coming with them) back to Skvoreshniki. Already present are Dasha, her older brother Ivan Shatov, and a nervous Stepan Trofimovich. Praskovya arrives, accompanied by her nephew Mavriky Nikolaevich, demanding to know why her daughter has been dragged in to Varvara Petrovna's "scandal". Varvara Petrovna questions Dasha about a large sum of money that Nikolai Vsevolodovich supposedly sent through her to Marya's brother, but in spite of her straightforward answers matters don't become any clearer.

Marya's brother, the drunkard Captain Lebyadkin, comes looking for his sister and confuses Varvara Petrovna even further with semi-deranged rantings about some sort of dishonour that must remain unspoken. At this point the butler announces that Nikolai Vsevolodovich has arrived. To everyone's surprise, a complete stranger walks in and immediately begins to dominate the conversation. It turns out to be Pyotr Stepanovich Verkhovensky, Stepan Trofimovich's son. As he is talking, Nikolai Stavrogin quietly enters. Varvara Petrovna stops him imperiously and, indicating Marya, demands to know if she is his lawful wife. He looks at his mother impassively, says nothing, kisses her hand, and unhurriedly approaches Marya.

In soothing tones he explains to Marya that he is her devoted friend, not her husband or fiancé, that she should not be here, and that he will escort her home. She agrees and they leave. In the din that breaks out after their departure, the strongest voice is that of Pyotr Stepanovich, and he manages to persuade Varvara Petrovna to listen to his explanation for what has occurred. According to him, Nikolai Vsevolodovich became acquainted with the Lebyadkins when he was living a life of "mockery" in Petersburg five years earlier. The downtrodden, crippled, and half mad Marya had fallen hopelessly in love with him and he had responded by treating her "like a marquise".

She began to think of him as her fiancé, and when he left he made arrangements for her support, including a substantial allowance, which her brother proceeded to appropriate as though he had some sort of right to it. Varvara Petrovna is elated and almost triumphant to hear that her son's actions had a noble foundation rather than a shameful one. Under interrogation from Pyotr Stepanovich, Captain Lebyadkin reluctantly confirms the truth of the whole story.

He departs in disgrace as Nikolai Vsevolodovich returns from escorting Marya home. Nikolai Vsevolodovich addresses himself to Dasha with congratulations on her impending marriage, of which, he says, he was expressly informed. As if on cue, Pyotr Stepanovich says that he too has received a long letter from his father about an impending marriage, but that one cannot make sense of it—something about having to get married because of "another man's sins", and pleading to be "saved". An enraged Varvara Petrovna tells Stepan Trofimovich to leave her house and never come back.

In the uproar that follows, no-one notices Shatov, who has not said a word the entire time, walking across the room to stand directly in front of Nikolai Vsevolodovich. He looks him in the eye for a long time without saying anything, then suddenly hits him in the face with all his might. Stavrogin staggers, recovers himself, and seizes Shatov; but he immediately takes his hands away, and stands motionless, calmly returning Shatov's gaze. It is Shatov who lowers his eyes, and leaves, apparently crushed. Liza screams and collapses on the floor in a faint.

=== Part II ===
News of the events at Skvoreshniki spreads through society surprisingly rapidly. The main participants seclude themselves, with the exception of Pyotr Stepanovich who actively insinuates himself into the social life of the town. After eight days, he calls on Stavrogin and the true nature of their relations begins to become apparent. There was not, as some suspect, an explicit understanding between them. Rather Pyotr Stepanovich is trying to involve Stavrogin in some radical political plans of his own, and is avidly seeking to be of use to him. Stavrogin, while he seems to accept Pyotr Stepanovich acting on his behalf, is largely unresponsive to these overtures and continues to pursue his own agenda.

That night Stavrogin leaves Skvoreshniki in secret and makes his way on foot to Fillipov's house, where Shatov lives. The primary object of his visit is to consult his friend Kirillov, who also lives at the house. Stavrogin has received an extraordinarily insulting letter from Artemy Gaganov, the son of a respected landowner—Pavel Gaganov—whose nose he pulled as a joke some years earlier, and has been left with no choice but to challenge him to a duel. He asks Kirillov to be his second and to make the arrangements. They then discuss philosophical issues arising out of Kirillov's firm intention to commit suicide in the near future.

Stavrogin proceeds to Shatov, and once again the background to the events at Skvoreshniki begins to reveal itself. Shatov had guessed the secret behind Stavrogin's connection to Marya (they are in fact married) and had struck him out of anger at his "fall". In the past Stavrogin had inspired Shatov with exhortations of the Russian Christ, but this marriage and other actions have provoked a complete disillusionment, which Shatov now angrily expresses. Stavrogin defends himself calmly and rationally, but not entirely convincingly. He also warns Shatov, who is a former member but now bitter enemy of Pyotr Verkhovensky's revolutionary society, that Verkhovensky might be planning to murder him.

Stavrogin continues on foot to a distant part of town where he intends to call at the new residence of the Lebyadkins. On the way he encounters Fedka, an escaped convict, who has been waiting for him at the bridge. Pyotr Stepanovich has informed Fedka that Stavrogin may have need of his services in relation to the Lebyadkins, but Stavrogin emphatically rejects this. He tells Fedka that he won't give him a penny and that if he meets him again he will tie him up and take him to the police. At the Lebyadkins' he informs the Captain, to the Captain's horror, that in the near future he will be making a public announcement of the marriage and that there will be no more money.

He goes in to Marya, but something about him frightens her and she becomes mistrustful. His proposal that she come to live with him in Switzerland is met with scorn. She accuses him of being an imposter who has come to kill her with his knife, and demands to know what he has done with her "Prince". Stavrogin becomes angry, pushes her violently, and leaves, to Marya's frenzied curse. In a fury, he barely notices when Fedka pops up again, reiterating his requests for assistance. Stavrogin seizes him, slams him against a wall and begins to tie him up. However, he stops almost immediately and continues on his way, with Fedka following. Eventually Stavrogin bursts into laughter: he empties the contents of his wallet in Fedka's face, and walks off.

The duel takes place the following afternoon, but no-one is killed. To Gaganov's intense anger, Stavrogin appears to deliberately miss, as if to trivialize the duel and insult his opponent, although he says it is because he doesn't want to kill anyone any more. He returns to Skvoreshniki where he encounters Dasha who, as now becomes apparent, is in the role of a confidant and "nurse" in relation to him. He tells her about the duel and the encounter with Fedka, admitting to giving Fedka money that could be interpreted as a down payment to kill his wife. He asks her, in an ironic tone, whether she will still come to him even if he chooses to take Fedka up on his offer. Horrified, Dasha does not answer.

Pyotr Stepanovich meanwhile is very active in society, forming relationships and cultivating conditions that he thinks will help his political aims. He is particularly focused on Julia Mikhaylovna Von Lembke, the Governor's wife. By flattery, surrounding her with a retinue and encouraging her exaggerated liberal ambition, he acquires a power over her and over the tone of her salon. He and his group of co-conspirators exploit their new-found legitimacy to generate an atmosphere of frivolity and cynicism in society. They indulge in tasteless escapades, clandestinely distribute revolutionary propaganda, and agitate workers at the local Spigulin factory.

They are particularly active in promoting Julia Mikhaylovna's 'Literary Gala' to raise money for poor governesses, and it becomes a much anticipated event for the whole town. The Governor, Andrey Antonovich, is deeply troubled by Pyotr Stepanovich's success with his wife and casual disregard for his authority, but is painfully incapable of doing anything about it. Unable to cope with the strange events and mounting pressures, he begins to show signs of acute mental disturbance. Pyotr Stepanovich adopts a similarly destabilizing approach toward his father, driving Stepan Trofimovich into a frenzy by relentlessly ridiculing him and further undermining his disintegrating relationship with Varvara Petrovna.

Pyotr Stepanovich visits Kirillov to remind him of an "agreement" he made to commit suicide at a time convenient to the revolutionary society. He invites Kirillov, and subsequently Shatov, to a meeting of the local branch of the society to be held later that day. He then calls on Stavrogin, arriving just as Mavriky Nikolaevich, Liza's new fiancé, is angrily departing. Stavrogin, however, seems to be in a good mood and he willingly accompanies Pyotr Stepanovich to the meeting. Present are a wide variety of idealists, disaffected types and pseudo-intellectuals, most notably the philosopher Shigalyev who attempts to expound his theory on the historically necessary totalitarian social organization of the future.

The conversation is inane and directionless until Pyotr Stepanovich takes control and seeks to establish whether there is a real commitment to the cause of violent revolution. He claims that this matter can be resolved by asking a simple question of each individual: in the knowledge of a planned political murder, would you inform the police? As everyone else is hurrying to assert that they would of course not inform, Shatov gets up and leaves, followed by Stavrogin and Kirillov. Uproar ensues. Pyotr Stepanovich abandons the meeting and rushes after Stavrogin. Meeting them at Kirillov's place, where Fedka is also present, Verkhovensky demands to know whether Stavrogin will be providing the funds to deal with the Lebyadkins. He has acquired proof, in the form of a letter sent to Von Lembke, that the Captain is contemplating betraying them all.

Stavrogin refuses, tells him he won't give him Shatov either, and departs. Verkhovensky tries to stop him, but Stavrogin throws him to the ground and continues on his way. Verkhovensky rushes after him again and, to Stavrogin's astonishment, suddenly transforms into a raving madman. He launches into an incoherent monologue, alternately passionately persuasive and grovelingly submissive, desperately pleading with Stavrogin to join his cause. The speech amounts to a declaration of love, reaching a climax with the exclamation "Stavrogin, you're beautiful!" and an attempt to kiss his hand. Verkhovensky's cause, it turns out, has nothing to do with socialism, but is purely about destroying the old order and seizing power, with Stavrogin, the iron-willed leader, at the helm. Stavrogin remains cold, but does not actually say no, and Pyotr Stepanovich persists with his schemes.

Social disquiet escalates as the day of the literary gala approaches. The Governor's assistant, under the false impression that Stepan Trofimovich is the source of the problem, orders a raid on his residence. Deeply shocked, Stepan Trofimovich goes to the Governor to complain. He arrives as a large group of workers from the Spigulin factory are staging a protest about work and pay conditions. Already in a precarious state of mind, Andrey Antonovich responds to both problems in a somewhat demented authoritarian fashion.

Julia Mikhaylovna and her retinue, among whom are Varvara Petrovna and Liza, return from a visit to Skvoreshniki and the Governor is further humiliated by a public snubbing from his wife. As Julia Mikhaylovna engages charmingly with Stepan Trofimovich and the 'great writer' Karmazinov, who are to read at the Gala tomorrow, Pyotr Stepanovich enters. Seeing him, Andrey Antonovich begins to show signs of derangement.

Attention is immediately diverted to a new drama: Stavrogin has entered the room, and he is accosted by Liza. In a loud voice she complains of harassment from a certain Captain Lebyadkin, who describes himself as Stavrogin's relation, the brother of his wife. Stavrogin calmly replies that Marya (née Lebyadkina) is indeed his wife, and that he will make sure the Captain causes her no further trouble. Varvara Petrovna is horrified, but Stavrogin simply smiles and walks out. Liza follows him.

=== Part III ===
The much vaunted literary matinée and ball takes place the next day. Most of the town has subscribed and all the influential people are present for the reading, with the exception of the Stavrogins. Julia Mikhaylovna, who has somehow managed to reconcile Andrey Antonovich, is at the summit of her ambition. But things go wrong from the beginning. Pyotr Stepanovich's associates Lyamshin and Liputin take advantage of their role as stewards to alter proceedings in a provocative way, and allow a lot of low types in without paying. The reading starts with the unscheduled appearance on stage of a hopelessly drunk Captain Lebyadkin, apparently for the purpose of reading some of his poetry.

Realizing the Captain is too drunk, Liputin takes it upon himself to read the poem, which is a witless and insulting piece about the hard lot of governesses. He is quickly followed by the literary genius Karmazinov who is reading a farewell to his public entitled "Merci". For over an hour the great writer plods through an aimless stream of self-absorbed fantasy, sending the audience into a state of complete stupefaction. The torture only comes to an end when an exhausted listener inadvertently cries out "Lord, what rubbish!" and Karmazinov, after exchanging insults with the audience, finally closes with an ironic "Merci, merci, merci."

In this hostile atmosphere Stepan Trofimovich takes the stage. He plunges headlong into a passionate exhortation of his own aesthetic ideals, becoming increasingly shrill as he reacts to the derision emanating from the audience. He ends by cursing them and storming off. Pandemonium breaks out as an unexpected third reader, a 'professor' from Petersburg, immediately takes the stage in his place. Apparently delighted by the disorder, the new orator launches into a frenzied tirade against Russia, shouting with all his might and gesticulating with his fist. He is eventually dragged off stage by six officials, but he somehow manages to escape and returns to briefly continue his harangue before being dragged off again. Supporters in the audience rush to his aid as a schoolgirl takes the stage seeking to rouse oppressed students everywhere to protest.

In the aftermath, Pyotr Stepanovich, who was mysteriously absent from the reading, seeks to persuade a traumatized Julia Mikhaylovna that it wasn't as bad as she thinks and that it is essential for her to attend the ball. He also lets her know that the town is ringing with the news of another scandal: Lizaveta Nikolaevna has left her home and fiancé and gone off to Skvoreshniki with Stavrogin.

Despite the failure of the reading, the ball takes place that evening, attended by Julia Mikhaylovna and Andrey Antonovich. Many members of respectable society choose not to attend, while the number of less reputable guests increases, with many heading directly to the drinking area. Few guests dance; most stand around waiting for something to happen and observing the Von Lembkes with curiosity. A "literary quadrille" has been specially choreographed for the occasion, but its execution is regarded as vulgar and foolish, leaving the spectators more bemused than entertained.

Shocked by some of the antics in the quadrille and the degenerating atmosphere in the hall, Andrey Antonovich lapses back into his authoritarian persona and a frightened Julia Mikhaylovna is forced to apologise for him. Someone shouts "Fire!" and the news quickly spreads that a large fire is raging in part of the town. There is a stampede for the exits, but Andrey Antonovich screams that all must be searched, and when his distressed wife calls out his name he orders her arrest. Julia Mikhaylovna faints. She is carried to safety.

Andrey Antonovich insists on going to the fire. At the fire he is knocked unconscious by a falling beam, and although he later recovers consciousness, he does not recover his sanity, and his career as governor comes to an end. The fire rages all night, but by morning it has dwindled and rain is falling. News begins to spread of a strange and terrible murder: a certain Captain, his sister and their serving maid have been found stabbed to death in their partially burned down house on the edge of town.

Stavrogin and Liza have spent the night together and they wake to the dying glow of the fire. Liza is ready to leave him, convinced that her life is over. Pyotr Stepanovich arrives to impart the news of the Lebyadkins' murder. He says the murderer was Fedka the Convict, denies any involvement himself, and assures Stavrogin that legally (and of course morally) he too is in the clear. When Liza demands the truth from Stavrogin, he replies that he was against the murder but knew it was going to happen and didn't stop the murderers. Liza rushes off in a frenzy, determined to get to the place of the murders to see the bodies.

Stavrogin tells Pyotr Stepanovich to stop her, but Pyotr Stepanovich demands an answer. Stavrogin replies that it might be possible to say yes to him if only he were not such a buffoon, and tells him to come back tomorrow. Appeased, Pyotr Stepanovich pursues Liza, but the attempt to stop her is abandoned when Mavriky Nikolaevich, who has been waiting for her outside all night, rushes to her aid. He and Liza proceed to the town together in the pouring rain. At the scene of the murders an unruly crowd has gathered. By this time it is known that it is Stavrogin's wife who has been murdered, and Liza is recognized as 'Stavrogin's woman'. She and Mavriky Nikolaevich are attacked by drunk and belligerent individuals in the crowd. Liza is struck several times on the head and is killed.

Most of society's anger for the night's events is directed toward Julia Mikhaylovna. Pyotr Stepanovich is not suspected, and news spreads that Stavrogin has left on the train for Petersburg. The revolutionary crew, however, are alarmed. They are on the point of mutiny until Pyotr Stepanovich shows them Lebyadkin's letter to Von Lembke. He points to their own undeniable involvement and tells them that Shatov is also determined to denounce them. They agree that Shatov will have to be killed and a plan is made to lure him to the isolated location where he has buried the society's printing press.

Pyotr Stepanovich explains that Kirillov has agreed to write a note taking responsibility for their crimes before he commits suicide. Shatov is preoccupied with the unexpected return of his ex-wife Marie, who has turned up on his doorstep, alone, ill and poverty-stricken. He is overjoyed to see her, and when it turns out that she is going into labour with Stavrogin's child he frantically sets about helping her. The child is born and, reconciled with Marie, he is happy that he is going to be the father. That night the emissary from the revolutionary group—Erkel—arrives to escort Shatov to the isolated part of Skvoreshniki where the printing press is buried.

Thinking this will be his final interaction with the society, Shatov agrees to come. As he shows Erkel the spot, the other members of the group jump out and grab him. Pyotr Verkhovensky puts a gun to Shatov's forehead and fires, killing him. As they clumsily weight the body and dump it in the pond, one of the participants in the crime—Lyamshin—completely loses his head and starts shrieking like an animal. He is restrained and eventually quietened, and they go their separate ways. Early the following morning Pyotr Stepanovich proceeds to Kirillov's place. Kirillov has been forewarned and is eagerly awaiting him.

However, his aversion to Pyotr Stepanovich and the news of Shatov's death arouse a reluctance to comply, and for some time they parley, both with guns in hand. Eventually Kirillov seems to be overcome by the power of his desire to kill himself and despite his misgivings he hurriedly writes and signs the suicide note taking responsibility for the crimes, and runs into the next room. But there is no shot, and Pyotr Stepanovich cautiously follows him into the darkened room. A strange and harrowing confrontation ends with Pyotr Stepanovich fleeing in a panic. A shot rings out and he returns to find that Kirillov has shot himself through the head.

Meanwhile, Stepan Trofimovich, oblivious to the unfolding horrors, has left town on foot, determined to take the high road to an uncertain future. Wandering along with no real purpose or destination, he is offered a lift by some peasants. They take him to their village where he meets Sofya Matveyevna, a travelling gospel seller, and he firmly attaches himself to her. They set off together but Stepan Trofimovich becomes ill and they are forced to take a room at a large cottage. He tells Sofya Matveyevna a somewhat embellished version of his life story and pleads with her not to leave him.

To his horror, Varvara Petrovna suddenly turns up at the cottage. She has been looking for him since his disappearance, and her ferocity greatly frightens both Stepan Trofimovich and Sofya Matveyevna. When she realizes that he is extremely ill and that Sofya Matveyevna has been looking after him, her attitude softens and she sends for her doctor. A difficult reconciliation between the two friends, during which some painful events from the past are recalled, is effected. It becomes apparent that Stepan Trofimovich is dying and a priest is summoned. In his final conscious hours he recognizes the deceit of his life, forgives others, and makes an ecstatic speech expressing his re-kindled love of God.

When Shatov fails to return, Marie, still exhausted from the birth, seeks out Kirillov. Encountering the terrible scene of the suicide, she grabs her newborn baby and rushes outside into the cold, desperately seeking help. Eventually the authorities are called to the scene. They read Kirillov's note and a short time later Shatov's body is discovered at Skvoreshniki. Marie and the baby become ill, and die a few days later.

The crime scene at Skvoreshniki reveals that Kirillov must have been acting with others and the story emerges that there is an organized group of revolutionary conspirators behind all the crimes and disorders. Paranoia grips the town, but all is revealed when Lyamshin, unable to bear it, makes a groveling confession to the authorities. He tells the story of the conspiracy in great detail, and the rest of the crew, with the exception of Pyotr Stepanovich who left for Petersburg after Kirillov's suicide, are arrested.

Varvara Petrovna, returning to her town house after Stepan Trofimovich's death, is greatly shaken by all the terrible news. Darya Pavlovna receives a disturbing letter from Nikolai Vsevolodovich, which she shows to Varvara Petrovna. News arrives from Skvoreshniki that Nikolai Vsevolodovich is there and has locked himself away without saying a word to anyone. They hurry over, and find that Nikolai Vsevolodovich has hanged himself.

=== Censored chapter ===
The editor of The Russian Messenger, Mikhail Katkov, refused to publish the chapter "At Tikhon's". The chapter concerns Stavrogin's visit to the monk Tikhon at the local monastery, during which he confesses, in the form of a lengthy and detailed written document, to taking sexual advantage of a downtrodden and vulnerable 11-year-old girl—Matryosha—and then waiting and listening as she goes through the process of hanging herself. He describes his marriage to Marya Lebyadkina as a deliberate attempt to cripple his own life, largely as a consequence of his inability to forget this episode and the fear he experienced in its aftermath.

Dostoevsky considered the chapter to be essential to an understanding of the psychology of Stavrogin, and he tried desperately but unsuccessfully to save it through revisions and concessions to Katkov. He was eventually forced to drop it and rewrite parts of the novel that dealt with its subject matter. He never included the chapter in subsequent publications of the novel, but it is generally included in modern editions as an appendix. It has also been published separately, translated from Russian to English by S.S. Koteliansky and Virginia Woolf, with an essay on Dostoevsky by Sigmund Freud.

== Themes ==
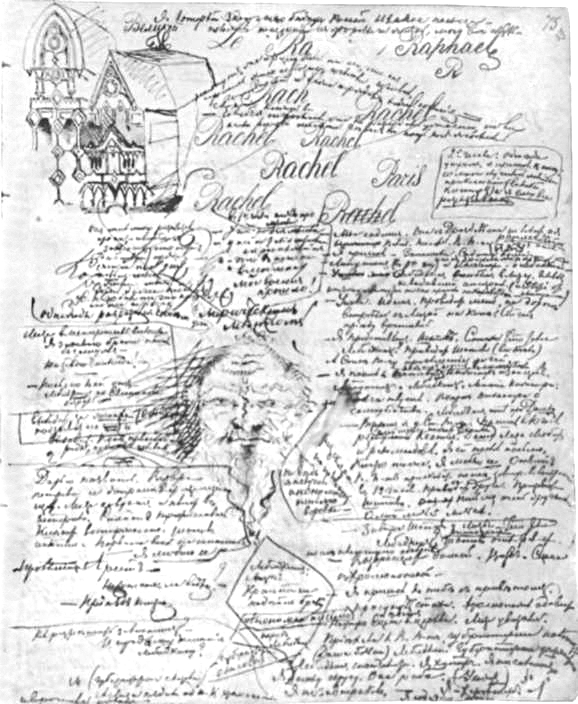
A page from Dostoevsky's notebooks for Demons

=== Atheism and belief ===
In March 1870, Dostoevsky wrote to Maykov that the chief theme of his novel was "the very one over which, consciously and unconsciously, I have been tormented all my life: it is the existence of God." Much of the plot develops out of the tension between belief and non-belief, and the words and actions of most of the characters seem to be intimately bound to the position they take up within this struggle.

Dostoevsky saw atheism as the root cause of Russia's deepening social problems. He further wrote to Maykov on October 9, 1870: "a man who loses his people and his national roots also loses the faith of his fathers and his God." It is in this letter that he speaks, referring primarily to Stavrogin and secondarily to Stepan Verkhovensky, of the 'Russian Man' as comparable to the man possessed by demons who is healed by Jesus in the parable of the swine.

In Demons, the Russian man has lost his true national identity, inextricably linked, for Dostoevsky, with the Orthodox Christian faith, and tries to fill the void with ideas derived from Western modes of thought—Catholicism, atheism, scientism, socialism, idealism, etc. As teachers and strong personalities, Stavrogin and Stepan Trofimovich influence those around them, and thus the demons enter the swine. Only at the end, after a heartfelt acknowledgment of their fault, are they given the possibility of redemption—Stavrogin when Tikhon offers him life as a Christian renunciate (an offer that Stavrogin refuses) and Stepan Trofimovich as he approaches death.

Instead of belief in God, Stavrogin has rationality, intellect, self-reliance, and egoism, but the spiritual longing and sensual ardour of his childhood, over-stimulated by his teacher Stepan Trofimovich, has never left him. Unfettered by fear or morality, his life has become a self-centred experiment and a heartless quest to overcome the torment of his growing ennui. The most striking manifestation of his dilemma is in the dialogue with Tikhon, where we find him, perhaps for the only time, truthfully communicating his inner state. In this dialogue there is an alternation in his speech between the stern, worldly voice of rational self-possession and the vulnerable, confessional voice of the lost and suffering soul.

Many of the other characters are deeply affected by one or other of the two aspects of Stavrogin's psyche. The nihilist Pyotr Verkhovensky is in love with the cynical, amoral, power-seeking side, while Shatov is affected by the ardour of the feeling, spiritually-bereft side. Shatov "rose from the dead" after hearing Stavrogin's uncompromising exhortation of Christ as the supreme ideal (an assertion made in a futile effort to convince himself: he succeeds in convincing Shatov but not himself).

Conversely, Kirillov was convinced by Stavrogin's exhortation of atheism—the supremacy of Man's will, not God's—and forges a plan to sacrifice himself to free humanity from its bondage to mystical fear. But Stavrogin himself does not even believe in his own atheism and, as Shatov and Tikhon recognize, drives himself further into evil out of a desire to torture himself and avoid the truth. Kirillov sums up Stavrogin's dilemma thus: "If Stavrogin believes, then he doesn't believe that he believes. But if he doesn't believe, then he doesn't believe that he doesn't believe."

=== Suicide ===
Dostoevsky saw Russia's growing suicide rate as a symptom of the decline of religious faith and the concomitant disintegration of social institutions like the family. Self-destruction as a result of atheism or loss of faith is a major theme in Demons and further recalls the metaphor of the demon-possessed swine in the epigraph.

In addition to a number of extended dialogues on the subject, mostly involving Kirillov, there are four actual suicides described in the novel. The first is in anecdotal form, told by the narrator after the pranksters associated with Julia Mikaylovna pay a visit to the scene of a suicide. Entrusted with a large sum of money by his family, a hitherto quiet and responsible young man deliberately squanders it all on riotous living over a period of several days. Returning to his hotel, he calmly and politely orders a meal and some wine, writes a short note, and shoots himself through the heart.

The first plot-related suicide is that of Kirillov. Kirillov is a kind of philosopher of suicide and, under questioning from several interlocutors (the narrator, Stavrogin, Pyotr Verkhovensky), expounds his ideas on the subject, mostly as it relates to him personally but also as a general phenomenon. According to him there are two types of people who commit suicide: those who do it suddenly upon being overwhelmed by an unbearable emotion, and those who do it after much thought for good reason. He thinks that everyone could fall into the latter category if it were not for two prejudices: fear of pain, and fear of the next world. "God" he says, "is the pain of the fear of death. Whoever conquers pain and fear will himself become God." In his mind he is the man who, by his own intentional death, will demonstrate to humanity the transcendence of pain and fear and free them of the need to invent God.

Stavrogin's suicide at the end of the novel is only fully understood with reference to the censored chapter. The enormity of his crimes, the desolation of his inner being, the madness born of his "sacrilegious, proto-Nietzschean attempt to transcend the boundaries of good and evil", are hidden realities that only become visible in the confession and dialogue with Tikhon. Despite this 'madness', it is 'rationality' that is emphasized in the narrator's description of the suicide itself. The efficiency of the procedure, the brief, precise note, and the subsequent medical opinion of his mental state emphatically ruling out madness, all point to his 'reasonable' state of mind at the time of the act.

The final suicide is that of the little girl Matryosha, described by Stavrogin in his confessional letter. After her encounter with Stavrogin, she tells her mother that she has "killed God". When she hangs herself Stavrogin is present in the next room and aware of what she is doing.

== Commentary ==
=== Demons as satire ===
A common criticism of Demons, particularly from Dostoevsky's liberal and radical contemporaries, is that it is exaggerated and unrealistic, a result of the author's over-active imagination and excessive interest in the psycho-pathological. However, despite giving freedom to his imagination, Dostoevsky took great pains to derive the novel's characters and story from real people and real ideas of the time. According to Frank, "the book is almost a compressed encyclopedia of the Russian culture of the period it covers, filtered through a witheringly derisive and often grotesquely funny perspective, and it creates a remarkable 'myth' of the main conflicts of this culture reconstructed on a firm basis of historical personages and events."

Almost all of the principal characters, or at least their individual guiding ideas, had actually existing contemporary prototypes. Stavrogin was partly based on Dostoevsky's comrade from the Petrashevsky Circle, Nikolay Speshnev, and represented an imagined extreme in practice of an amoral, atheistic philosophy like that of Max Stirner. The darkness of Stavrogin is confronted by the radiance of Bishop Tikhon, a character inspired by Tikhon of Zadonsk.

Of Pyotr Verkhovensky, Dostoevsky said that the character is not a portrait of Nechayev but that "my aroused mind has created by imagination the person, the type, that corresponds to the crime... To my own surprise he half turns out to be a comic figure." Most of the nihilist characters associated with Pyotr Verkhovensky were based on individuals who appeared in the transcripts of the trial of the Nechayevists, which were publicly available and studied by Dostoevsky. The character of Shatov represents a Russian nationalist response to socialist ideas, and was initially based on Nechayev's victim Ivanov, but later on the contemporary slavophile ideas of Danilevsky and to some extent on Dostoevsky's own reformed ideas about Russia.

Stepan Verkhovensky began as a caricature of Granovsky, and retained the latter's neurotic susceptibilities, academic interests, and penchant for writing long confessional letters, but the character was grounded in the idealistic tendencies of many others from the generation of the 1840s, including Herzen, Belinsky, Chaadaev, Turgenev, and Dostoevsky himself. Liberal figures like Stepan Trofimovich, Varvara Petrovna, Liputin, Karmazinov, and the Von Lembkes, and minor authority figures like the old Governor Osip Osipovich and the over-zealous policeman Flibusterov, are parodies of a variety of establishment types that Dostoevsky held partially responsible for the excesses of the radical generation. Karmazinov was an openly hostile parody of Turgenev—his personality and mannerisms, his perceived complicity with nihilism, and, in the Gala reading scene, the style of some of his later literary works.

Even the most extreme and unlikely characters, such as Kirillov and Shigalev, were grounded in real people or ideas of the time. Kirillov was initially inspired by a Nechayev associate who spoke openly at the trial of his plan to commit suicide, but the apocalyptic philosophy the character builds around his obsession is grounded in an interpretation of the anthropotheistic ideas of Feuerbach. Shigalev was initially based on the radical critic V.A. Zaitsev who advocated a form of Social Darwinism that included, for example, an argument that without the protection of slavery the black race would become extinct due to its inherent inferiority.

Shigalev's notion of human equality, the "earthly paradise" in which nine tenths of humanity are to be deprived of their will and turned into a slave-herd by means of a program of inter-generational 're-education', had a contemporary prototype in the ideas of Petr Tkachev. Tkachev argued that the only biologically possible 'equality' for human beings was "an organic, physiological equality conditioned by the same education and common living conditions" and he saw this as the supreme goal of all historical and social progress.

=== As prophecy ===
Kjetsaa claims that Dostoevsky did not regard Revelation as "merely a consolatory epistle to first century Christians during the persecution they suffered", but as a "prophecy being fulfilled in his own time". Dostoevsky wrote that "Communism will conquer one day, irrespective of whether the Communists are right or wrong. But this triumph will stand very far from the Kingdom of Heaven. All the same, we must accept that this triumph will come one day, even though none of those who at present steer the world's fate have any idea about it at all."

Since the Russian Revolution, many commentators have remarked on the prophetic nature of Demons. André Gide, writing in the early 1920s, suggested that "the whole of (the novel) prophesies the revolution of which Russia is presently in the throes". In Soviet Russia, a number of dissident authors found a prototype for the Soviet police state in the system expounded by Shigalev at the meeting of Pyotr Verkhovensky's revolutionary society. Boris Pasternak, Igor Shafarevich, and Alexander Solzhenitsyn have called Dostoevsky's description of Shigalevism prophetic, anticipating the systematic politicide which followed the October Revolution. Pasternak often used the term "Shigalevism" (shigalevshchina) to refer to Joseph Stalin's Great Purge. According to Richard Pevear, Dostoevsky even presaged the appearance of Lenin himself with his description of the final reader at the ill-fated literary gala: "a man of about forty, bald front and back, with a grayish little beard, who...keeps raising his fist over his head and bringing it down as if crushing some adversary to dust."

Dostoevsky biographer Ronald Hingley described the novel as "an awesome, prophetic warning which humanity, no less possessed of collective and individual devilry in the 1970s than in the 1870s, shows alarmingly few signs of heeding." Robert L. Belknap notes its relevance to the twentieth century in general, "when a few Stavrogins empowered thousands of Pyotr Stepanovichs to drive herds of 'capital', to use Nechayev's term, to slaughter about a hundred million people, the very number Shigalyev and Pyotr hit upon." In his book Dostoyevsky in Manhattan French philosopher André Glucksmann argued that 'nihilism', as depicted in Demons, is the underlying idea or 'characteristic form' of modern terrorism.

== English translations ==
This is a list of the unabridged English translations of the novel:

1. Constance Garnett (1914, as The Possessed) - the only translation currently available freely in public domain
2. David Magarshack (1953, as The Devils)
3. Andrew R. MacAndrew (1962, as The Possessed)
4. Julius Katzer (1981, as Devils) for Progress Publishers in Moscow.
5. Michael R. Katz (1992, as Devils)
6. Richard Pevear and Larissa Volokhonsky (1994)
7. Robert A. Maguire (2008)
8. Roger Cockrell (2018, as Devils)

=== Suppressed Chapter ===
1. Stavrogin's Confession by Samuel Solomonovich Koteliansky and Virginia Woolf (1922)
2. At Tikhon's by Avrahm Yarmolinsky (1936) with a Foreword - also freely available in public domain
3. Stavrogin's Confession by F. D. Reeve (1961)

== Adaptations ==
- 1913, play produced by the Moscow Art Theater.
- 1959, French play The Possessed written by Albert Camus.
- 1969, BBC mini-series The Possessed adapted by Hugh Leonard starring Keith Bell; also broadcast on PBS television in 1972.
- 1988, French film Les Possédés adapted by Andrzej Wajda.
- 2009, "...the itsy bitsy spider..." adapted by Alexandre Marine for Studio Six Theatre Company.
- 2014, Russian mini-series by Russia-1 and post-modern film.
- 2021, BBC Radio 4 mini-series Devils adapted by Melissa Murray starring Joseph Arkley, Jonathan Forbes, Georgia Henshaw and Jane Whittenshaw.

== Bibliography ==
- Bakhtin, Mikhail (1984). Problems of Dostoevsky's Poetics. Translated by Caryl Emerson. University Of Minnesota Press. ISBN 9780816612277.
- Dostoevsky, Fyodor (1995). Demons: A Novel in Three Parts. Translated by Larissa Volokhonsky; Richard Pevear. Foreword by Richard Pevear (1st ed.). Vintage Classics. ISBN 9780679734512.
- Dostoevsky, Fyodor (2008). Ronald Meyer (ed.). Demons. Translator Robert A. Maguire. Introduction by Robert L. Belknap. Penguin Classics. ISBN 9780141441412.
- Frank, Joseph (2010). Dostoevsky: A Writer in his Time. Princeton University Press. ISBN 9780691128191.
- Hingley, Ronald (1978). Dostoyevsky His Life and Work (1st ed.). London: Paul Elek Limited. ISBN 9780236401215.
- Kjetsaa, Geir (1987). Fyodor Dostoyevsky. Translated by David McDuff; Siri Hustvedt (1st ed.). Viking Adult. ISBN 9780670819140.
- Peace, Richard Arthur (1971). Dostoyevsky: An Examination of the Major Novels (1st ed.). Cambridge University Press. ISBN 9780521079112.
- Wasiolek, Edward (1964). Dostoevsky: The Major Fiction. Cambridge MA: MIT Press.
