= Sergey Durov =

Russian poet, translator, writer, and political activist

Sergey Fyodorovich Durov
- Сергей Фёдорович Дуров
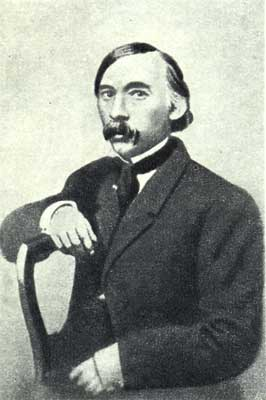
- Born: January 15, 1815; Oryol Governorate, Russian Empire
- Died: December 18, 1869 (aged 54); Poltava, Ukraine (then Russian Empire)
- Occupations: poet, translator, political activist
- Years active: 1830s – 1869

Sergey Fyodorovich Durov (Russian: Серге́й Фёдорович Ду́ров, January 15 [O.S. 3 January] 1815 – December 18 [O.S. 6 December], 1869) was a Russian poet, translator, writer, and political activist. A member of the Petrashevsky Circle and later the leader of his own underground group of intellectuals, Durov was arrested in 1849 and spent 8 months in the Petropavloskaya Fortress, followed by 4 years in Omsk prison.

Durov returned from Siberia in 1857, and the ban on his literary activity was lifted in 1862. But, broken physically by his long ordeal, he fell critically ill soon after and died at the age of 54.

== Biography ==
Sergey Fyodorovich Durov was born in the Oryol Governorate in the family of a minor nobleman. His father, an army colonel, died penniless in 1834. The boy's education in the Nobility Boarding school at the Saint Petersburg University (1828-1833) was paid for by his uncle on his mother side, Nikolai Khmelnitsky, a well-known playwright of his time. From 1833 to 1847 Durov worked as a civil servant, before retiring and making literature his profession. Most of his works—poems, short stories and novellas—were published in almanacs, magazines and newspapers from 1843 to 1849, prior to the arrest.

In late 1847 Durov began attending Petrashevsky's Fridays. In the spring of 1849, dissatisfied with what he saw as the chaotic nature of these meetings, he—along with his friends Alexander Palm and A.D.Shchelkov—organised another underground circle, which included brothers Fyodor and Mikhail Dostoyevsky, Aleksey Pleshcheyev, Nikolay Speshnev, Nikolai Grigoriev, P.N.Filippov, V.A. Golovinsky and F.N.Lvov. The social and economical situation in Russia was taken as the main issue. Among the documents read there was the banned Belinsky's Letter to Gogol, and "The Soldier Talk" (Soldatskaya beseda), the first ever document propagating revolutionary ideas in the Russian army. Four of the circle members, Speshnev, Dostoyevsky, Filippov and Lvov, decided to organize an underground lithograph. Durov disliked the idea and in April 1849 declared his 'evenings' closed.

On April 23, 1849, Durov was arrested and spent 8 months in a single camera in the Petropavlovskaya Fortress. Along with the other Petrashevtsy he was taken to the parade ground of the Semionovsky Regiment in Saint Petersburg, and lined up for execution. At the last moment the execution was stopped and it was revealed that his sentence had been commuted to katorga. Durov, along with Fyodor Dostoevsky, was sent in chains to Omsk, where he was to spend 8 years in a convict colony and the rest of his life as a soldier in Siberia. That sentence was reduced to 4 years as a Prisoner by Nicholas I. The sentence only commenced when the convicts entered the Prison at Omsk. Dostoyevsky wrote about his experience as a convict in Omsk in his memoir-novel Notes from the House of the Dead.

After Durov's release he spent one year serving in the army as a soldier, then retired due to ill health and settled in Omsk. Having received permission to leave Siberia, he went to Odessa and stayed at his friend Palm's house. There he died in 1869, after a long illness.

== Legacy ==
As a poet, Durov was noticed by Vissarion Belinsky who reviewed his "Molodik" poem (1844) positively, yet opined that the author was "notable more for his earnestness than talent." Influenced by Lermontov, Baratynsky and Tyutchev, Durov, according to biographer O.Bogdanova, still left several "really exciting pieces, marked by fine sparseness, energy and tightness." Durov translated many poems by Victor Hugo, André Marie de Chénier, Lord Byron, Adam Mickiewicz and is credited with "being the first and, arguably, the best" Russian translator of Henri Auguste Barbier. Durov's short stories had a strong "natural school" component. His sketches (with the exception of "The Auntie" and "Khalatnik") and novellas ("Somebody Else’s Child", "A Novel in Notes") were hardly original, according to Bogdanova.

While Sergey Durov's literary legacy is lean, the strength of his personality made a deep impression upon the people who knew him, particularly Petrashevsky's cohorts (Pleshcheev, N.Grigoriev, A.P.Milyukov) and members of his own circle (Ch.Valikhanov, G.N.Potanin, Viktor Burenin and others). He became the prototype of Rudkovsky (in Alexander Palm's novel Alexey Slobodin), and Sornev (Pavel Kovalevsky's Life’s Summary). Several poets, including Pleshcheev dedicated poems to Sergey Durov.

== Select bibliography ==
- Somebody Else’s Child (Chuzhoye ditya, Чужое дитя. 1846, short novel)
- "Publius Sirus" (Публиус Сирус, 1847, short story)
- "Khalatnik" (Халатник, 1847, short story)
- "A Novel in Notes" (Roman v zapiskakh, Роман в записках, 1847)
- Auntie (Tyotinka, Тетинька, 1848, short novel)
- "A Sad Story With a Happy End" (Grustnaya povest s vesyolym kontsom, Грустная повесть с веселым концом, 1848, short novel)
