= Ivan Surikov =

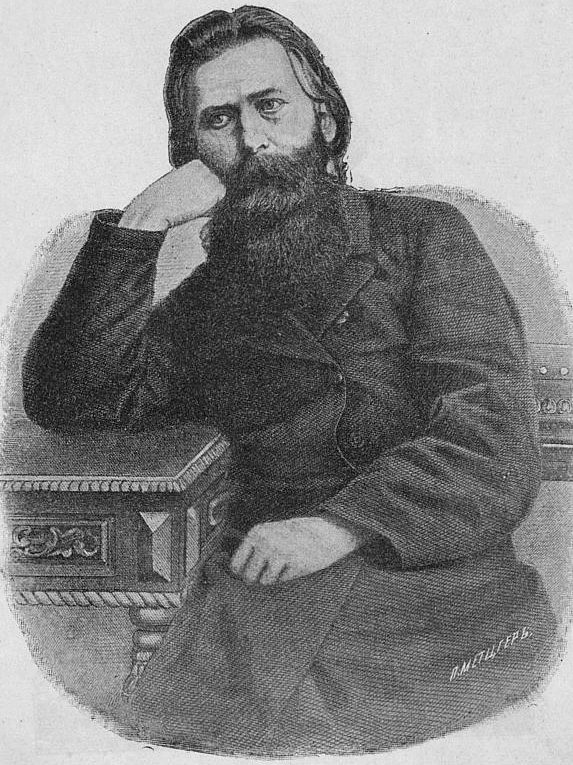
- Born: Ivan Zakharovich Surikov; 6 April 1841; Uglich, Yaroslavl, Russia
- Died: 6 May 1880 (aged 39); Moscow
- Occupation: Poet
- Writing career
- Period: 1870-1880

Signature
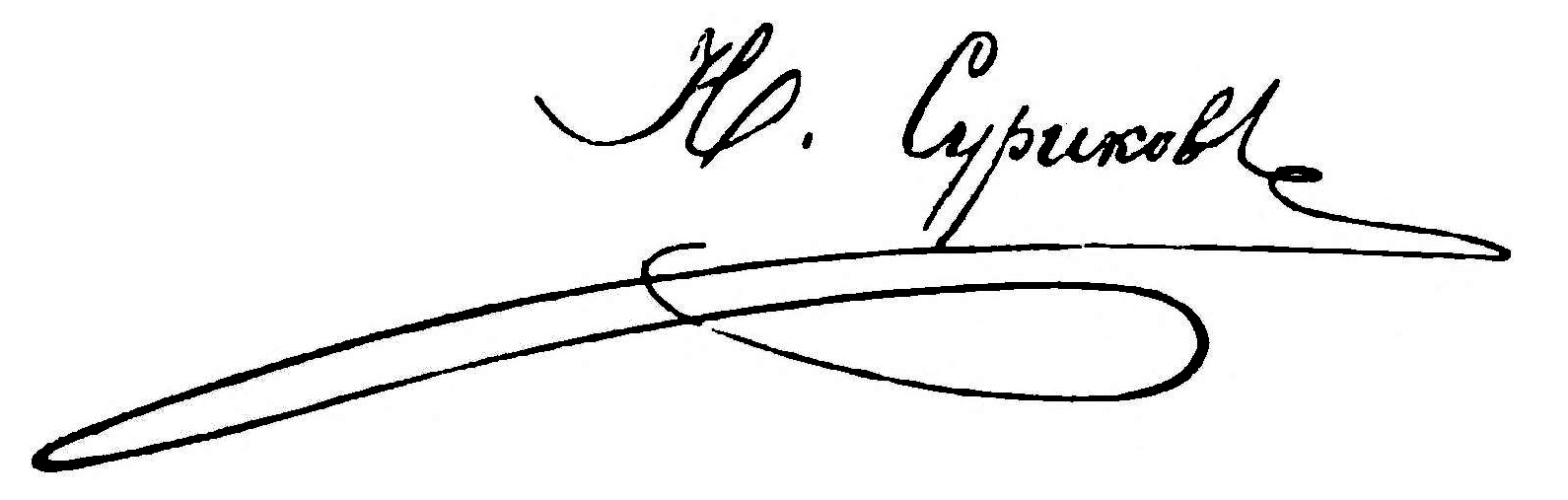

Ivan Zakharovich Surikov (Russian: Ива́н Заха́рович Су́риков, April 6, 1841, Novosyolovo, Uglich, Yaroslavl, Russian Empire– May 6, 1880, Moscow) was a Russian self-taught peasant poet, best known for his folklore-influenced ballads, some of which were put to music by well-known composers (Tchaikovsky, Cui, Rimsky-Korsakov, Gretchaninov among them), while some ("Rowan", "Steppe" and others) became real folk songs.

== Biography ==
Ivan Surikov was born in Novosyolovo village near Uglich, son of Zakhar Adrianovich Surikov, a rent-paying peasant who worked for Count Sheremetyev. Ivan spent the first eight years of his life in the village with his mother and grandmother, then in 1849 moved to Moscow where his father had started a small grocery shop at Ordynka. Neighbouring nuns taught the boy reading and writing; soon he became acquainted with Russian poetry and started to write himself, Aleksey Merzlyakov and Nikolay Tsyganov's songs providing the primary impulse. His father deemed book-reading to be harmful to good trader's mentality, but Ivan persisted in studying. In the late 1850s the shop went bust, and Zakhar Surikov returned to Novosyolovo, leaving the boy as an employee at a shop owned by his uncle, suffering from near-poverty and humiliation. In 1859 father returned to Moscow where he bought another shop and started trading in iron and coal, bringing his son in, as an aid.

=== Career ===
In 1860 Ivan Surikov sent a notebook with his own verses to Aleksey Pleshcheyev and was encouraged by the poet's favorable response. "Originality, soulfulness and deep passion" were the qualities Pleshcheyev liked best. Also in 1860 Surikov married Maria Ermakova, a girl from a poor family, who proved to be his devoted friend and a great help in his life. In 1864 Ivan's mother died, his father remarried and life in the latter's house became unbearable. Ivan rented a flat with his wife, and from then on was making a living by taking part-time jobs, like that of a type-setter.

In the late 1860s Surikov met two poets, Alexander Levitov and Filipp Nefyodov, who helped him get his verses published in magazines like Delo, Otechestvennye Zapiski, and Semya i Shkola. In 1871 his debut collection Poems came out (to be re-issued in 1875 and 1877). The leftist critics greeted the newcomer but deplored the rather limited thematic scope (peasant's hardships, stepmother's cruelty, set marriages, etc.) of his work. In the early 1870s Surikov began corresponding with other self-taught poets from all over the country. The Rassvet (Sunrise) anthology came as a result, featuring poems by A.Bakulin, S.Derunov and D.Zharov among others. In 1875, he became a member of the Russian Literature Society (nominated by Fyodor Buslayev, and supported by Leo Tolstoy). His next project, a literary magazine exclusively for authors from the lower classes, failed to materialize. In the late 1870s Ivan Surikov fell ill with tuberculosis. He died in Moscow in 1880, at the peak of his creativity.

=== Legacy ===
Ivan Surikov's legacy is usually seen as part of the tradition set by the two major Russian folklorist poets, Aleksey Koltsov and Ivan Nikitin. Yet, while both of his spiritual forefathers employed traditional Russian folklore structures and motives as a template and, while being masters of the 'landscape poetry', could hardly be described as storytellers, Surikov's poems usually had plots and were full of drama, albeit of a simplistic brand, featuring only "strong", straightforward feelings, devoid of emotional undertones.

Koltsov and Nikitin prospered at a time when the popularity of classic folklore in Russia reached its peak; Surikov's legacy could be seen as set against the background of its decline, when frivolous and vulgar motifs were debasing folk tradition, now more part of the new proto-industrial culture rather than patriarchal rural Russia. Surikov, with his gallery of lower class urban characters (tailors, manual labourers, homeless people, wanderers) is often regarded as a founder of what later would be termed 'Russian urban romance'. His ballads were song-like in structure, and people who knew him remembered how he "tried out" each new piece by singing it aloud.

Surikov had his "peasant cycle" too, but again, its poems were generic, protagonists representing "the voice of the common people," rather than putting forward personal views. Being first and foremost a storyteller, Surikov never went for elaborate plotlines. Even the democratic press which supported the self-taught 'people's poet', deplored the narrowness of his artistic spectrum which embraced trials and tribulations only of the most trivial kind (hardships of poverty, grievances of set marriage, stepmother's cruelty, etc.).
