= Mikhail Petrashevsky =

Russian revolutionary and Utopian theorist (1821–1866)

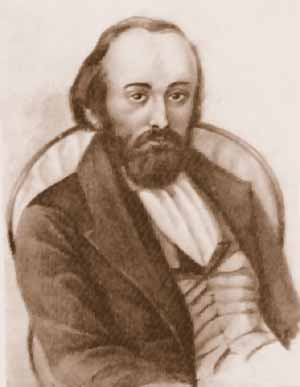
- Born: Mikhail Vasilyevich Butashevich-Petrashevsky; 13 November [O.S. 1 November] 1821; Saint Petersburg, Russian Empire
- Died: 19 December [O.S. 7 December] 1866; Minusinsk, Russian Empire

Mikhail Vasilyevich Butashevich-Petrashevsky (Russian: Михаил Васильевич Буташевич-Петрашевский; 13 November [O.S. 1 November] 1821 – 19 December [O.S. 7 December] 1866), commonly known as Mikhail Petrashevsky, was a Russian Utopian theorist, best known for his central role in the activities of the Petrashevsky Circle, a literary discussion group in Saint Petersburg in the 1840s.

== Biography ==
=== Early life ===
Mikhail Petrashevsky graduated from the Tsarskoye Selo Lyceum (1839) and Saint Petersburg State University with a degree in law (1841). He was then employed as a translator and interpreter at the Ministry of Foreign Affairs.

Petrashevsky is known to have edited and authored most of the theoretical articles for the Pocket Dictionary of Foreign Words (1846), which popularized democratic and materialist ideas and principles of utopian socialism.

=== Political activism and the Petrashevsky Circle ===
In 1844, Petrashevsky's apartment became the venue for social gatherings of intellectuals, which from 1845 took place on a weekly basis. These meetings were later dubbed pyatnitsy ("Fridays") and those attending them would be known as Petrashevtsy. The latter came to Petrashevsky's house and used his personal library, which contained banned books on materialist philosophy, utopian socialism, and history of revolutionary movements.

Among the well-known members of the young intelligentsia who participated in the Petrashevsky Circle were Fyodor Dostoevsky, Mikhail Saltykov-Schedrin, Apollon Maykov and Nikolay Speshnev.

In late 1848, Petrashevsky took part in meetings, initiated by Speshnev, that were aimed at creating a secret society. Petrashevsky, however, argued for judicial reform rather than violent methods, and did not participate in the activities of Speshnev's society.

=== Mock execution and exile ===
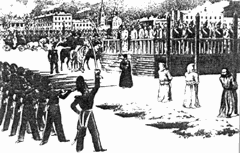
Mock execution of Petrashevtsy. Petrashevsky is the man tied to the right-hand pole, without a hood

In 1849, Mikhail Petrashevsky was arrested and sentenced to death. Together with the other Petrashevtsy he was taken to the parade ground of the Semionovsky Regiment in Saint Petersburg, the usual place for public executions, and tied to the pole. At the last moment, the execution was stopped, and it was revealed that his sentence had been commuted to katorga for an unspecified term. He was sent to Eastern Siberia to serve his sentence.

In 1856, Petrashevsky's status was changed to that of an exile settler. He lived in Irkutsk, where he founded a newspaper, Amur, in 1860.

=== Later life and death ===
In February 1860, Petrashevsky was banished to the Minusinsk district for speaking out against the abuse of power by local officials. He died there six years later.

== Political work ==
Petrashevsky considered himself a follower of Charles Fourier and spoke for democratisation of the Russian political system and liberation of the peasantry with their lands. He advocated long preparatory work among the masses for revolutionary struggle.

As most members of the Russian intelligentsia, their commitment to 'the people' was abstract; being unsure of individual men but loving mankind. Petrashevsky summed this up by proclaiming: 'unable to find anything in either women or men worthy of my adherence, I have turned to devote myself to the service of humanity'.

== Bibliography ==
- Evans, John L. (1974). The Petraševskij Circle 1845-1849. The Hague: Mouton.
- Figes, Orlando (2014). A People's Tragedy: The Russian Revolution 1891–1924. London: The Bodley Head. ISBN 9781847922915.
