= Mock execution =

Form of psychological torture

A mock execution is a stratagem in which a victim is deliberately but falsely made to feel that their execution or that of another person is imminent or is taking place. This might involve blindfolding the victim, telling them they are about to die, or holding an unloaded gun to their head and pulling the trigger. Mock execution is categorized as psychological torture. There is a sense of fear induced when a person is made to feel that they are about to be executed or witness someone being executed. The psychological trauma can lead to depression, anxiety, post-traumatic stress disorder, memory loss, and other mental disorders.

== Historical use ==
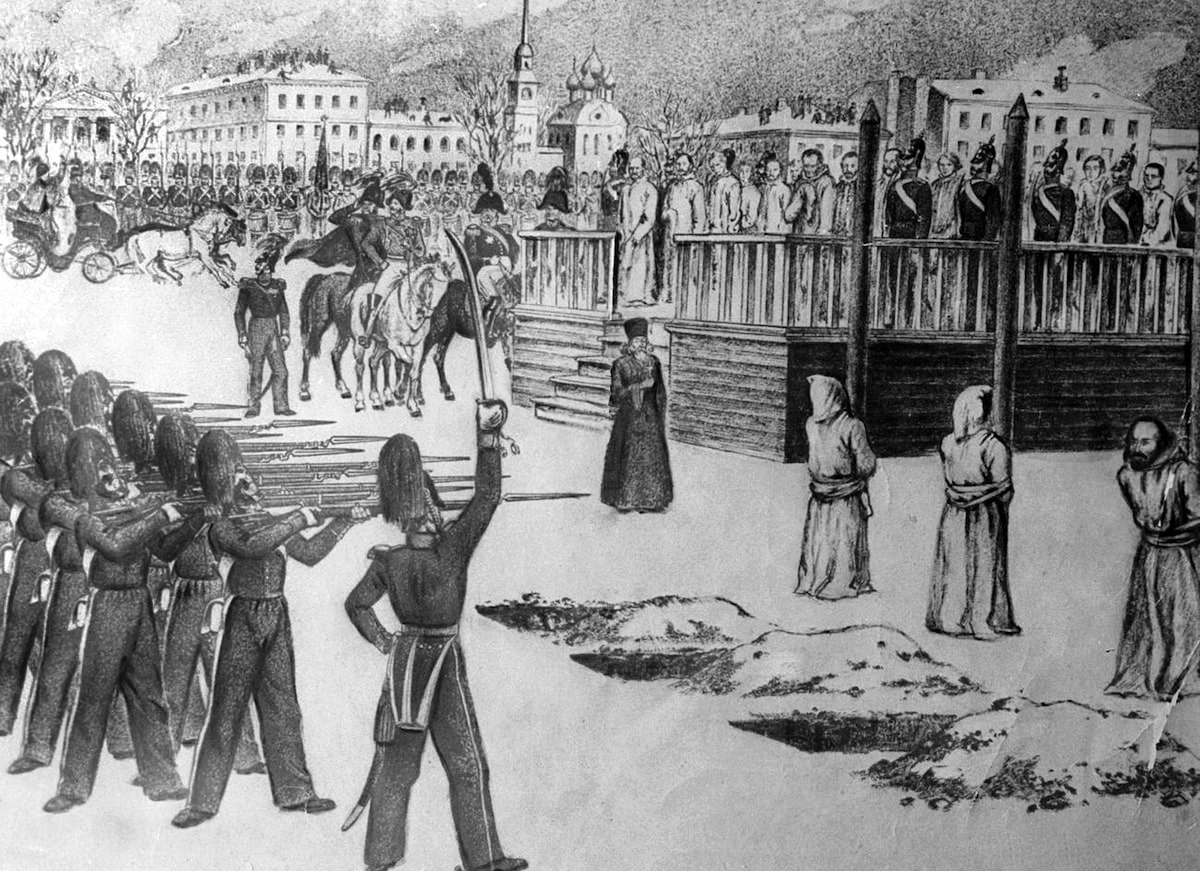
Petrashevsky Circle's members, including writer Fyodor Dostoevsky, going through an 'execution ritual', an example of a mock execution. St. Petersburg, Semionov-Plaz, 1849. B. Pokrovsky's drawing

=== During the rule of Nicholas I of Russia ===
In 1849, members of Russian political discussion group the Petrashevsky Circle, including writer Fyodor Dostoevsky, were convicted for high treason and sentenced to execution by firing squad. The sentences were commuted to hard labour secretly and the prisoners were told only after all the preparations for execution had been carried out. Dostoevsky described the experience in his novel The Idiot.

=== USS Pueblo incident ===
In 1968, Commander Lloyd M. Bucher, captain of the USS Pueblo, was tortured and put through a mock firing squad by North Korean interrogators in an effort to make him confess.

=== Iran hostage crisis ===
The American hostages held by Iran in 1979 were subjected to a mock execution by their detainers.

== Contemporary use ==
=== By the West Side Boys ===
In 2000, six Royal Irish Rangers were held hostage in Sierra Leone and subjected to mock executions by the West Side Boys to get information from them.

=== By the United States ===
Reports of mock executions carried out by the US Marines on detainees in Iraq surfaced in December 2004, as the American Civil Liberties Union published internal documents of the Naval Criminal Investigative Service (NCIS) obtained through the Freedom of Information Act. The documents were written seven weeks after the publication of the photographs which triggered the Abu Ghraib prisoner abuse scandal.

In April 2003, U.S. Army Lieutenant Colonel Allen West had Iraqi police officer Yehiya Kadoori Hamoodi seized and brought in for questioning based on allegations he was planning an imminent attack on West's unit. After Hamoodi was allegedly beaten by an interpreter and several U.S. troops, West took Hamoodi out of the interrogation room and showed him six U.S. troops with weapons in hand. West told Hamoodi, "If you don't talk, they will kill you." West then placed Hamoodi's head in a sand-filled barrel used for clearing weapons, placed his gun into the barrel and discharged the weapon near Hamoodi's head. Hamoodi then provided West with names, location and methods of the alleged ambush, which never happened, and no evidence of any plans of attack was found. Hamoodi was released without charges; West was charged with violations of two statutes of the Uniform Code of Military Justice, but charges were dropped after West was fined $5,000 for the incident and allowed to resign his position with the U.S. Army without court martial.

=== By the Islamic State ===
In 2014, journalist James Foley was subjected to mock executions by ISIS militants before he was beheaded. Mock executions are reported to be a common torture tactic used by ISIS.

== See also ==
- Death row phenomenon: the psychological trauma that is experienced by death row inmates
- Psychological torture
