= Catechism of a Revolutionary =

1869 manifesto by Sergey Nechayev

- Created: 1869
- Author: Sergey Nechayev

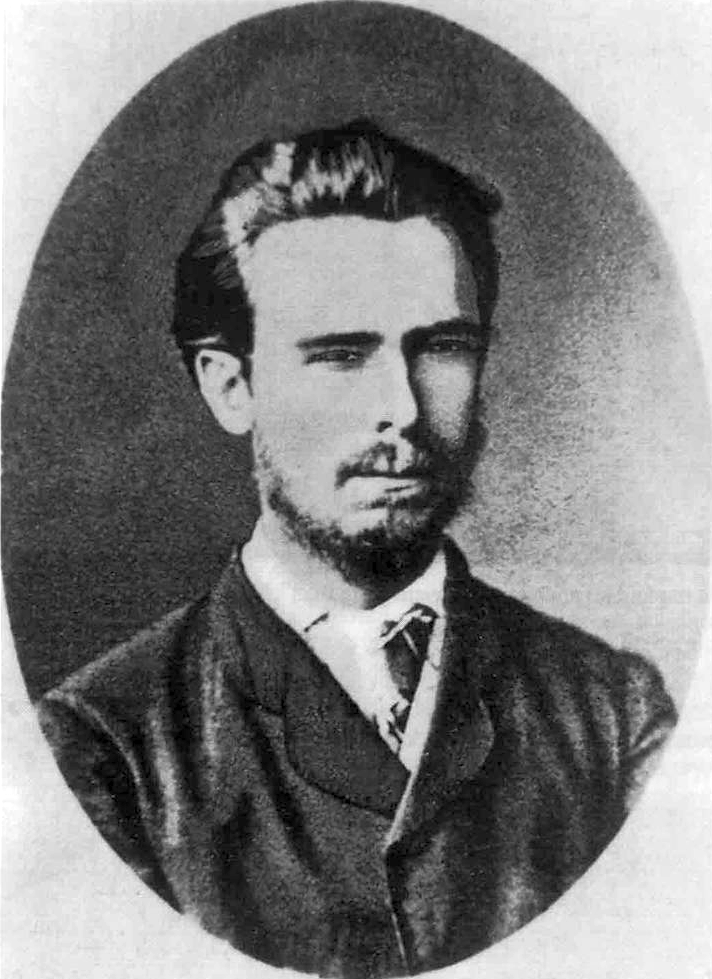
Narodnik and nihilist revolutionary Sergey Nechayev (1847–1882)

The Catechism of a Revolutionary (Russian: Катехизис революционера) is a manifesto written by Russian revolutionary Sergey Nechayev between April and August 1869.

== Background ==
The manifesto is a manual for the formation of secret societies.

It is debated how much input Mikhail Bakunin had or if it is solely the work of Nechayev. The work called for total devotion to a revolutionary lifestyle. Its publication in the Government Herald in July 1871 as the manifesto of the Narodnaya Rasprava secret society ("Общество народной расправы") was one of the most dramatic events of Nechayev's revolutionary life, through its words and the actions it inspired establishing Nechayev's importance for the Nihilist movement.

== Content ==
The Catechism is divided into two sections; General Rules of the Organisation and Rules of Conduct of Revolutionaries, 22 and 26 paragraphs long respectively; abridged versions were published as excerpts in the anarchist periodicals Freiheit and The Alarm.

The most radical document of its age, the Catechism outlined the authors' revolutionary Jacobin program of organisation and discipline, a program that became the backbone of the radical movement in Russia. The revolutionary is portrayed in the Catechism as an amoral avenging angel, an expendable resource in the service of the revolution, committed to any crime or treachery necessary to effect the downfall of the prevailing order.

The revolutionary is a doomed man. He has no private interests, no affairs, sentiments, ties, property nor even a name of his own. His entire being is devoured by one purpose, one thought, one passion – the revolution. Heart and soul, not merely by word but by deed, he has severed every link with the social order and with the entire civilized world; with the laws, good manners, conventions, and morality of that world. He is its merciless enemy and continues to inhabit it with only one purpose – to destroy it.

— Catechism of a Revolutionary, opening lines

== Reception ==
Prominent Black Panther of the 20th century Eldridge Cleaver adopted the Catechism as a "revolutionary bible", incorporating it into his daily life to the extent that he employed, in his words, "tactics of ruthlessness in my dealings with everyone with whom I came into contact". The ideas and sentiments in the work had been in part previously aired by Pyotr Zaichnevsky and Nikolai Ishutin in Russia, and by Carbonari and Young Italy in the West.

The journal Cahiers du monde russe et soviétique published a letter from Bakunin to Nechayev, in which Bakunin wrote, "You remember how you were angry with me, when I called you abrek and called your Catechism the Catechism of abreks?"

== See also ==
- Russian nihilist movement
- Barracks communism
- Professional revolutionaries
- Demons, an 1872 novel by Fyodor Dostoevsky influenced by the events surrounding the publication of the Catechism.
