= Dmitry Karakozov =

Russian revolutionary who attempted to assassinate Tsar Alexander II, in 1866

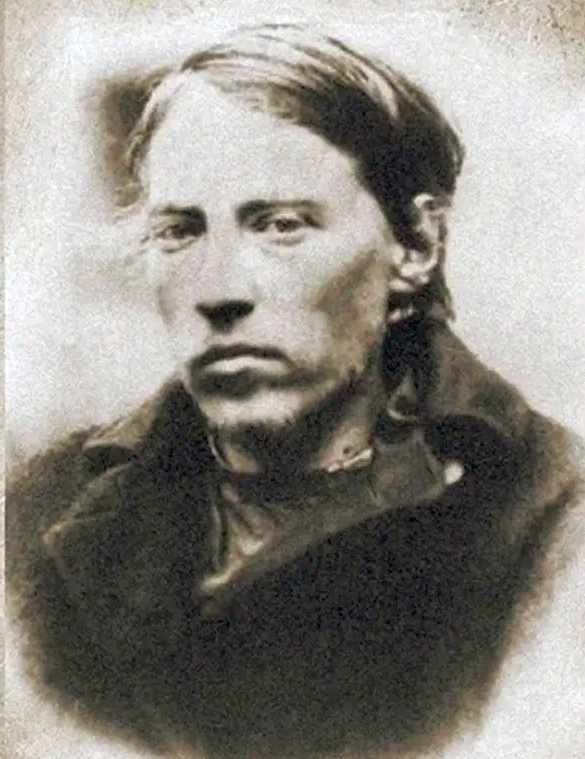
- Born: 4 November [O.S. 23 October] 1840; Kostroma, Russian Empire
- Died: 15 September [O.S. 3 September] 1866 (aged 25); St. Petersburg, Russian Empire
- Cause of death: Execution by hanging
- Movement: Russian nihilist movement

Dmitry Vladimirovich Karakozov (Russian: Дми́трий Влади́мирович Карако́зов); (4 November [O.S. 23 October] 1840 – 15 September [O.S. 3 September] 1866) was a Russian political activist and the first revolutionary in the Russian Empire to make an attempt on the life of a tsar. His attempt to assassinate Tsar Alexander II failed and Karakozov was executed.

== Early life and studies ==
Upon graduating from Penza Gymnasium in 1860 studied law at Kazan University, then at Moscow University.

In early 1866 he became a member of the "revolutionary wing" of the Ishutin Circle, founded by his cousin Nikolai Ishutin in Moscow in 1863.

== Attempted assassination of Alexander II ==
In the spring of 1866, Karakozov arrived in St Petersburg to assassinate Alexander II. He circulated his hand-written proclamation called "Друзьям-рабочим" ("To Friends-Workers"), in which he incited people to revolt. He wrote a manifesto to the St Petersburg governor blaming the Tsar for the suffering of the poor: "I have decided to destroy the evil Tsar, and to die for my beloved people." This note never reached anyone; it was lost in the mail.

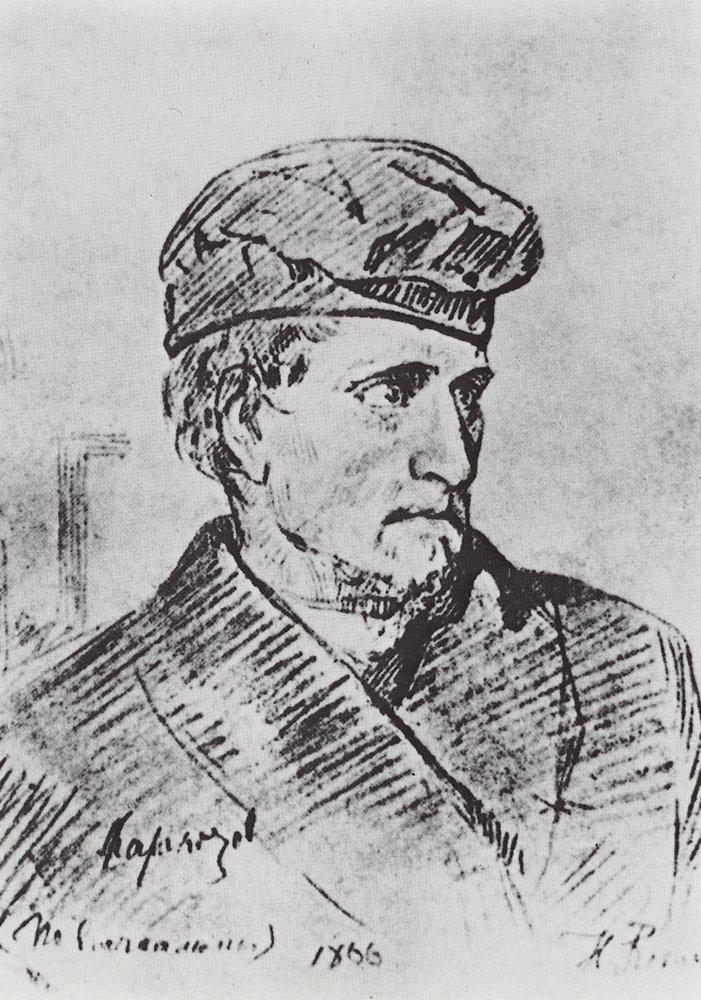
Portrait of Karakozov by Ilya Repin (1866)

It is possible 1866 was the year chosen because of the character of Rakhmetov in What Is to Be Done?. This fictional inspiration of revolutionary youth plans for a revolution to coincide with the apocalypse according to Newton-1866.

I have long been tormented by the thought and given no rest by my doubts why my beloved simple Russian people has to suffer so much! ... Why next to the eternal simple peasant and labourer in his factory and workshop are there people who do nothing – idle nobles, a horde of officials and other wealthy people, all living in shining houses? I have looked for the reason for all this in books, and I have found it. The man really responsible is the Tsar. ... the Tsar is the first of the nobles. He never holds out his hand to the people because he is himself the people's worst enemy.

— Karakozov, manifesto addressed to "Friends-Workers" (found in Karakozov's pocket)

On 4 April 1866 [N.S. 16 April], Dmitry Karakozov made an unsuccessful attempt on the life of Tsar Alexander II at the gates of the Summer Garden in St Petersburg. As the Tsar was leaving, Dmitry rushed forward to fire. The attempt was thwarted by Ossip Komissarov, a peasant-born hatter's apprentice, who jostled Karakozov's elbow just before the shot was fired. Contemporary monarchists argued that Komissarov's action proved the people's love for their tsar, while contemporary radicals and later Soviet historians argued that Komissarov's involvement in the event was either an accident or an outright government fabrication. Komissarov was ennobled and given a generous allowance, but proved to be an embarrassment to the government due to his boorishness and incoherence and had to be politely removed to the countryside.

Karakozov tried to flee instead of using the second cartridge in his double-barrelled gun, but was easily caught by the guards. He kept one hand in his jacket. It was revealed later to be holding morphine and strychnine to kill himself and prussic acid to disfigure his face. Alexander asked him "What do you want?" "Nothing, nothing," he replied.

Karakozov was taken to the Peter and Paul Fortress. He begged for forgiveness and confessed to a priest. The Supreme Criminal Court sentenced him to death by hanging and he was executed in St. Petersburg on 3 September 1866 [N.S. 15 September]. Of the twenty-six others who were accused of being his accomplices, Ishutin was sentenced to death (this was later commuted as he was about to executed), seven received hard labor, eleven went to prison, and seven were acquitted. As a result of the assassination attempt, the Tsar punished St Petersburg University. Students could no longer form any kind of organisation, no matter how harmless (Ishutin's organisation had officially been to set up sewing cooperatives). They were subjected to constant surveillance and periodic searches.

Karakozov was an inspiration for the radical nihilists Sergei Nechaev and Vera Zasulich. Alexander II was assassinated in 1881.

== Notes ==
- See, e.g., Adam Bruno Ulam. Prophets and Conspirators in Pre-Revolutionary Russia, New Brunswick, NJ, Transaction Publishers, 1998 (first edition 1977) ISBN 0-7658-0443-3 pp. 3–5.
- For an analysis of the public perception of the assassination attempt and Komissarov's actions, see Richard S. Wortman. Scenarios of Power: Myth and Ceremony in Russian Monarchy: Volume Two: From Alexander II to the Abdication of Nicholas II, Princeton University Press, 2004; ISBN 0-691-02947-4, pp. 110–13
