= Ishutin =

Ishutin (Russian: Ишутин) is a Russian masculine surname; its feminine counterpart is Ishutina. Notable people with the surname include:

- Danil Ishutin (born 1989), Ukrainian computer game player
- Nikolai Ishutin (1840–1879), one of the first Russian utopian socialists
