= Znamensky District, Oryol Oblast =

Znamensky District Знаменский район (Russian)
- District
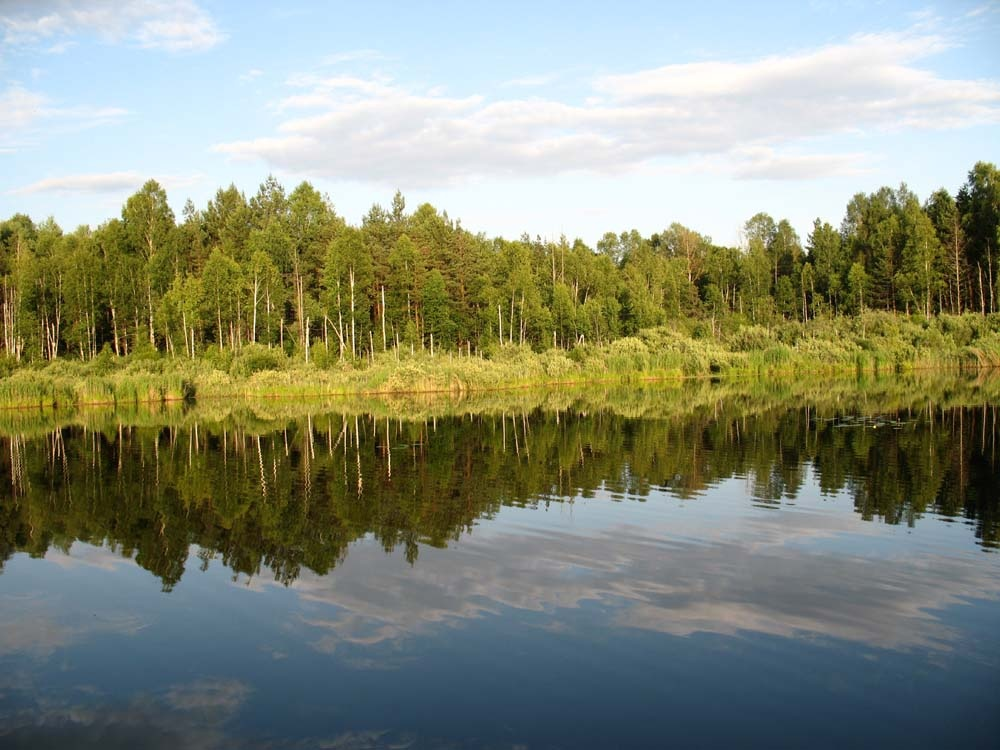
- Orlovskoye Polesye National Park, Znamensky District

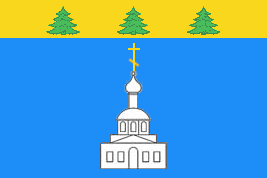
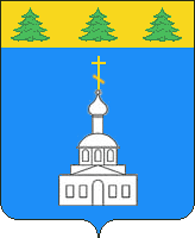
- Flag Coat of arms
- Location of Znamensky District in Oryol Oblast
- Coordinates: 53°17′N 35°41′E
- Country: Russia
- Federal subject: Oryol Oblast
- Established: 5 August 1929
- Administrative center: Znamenskoye

Area
  - Total: 817.1 km^{2} (315.5 sq mi)

Population (2010 Census)
  - Total: 5,016
  - Density: 6.139/km^{2} (15.90/sq mi)
  - Urban: 0%
  - Rural: 100%

Administrative structure
  - Administrative divisions: 7 selsoviet
  - Inhabited localities: 94 rural localities

Municipal structure
  - Municipally incorporated as: Znamensky Municipal District
  - Municipal divisions: 0 urban settlements, 7 rural settlements
- Time zone: UTC+3 (MSK)
- OKTMO ID: 54620000
- Website: http://admznamen.ru/

Znamensky District (Russian: Зна́менский райо́н) is an administrative and municipal district (raion), one of the twenty-four in Oryol Oblast, Russia. It is located in the northwest of the oblast. The area of the district is 817.1 square kilometers (315.5 sq mi). Its administrative center is the rural locality (a selo) of Znamenskoye. Population: 5,016 (2010 Census); 6,458 (2002 census); 6,510 (1989 Soviet census). The population of Znamenskoye accounts for 33.9% of the district's total population.

== Geography ==
The main rivers in the district are the Nugr' and the Vytebet, a tributary of the Zhizdra. The district's average elevation above sea level is 216 meters (709 ft), with a high point of 255 meters (837 ft) and a low point of 176 meters (577 ft).

The Orlovskoye Polesye national park is partly located in the district.

== Notable people ==
People's Artist of the USSR Ivan Pereverzev (1914–1978) was born on the territory of modern district, in the now defunct village of Kuzminki.
