= Maxim Antonovich =

Russian literary critic, memoirist, essayist, translator and philosopher

- Максим Антонович
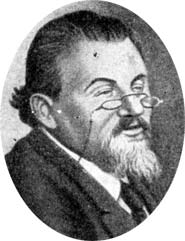
- Born: 9 May 1835; Belopolye, Sumskoy Uyezd, Kharkov Governorate, Russian Empire/Ukraine
- Died: 14 November 1918 (aged 83); Petrograd, Soviet Russia
- Occupations: literary critic, essayist, philosopher, memoirist
- Years active: 1860–1916
- Movement: Russian nihilist movement

Maxim Alexeyevich Antonovich (Russian: Макси́м Алексе́евич Антоно́вич; 9 May 1835, – 14 November 1918) was a Russian literary critic, essayist, memoirist, translator and philosopher.

== Biography ==
Maxim Antonovich was born in Belopolye, Sumskoy Uyezd, Kharkov Governorate, to the family of a clergyman. After studying at the Kharkiv seminary he enrolled in the Saint Petersburg Theological Academy which he graduated in 1859.

Antonovich's literary career started in Sovremennik where several articles promoting the philosophy of materialism brought him the reputation of an "ideological heir to Chernyshevsky." As a head of the magazine's literary criticism department (a position he took after Nikolai Dobrolyubov's death) Antonovich waged bitter feuds against Vremya, Epokha, and later Russkoye Slovo, after his vicious criticism of Ivan Turgenev's Fathers and Sons in 1862 outraged Dmitry Pisarev and a violent confrontation ensued which Fyodor Dostoyevsky called "the break-up of the Russian nihilism."

After Nekrasov refused him an invitation to the renewed Otechestvennye Zapiski in 1869, Antonovich accused the former of "betrayal of the old friends" and turned to translation work (Histoire de la Revolution Française by Louis Blanc, Physics by Balfour Stewart, The Teaching of Geography by Archibald Geikie, Textbook of Physiology by Michael Foster, among others). In 1898–1916 he published memoirs on Nikolai Dobrolyubov, Nikolai Chernyshevsky, Nikolai Nekrasov and Pyotr Lavrov. Antonovich died on 14 November 1918 in Petrograd, Soviet Russia.
