= Kuzminki =

Kuzminki may refer to:

- Kuzminki District, a district of Moscow
- Kuzminki (Moscow Metro), a station of the Moscow Metro
- Kuzminki (rural locality), name of several rural localities in Russia
- Vlakhernskoye-Kuzminki, a former Stroganov and Golitsyn estate in Moscow
