= Dmitry Pisarev =

Russian writer and nihilist philosopher (1840–1868)

- Дмитрий Писарев
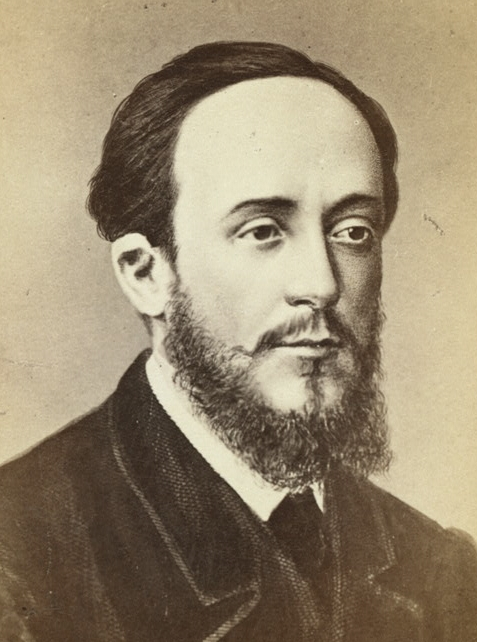
- Pisarev c. 1880–1886
- Born: October 14, 1840; Znamenskoye, Oryol Governorate, Russian Empire
- Died: July 16, 1868 (aged 27); Dubulti, Russian Empire
- Cause of death: Drowning (possibly as suicide)
- Resting place: Literatorskie mostki, Volkovo Cemetery, Saint Petersburg
- Education: Saint Petersburg Imperial University
- Occupations: Literary critic, social critic, essayist, journalist
- Years active: 1858–1868
- Known for: Promoting natural science, Bazarovism, proto-Nietzscheanism

Philosophical work
- Era: 19th-century philosophy
- Region: Russian philosophy
- School: Russian nihilism
- Notable ideas: New types; Rational egoism; Thinking proletariat

Dmitry Ivanovich Pisarev (Note: Russian: Дми́трий Ива́нович Пи́сарев) (14 October [O.S. 2 October] 1840 – 16 July [O.S. 4 July] 1868) was a Russian literary critic and philosopher who was a central figure of Russian nihilism. He is noted as a forerunner of Nietzschean philosophy, and for the impact his advocacy of liberation movements and natural science had on Russian history.

A critique of his philosophy became the subject of Fyodor Dostoevsky's celebrated novel Crime and Punishment. Indeed, Pisarev's philosophy embraces the nihilist aims of negation and value-destruction; in freeing oneself from all human and moral authority, the nihilist becomes ennobled above the common masses and free to act according to sheer personal preference and usefulness. These new types, as Pisarev termed them, were to be pioneers of what he saw as the most necessary step for human development, namely the reset and destruction of the existing mode of thought. Among his most famous locutions is: "What can be smashed must be smashed. Whatever withstands the blow is fit to survive; what flies into pieces is rubbish. In any case, strike out right and left, no harm can come of it."

Pisarev wrote most of his works while imprisoned. He was arrested for political crimes the year after graduating university and drowned only two years after his release, aged 27. It is unknown whether his death was accidental or suicide as he had also suffered severe mental health issues throughout his life. His works had a deep influence throughout Russia on revolutionaries such as Lenin, anti-nihilists such as Dostoevsky, and scientists such as the Nobel Prize winner Ivan Pavlov.

== Biography ==
Dmitry Pisarev was born in Znamenskoye in the west of the Russian Empire, into a family of the landed aristocracy. He graduated from a gymnasium in Saint Petersburg in 1856, and in the same year began studying history and philology at Saint Petersburg Imperial University. He began writing as a literary critic for a women's liberal journal called Rassavet in 1858 while he was still a student. From 1859 to 1860 he suffered a severe mental breakdown and attempted suicide at least twice. He was committed to a mental asylum for four months after which he resumed his work and studies. As a critic, he came into contact with the writings of radicals such as Nikolay Dobrolyubov and Nikolay Chernyshevsky, as well as their mentors and followers. He became enthralled with this modern wave of literature, stating that it "forced me out of my confined cell into the fresh air." He graduated in 1861, the same year as serfdom was abolished and the first major student demonstrations were held in Saint Petersburg, by which time he had thoroughly adopted the nihilist outlook and abandoned his Orthodox Christian faith.

After graduation he worked as editor for various publications. He was arrested in 1862 for anti-government writings and was imprisoned until 1866. After his release, he continued his literary work.

During the summer holidays of 1868 he died as a result of a drowning accident at Dubulti on the Gulf of Riga (in present-day Latvia).

== Legacy ==
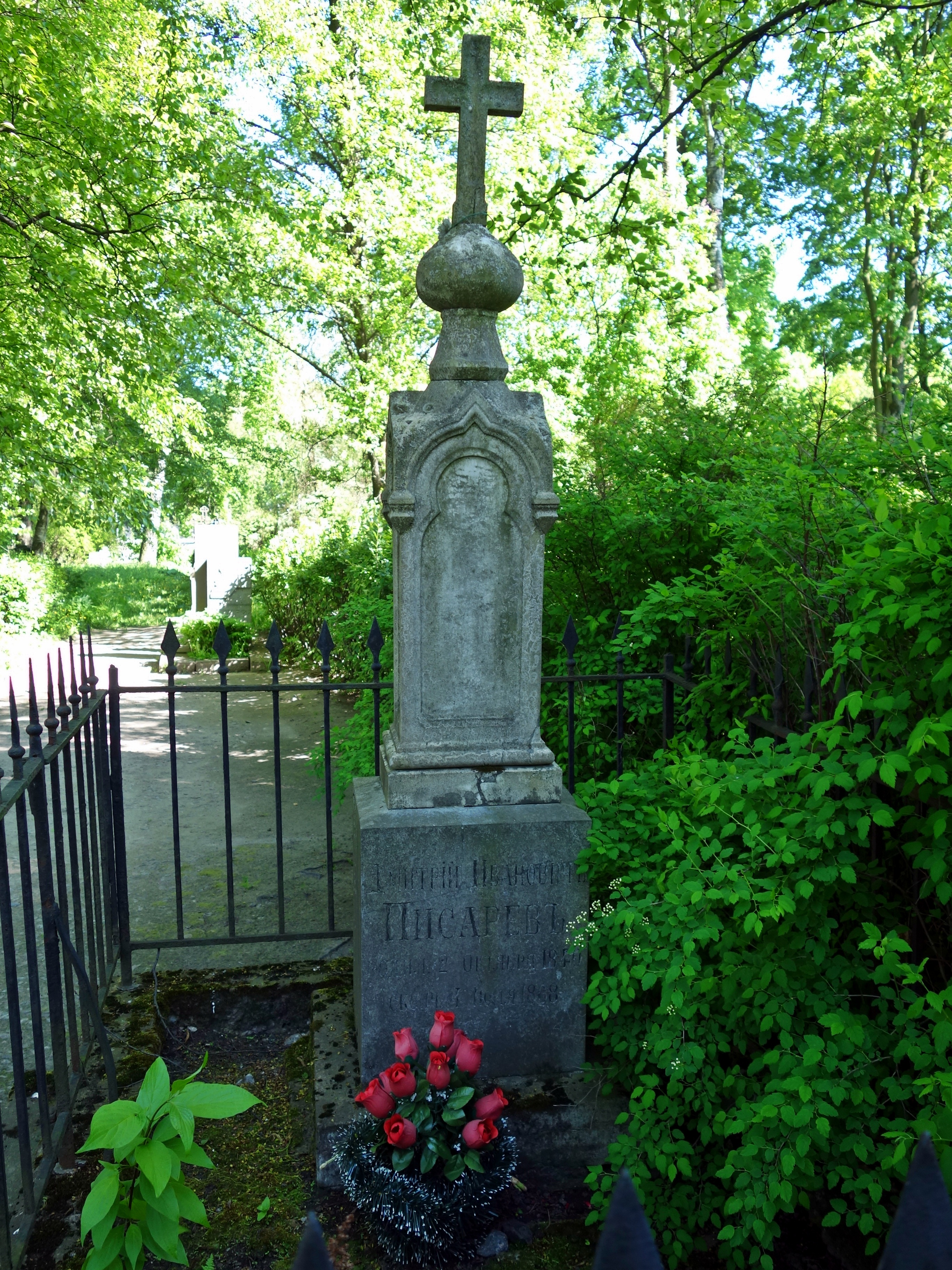
Burial place of Dmitry Pisarev in Volkovo Cemetery in 2017

Pisarev was one of the writers who propelled the democratic-revolutionary trend in Russia during the 1860s. The next generation of Russians, made famous by the events of 1905 and 1917, acknowledged Pisarev's influence. Nadezhda Krupskaya, Lenin's wife, once wrote, "Lenin was of the generation that grew up under the influence of Pisarev".

Pisarev was also noted for his support of Russian natural science, particularly biology, and his works greatly influenced the career choice of the young Ivan Pavlov. He considered himself a positivist, although his incorporation of imagination and style somewhat contradicted that school of thought. He did not believe in romantic ideas because they reminded him of the oppressive tsarist government under which he lived. His basic beliefs were "an extreme anti-aesthetic scientistic position." He focused his efforts on defining the relation between literature and the environment.

Pisarev wanted, more than anything else, for his readers to learn to think independently. This desire he pursued through philosophy, literary criticism and social and family analyses.

=== Influence on Lenin ===
Lenin, in the fifth chapter of What Is To Be Done?, quoted these lines from an article by Pisarev:

"There are rifts and rifts," wrote Pisarev of the rift between dreams and reality. "My dream may run ahead of the natural march of events or may fly off at a tangent in a direction in which no natural march of events will ever proceed. In the first case my dream will not cause any harm; it may even support and augment the energy of the working men.... There is nothing in such dreams that would distort or paralyse labour-power. On the contrary, if man were completely deprived of the ability to dream in this way, if he could not from time to time run ahead and mentally conceive, in an entire and completed picture, the product to which his hands are only just beginning to lend shape, then I cannot at all imagine what stimulus there would be to induce man to undertake and complete extensive and strenuous work in the sphere of art, science, and practical endeavour....

The rift between dreams and reality causes no harm if only the person dreaming believes seriously in his dream, if he attentively observes life, compares his observations with his castles in the air, and if, generally speaking, he works conscientiously for the achievement of his fantasies. If there is some connection between dreams and life then all is well."

Of this kind of dreaming there is unfortunately too little in our movement. And the people most responsible for this are those who boast of their sober views, their "closeness" to the "concrete", the representatives of legal criticism and of illegal "tail-ism".

== Works ==
=== Translated works in English ===
- — (n.d.). "Flowers of Harmless Humour". In Wiener, Leo (ed.). Anthology of Russian Literature from the Earliest Period to the Present Time. Vol. 2. G. P. Putnam's Sons (published 1903).
- — (n.d.). Selected Philosophical, Social And Political Essays. Moscow: Foreign Languages Publishing House (published 1958).

== Sources ==
- Edie, James M.; Scanlan, James; Zeldin, Mary-Barbara (1994). Russian Philosophy Volume II: the Nihilists, The Populists, Critics of Religion and Culture. University of Tennessee Press.
- Frank, Joseph (1995). Dostoevsky: The Miraculous Years, 1865–1871. Princeton University Press. ISBN 0-691-01587-2.
- Granville, Johanna (2004). "Pisarev, Dmitry Ivanovich". In Millar, James R. (ed.). Encyclopedia of Russian history. New York: Macmillan Reference USA.
- Petrov, Kristian (2019). "'Strike out, right and left!': a conceptual-historical analysis of 1860s Russian nihilism and its notion of negation". Stud East Eur Thought. 71 (2): 73–97. doi:10.1007/s11212-019-09319-4.
