= Russian nihilist movement =

1860–1917 Russian movement advocating negation and liberation

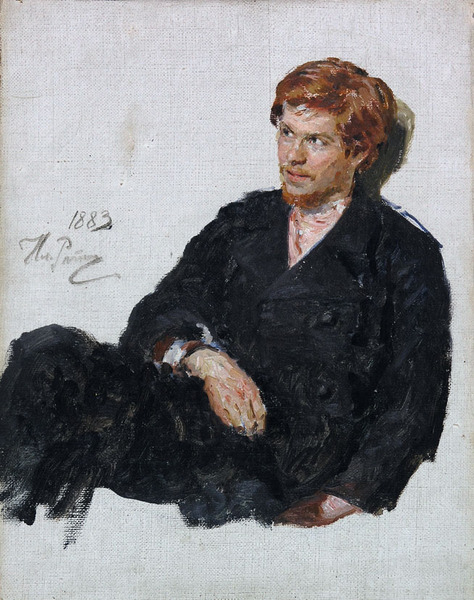
Portrait of a nihilist student by Ilya Repin

The Russian nihilist movement (Note: Occasionally, nihilism will be capitalized when referring to the Russian movement though this is not ubiquitous nor does it correspond with Russian usage.) was a philosophical, cultural, and revolutionary movement in the Russian Empire during the late 19th and early 20th centuries, from which the broader philosophy of nihilism originated. In Russian, the word nigilizm (Russian: нигилизм; meaning 'nihilism', from Latin nihil 'nothing') came to represent the movement's unremitting attacks on morality, religion, and traditional society. Even as it was yet unnamed, the movement arose from a generation of young radicals disillusioned with the social reformers of the past, and from a growing divide between the old aristocratic intellectuals and the new radical intelligentsia.

Russian anarchist Peter Kropotkin, as stated in the Encyclopædia Britannica, "defined nihilism as the symbol of struggle against all forms of tyranny, hypocrisy, and artificiality and for individual freedom." As only an early form of nihilist philosophy, Russian nihilism saw all the morality, philosophy, religion, aesthetics, and social institutions which were in place as worthless and meaningless but did not necessarily see meaninglessness in all ethics, knowledge, and human life. It did however, incorporate theories of hard determinism, atheism, materialism, positivism, and egoism in an aim to assimilate and distinctively recontextualize core elements of the Age of Enlightenment into Russia while dropping the Westernizer approach of the previous generation. Russian nihilism developed an atmosphere of extreme moral scepticism, at times praising outright selfishness and championing those who held themselves exempt from all moral authority. In its most complete forms it also denied the possibility of common ideals, instead favouring a relativist and individualistic outlook. Nihilists predictably fell into conflict with the Russian Orthodox religious authorities, as well as with prevailing family structures and the Tsarist autocracy.

Although most commonly associated with revolutionary activism, most nihilists were in fact not political and instead discarded politics as an outdated stage of humanity. They held that until a destructive programme had overcome the current conditions no constructive programme could be properly formulated, and although some nihilists did begin to develop communal principles their formulations in this regard remained vague. With the widespread revolutionary arson of 1862, a number of assassinations and attempted assassinations of the 1860s and 70s, and the eventual assassination of Tsar Alexander II in 1881, Russian nihilism was characterized throughout Europe as a doctrine of political terrorism and violent crime. Kropotkin argues that while violence and terrorism were used, this was due to the specific revolutionary context and was not inherent to nihilist philosophy, though historian M. A. Gillespie adds that nihilism was nevertheless at the core of revolutionary thought in Russia throughout the lead-up to the Russian Revolution. Professor T. J. J. Altizer further states that Russian nihilism in fact had its deepest expression in a Bolshevist nihilism of the 20th century.

== Definition ==
Pavel Petrovich pulled his mustache. "Well, and Monsieur Bazarov, what is he?" he asked in a leisurely tone.

"What is Bazarov?" Arkady smiled. "Would you like me to tell you, uncle, what he really is?"

"Please do, nephew."

"He is a nihilist!"

"What?" asked Nikolai Petrovich, while Pavel Petrovich lifted his knife in the air with a small piece of butter on the tip and remained motionless.

"He is a nihilist," repeated Arkady.

"A nihilist," said Nikolai Petrovich. "That comes from the Latin nihil, nothing, as far as I can judge; the word must mean a man who… who recognizes nothing?"

"Say —who respects nothing," interposed Pavel Petrovich and lowered his knife with the butter on it.

"Who regards everything from the critical point of view," said Arkady.

"Isn't that exactly the same thing?" asked Pavel Petrovich.

"No, it's not the same thing. A nihilist is a person who does not bow down to any authority, who does not accept any principle on faith, however much that principle may be revered."

— Ivan Turgenev, Chapter 5 of Fathers and Sons

The term nihilism has been widely misused in the West when discussing the Russian movement, especially in relation to revolutionary activity. Criticizing this misterming by Western commentators, Sergey Stepnyak-Kravchinsky stated that revolutionaries themselves simply identified as socialist revolutionaries, or informally as radicals. However, from outside Russia, the term nihilist was misapplied to the entirety of the country's revolutionary milieu. The Encyclopædia Britannica attributes the probable first use of the term in Russian publication to Nikolai Nadezhdin who, like Vasily Bervi-Flerovsky and Vissarion Belinsky after him, used it synonymously with skepticism. Nadezhdin himself had applied the term to Aleksandr Pushkin. From there, nihilism was interpreted as a revolutionary social menace by the well-known conservative journalist Mikhail Katkov, for its negation of moral principles. The term came into favour when accusations of materialism proved no longer sufficiently derogatory.

The intellectual origins of the nihilist movement can be traced back to 1855 and perhaps earlier, where it was principally a philosophy of moral and epistemological skepticism. However, it was not until 1862 that the term was first popularized when Ivan Turgenev's celebrated novel Fathers and Sons used nihilism to describe the disillusionment of the šestidesjatniki, the generation of the 1860s (Russian: шестидесятники, lit. 'sixties') towards both the traditionalists and the progressive reformists that came before them, the Russian generation of the 1840s, or sorokovniki (Russian: сороковники, lit. 'forties'). (Note: The Russian terms sorokovnik and šestidesjatnik are used for the sake of accuracy in delineating the two generations. The former is often translated as 'man of the forties' and the latter as 'man of the sixties', though the sixties in this sense may include as early as 1855.) This at a time when the terms faced by serfs under the emancipation reform of 1861 were seen as bitterly failing. The nihilist characters of Turgenev's novel take up the name of their own volition, stating that negation is the most necessary thing in the present age and as such they deny everything. Likewise, the movement very soon adopted the name, despite the novel's initial harsh reception among both the conservatives and younger generation, and wherever the term was not embraced it was at least accepted.

The term realist was used by Dmitry Pisarev to describe the nihilist position and was also the name of a literary movement, literary realism, which had flourished in Russia in the wake of Pushkin. Although Pisarev was among those who celebrated the embrace of nihilism, the term realism may have done away with the connotations of subjectivism and nothingness that burdened nihilism while retaining the rejection of metaphysics, sophistry, sentimentality, and aestheticism. In a notably later political climate, Alexander Herzen instead presented nihilism as a product of the sorokovniki that the sestidesjatniki had adopted. Contemporary scholarship has challenged the equating of Russian nihilism with mere skepticism, instead identifying it with the fundamentally Promethean character of the nihilist movement. In fact, the nihilists sought to liberate the Promethean might of the Russian people which they saw embodied in a class of prototypal individuals, or new types in their own words. These individuals were seen by Nikolay Chernyshevsky as rational egoists, by Pisarev and Nikolai Shelgunov as the thinking proletariat, by Pyotr Lavrov as critically thinking personalities, by Nikolay Mikhaylovsky as the intelligentsia, and by others as cultural pioneers. Nihilism has also been attributed to a perennial temperament of the Russian people, long pre-existing the movement itself.

Overlapping with forms of Narodism, the movement has also been defined in political terms. Soviet scholarship, for example, often interchanges the designation revolutionary democrats. However, the role of politics was seen as outdated and irrelevant by most nihilists. Rather, they discarded politics, and those who did hold political views or socialist sympathies remained vague. Russian nihilism has also been defined in subcultural terms, in philosophical terms, and incorrectly as a form of political terrorism.

== Historical context ==
Russian nihilism, as stated in the Routledge Encyclopedia of Philosophy, "is perhaps best regarded as the intellectual pool of the period 1855–1866 out of which later radical movements emerged". During this foundational period, the countercultural aspects of the movement scandalized the country and even minor indiscretions left nihilists imprisoned for lengthy periods or in exile to Siberia, where grittier revolutionary attitudes fermented.

At its core, Russian nihilism inhabited an ever-evolving discourse between the sorokovniki and the šestidesjatniki. While nihilism was not exclusive from them, the sorokovniki were on principle a generation given to idealism. "Their attraction to the airy heights of idealism was partly a result of the stultifying political atmosphere of the autocracy, but was also an unintended consequence of Tsar Nicholas I's attempt to Prussianize Russian society", writes historian M. A. Gillespie. "Their flight from the harsh reality of everyday life into the ideal was prepared on an intellectual level by the theosophy of Freemasonry, which exercised great intellectual force in Russian at the time, especially among those whose intellectual education had been shaped by Böhemian mysticism of the radical orthodox sects, the so-called Old Believers." Despite this, the sorokovniki provided the fertile soil for the šestidesjatniki's ideological advancements, even in their confrontations.

=== Westernizers ===
The Westernizers were the progressive wing of the 1840s and 50s intelligentsia who saw adopting Western European ideas as the necessary way forward for Russia's development. In general Westernizers were advocates of liberal reform, the abolition of serfdom, Western science and technology, and Enlightenment ideals imported particularly from France or Germany. Other preliminary figures of this generation include Ivan Turgenev and Vissarion Belinsky.

=== Raznochintsy ===
The raznochintsy (Russian: разночинцы, lit. 'people of miscellaneous ranks'), which began as an 18th-century legal designation for those of the miscellaneous lower-middle classes, by the 19th century had become a distinct yet ambiguously defined social stratum with a growing presence in the Russian intelligentsia. Put simply, the raznochintsy were "educated commoners". Their backgrounds however, did not include peasants, foreigners, tributary natives, nor urban taxpayers such as merchants, guildsmen, and townsfolk, but instead included lower-end families of clergymen, civil servants, retired military servicemen, and minor officials. While many of the most prominent nihilist thinkers were raised free from the extremes of poverty and hardship — some even having been born into aristocratic families — a connection between the raznochintsy and the new radicals has often been emphasized in comparison to the dominance of aristocratic intellectuals in previous generations.

As early as the 1840s, the raznochintsy gained significant influence over the development of Russian society and culture, the intelligentsia of this class came to be synonymous with the "revolutionary intelligentsia". Vissarion Belinsky and members of the Petrashevsky Circle were among these, being prominent figures of the movement to abolish serfdom. Of the nihilist generation, Nikolay Chernyshevsky, Nikolay Dobrolyubov, and Maxim Antonovich were all sons of unaffluent priests before turning to atheist materialism.

== Russian materialism ==
Russian materialism, which quickly became synonymous with Russian nihilism, developed under the influence of Left Hegelian materialism from Germany and the delayed influence of the French Enlightenment. The origins of this followed from Ludwig Feuerbach as a direct reaction to the German idealism which had found such popularity under the sorokovniki—namely the works of Friedrich Schelling, Georg Hegel and Johann Fichte. However, it was in fact those among the older generation who were first characterized as nihilists, and it was Left Hegelianism that the Schellingians began to define as nihilism.

After severely struggling in the face of censorship — from which much of its core content is left unclear and obscured — the open academic development of Russian materialism would later be suppressed by the state after an attempted assassination of Tsar Alexander II in 1866, and would not see a significant intellectual revival until the late nineteenth century. The Routledge Encyclopedia of Philosophy states:

The only strictly philosophical legacy of the materialists came in the form of their influence on Russian Marxism. Georgii Plekhanov and Vladimir Lenin, the two thinkers most responsible for the development of Marxism in Russia, credited Chernyshevskii with having, respectively, 'massive' and 'overwhelming' influence on them. During the communist period of Russian history, the principal 'nihilist' theoreticians were officially lionized under the designation 'Russian revolutionary democrats' and were called the most important materialist thinkers in the history of philosophy before Marx.

=== Left Hegelians ===
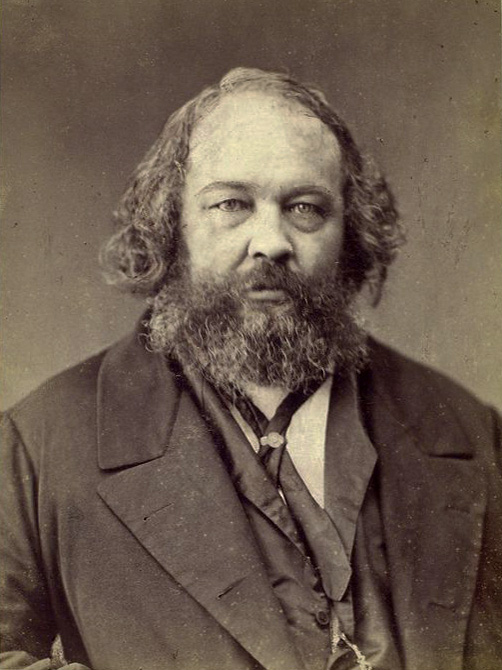
Mikhail Bakunin, often regarded as the father of Russian nihilism

Left Hegelianism in Russia began with those of the Westernizer generation who sought to radicalize Hegelian thought and build upon Ludwig Feuerbach's materialism. Among these were Alexander Herzen and Mikhail Bakunin, both sons of noblemen though Herzen had been born illegitimate. Bakunin became a Hegelian in 1838 and an extreme Left Hegelian shortly after visiting Berlin in 1840. That same year, Herzen began work on his own analysis of Hegel interpreted through August Cieszkowski and Feuerbach.

Both Bakunin and Herzen held concerns about the extremes of materialism. Whereas Bakunin is more strictly considered a Russian materialist, Herzen sought a reconciliation between empiricist materialism and abstract thought. He saw universalism as one of the great achievements of idealism which a crude materialism could threaten. In one of the first serious attempts to give a radical left-wing interpretation of Hegelian dialectics, Bakunin wrote his 1842 article "The Reaction in Germany" and essentially foreshadowed later generations of nihilists with his infamous declaration:

Let us therefore trust the eternal spirit which destroys and annihilates only because it is the unfathomable and eternal source of all life. The passion for destruction is a creative passion too!

Bakunin and Herzen began to meet rejection from others in the Westernizer camp for their open embrace of far-left politics. For Herzen this came with embracing the anarchist socialism of Pierre-Joseph Proudhon, whose ideas he began circulating among Moscow's radical circles in the 1840s. The first roots of Bakunin's own interest in anarchism can also be traced to around this time. Bakunin was also the one to introduce Hegelian thought to Vissarion Belinsky.

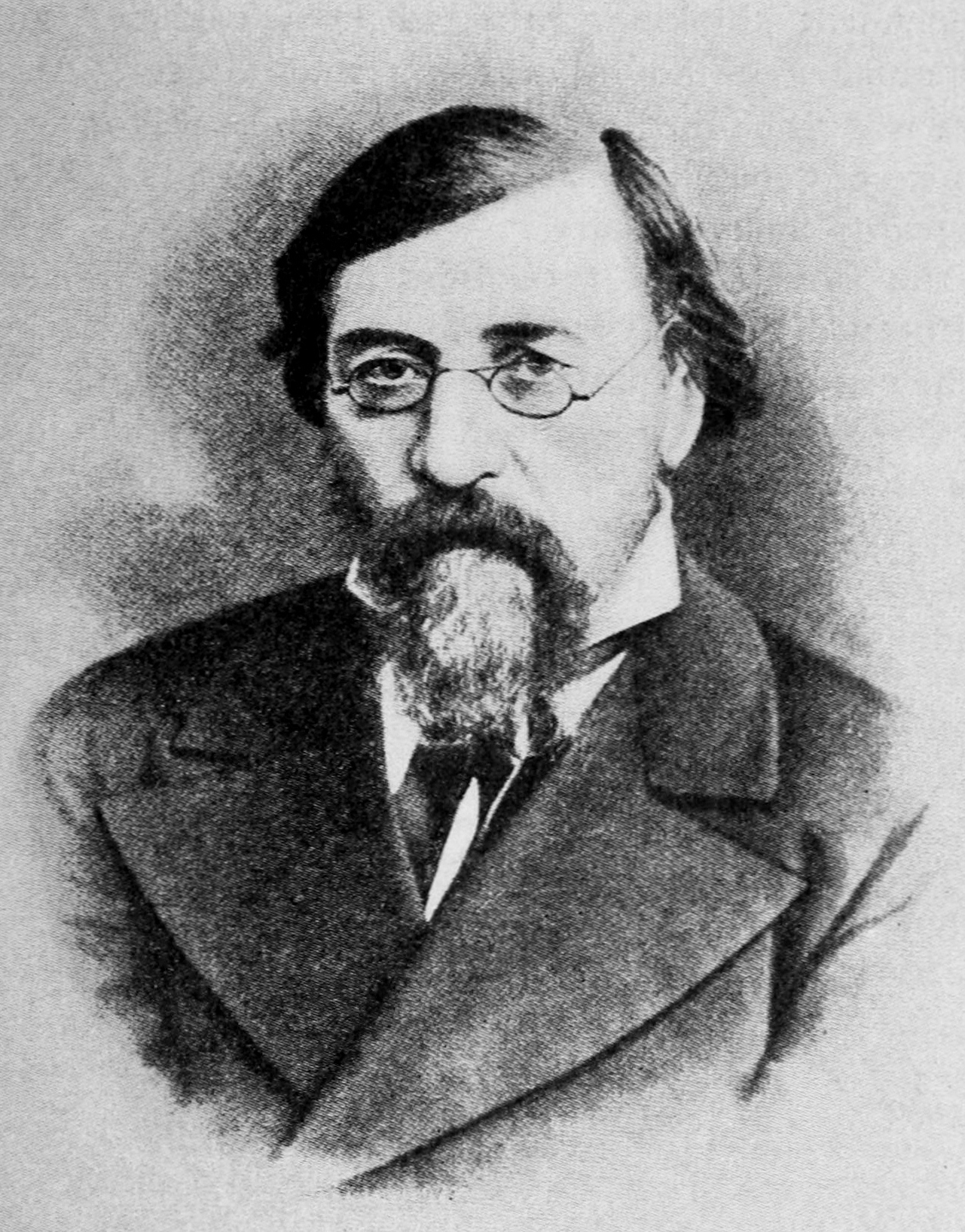
Nikolay Chernyshevsky, utopian socialist, a major intellectual force behind nihilism

Often considered the first of the šestidesjatniki, Nikolay Chernyshevsky became an admirer of Feuerbach, Herzen, and Belinsky towards the end of the 1840s. It was at this time that he drew towards socialist materialism and was in close contact with members of the Petrashevsky Circle.

=== Transition to nihilism ===
It was not until the death of Nicholas I in 1855 and the end of the Crimean War the following year that this Feuerbachian materialist trend developed into a broad philosophical movement. Alexander II's ascent to the throne brought liberal reforms to university entry regulations and loosened control over publication, much to the movement's good fortune. The newly emerging generation continued to draw from the Left Hegelians but thoroughly abandoned Hegel and the German idealists from whom they had drawn their influence. Where those early thinkers such as Bakunin and Herzen had found use of Fichte and Hegel, the younger generation were set on their rejection of idealism and were more ready to abandon politics as well. Historian K. Petrov writes that:

Bakunin and Herzen held nihilistic views and contributed to the nihilists' cause. One should, however, remember that some significant differences remain between the nihilist "fathers" and the nihilist "children". ... Although Herzen could be qualified as a nihilist in several senses, he was by virtue of belonging to an older generation, supposedly prone to philosophical idealism, still regarded as an "other" by some of the canonized nihilists among the 1860s generation.

German materialists Ludwig Büchner, Jacob Moleschott, and Carl Vogt became new favourites. Further influence came from the utilitarian ideas of John Stuart Mill, though his bourgeois liberalism was detested, and later from evolutionary biologists Charles Darwin and Jean-Baptiste Lamarck.

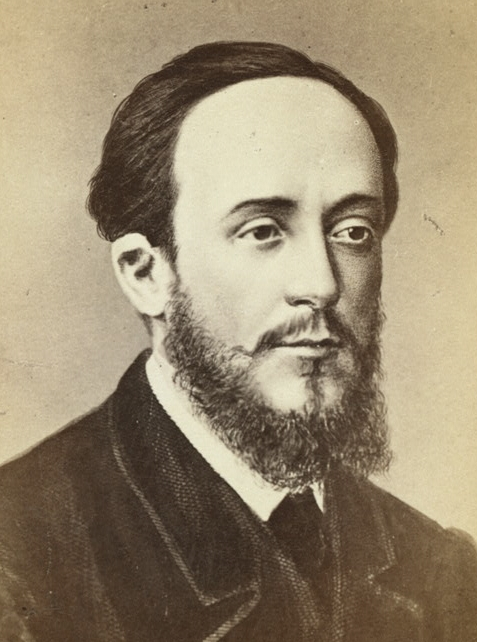
Dmitry Pisarev, nihilist philosopher

In 1855, Chernyshevsky completed his first philosophical work and master's dissertation "The Aesthetic Relation of Art to Reality" — applying Feuerbach's methods to a critique of Hegelian aesthetics. The mid-1850s also saw the emergence of Nikolay Dobrolyubov as a budding university activist and poet. As a fellow šestidesjatnik, he further elaborated the ideas of Russian materialism and is at times seen as a leading nihilist. Dobrolyubov had in fact occasionally used the term nihilism prior to its popularization at the hands of Turgenev, which he had picked up from sociologist and fellow šestidesjatnik Vasily Bervi-Flerovsky, who in turn had used it synonymously with skepticism. Together with Chernyshevsky, of whom he was a disciple and comrade, Dobrolyubov wrote for the literary journal Sovremennik—Chernyshevsky being its principle editor. With their contributions, the journal became the primary organ of revolutionary thought in its time. The two of them, later followed by Maxim Antonovich and Dmitry Pisarev, had taken up the Russian tradition of socially-charged literary criticism which Belinsky had begun. The discoursing of Russian literature allowed them the vehicle to have their ideas published that censorship would not have otherwise granted. Pisarev himself wrote at first for Rassvet and then for Russkoye Slovo—the latter of which came to rival Sovremennik in its influence over the radical movement.

By the late 1850s however, Chernyshevsky had become politically radicalized and began to reject Herzen's social discourse, devoting himself instead to the revolutionary socialist cause. Alongside Chernyshevsky came Ivan Sechenov, who would later be credited as the father of Russian physiology and scientific psychology by Ivan Pavlov. Chernyshenvsky and Sechenov shared the argument that the natural sciences were wholly adequate to study human and animal life according to a deterministic model, and Sechenov lent particular influence to Chernyshevsky in this regard. This more subtle argument was favoured since state censorship made no allowance for outwardly challenging its religious doctrines.

== Bazarovism ==
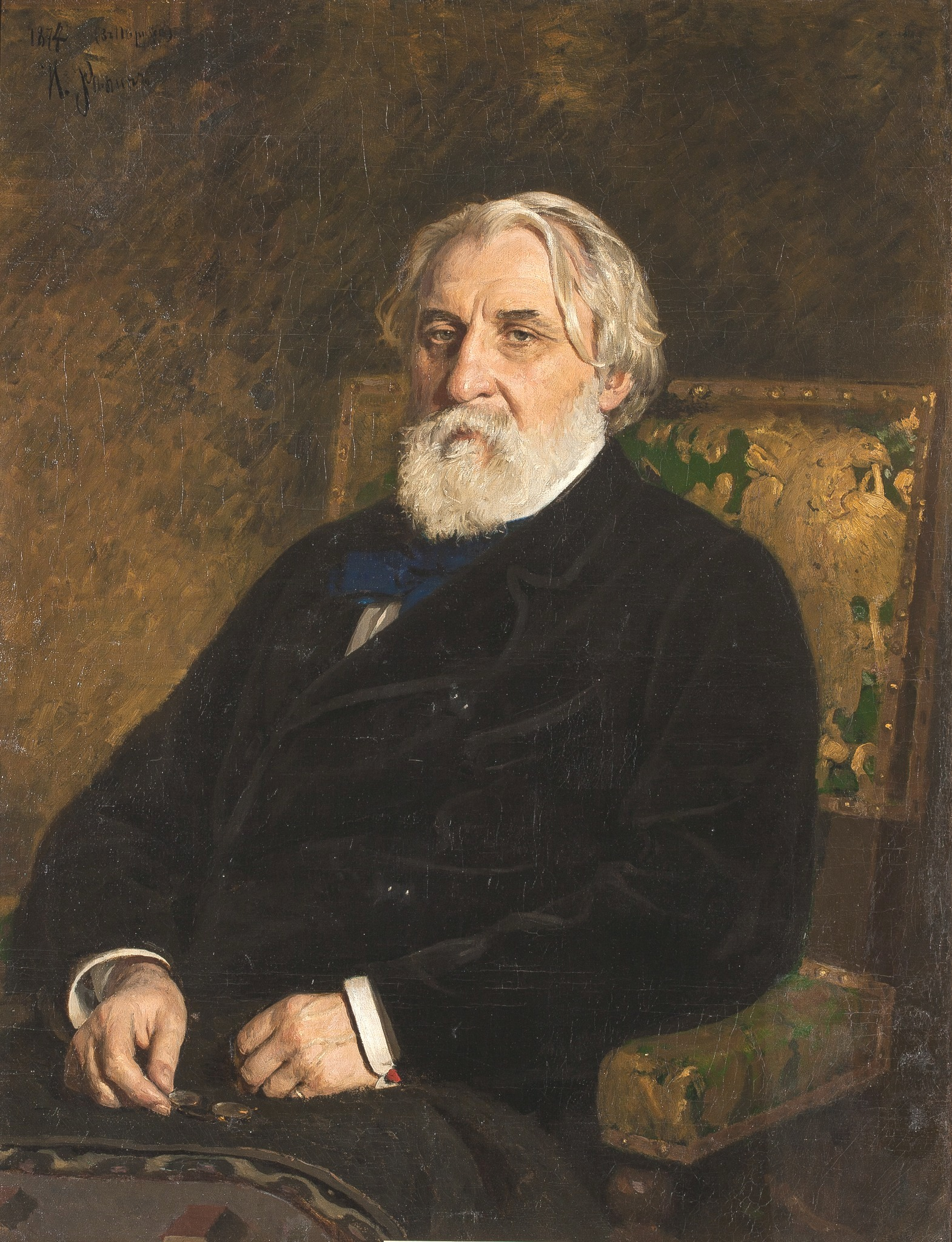
Ilya Repin's portrait of Ivan Turgenev, who popularized the term nihilism with his character Bazarov

Bazarovism, as popularized by Dmitry Pisarev, was the marked embrace of the style and cynicism of the nihilist character Yevgeny Bazarov from Ivan Turgenev's Fathers and Sons, in which the term nihilism was first popularized. Pisarev graduated university in 1861, the same year as serfdom was abolished and the first major student demonstration was held in St. Petersburg. Turgenev himself notes that as early as 1862, the year of the novel's publishing, violent protestors had begun calling themselves nihilists. The surge of student activism became the backdrop for Alexander II's education reforms, under the supervision of education minister Aleksandr Vasilevich Golovnin. These reforms however, while conceding an expansion of the raznochinnaya intelligentsia, refused to grant more rights to students and university admittance remained exclusively male. Historian Kristian Petrov writes:

Young nihilist men dressed in ill-fitting dark coats, aspiring to look like unpolished workers, let their hair grow bushy and often wore blue-tinted glasses. Correspondingly, the young women cut their hair shorter, wore large plain dresses and could be seen with a shawl or a big hat, together with the characteristic glasses. Such a nihilist could, however, above all be identified by a reversal of official etiquette; the men demonstratively refusing to act chivalrously in the presence of women, and the women behaving contrary to expectations. Both sexes hence sought to incarnate Bazarov’s roughness, his "cynicism of manner and expression."

Literary works and journals quickly became enrapt with polemical debate over nihilism. Nikolay Chernyshevsky for his part saw Turgenev's novel as a personal attack on Nikolay Dobrolyubov, and Maxim Antonovich attacked the book with such vitriol that others in the movement took issue with him. Pisarev famously published his own review at the time of the novel's release, where he championed Bazarov as the role model for the new generation and celebrated the embrace of nihilism. To him, Bazarovism was the societal struggle that must be toiled through rather than resisted—he attributed it to the exclusive and distinct spiritual strength of the young and their courage to face social disorder. The popularity of Pisarev's review rivaled that of even the novel itself.

The atmosphere of the 1860s had led to a period of great social and economic upheaval across the country and the driving force of revolutionary activism was taken up by university students in Moscow and St. Petersburg. Mass arson broke out in St. Petersburg in the spring and summer of 1862 and, coinciding with insurrections in Poland, in 1863. Fyodor Dostoevsky saw Nikolay Chernyshevsky as responsible for inciting the revolutionaries to action and supposedly pleaded with him to bring a stop to it. Historian James William Buel writes that while St. Petersburg faced threat of destruction, arson became rampant all throughout Russia.

Turgenev's own opinion of Bazarov is highly ambiguous, stating: "Did I want to abuse Bazarov or extol him? I do not know myself, since I don't know whether I love him or hate him!" Nevertheless, Bazarov represented the triumph of the raznochinnaya intelligentsia over those like Turgenev from the aristocracy. Comparing to Ivan Goncharov's The Precipice, which he describes as a caricature of nihilism, Peter Kropotkin states in his memoirs that Bazarov was a more admirable portrayal yet was still found dissatisfying to nihilists for his harsh attitude, his coldness towards his old parents, and his neglect of duties as a citizen.

== What Is to Be Done? ==
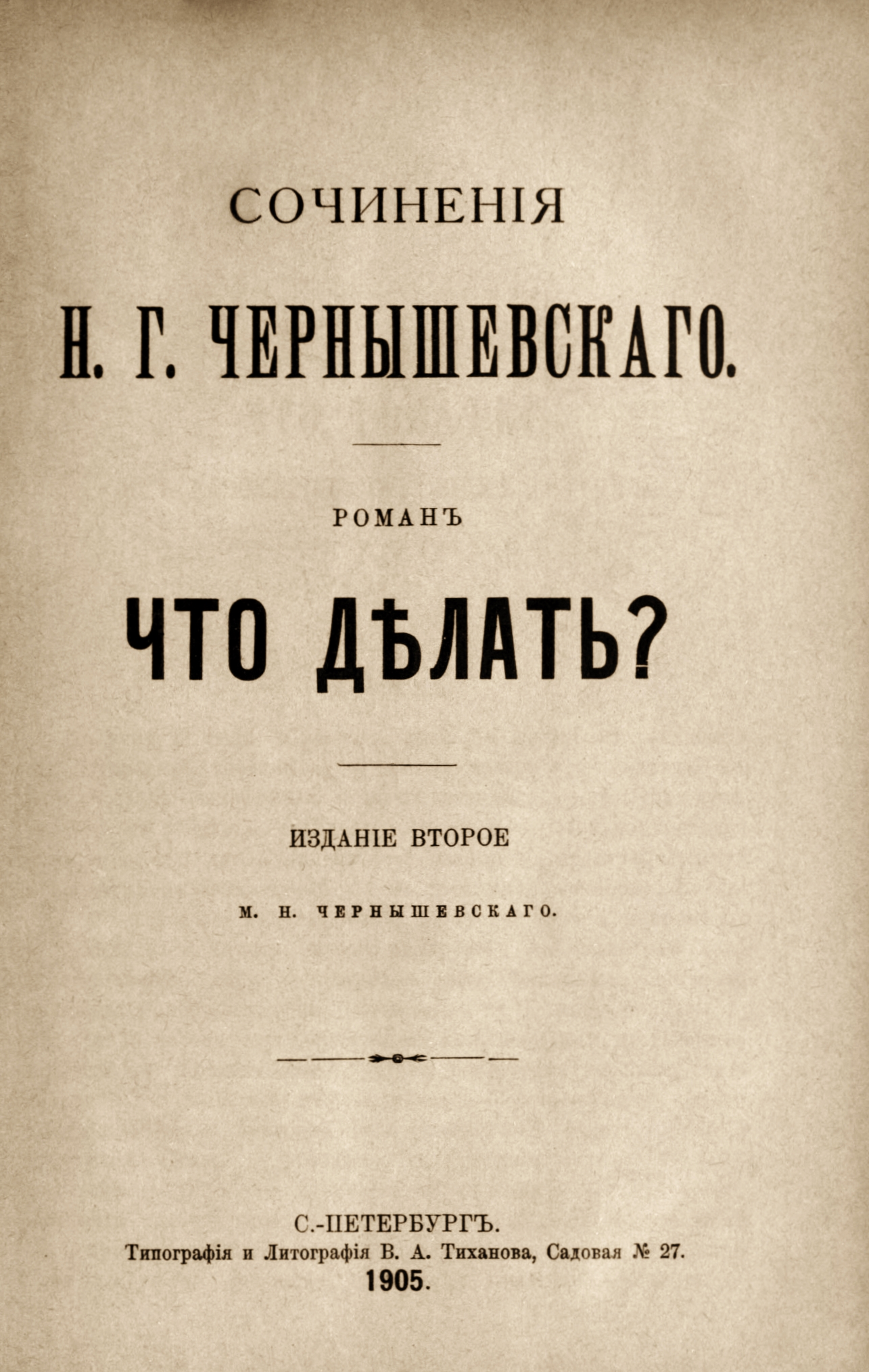
Title page of the 1905 edition of What Is to Be Done?

Chernyshevsky published his landmark 1863 novel What Is to Be Done? while being held at Peter and Paul Fortress as a political prisoner. The novel marked a significant departure for Chernyshevsky into utopian socialism. By an extraordinary failure of bureaucracy, government censors allowed the book to be published without any trouble despite it being the most openly revolutionary work of its era and a direct product of the suppression Chernyshevsky had faced. The novel (particularly its ascetic revolutionary Rakhmetov) would inspire Sergei Nechayev and Nikolai Ishutin.

In the meantime, extensive castigation of nihilism had found its place in Russian publication, official government documents, and a burgeoning trend of antinihilistic literature. Notable earlier works of this literary current include Aleksey Pisemsky's Troubled Seas (1863), Nikolai Leskov's No Way Out (1864), and Viktor Klyushnikov's The Mirage (1864). Also in 1864, Fyodor Dostoevsky published his novel Notes from Underground as a direct satire upon Chernyshevsky's novel. Interestingly, the protagonist both criticizes and is a parody of Chernyshevsky's views on egoism. Dostoevsky posited this dislikable glorifier of self-will as a more realistic portrayal of an egoist than the benign depictions of rational self-interest. "[Chenyshevsky's] virtuous fictional creations were not the genuine, flesh-and-blood egoists whose growing presence in Russia Dostoevsky feared", writes scholar James P. Scanlan. "Yet the doctrine these pseudo-egoists advanced – rational egoism – was a genuine danger, because by glorifying the self it could turn the minds of impressionable young people away from sound values and push them in the direction of a true, immoral, destructive egoism."

Chernyshevsky continued to write essays and literature while incarcerated. In 1864, he was sentenced and given a mock execution before being exiled to Siberia, where he served seven years in forced labour camps followed by further imprisonment. Chernyshevsky gained a legendary reputation as a martyr of the radical movement and, unlike Mikhail Bakunin, not once did he plead for mercy or pardon during his treatment at the hands of the state.

== Schism ==
Leading up to 1864, the movement underwent what Dostoevsky termed the 'schism of the nihilists'. The Sovremennik (Russian: Современник, lit. 'The Contemporary') began taking a more moderate or even regressive position while Russkoye Slovo (Russian: Русское слово, lit. 'Russian Word') continued to push further into radical nihilism. Maxim Antonovich, now head of the Sovremennik's literary criticism department entered into bitter disputes with other publications ever since his disagreements with Pisarev over Bazarovism. Under Pisarev, Russkoye Slovo took over as the leading journal of radical thought.

== Attempted assassination of Alexander II ==
=== Conspiracy organisations ===
Revolutionary organizations during the 1860s took only the form of conspiratorial groups. From the revolutionary turmoil of the years 1859–1861, which had included peasant uprisings in Bezdna and Kandievka, the secret society Land and Liberty (Russian: Земля и воля, romanized: Zemlya i volya) emerged under the strong influence of Nikolay Chernyshevsky's writings. Among its key members were Nikolai Serno-Solovyevich, his brother Aleksandr Serno-Solovyevich, Aleksandr Sleptsov, Nikolai Obruchev and Vasily Kurochkin. The full extent of the organization spanned St. Petersburg, Moscow, Kazan, Nizhny Novgorod, Perm, and several cities in Ukraine.

The group supported the intellectual development of social and political thought that expressed the critical interests of the Russian peasantry, and also worked to publish and disseminate prohibited revolutionary writings and ideas to commoners, intellectuals, and soldiers. Alexander Herzen, Nikolay Ogarev, and Mikhail Bakunin all kept contact with its leadership. Land and Liberty accrued supporters within the Russian military and allied itself with revolutionary activity in Poland. In league with the organization was the Ishutin Circle, founded in Moscow in 1863, under the leadership of Nikolai Ishutin. Historian Shneer Mendelevich Levin writes:

During 1863, the revolutionary situation in Russia virtually exhausted itself. The general peasant uprising, toward which Zemlya i volya was oriented, did not take place, and the Polish uprising was suppressed. Under these conditions, the revolutionary work of Zemlya i volya began to die down. Many members of the society were arrested or were forced to emigrate, and by the spring of 1864, Zemlya i volya had dissolved itself.

After the disappearance of Land and Liberty, the Ishutin Circle began to unite various underground groups in Moscow. The group arranged the escape of Polish revolutionary Jarosław Dąbrowski from prison in 1864. The same year, the group founded a bookbinding workshop, then in 1865, a sewing workshop, a tuition-free school, and a cotton wadding cooperative. They failed, however, in their attempts to arrange Chernyshevsky's escape from penal servitude. Ties were forged with Russian political émigrés, Polish revolutionaries, and fellow organizations in Saratov, Nizhny Novgorod, Kaluga Province, and elsewhere. The Circle then formed a steering committee, known as the Organization, and a sub-group within it known as Hell. Dmitry Karakozov, who was the cousin of Nikolai Ishutin, joined the Circle in 1866 and on April 4 of that year carried out an attempted assassination of Alexander II, firing a shot at the Tsar at the gates of the Summer Garden in Saint Petersburg. The attempt failed and Karakozov was sentenced to death. Nikolai Ishutin was also arrested and sentenced to be executed before ultimately being exiled to a life of forced labour in Siberia. In total, thirty-two members of the Circle were sentenced.

=== Surge of antinihilism ===
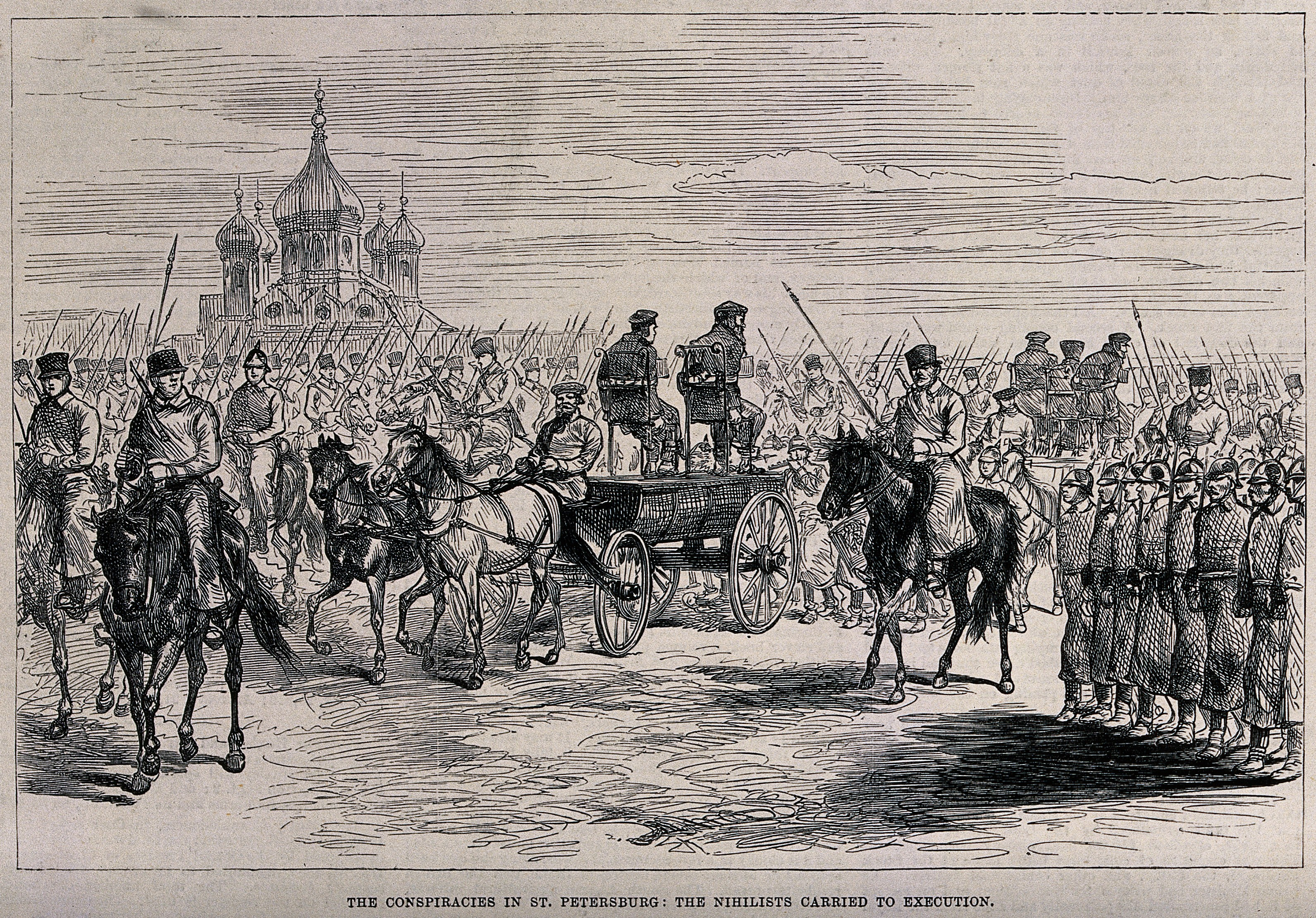
Russian nihilists tied to chairs on horse-drawn platforms and paraded past groups of soldiers on their way to execution in St. Petersburg

Following the attempt on the Tsar's life, the political environment in Russia immediately began returning to the stifling atmosphere of Nicholas I's rule.

Dostoevsky published his following work, Crime and Punishment, in 1866, particularly in response to Pisarev's writings.

== Revolutionary period ==
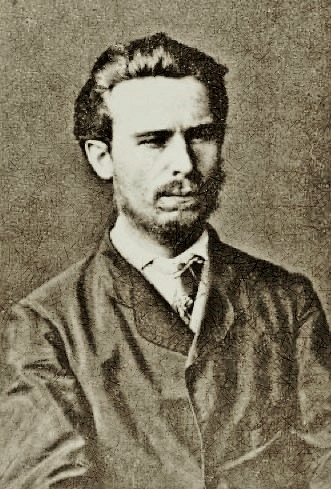
Sergey Nechayev, nihilist revolutionary most often associated with propaganda of the deed and terrorism

=== Re-establishment of Land and Liberty ===
Land and Liberty was re-established in 1876, originally under the name "Northern Revolutionary-Populist Group" (Russian: Северная революционно-народническая группа, romanized: Severnaia revoliutsionno-narodnicheskaia gruppa), by Mark Natanson and Alexander Dmitriyevich Mikhaylov. As a political party, the organization became the first to separate itself from past conspiratorial groups with its open advocacy of revolution. The party was predominated by Bakuninists, though became the first truly Narodnik organization to emerge.

=== End of Nechayev and the first nihilist revolution ===
Sergei Nechayev heightened aggression within the movement and pressed for violent conflict against the tsarist regime. He appeared on the scene in 1868, and soon afterward fled to Switzerland. Bakunin, an admirer of Nechayev's zeal and success, provided contacts and resources to send Nechayev back to Russia to found a new secret cell based organization, called the People's Retribution (Russian: Народная расправа, romanized: Narodnaya Rasprava), based on the principles of Nechayev's manifesto Catechism of a Revolutionary. The uncompromising tone and content of the Catechism was influential far beyond the mere character Nechayev personified in the minds of the revolutionaries.

The organization had just a few dozen members when student Ivan Ivanovich Ivanov—one of Nechayev's first and most active followers—began to protest the leader's methods. This threat to his authority spurred Nechayev into action. He secretly gathered the group members closest to him, declared that the mysterious imaginary central committee possessed the evidence of Ivanov's betrayal, albeit not producible for security reasons, and obtained his death sentence. Author Ronald Hingley writes: "On the evening of 21 November 1869 the victim [Ivanov] was accordingly lured to the premises of the Moscow School of Agriculture, a hotbed of revolutionary sentiment, where Nechayev killed him by shooting and strangulation, assisted without great enthusiasm by three dupes. [...] Nechayev's accomplices were arrested and tried", while he managed to flee back to Switzerland again.

Upon his return from Russia to Switzerland, Nechayev was rejected by Bakunin for taking militant actions and was later extradited back to Russia where he spent the remainder of his life at the Peter and Paul Fortress. Due to his charisma and force of will, Nechayev continued to influence events, maintaining a relationship to the organization People's Will (Russian: Наро́дная во́ля, romanized: Narodnaya Volya) and weaving even his jailers into his plots and escape plans. In December 1881, 69 members of the prison guard were arrested and Nechayev's prison regime was rendered exceedingly harsher. He was found dead of scurvy in his cell on 21 November 1882.

== See also ==
- Anti-nihilistic novel
- Cynicism
- Narodniks
- Narodnaya Volya
- Nihilist Faction

== Sources ==
- Nihilism, Anarchy, and the 21st Century.
- George Kennan and the Russian Empire: How America's Conscience Became an Enemy of Tsarism by Helen Hundley.
- Wasiolek, Edward. Fathers and Sons: Russia at the Cross-roads. New York: Twayne Publishers, 1993. ISBN 0-8057-9445-X.
