= Pyotr Tkachev =

Russian revolutionary theorist (1844–1886)

- Пётр Ткачёв
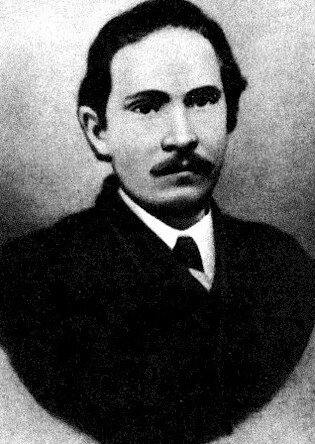
- Born: 29 June 1844; Sivtsovo, Pskov Governorate, Russian Empire
- Died: 4 January 1886 (aged 41); Paris, France
- Occupations: Writer; critic; revolutionary theoretician

Pyotr Nikitich Tkachev (Russian: Пётр Никитич Ткачёв; 29 June 1844 – 4 January 1886) was a Russian writer, critic, and revolutionary theorist who formulated many of the revolutionary principles that were later developed and put into action by Vladimir Lenin. Although Tkachev is sometimes described as "the First Bolshevik", he did not figure prominently in the mythology of the Soviet Union.

== Biography ==
=== Early life ===
Tkachev was born in 1844 to a minor gentry family. He was born in the village of Sivistov, at the time located in the Pskov Governorate. His sister Alexandra Nikitichna Annenskaya was a writer for young adults.

Tkachev began attending St. Petersburg University in 1861 and took part in a series of violent student protests that year. Arrested by police during a riot on 11 October 1861, he likely came into contact with radical Russian political philosophy through other inmates during the months he was incarcerated at a Kronstadt prison. After his arrest due to participating in the student strikes of 1861, Tkachev later spent several years in Peter and Paul Fortress.

=== Political career ===
Tkachev praised Nikolay Chernyshevsky's novel What Is to Be Done?, calling it the "gospel of the movement".

Populists like Tkachev argued against waiting indefinitely for the social revolution while also in the meantime condemned revolt and terrorism by the vanguard as he believed it risked allowing the tsarist government to stabilise itself by the advancement of capitalism. Only the establishment of a revolutionary dictatorship through seizure of power made it possible to ensure the correct political conditions for a transition to socialism. This would become the guiding principle of Vladimir Lenin's theory of revolution.

The populists returned to Jacobin methods of coups, conspiracy and terrorism in the name of the people in the 1870s after having exchanged it for social revolution. According to Figes, Tkachev's writings marked the "crucial watershed", establishing a bridge between Nechayev's Jacobinism, the populists' "classic tradition of Land and Liberty" and Lenin's Marxist tradition.

=== Meeting with Sergey Nechayev and exile ===
By the mid-1870s, Tkachev had become mesmerised by the works of Sergey Nechayev which would lead to him spending another time in prison before going into exile in Switzerland. It was here in Switzerland that Tkachev crudely adopted Karl Marx's sociology which resulted in him parting ways with populism.

In the mid-1870s, Tkachev formulated a violent critique of the Going to the People movement which had consisted of thousands of students and populists travelling to peasant villages to live and preach among serfs. In it, he formulated his belief that propaganda could not initiate a revolution because "the laws of social progress" made it so that the regime always would have the support of wealthier peasants.

Therefore, he instead advocated performing a coup, a seizure of power by a revolutionary vanguard by which would then proceed with establishing a revolutionary dictatorship and initiate the transition to socialism. Tkachev believed that the time was perfect for the seizure of power and that it should be done as soon as possible while there was no social force that was prepared to side with the government, something that would come with the development of the bourgeoisie and capitalism.

A rallying cry in one of the critique's passages, which were later to be copied by Lenin in October 1917, read: "This is why we cannot wait. This is why we claim that a revolution is indispensable, and indispensable now, at this very moment, We cannot allow the postponement. It is now or—perhaps very soon—never". He further wrote that a conspiratorial and elitist party, disciplined and centralised akin to an army, was essential for that to succeed, which was also later echoed by Lenin.

=== Later life and death ===
In 1882 Tkachev fell seriously ill and spent his last few years in a psychiatric hospital. He died on 4 January 1886 in Paris at the age of 41.

== Political ideas ==
Historian Andrzej Walicki argued that the form of economic determinism espoused by Tkachev differed significantly with the historical materialism developed by Karl Marx and Friedrich Engels, stating: "This specific 'economic materialism' of Tkachev did not amount to Marxism; it constituted rather in a peculiar mixture of some elements of Marxism with a rather primitive utilitarianism, grossly exaggerating the role of direct economic motivation in individual behavior".

=== Impact and following ===
A radical terrorist group called the People's Will (Narodnaya Volya) formed in 1879, influenced by Tkachev's teaching, would assassinate Tsar Alexander II on 1 March 1881.

=== Vladimir Lenin and Tkachevism ===
Orlando Figes has claimed that Lenin owed more to Tkachev than any other Russian theorist. Chief among the ideas that Tkachev espoused that were influential in the development of Lenin's political philosophy was the idea of a revolutionary vanguard. While not explicitly using this Leninist term, Tkachev argued that in the absence of a popular, peasant-based revolution, revolutionaries should rise up and defeat a tyrannical government. The Leninist approach to Marxism was rooted in his origins in the Russian revolutionary movement, with the writings and ideas of Tkachev, Nikolay Chernyshevsky, Pyotr Zaichnevsky, Sergey Nechayev and the People's Will injected into the passive Marxism to give it a "Russian dose of conspiratorial politics". This enabled the precipitation of a revolution by political action.

Tkachev was a proponent of a closely organised revolutionary party: his vision of the revolutionary process was very close to that of the French Blanquist movement, although perhaps not directly influenced by it. Yet, in his commemoration of Blanqui, which could not be delivered on the occasion of his death but was published in Ni Dieu, ni maître on 9 January 1881, Tkachev himself acknowledged with deep-felt words the Russian revolutionaries' debt to him: "Yes, he was our inspirer and our role model in the great art of conspiracy." In Tkachev's eyes, the principal duty of revolutionary parties was not to engage in propaganda efforts, but to overthrow the government, to seize power in the name of the proletariat and to establish a harsh revolutionary dictatorship.

Hal Draper had argued against this view, pointing out that Tkachev is only mentioned a handful of times in Lenin's writings and the only significant reference to him in What Is to Be Done? is a negative one.

Friedrich Engels also took issue with Tkachev and his ideas about Russian development.

== Bibliography ==
- Figes, Orlando (2014). A People's Tragedy: The Russian Revolution 1891–1924. London: The Bodley Head. ISBN 9781847922915.
- Hardy, Deborah (1977). Petr Tkachev: The Critic as Jacobin. Seattle: University of Washington Press. ISBN 0-295-95547-3
- Riasanovsky, Nicholas (2000). A History of Russia (sixth ed.). Oxford University Press. p. 383. ISBN 0-19-512179-1.
- Venturi, Franco (1972). "Pëtr Nikitič Tkačëv". Il populismo russo (in Italian). Vol. II: Dalla liberazione dei servi al nihilismo (2 ed.). Turin: Einaudi. pp. 326–393. (English language edition of the whole work, introduced by Isaiah Berlin: Roots of Revolution: A History of the Populist and Socialist Movements in 19th Century Russia. Translated by Haskell, Francis (2 ed.). Chicago: University of Chicago Press. 1983.)
