= Serdobsky District =

Serdobsky District Сердобский район (Russian)
- District
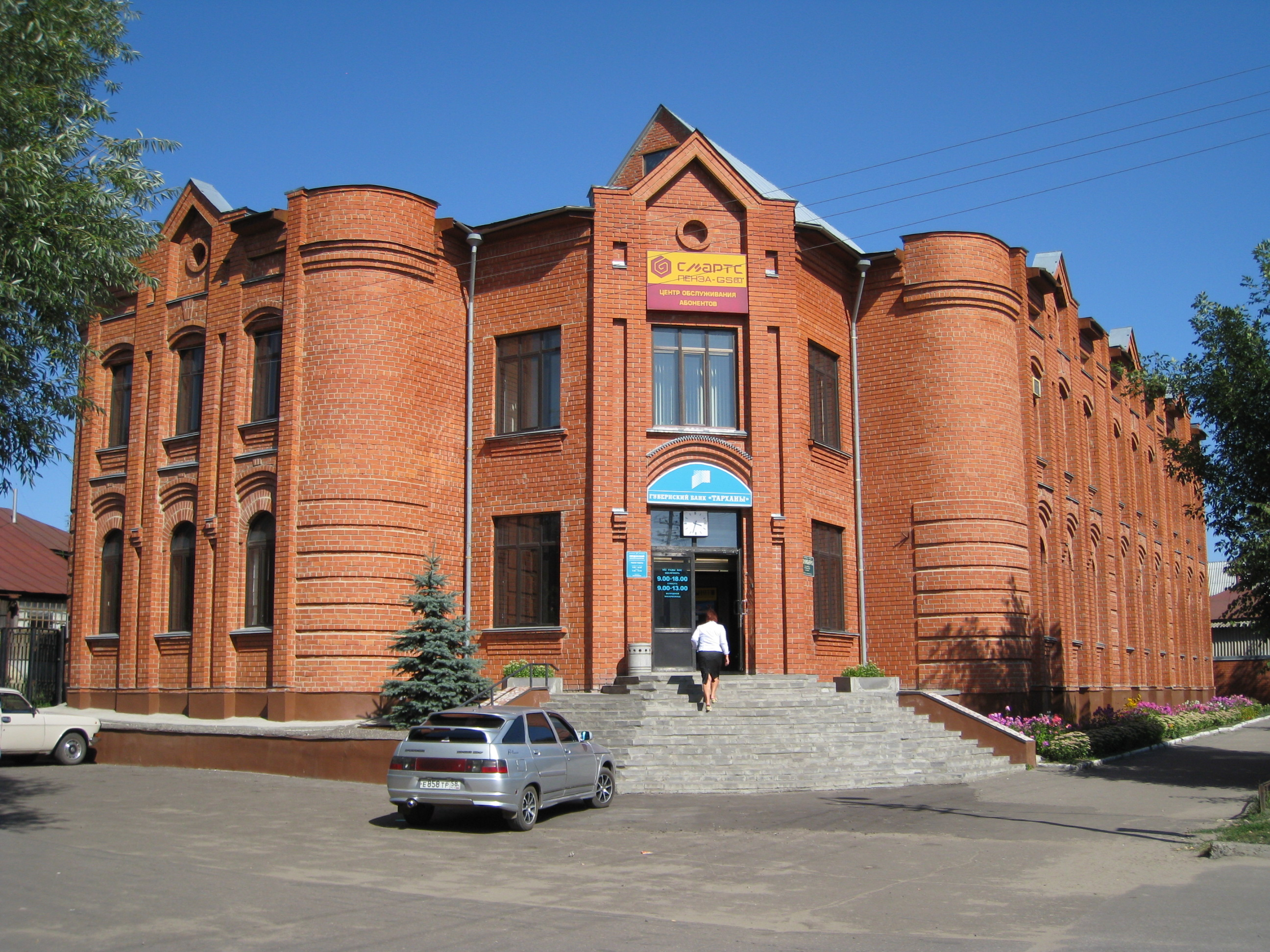
- Bank office, Serdobsky District

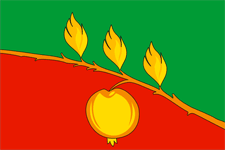
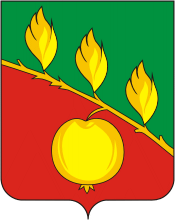
- Flag Coat of arms
- Location of Serdobsky District in Penza Oblast
- Coordinates: 52°28′N 44°13′E
- Country: Russia
- Federal subject: Penza Oblast
- Administrative center: Serdobsk

Area
  - Total: 1,695 km^{2} (654 sq mi)

Population (2010 Census)
  - Total: 54,520
  - Density: 32.17/km^{2} (83.31/sq mi)
  - Urban: 64.9%
  - Rural: 35.1%

Administrative structure
  - Administrative divisions: 1 Towns of district significance, 11 Selsoviets
  - Inhabited localities: 1 cities/towns, 44 rural localities

Municipal structure
  - Municipally incorporated as: Serdobsky Municipal District
  - Municipal divisions: 1 urban settlements, 11 rural settlements
- Time zone: UTC+3 (MSK)
- OKTMO ID: 56656000
- Website: http://rserd.pnzreg.ru/

Serdobsky District (Russian: Сердо́бский райо́н) is an administrative and municipal district (raion), one of the twenty-seven in Penza Oblast, Russia. It is located in the southwest of the oblast. The area of the district is 1,695 square kilometers (654 sq mi). Its administrative center is the town of Serdobsk. Population: 54,520 (2010 Census); 21,917 (2002 census); 21,289 (1989 Soviet census). The population of Serdobsk accounts for 64.9% of the district's total population.
