= Vasily Bervi-Flerovsky =

Russian economist and sociologist

- Василий Берви-Флеровский
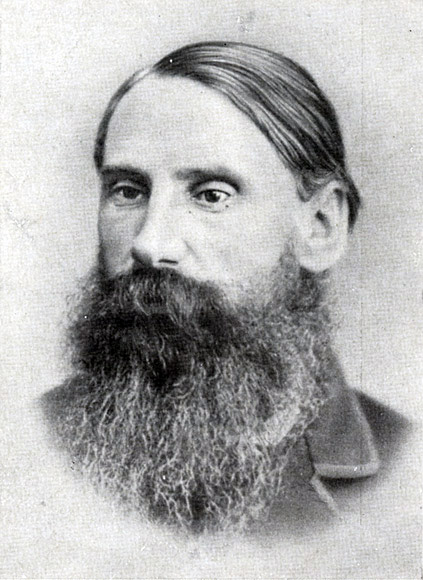
- Born: Wilhelm Wilhelmovich Bervi; 10 May 1829; Ryazan Governorate, Russian Empire
- Died: 4 October 1918 (aged 89); Yuzovka (Now Dontesk), Russian SFSR
- Education: Kazan State University
- Occupations: Economist, sociologist, journalist

Vasily Vasiliyevich Bervi-Flerovsky (born Wilhelm Wilhelmovich Bervi; 10 May [O.S. 28 April] 1829 – 4 October 1918) was a Russian economist, sociologist, journalist and prominent theorist of the Narodnik and nihilist movements.

== Biography ==
Vasily Bervi was born in to the family of Wilhelm Bervi, a Russified Englishman who was a professor of physiology at the Kazan University. Vasily Bervi himself enrolled in the university where he studied law.

During his studies at the Kazan University, Bervi was acquainted with socialist and liberal figures, such as members of the Petrashevsky Circle. After graduation, Bervi worked as an official in the Ministry of Justice. From the end of the 1850s, he became closer to the leaders of the democratic movement (such as Nikolai Nekrasov, Nikolai Chernyshevsky and others). He was arrested in 1861 according to the so-called. "the case of the Tver peace mediators". Bervi was subjected to administrative punishment and exiled to Astrakhan, and in 1864 to Siberia. With his family he was settled in Kuznetsk, then, at the request, he was transferred to Tomsk where he came in to conflict with its governor. In 1866, Bervi received permission to return to Vologda, but his transfer was delayed. Bervi traveled from Tyumen to Kazan on foot. He was in exile under secret supervision until 1887.

Bervi-Flerovsky had a special influence on the narodnik participants in the “going to the people” movement of the early 1870s. He himself led a fairly active propaganda campaign (he called it "pedagogical") from his first exile to Astrakhan and had extensive experience in this field.

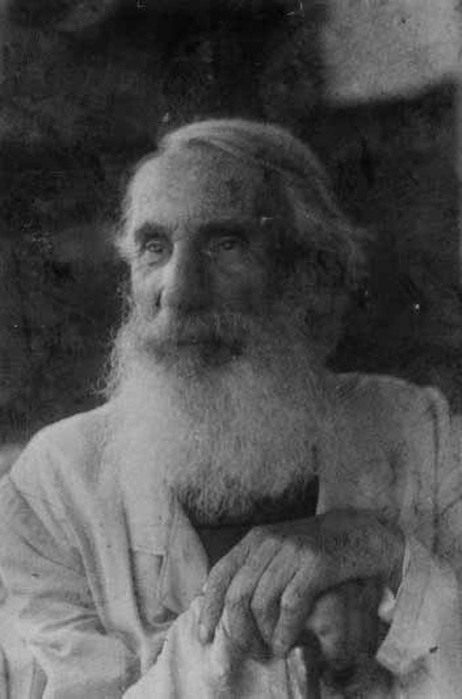
Bervi-Flerovsky in old age

Bevri-Flerovsky was an employee of the magazines Delo, Russkoye Slovo and Otechestvennye Zapiski. In the early 1890s, he spent some time in exile in London, where he collaborated with the Free Russian Press Foundation, founded by Sergey Stepnyak-Kravchinsky, which published several parts of the ABC of the Social Sciences and the memoirs Three Political Systems. After the death of Stepnyak-Kravchinsky, Bervi-Flerovsky returned to Russia, using the coronation manifesto of Nicholas II.

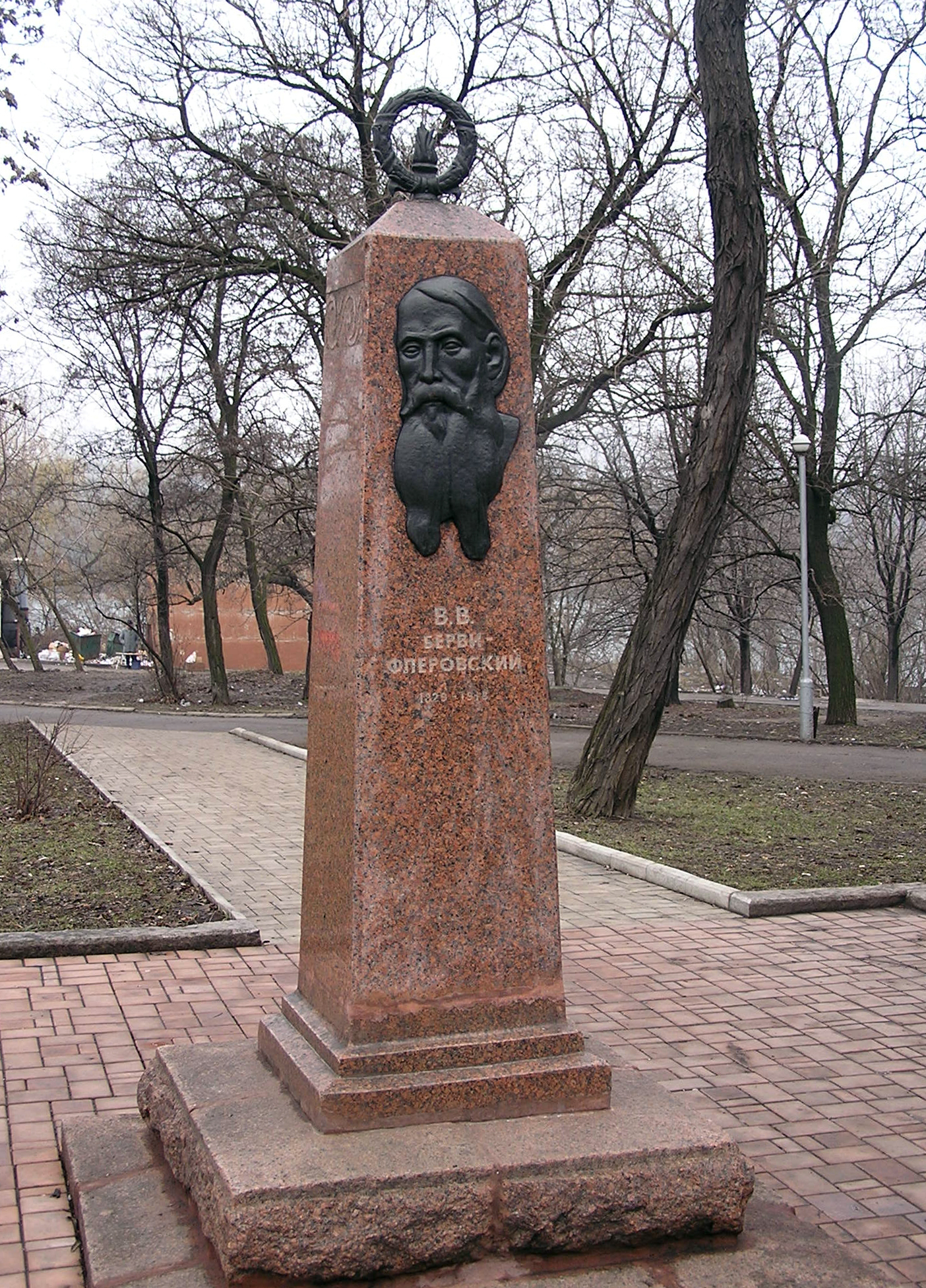
Monument to Vasily Bervi-Flerovsky in Donetsk

He died in Yuzovka in October 1918, where he came to his son Fyodor, who worked as a doctor, and lived there from 1897 to 1918. In Yuzovka, before his death, he wrote Critique of the Basic Ideas of Natural Science (1904) and A Brief Autobiography.

== Selected works ==
On socio-political, philosophical and economic issues, he wrote more than fifty works. Bervi-Flerovsky's main works include: "The Condition of the Working Class in Russia" (1869), "The ABC of the Social Sciences" (1871), memoirs "Three political systems: Nicholas I, Alexander II and Alexander III" (1891) (abridged version - “Notes of a Revolutionary Dreamer” (1929)), novel “On Life and Death. Image of the idealists "(Geneva - 1877, in Russia - 1907). The book "The Condition of the Working Class in Russia", written on the basis of his own research and Siberian impressions, became a milestone in the history of Russian sociology and was highly appreciated by Karl Marx.
