= Serdobsk =

Town in Penza Oblast, Russia

Serdobsk Сердобск
- Town
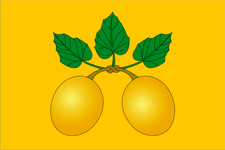
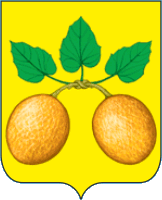
- Flag Coat of arms
- Interactive map of Serdobsk
- Location of Serdobsk Serdobsk (Penza Oblast)
- Coordinates: 52°28′N 44°12′E
- Country: Russia
- Federal subject: Penza Oblast
- Administrative district: Serdobsky District
- Town of district significanceSelsoviet: Serdobsk
- Known since: 1699
- Town status since: 1780
- Elevation: 180 m (590 ft)

Population (2010 Census)
  - Total: 35,393
  - Estimate (2021): 30,220 (−14.6%)

Administrative status
  - Capital of: Serdobsky District, town of district significance of Serdobsk

Municipal status
  - Municipal district: Serdobsky Municipal District
  - Urban settlement: Serdobsk Urban Settlement
  - Capital of: Serdobsky Municipal District, Serdobsk Urban Settlement
- Time zone: UTC+3 (MSK)
- Postal codes: 442890, 442891, 442893-442895, 442899
- Dialing code: +7 84167
- OKTMO ID: 56656101001
- Website: www.gorod-serdobsk.ru

Serdobsk (Russian: Сердо́бск) is a town and the administrative center of Serdobsky District in Penza Oblast, Russia. Population: 35,393 (2010 census); 37,738 (2002 census); 43,518 (1989 Soviet census).

== Geography ==
It is located on the Serdoba River (Don's basin), 111 kilometers (69 mi) southeast of Penza.

=== Climate ===
The climate is moderately continental. The winter in Serdobsk is moderately cold and long lasting from the beginning of November to the end of March. The coldest month is February with an average temperature of -9.1 °C. Summer is warm, lasting from late May to early September; the average July temperature is 20.4 °C. The average annual temperature is 5.5 °C. The climate is similar to Moscow, but the continentality is higher and the precipitation lower.

== History ==
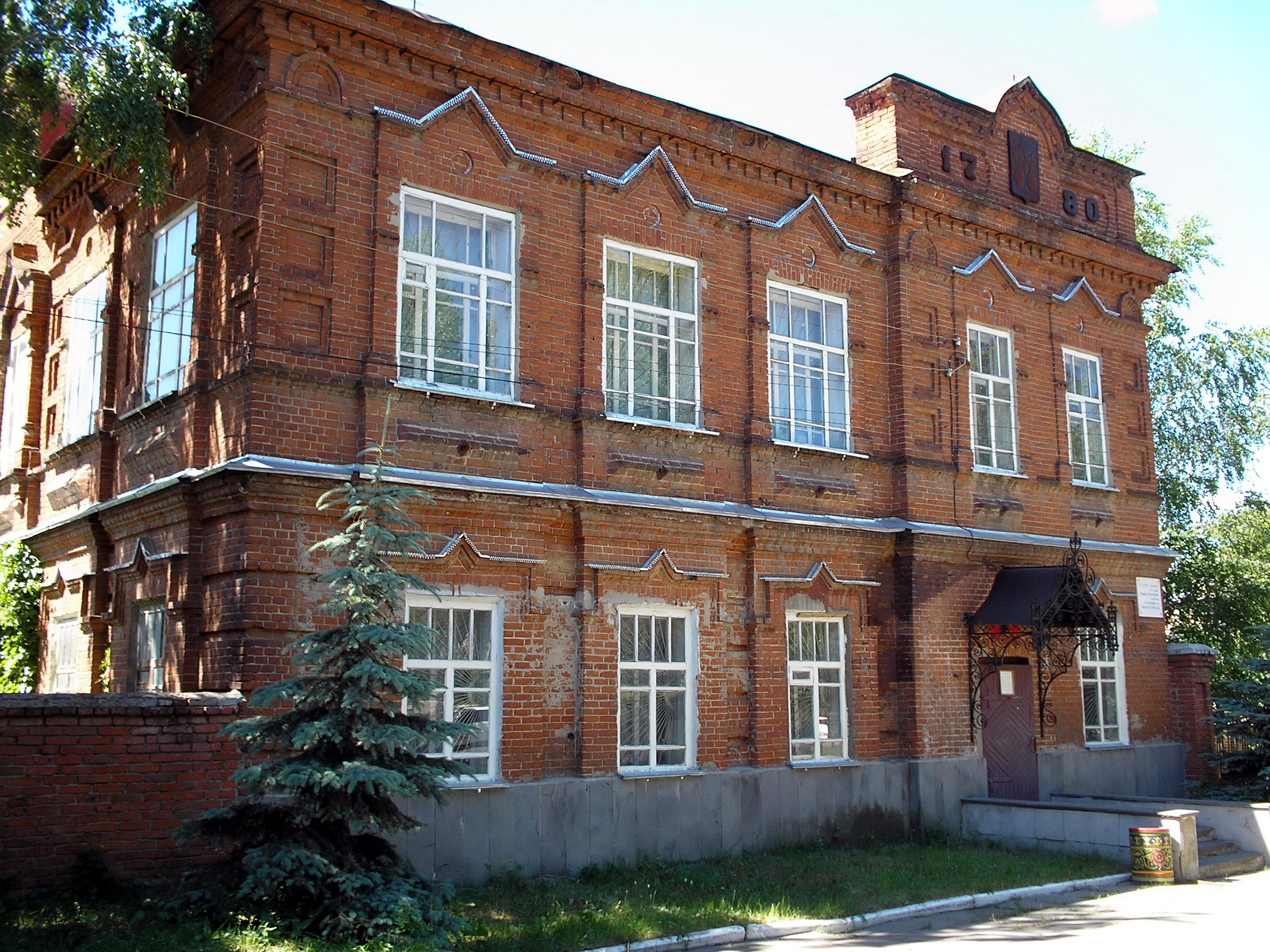
Serdobsk museum of local lore

Founded by Alexander Aleksandrovich of Penza in 1698, it has been known since 1699 as Serdobinskaya sloboda (Сердобинская слобода). Since the mid-18th century, it had been called Bolshaya Serdoba (Больша́я Сердоба). It was granted town status on 7 November 1780 by Catherine II.

In 1865 a wooden church and cemetery was built in the name of St. Nicholas.

== Administrative and municipal status ==
Within the framework of administrative divisions, Serdobsk serves as the administrative center of Serdobsky District. As an administrative division, it is incorporated within Serdobsky District as the town of district significance of Serdobsk. As a municipal division, the town of district significance of Serdobsk is incorporated within Serdobsky Municipal District as Serdobsk Urban Settlement.

== Notable people ==
- Vsevolod Bazhenov (1909–1986), painter
- Nikolai Ishutin (1840–1879), utopian socialist
