= Nikolai Ishutin =

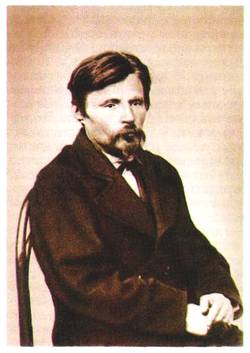
- Born: 15 April 1840; Serdobsk, Russia
- Died: 17 January 1879 (aged 38); Kara katorga, Russia
- Movement: Russian nihilist movement

Nikolai Andreyevich Ishutin (Russian: Николай Андреевич Ишутин; 15 April [O.S. 3 April] 1840 – 17 January [O.S. 5 January] 1879) was one of the first Russian utopian socialists, who combined socialist propaganda with conspiratorial and terrorist tactics.

== Biography ==
Ishutin was a hereditary noble in his hometown of Serdobsk. He was raised in Penza by the family of his cousin Dmitry Karakozov. In 1863, he became a lecturer at Moscow State University, where he propagandized among the students. That same year Ishutin organized a secret revolutionary society, which would come to be known as the Ishutin Society.

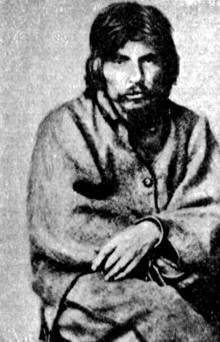
Ishutin in custody, 1875

On April 8, 1866, he was arrested in connection with his cousin Karakozov's assassination attempt on Tsar Alexander II. The Supreme Criminal Court sentenced Ishutin to death by hanging, which was commuted to exile for life shortly before his scheduled execution. Ishutin was placed in solitary confinement in Shlisselburg Fortress until May 1868, when he was transferred, mentally ill, to Algachi prison in Eastern Siberia. In 1871, Ishutin's place of exile was changed to Nerchinsk and, in 1875, to Kara katorga, where he died in 1879.
