= Pyotr Zaichnevsky =

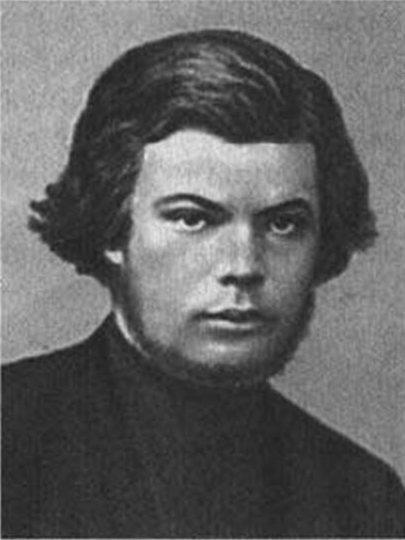
- Zaichnevsky in 1875
- Born: 30 September 1842; Gostinovo, Oryol Governorate, Russian Empire
- Died: 31 March 1896 (aged 53); Smolensk, Russian Empire
- Notable work: Young Russia

Pyotr Grigoryievich Zaichnevsky (Russian: Пётр Григорьевич Заичневский; 30 September 1842 – 31 March 1896) was a Russian revolutionary known as one of the main ideologues of Russian Jacobinism.

== Biography ==
Zaichnevsky was born in to a noble landowning family of a retired colonel. In 1858 he graduated from the Oryol Gymnasium and entered the Physics and Mathematics Department of Moscow University. As a student, he became interested in the works of Western European socialists such Pierre Proudhon and Auguste Blanqui and soon became a member of the revolutionary circle "Library of Kazan Students".

In 1861, together with student Pericles Argyropoulos, he organized a student circle that published banned literature by Alexander Herzen and Ludwig Feuerbach, and promoted revolutionary ideas. In July 1861, he was arrested and sentenced for distributing banned literature and calling for the overthrow of the monarchy to the deprivation of all rights and property. He was exiled to Krasnoyarsk for hard labor for two years and 8 months, followed by permanent settlement in Siberia.

In 1862, while still under investigation in a cell at the Tver police station, he wrote the proclamation " Young Russia ", which contained a Blanquist program for a revolutionary coup and became known as the revolutionary manifesto of the Jacobin republicans. The proclamation was illegally published and distributed by members of Zaichnevsky's Moscow student circle in May 1862 on behalf of the fictitious Central Revolutionary Committee.

In 1864, Zaichnevsky was sent to Vitim (Yakutia), where he lived until 1869, when he was given permission to return to European Russia in the Penza province. In 1872, Zaichnevsky was allowed, under the personal responsibility of his father, to move to his father's estate in the Oryol province under police supervision. Together with Vasily Artsybushev, he organized conspiratorial revolutionary circles in Oryol and Kursk. In August 1877 he was arrested and exiled to the town of Povenets in the Olonetsk province, where he organized a library, which became a center for exiles. At the end of 1880, Zaichnevsky was allowed to move to Kostroma, where he organized a circle of revolutionary-minded youth around himself.

In the second half of the 1880s, he received permission to return to Orel, where he organized a revolutionary circle of the Jacobin trend, established contacts with circles in Moscow, St. Petersburg, Kursk, Smolensk, as well as with the foreign group of Russian Jacobins of Pyotr Tkachev. In 1888 he was again arrested and spent two years in prison, and in 1890 he was exiled to Irkutsk for five years. In Irkutsk, he led the foreign department at "Vostochnoye Obozreniye" (Russian: Восточное обозрение, "The Eastern Review") and worked as a correspondent for the Liberal daily paper "Russkiye Vedomosti".

In 1895, upon returning from exile, he settled in Smolensk, where he soon died in March 1896. Zaichnevsky was buried in Smolensk near the Avraamiev Monastery.
