= Barracks communism =

Critical term used by Karl Marx to describe crude, forced collectivism

Barracks communism (German: Kasernenkommunismus) is the term coined by the German philosopher Karl Marx to refer to a crude, authoritarian, forced collectivism and communism where all aspects of life are bureaucratically regimented and communal. Marx used the expression to criticise the vision of Sergey Nechayev outlined in "The Fundamentals of the Future Social System". The term barracks here does not refer to military barracks, but to the workers' barracks-type primitive dormitories in which the industrial workers lived in many places in the Russian Empire of the time.

In the ideology of the Soviet Union the term was applied to theories of "some ideologues in China" of the 1950s-1970s. During the Soviet perestroika period, the term was used to apply to the history of the Soviet Union itself.

== Origin ==
A relevant section of Sergey Nechayev's "The Fundamentals of the Future Social System" reads as follows:

The ending of the existing social order and the renewal of life with the aid of the new principles can be accomplished only by concentrating all the means of social existence in the hands of our committee, and the proclamation of compulsory physical labour for everyone.

The committee, as soon as the present institutions have been overthrown, proclaims that everything is common property, orders the setting up of workers' societies (artels) and at the same time publishes statistical tables compiled by the people who know and pointing out what branches of labour are most needed in a certain locality and what branches may run into difficulties there.

For a certain number of days assigned for the revolutionary upheaval and the disorders that are bound to follow, each person must join one or another of these artels according to his own choice... All those who remain isolated and unattached to workers' groups without sufficient reason will have no right of access either to the communal eating places or to the communal dormitories, or to any other buildings assigned to meet the various needs of the brother-workers or that contain the goods and materials, the victuals or tools reserved for all members of the established workers' society; in a word, he who without sufficient reason has not joined an artel, will be left without means of subsistence. All the roads, all the means of communication will be closed to him; he will have no other alternative but work or death.

The report "The Alliance of Socialist Democracy and the International Working Men's Association", an explanation and justification of the expulsion of Bakunin's faction from the International (written by Karl Marx and Friedrich Engels with the assistance of Paul Lafargue) quotes the above text and comments as follows:

What a beautiful model of barrack-room communism! Here you have it all: communal eating, communal sleeping, assessors and offices regulating education, production, consumption, in a word, all social activity, and to crown all, our committee, anonymous and unknown to anyone, as the supreme director. This is indeed the purest anti-authoritarianism.

== See also ==
- War communism
- "The happiest barrack"
