= Znamenskoye, Znamensky District, Oryol Oblast =

Rural locality in Oryol Oblast, Russia

Znamenskoye Знаменское
- Selo
- Interactive map of Znamenskoye
- Location of Znamenskoye Znamenskoye (Oryol Oblast)
- Coordinates: 53°16′38″N 35°40′57″E
- Country: Russia
- Federal subject: Oryol Oblast
- Administrative district: Znamensky District
- First mentioned: 1749

Population (2010 Census)
  - Total: 1,699
  - Estimate (2010): 1,699 (0%)

Administrative status
  - Capital of: Znamensky District, Znamenskoye Selsoviet

Municipal status
  - Municipal district: Znamensky Municipal District
  - Rural settlement: Znamenskoye Selsoviet Rural Settlement
  - Capital of: Znamensky Municipal District, Znamenskoye Selsoviet Rural Settlement
- Time zone: UTC+3 (MSK)
- Postal code: 303100
- Dialing code: +7 48662
- OKTMO ID: 54620412101

Znamenskoye (Russian: Знаменское) is a rural locality (a selo) and the administrative center of Znamensky District, Oryol Oblast, Russia. Population: 1,699 (2010 census); 1,976 (2002 census); 1,549 (1989 Soviet census).
