= Revolutionary =

Person who participates in or advocates for a revolution

A revolutionary is a person who either participates in, or advocates for, a revolution.

== Revolution and ideology ==
According to sociologist James Chowning Davies, political revolutionaries may be classified in two ways:

1. According to the goals of the revolution they propose. Usually, these goals are part of a certain ideology. In theory, each ideology could generate its own brand of revolutionaries. In practice, most political revolutionaries have been communists, socialists, Islamists, syndicalists, anarchists, or nationalists.
2. According to the methods they propose to use. This divides revolutionaries in two broad groups: Those who advocate a violent revolution, and those who are pacifists.

=== Anarchism ===
The revolutionary anarchist Sergey Nechayev argued in Catechism of a Revolutionary:

"The revolutionary is a doomed man. He has no private interests, no affairs, sentiments, ties, property nor even a name of his own. His entire being is devoured by one purpose, one thought, one passion - the revolution. Heart and soul, not merely by word but by deed, he has severed every link with the social order and with the entire civilized world; with the laws, good manners, conventions, and morality of that world. He is its merciless enemy and continues to inhabit it with only one purpose - to destroy it."

=== Marxism–Leninism ===
According to Che Guevara, "the true revolutionary is guided by a great feeling of love. It is impossible to think of a true revolutionary lacking in this quality." According to the Marxist Internet Archive, a revolutionary "amplif[ies] the differences and conflicts caused by technological advances in society. Revolutionaries provoke differences and violently ram together contradictions within a society, overthrowing the government through the rising to power of the class they represent. After destructing the old order, revolutionaries help build a new government that adheres to the emerging social relationships that have been made possible by the advanced productive forces."

== See also ==
- List of revolutions and rebellions
- Revolutionary movement
- Revolutionary terror
- World revolution
