= Kuzminki (rural locality) =

Set index of articles associated with the same name

Kuzminki (Russian: Кузьминки) is the name of several rural localities in Russia:

- Kuzminki, Sergiyevo-Posadsky District, Moscow Oblast, a village in Vasilyevskoye Rural Settlement of Sergiyevo-Posadsky District of Moscow Oblast
- Kuzminki, Yegoryevsky District, Moscow Oblast, a village under the administrative jurisdiction of the Town of Yegoryevsk in Yegoryevsky District of Moscow Oblast
- Kuzminki, Tula Oblast, a village in Griboyedovskaya Volost of Kurkinsky District of Tula Oblast
