= What Is to Be Done? (disambiguation) =

What Is to Be Done? is a 1902 political pamphlet by Vladimir Lenin.

What Is to Be Done? may also refer to:

- What Is to Be Done? (novel), an 1863 novel by Nikolai Chernyshevsky
- What Is to Be Done? (Tolstoy book), an 1883 essay by Leo Tolstoy
- Chto Delat? (art collective) (Russian: What Is to Be Done?), an art collective in Saint Petersburg, Russia
- What is to be done?, a collection of speeches and notes by Iranian sociologist Ali Shariati

== See also ==
- Do what has to be done
- To do
- Todo (disambiguation)
