= What Is to Be Done? (Tolstoy book) =

1886 book by Lev Tolstoi

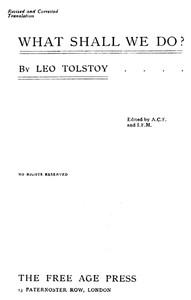
- Author: Leo Tolstoy
- Original title: Так что же нам делать?
- Language: Russian
- Genre: Non-fiction
- Publication date: 1886
- Publication place: Russia

What Is to Be Done?, sometimes translated as What Then Must We Do? (Russian: Так что же нам делать?), is a non-fiction work by Leo Tolstoy in which he describes the social conditions of Russia in his day.

Tolstoy completed the book in 1886 and the first English language publication came in 1887 as What to Do?. A revised translation with the current title was published in 1899.

The English title was also used for two better-known works by Nikolai Chernyshevsky and Vladimir Lenin. Tolstoy's Russian title is similar, but not identical to Chernyshevsky's and Lenin's (Что делать?), both of them sharing the same Biblical reference (Luke 3:10–14).
