= Rakhmetov =

- What Is to Be Done? character
- Created by: Nikolai Chernyshevsky

In-universe information
- Gender: Male
- Nationality: Russian

Rakhmetov (Russian: Рахметов, also romanized as "Rakhmétof") is a fictional character from the 1863 novel What Is to Be Done? by Nikolai Chernyshevsky. His only action in the story is to give the heroine, Vera Pavlovna, a note from her husband explaining that he has faked his suicide. He also offers his criticisms to Vera Pavlovna for her abandoning of her sewing cooperative.

Although Rakhmetov is only a minor character appearing briefly in the third section of the book, he is the most famous because Chernyshevsky's description of Rakhmetov's discipline and valor influenced Russian revolutionaries, most notably Lenin (who wrote a pamphlet similarly titled What Is to Be Done?).

According to Andrew Michael Drozd, the likeliest inspiration for Rakhmetov was Chernyshevsky's acquaintance Pavel Aleksandrovich Bakhmetev, an eccentric "repentant nobleman."

== Description in What Is to Be Done? ==
Rakhmetov is descended from Rakhmet, a thirteenth-century Tatar chief. His ancestors included boyars in Tver and okolnichy in Moscow, and generál-anshéfs in Saint Petersburg. Rakhmetov is the second youngest of eight children. He inherits 400 serfs and 7,000 acres of land. He is 22 when the novel takes place. His father is deeply conservative and clever. At 15, he falls in love with his father's mistress.

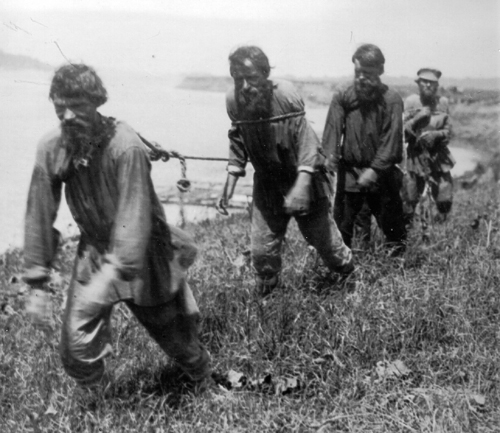
1900s photograph of burlaks on the Volga River. From Rybinsk state historical-architectural art museum and national park photofiles

He studies at St. Petersburg University from 16–19, then gives up his studies to travel, estranging himself from his siblings and in-laws. At 17 he builds up his physical strength through gymnastics, then by barge hauling at 20 from which he gets the nickname Nikitouchka Lomoff, after a legendarily burlak on the Volga. His other nickname is 'the rigorist'. He performs all kinds of manual labor on his travels: digging, sawing and iron forging. He explains that, "This is necessary […] it gives you respect and love among the common people. This is useful, and it may come handy sometime."

He befriends five or six students and studies obsessively, reading continuously for 82 hours, fueled by eight strong coffees before sleeping for 15 hours. He adopts a strict, puritanical way of life. He is celibate, teetotal, sleeps on planks and usually eats black bread and steak. The only luxury he allows himself are fine cigars, for which he provides both an excuse and excoriation ("I cannot think without a cigar. If that is really so, then I am right; but maybe it is from weakness of will power. […] It is a detestable weakness."') In St. Petersburg, he permits himself oranges because there ordinary people eat them, but in the countryside he doesn't touch them.

Browsing library shelves, he calls several authors unoriginal, including Macaulay, Guizot, Thiers, Ranke, Gervinus. He delights in a compendium of Isaac Newton's writings that includes the obscure Observations upon the Prophecies of Daniel and the Apocalypse of St. John; he notes Newton "wrote this commentary when he was old, when he was half sane and half crazy."

After six months continuous reading he decides he has acquired enough knowledge, and pronounces:

"On every subject there are very few first-rate works; all that you can find fuller and clearer in these few, in all the rest is repeated, spoiled, ruined. It is necessary to read only them, and all other reading is only an idle waste of time. Let us take Russian belles lettres. I say: I shall read Gogol before anything else. In the thousand and one other stories I see, from half a dozen lines on half a dozen different pages, that they contain nothing else but Gogol spoiled; why should I read them, then? The same thing in science; in science this limit is still more striking. If I have read Adam Smith, Malthus, Ricardo, and Mill, I know the alpha and the omega of their theories, and I have no need of reading hundreds of other political economists, no matter how famous they may be: by half a dozen lines on half a dozen pages I see that I shall not find one single fresh thought which belongs to them; they are all borrowed and mutilated. I read only spontaneous works, and only to such a degree as to appreciate their spontaneity." Therefore, it was impossible to make him read Macaulay; after spending a quarter of an hour on different pages, he decided: I know all the originals from which this matter is taken. He read Thackeray's Vanity Fair with delight, and he began to read Pendennis, but he gave it up when he reached the twentieth page. "All this is said in 'Vanity Fair'; apparently there will be nothing more, and so there is no need of reading it. Every book that I read in such a way spares me the necessity of reading hundreds of books," he used to say.

He never visits people longer than necessary and only visits people with influence over others. He only visits his home to sleep at two or three in the morning. His ultimate act of self punishment is sleeping on a bed of nails, which he admits as, "incredible, of course; however, it is necessary. I see that I can stand it."

Two months later he loses a lump of flesh saving a 19-year-old widow from a stampeding horse. She nurses him, falls in love with him but he rejects her explaining his devotion to the people precludes love ("I must suppress love in my heart; to love you would tie my hands. Even as it is, they cannot be free so soon, for they are already tied. But I shall untie them; I must not love.")

He tours Europe and North America. He is rumoured to have met the founder of a new German school of philosophy (possibly Karl Marx or Ludwig Feuerbach). He has decidedly modern views on suicide, only understanding it if it is to escape a painful illness.

== Impact ==
Rakhmetov was variously regarded as a saint, holy fool or just an eccentric. He inspired the founders of Russian Nihilism and Bolshevism. Sergei Nechayev copied Rakhmetov by sleeping on a wooden bed and living on black bread, while Nikolai Ishutin copied the character's boat hauling feats. According to Orlando Figes, Vladimir Lenin imitated Rakhmetov with daily weight lifting and "Spartan lifestyle."

Rakhmetov's references to Isaac Newton's prediction of an 1866 apocalypse may have inspired Dmitry Karakozov's attempt to assassinate Alexander II in that year.

Anarchist Alexander Berkman used Rakhmetov as a pseudonym when he prepared to assassinate Henry Clay Frick in 1892.

== See also ==
- Catechism of a Revolutionary
