= Todos =

Todos may refer to:

- Everybody (political party) (Spanish: Todos), a Chilean political party
- Todos (architect), Armenian architect of the 6th and 7th centuries
- Todos (political party), a Guatemalan political party
- Todos, a compilation album by Locomotiv GT, 1980

== See also ==
- Todo (disambiguation)
