= Cathedral of Avan =

Cultural heritage monument of Armenia

- Ավանի կաթողիկե
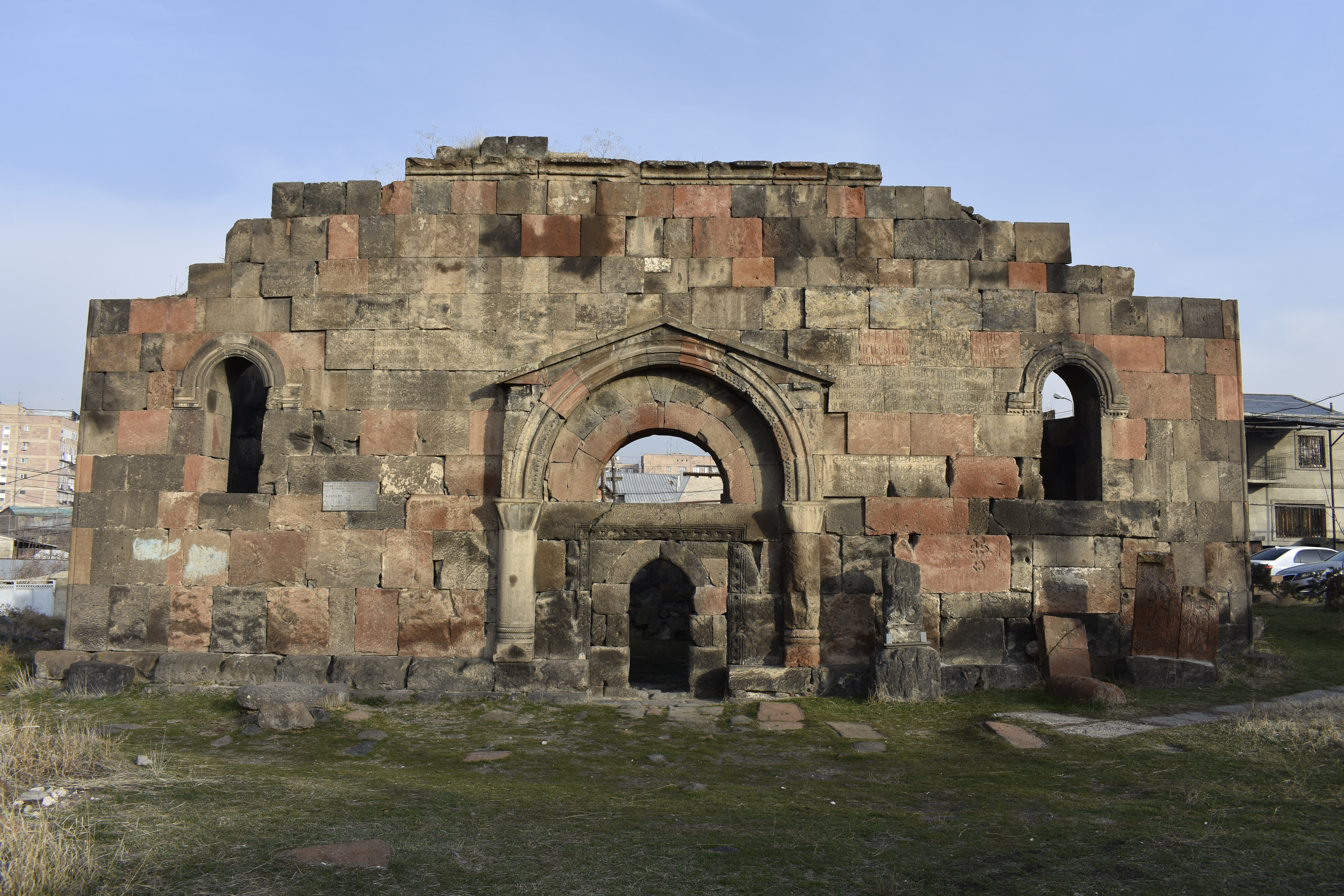
- The intact western facade

- Location within Armenia

Religion
- Affiliation: Armenian Apostolic Church

Location
- Location: Avan District, Yerevan, Armenia
- Coordinates: 40.215048°N 44.571965°E

Architecture
- Type: Radiating (Hripsime); Inner octagon with cylindrical niches
- Style: Armenian
- Completed: 6th century
- Domes: Thought to have had 5 (a single larger dome in the center, and 4 cupolas at each corner).

The Cathedral of Avan (Armenian: Ավանի կաթողիկե, romanized: Avani kat′oghike) is a ruined late 6th-century church located in the Avan District of Yerevan, the capital of Armenia. It is the oldest surviving church inside Yerevan's city limits, and earliest dated example of tetraconch church.

== History ==
The church was built by Todosak in the late 6th century, between the years 591 and 602. The construction began soon after the conclusion of the long Byzantine–Sasanian War of 572–591, that resulted in expansion of direct Byzantine rule over all western regions of Armenia, as far as Avan. In order to strengthen political control over newly conquered regions, emperor Maurice (r. 582–602) decided to support the pro-Chalcedonian fraction of the Armenian Church. In 593, a regional council of western Armenian bishops was convened in Theodosiopolis, which proclaimed allegiance to the Chalcedonian Definition. The council elected John of Bagaran, as new Catholicos of Chalcedonian Armenians. Since the headquarters of his rival, the pro-Persian Catholicos Moses II (574–604) was located in Dvin, the newly elected pro-Byzantine Catholicos John decided to place his headquarters in Byzantine-controlled Avan.

The new complex in Avan included the cathedral and several other buildings. Adjacent to the church on the north side are the foundations of the palatial residence of the Catholicos, thought to have been constructed before the church around the years 581–582. According to the 7th-century Armenian historian Sebeos, both structures were built under the Catholicos's supervision. The church is believed to have been dedicated to the Apostles. In the year 602, the Persian King Khosrov II seized Avan and, having abolished the Catholicosate of Avan, transformed the complex into a monastery.

== Architecture ==
The cathedral, which would later be renamed Surb Hovhannes, was constructed upon the site of previous structures. Numerous ornamented stones found during excavations predominantly on the western side of the building confirm this notion. The remains of the structure sit on a two-stepped platform, while the church's vaults, domes, and roof are missing as well as portions of the upper walls. Architectural historian Toros Toramanian believed that the current roofless church once had five domes: a single larger dome in the center and four smaller cupolas over each corner of the church, above the circular corner chambers. If correct, Avan would be the first such example of a church with five cupolas. The church is quatrefoil in plan, with an octagonal central bay originally with a dome above. There are four semi-circular apses, and four three-quarter circle diagonal niches leading to circular chambers in the corners of the church. The circular shape of the side-chapels gives the church its unique design.

The front (west) façade has lengthy inscriptions on either side of the entry upon the top third of the building, and also on the lintel above the front door there is a short inscription. The name 'Yohan' can be found written within one of the inscriptions, possibly as an earlier style of the name of Hovhannes, but thought not to be of any reference to the Catholicos. A low arched doorway leads into the church from the western wall and is surrounded by an ornamented casing, three-quartered pillars, topped with capitals and lunettes. A vishap stone was used in the interior as the lintel above the main portal. At the north wall is another doorway thought to have been constructed at a later time, after the church was built, to lead to the palace of the Catholicos. Aside from the reasons previously mentioned, the church of S. Hovhannes is important architecturally because it is thought to have been a prototype of Saint Hripsime Church completed later in the year 618. Conservation work was done to the church in 1940-1941, and again in 1956-1966, and 1968.

== Gallery ==
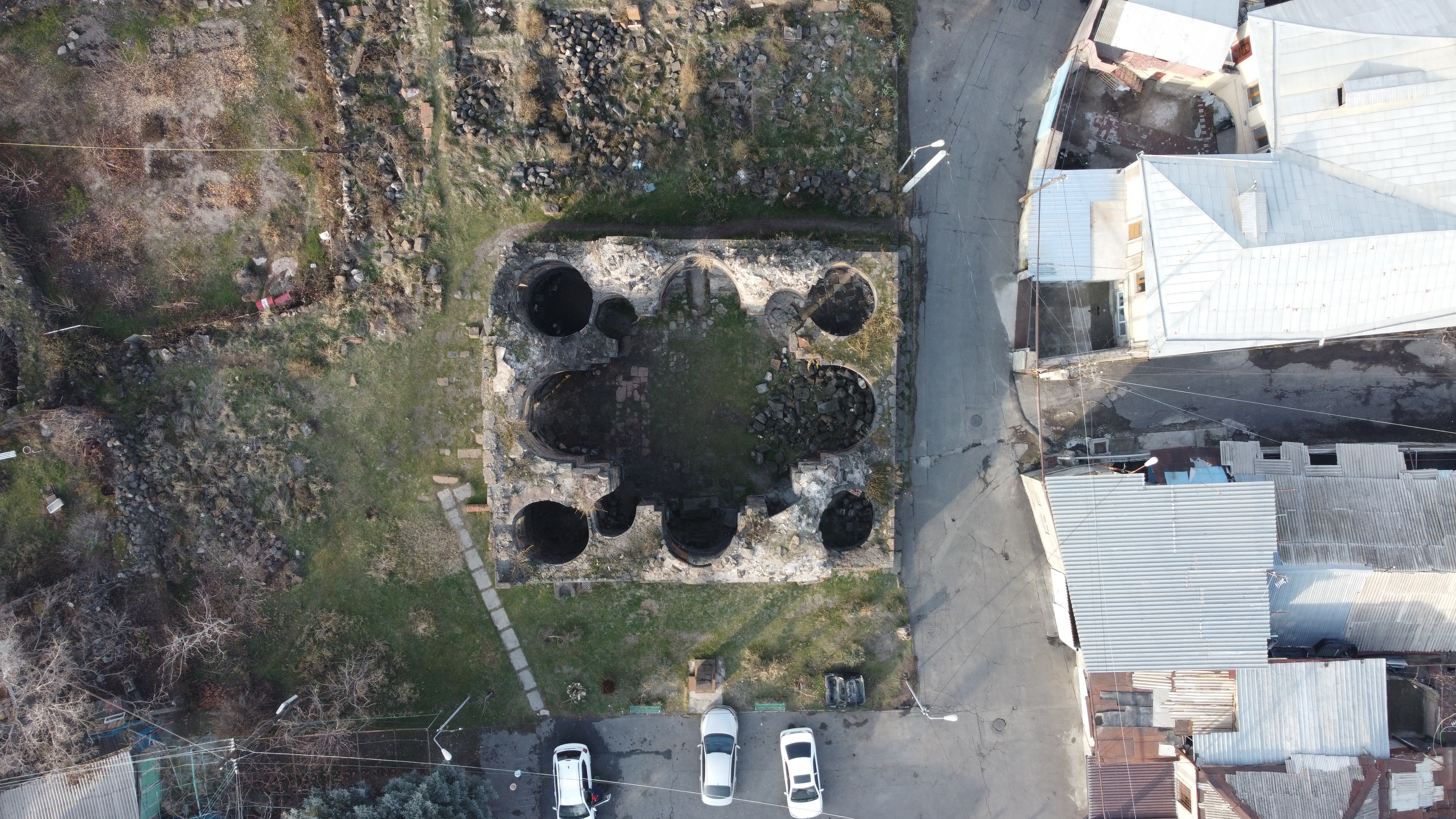
An aerial view

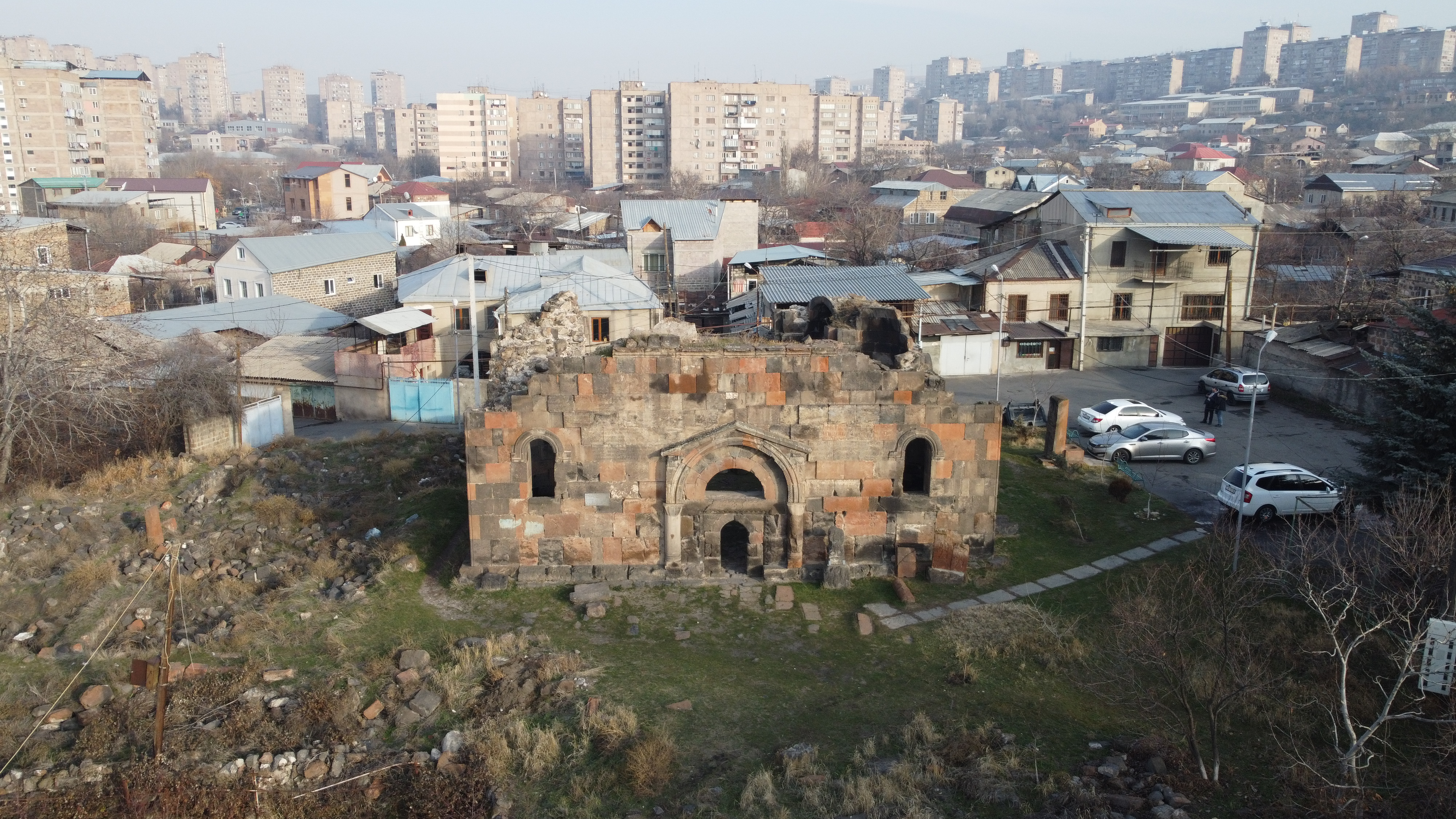

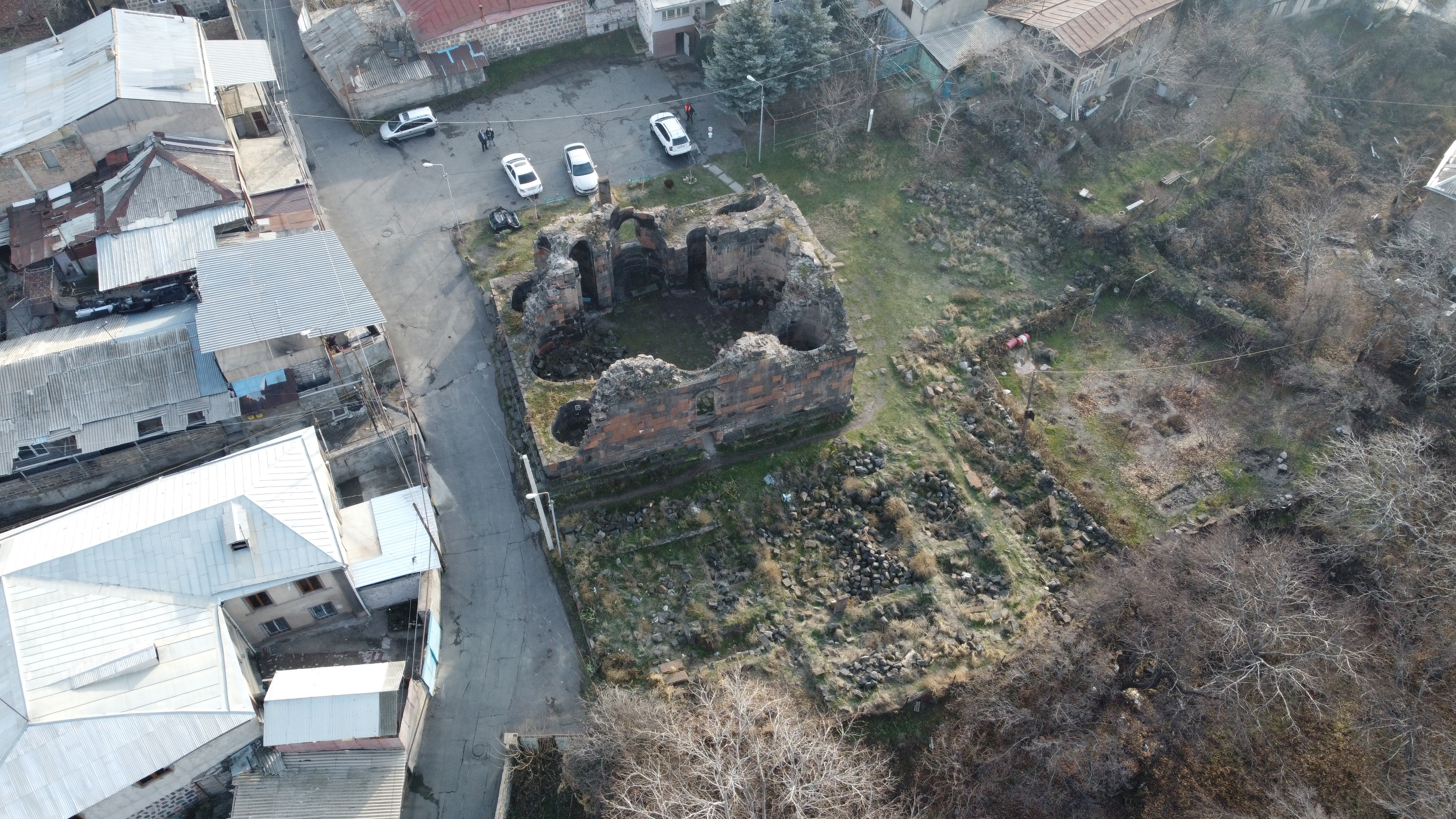

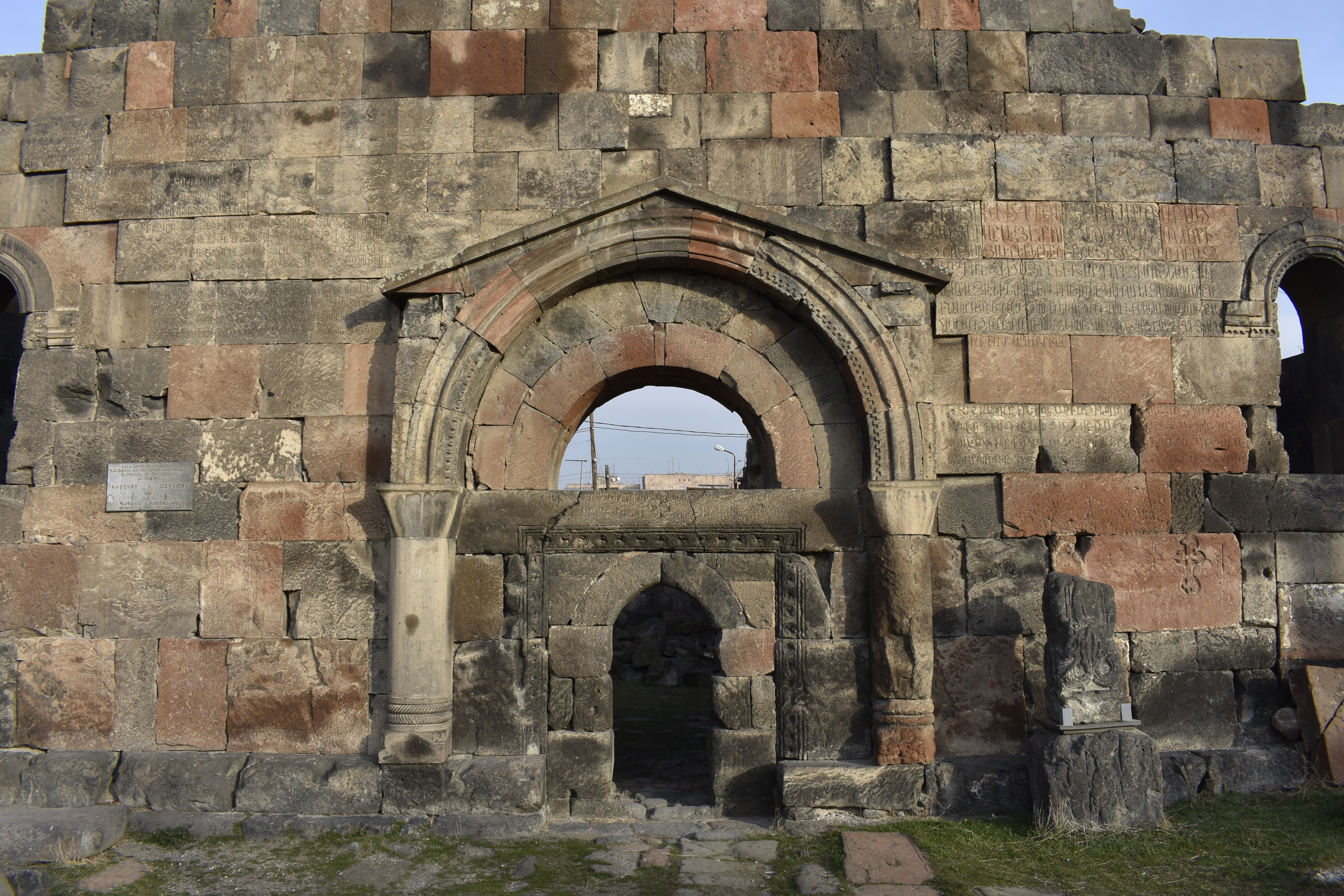
The decorated portal

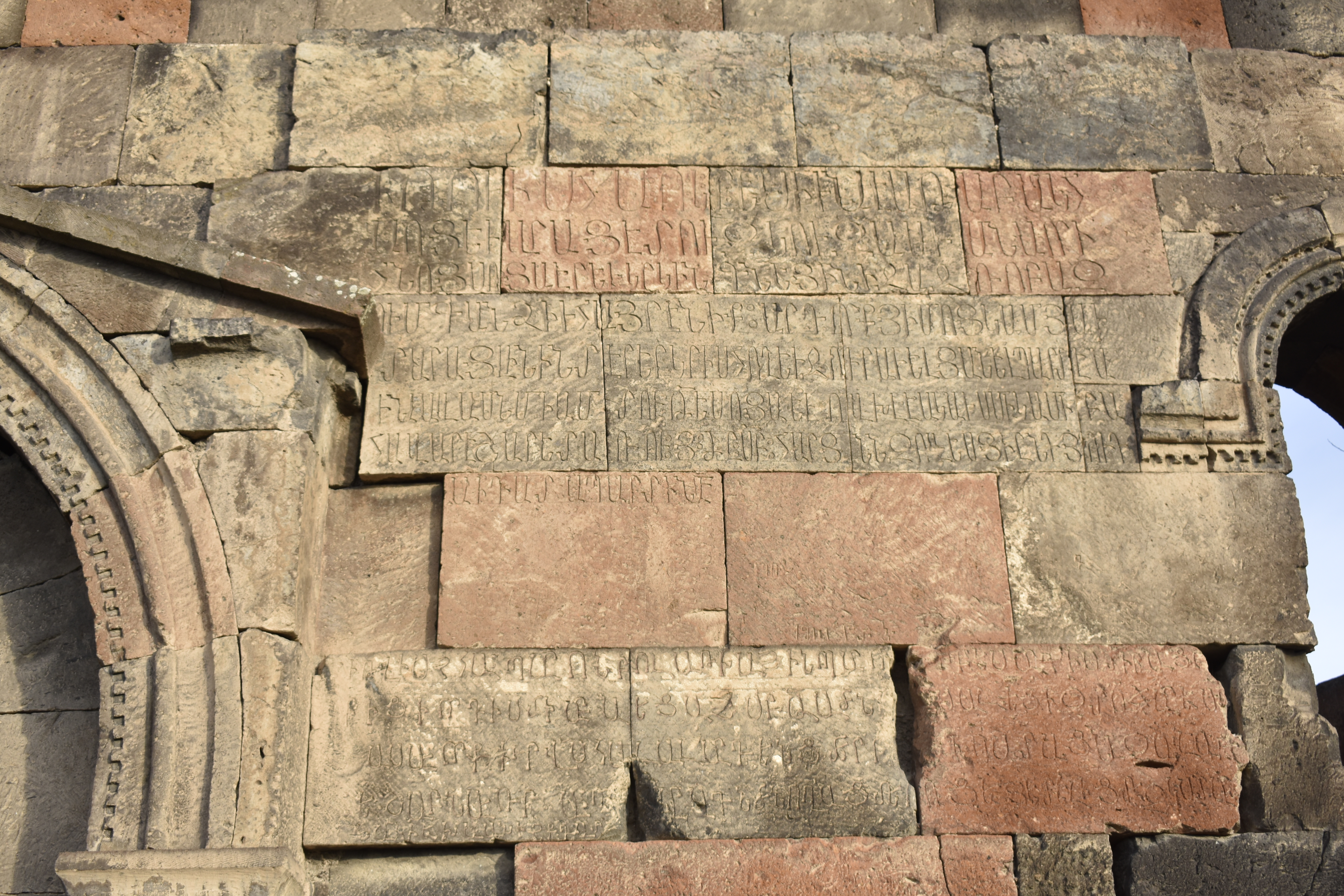
Inscriptions

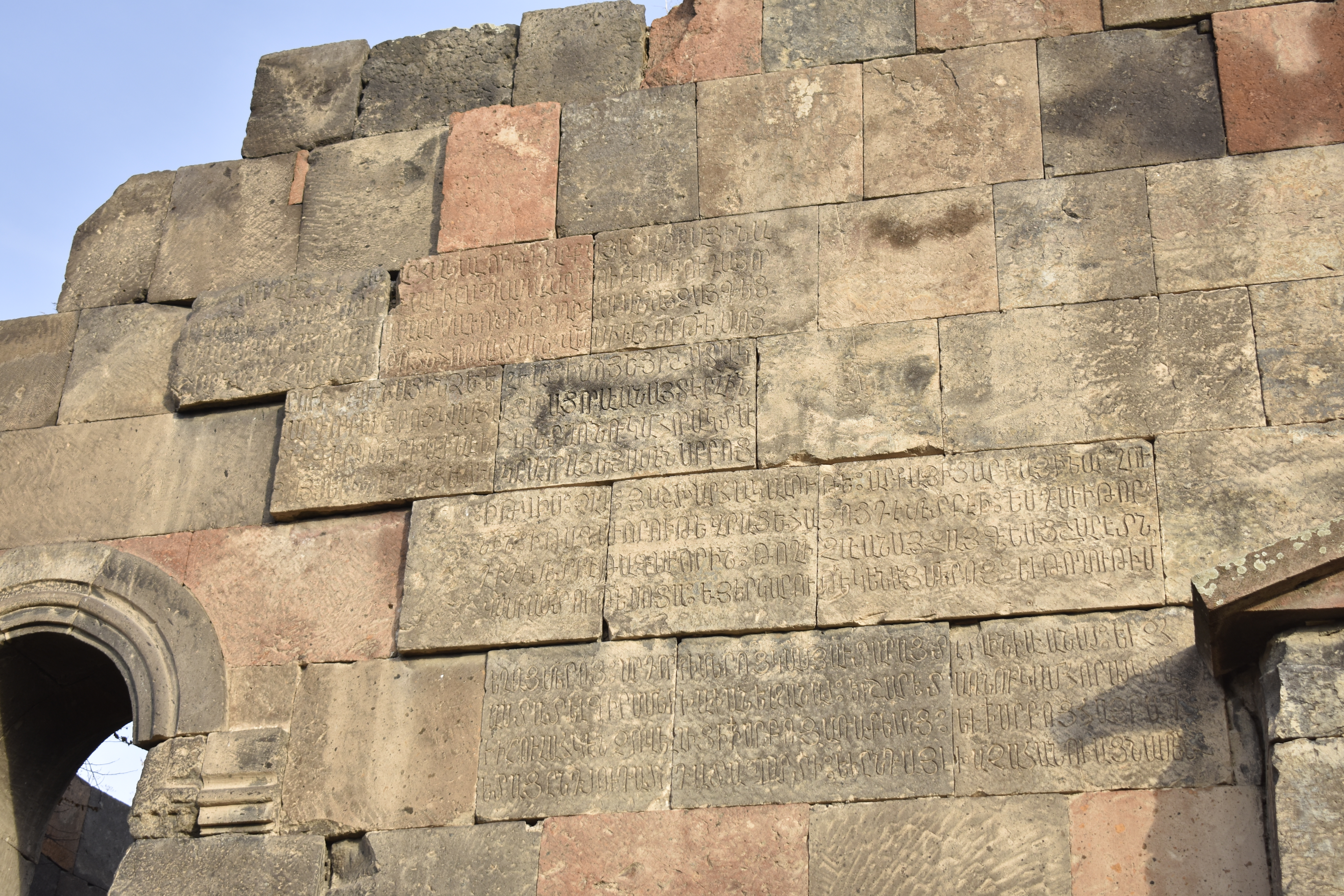

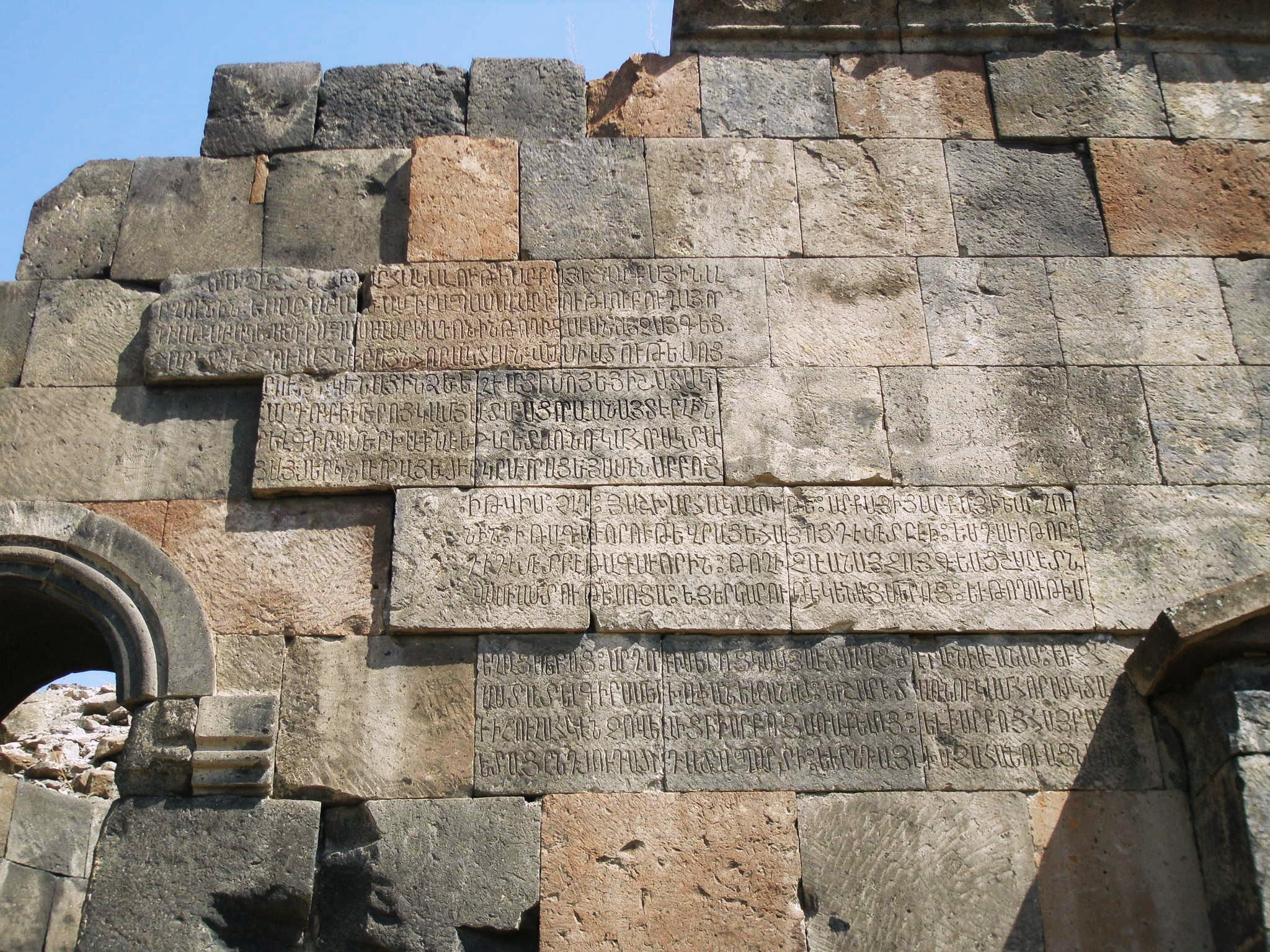
Inscriptions found upon the western exterior façade of the church (left of the door).

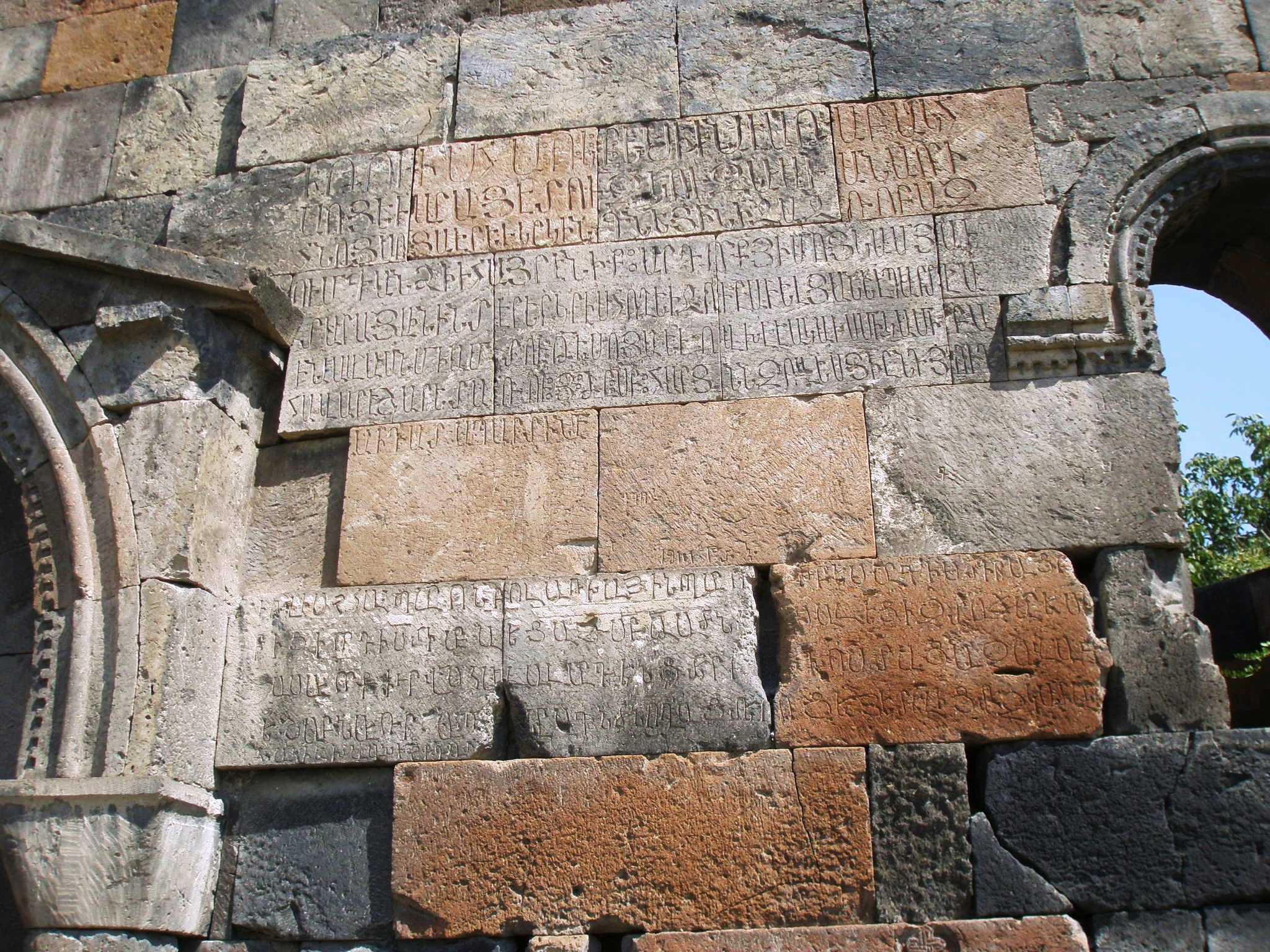
Inscriptions found upon the western exterior façade of the church (right of the door).

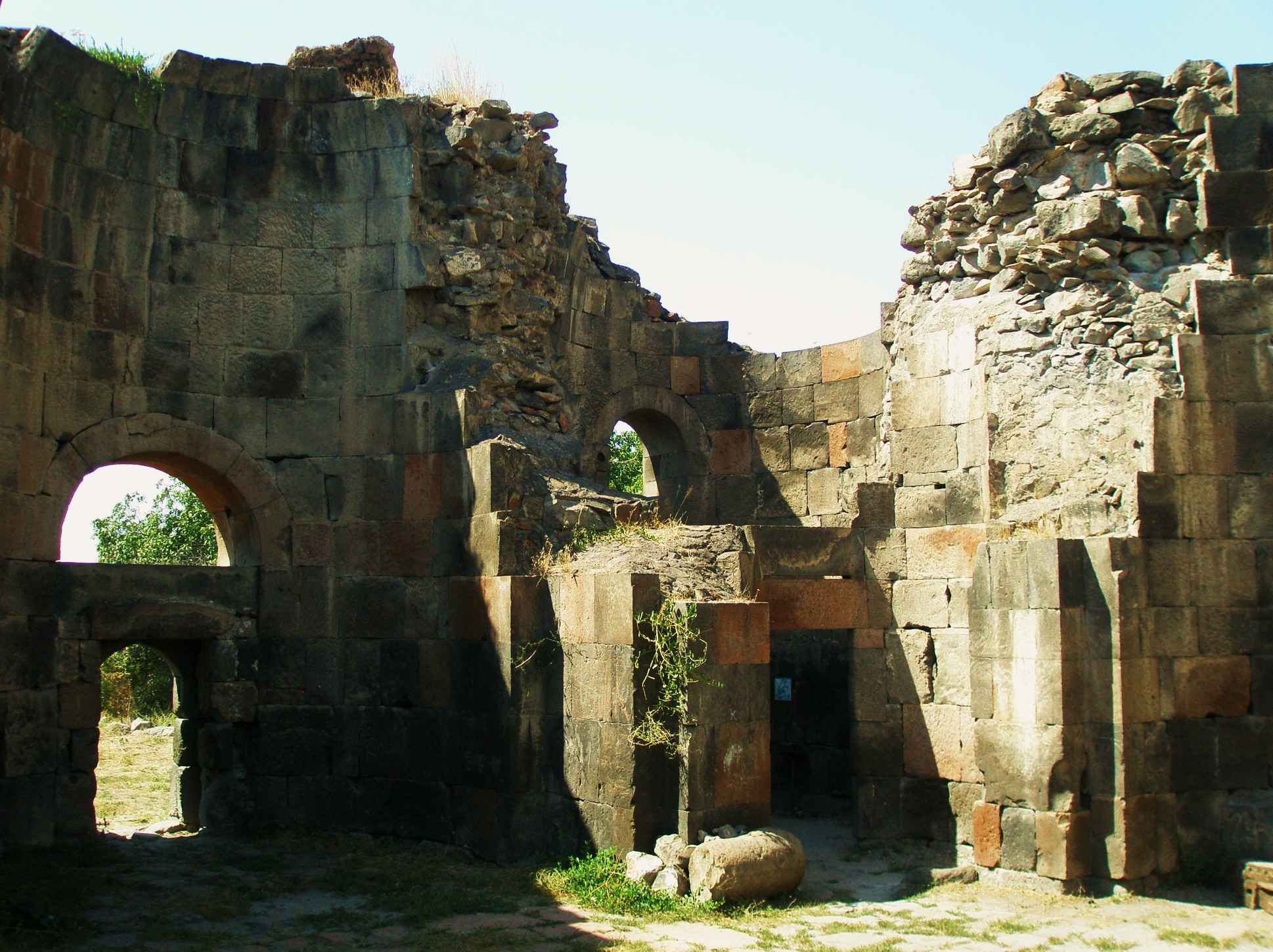
Interior remnants

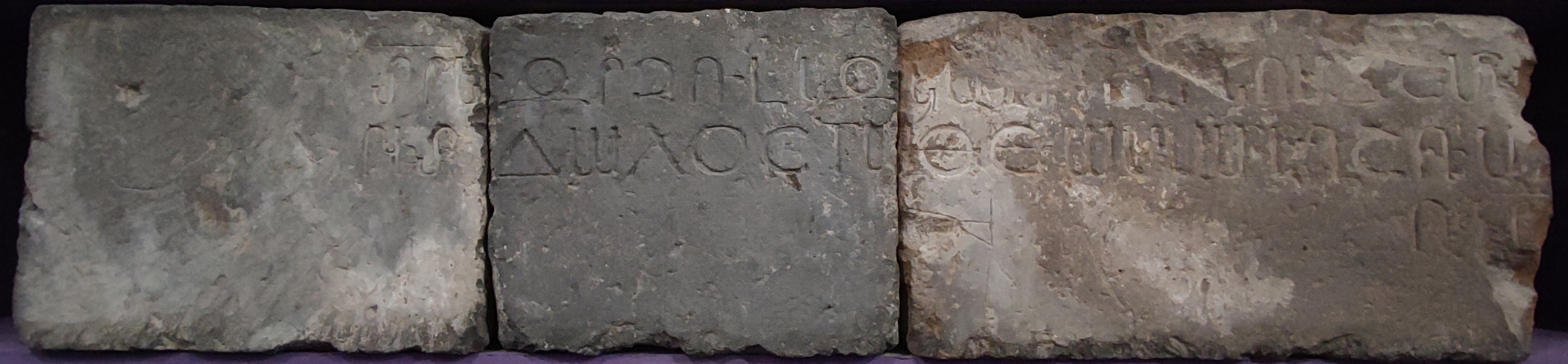
Bilingual Armenian-Greek inscription now kept at the History Museum of Armenia

== Sources ==
- Donabédian, Patrick (2023). "Culmination of a late antique legacy? The Golden age of Armenian architecture in the seventh century". CONVIVIUM Supplementum. Brepols: 24–41. ISSN 2336-3452. (archived PDF)
- Kazaryan, A. Yu. (2009). 'Новый Иерусалим' в пространственных концепциях и архитектурных формах средневековой Армении ["New Jerusalem" in Spatial Concepts and Architectural Forms of Medieval Armenia]. In Lidov, A. M. (ed.). Новые Иерусалимы : Иеротопия и иконография сакральных пространств [New Jerusalems: Hierotopy and Iconography of Sacred Spaces] (in Russian). Moscow: Indrik. p. 520-543. ISBN 978-5-91674-051-6.
- Marutyan, Tiran [in Armenian] (1976). Ավանի տաճարը և համանման հուշարձանները [Avan Cathedral and Similar Monuments] (PDF) (in Armenian). Yerevan: Hayastan. Archived from the original (PDF) on 20 February 2024.
- Meyendorff, John (1989). Imperial Unity and Christian Divisions: The Church 450-680 A.D. The Church in history. Vol. 2. Crestwood, NY: St. Vladimir's Seminary Press. ISBN 978-0-88141-056-3.
