= Avan District =

District in Yerevan, Armenia

Avan Ավան
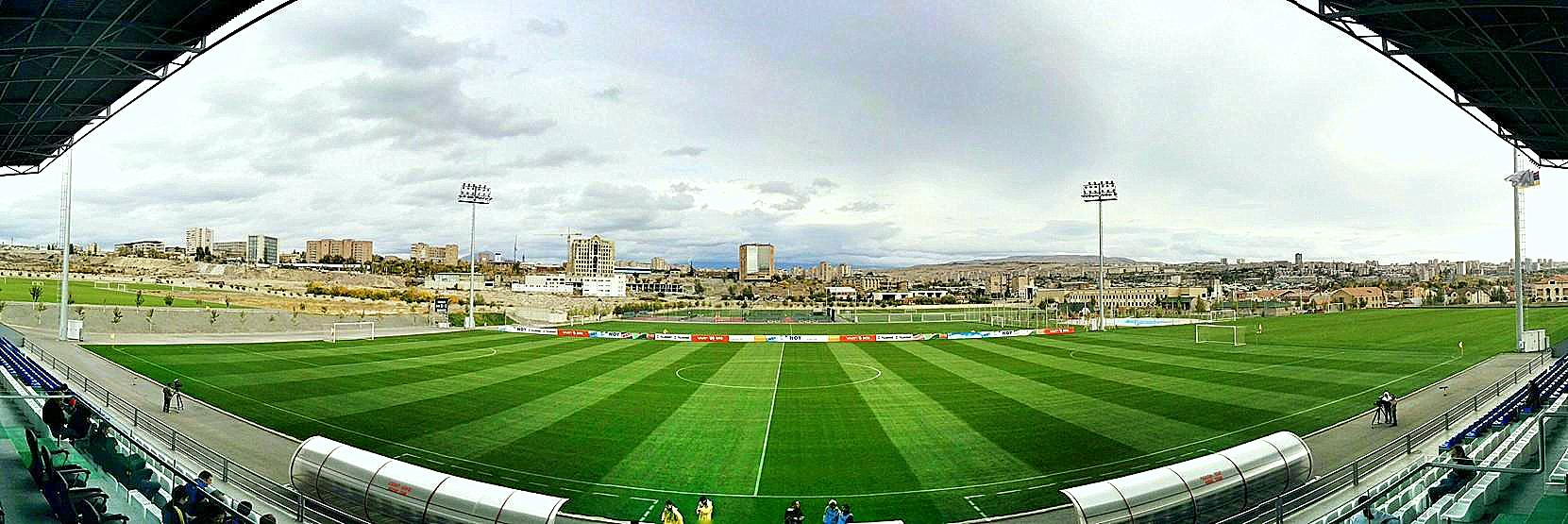
- Panoramic view of Avan District from the Yerevan Football Academy

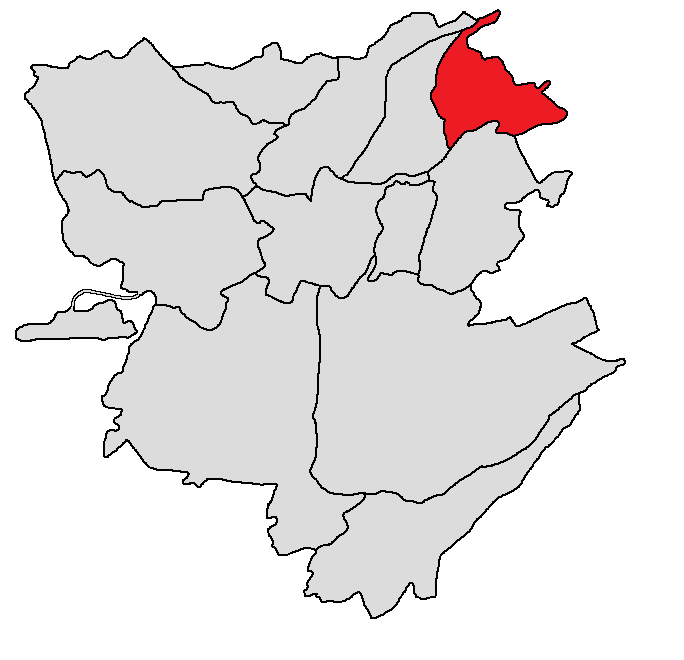
- Avan district shown in red
- Coordinates: 40°12′54″N 44°34′43″E
- Country: Armenia
- Marz (Province): Yerevan

Area
  - Total: 7.26 km^{2} (2.80 sq mi)
- Elevation: 1,275 m (4,183 ft)

Population (2022 census)
  - Total: 55,094
  - Density: 7,590/km^{2} (19,700/sq mi)
- Time zone: UTC+4 (AMT)

Avan (Armenian: Ավան վարչական շրջան, romanized: Avan varch’akan shrjan) is one of the 12 districts of Yerevan, the capital of Armenia. Originally an ancient village on a hill at the northeastern outskirts of Yerevan, Avan has been inhabited since pre-Christian times. In the 20th century, during the Soviet period, the village was incorporated into the capital Yerevan. According to the 2022 census, Avan has a population of 55,094. Avan is home to the oldest preserved church in Yerevan, the Katoghike Tsiranavor Church, which dates back to the late 6th century.

== Location ==
Avan is located on the hills north of the Nor Nork District and east of Kanaker. Avan has common borders with the districts of Arabkir and Kanaker-Zeytun from the east and the district of Nor Nork from the south. It is bordered by the Kotayk Province from the north and west. The district has an altitude ranging between 1250 and 1300 meters, which is almost 250 meters higher than the centre of Yerevan.

The district is unofficially divided into smaller neighborhoods such as Avan blocks, Avan-Arinj and Aghi Hank.

Due to its location at a higher area, Avan is known among the districts of Yerevan for its clean atmosphere.

== History ==
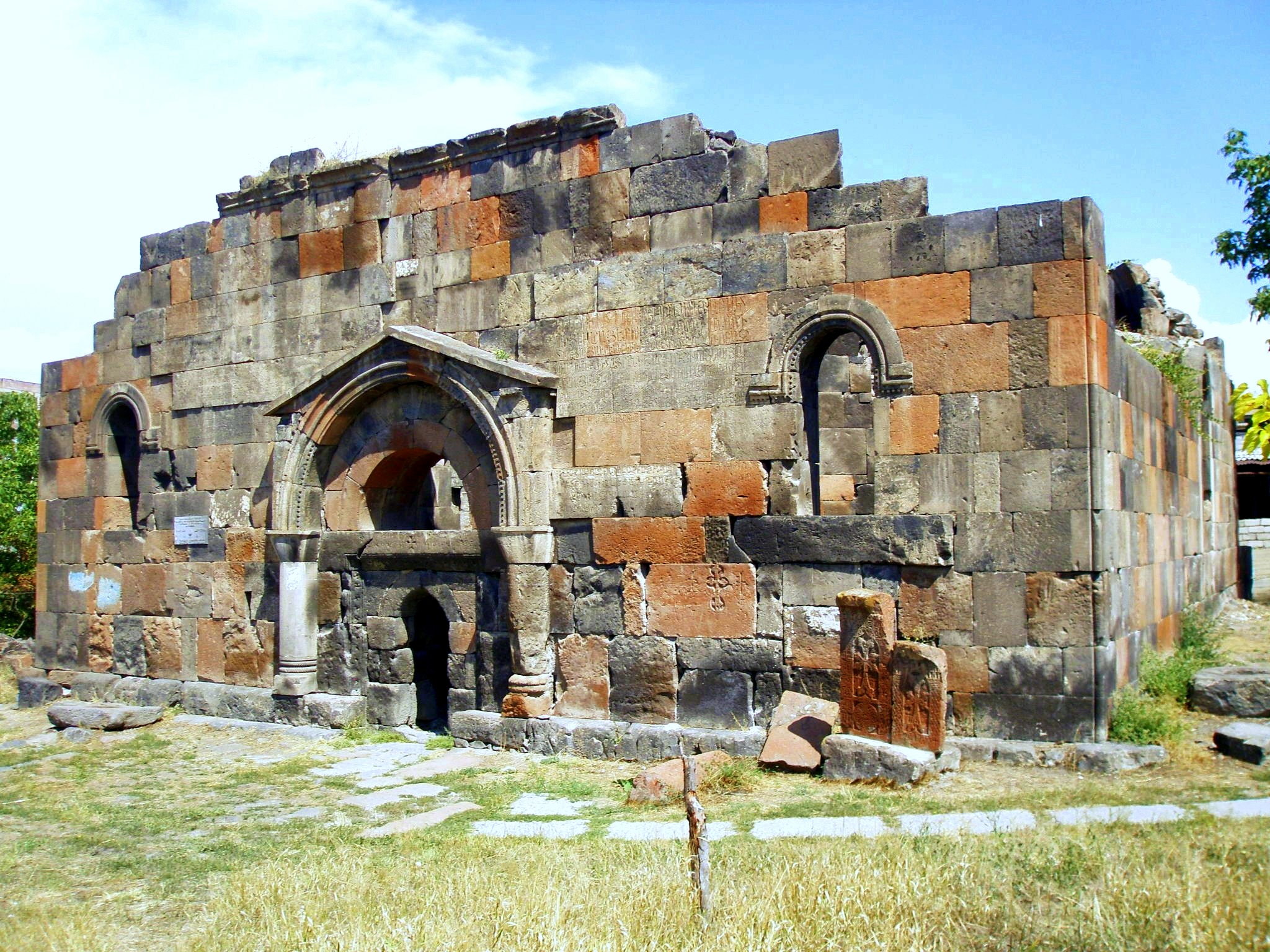
Katoghike Tsiranavor Church

After the Second Synod of Dvin of the Armenian Apostolic Church in 554, the Armenian Church reaffirmed its rejection of the Chalcedonian Definition, causing controversy between the Miaphysitists and the pro-Byzantine clerics within the Armenian Church. According to the 7th-century Armenian historian Sebeos, the Eastern Orthodox Church appointed the pro-Byzantine Armenian cleric John of Bagavan as an anti-Catholicos of the Armenian Church. In 591, John of Bagavan built the Holy Mother of God Katoghike Tsiranavor Church in Avan village as the seat of his unrecognized Catholicosate. The large cemetery of the church contains many khachkars from the 13th to 18th centuries. Adjacent to it across the street is a stepped plinth and broken funerary pillar monument from the 5th or 6th century. A worn inscription may be found along the landings of the second and third steps. The many inscriptions in the Greek and Georgian languages on the church façade, dating back to the 7th and the 13th centuries respectively, suggest that the Avan was still the centre of the breakaway of pro-Byzantine Armenian Church. Avan was severely damaged during the devastating Yerevan earthquake of 1679.

After the Sovietization of Armenia, the city of Yerevan was entirely remodeled by architect Alexander Tamanian. By the mid-1960s, within the original plan of Tamanian, new cheaper Soviet apartment blocks with more than five stories were constructed at the outskirts of Yerevan, including the districts of Avan and Nor Nork. As a result of the expansion of the capital city, Avan was eventually absorbed by Yerevan.

== Streets and landmarks ==
=== Main streets ===
- Hrachya Acharyan Street
- Nver Safaryan Street
- Marshal Sergei Khudyakov Street
- Marshal Babajanian Street
- Yevgeny Vakhtangov Street
- Dushanbe Street
- Almaty Street

=== Historic landmarks ===
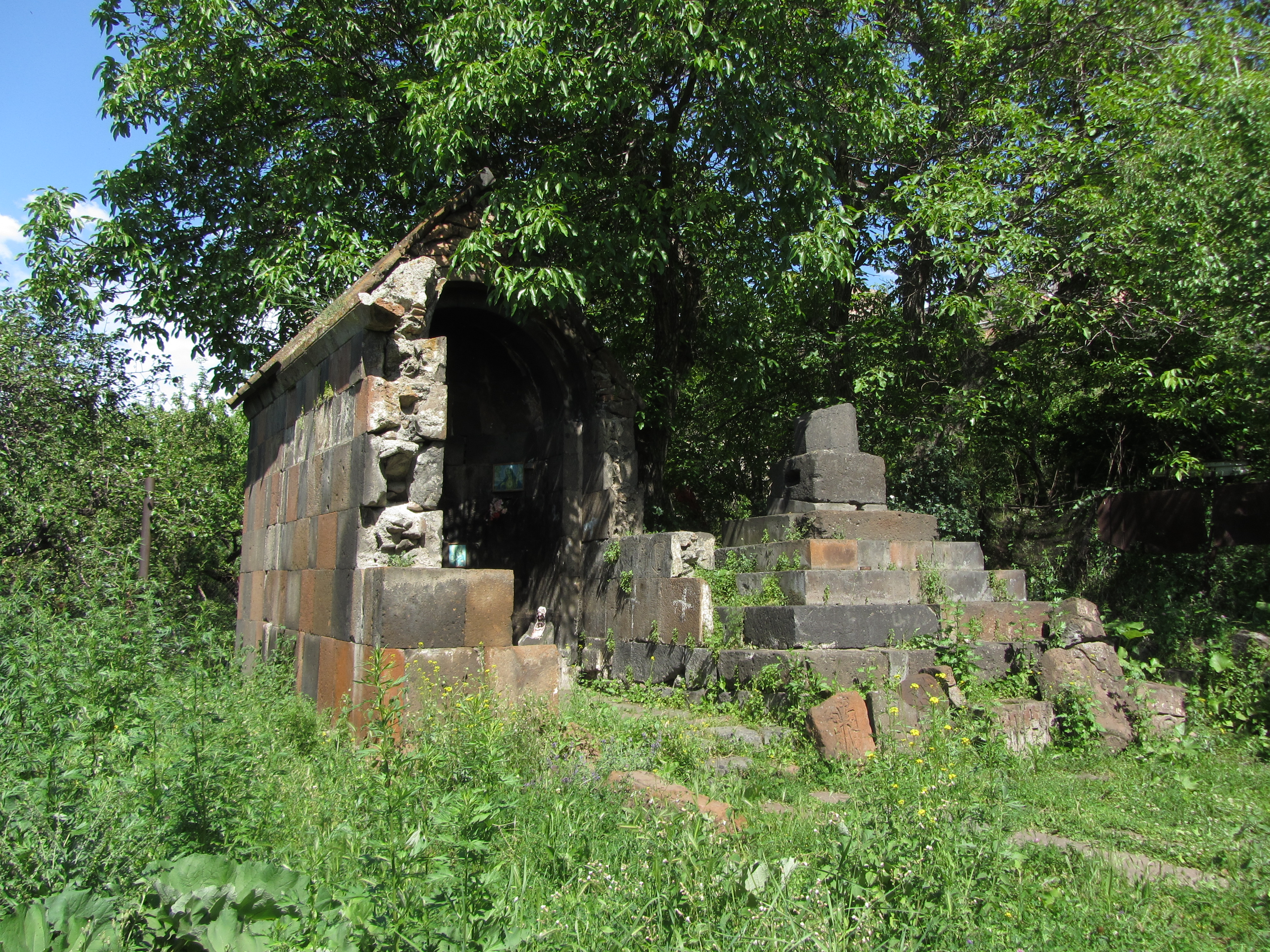
The remains of the Holy Mother of God Chapel of Avan, 4th century

- Holy Mother of God Chapel of Avan, dating back to the 4th century, partly ruined.
- Surp Hovhannes Chapel of Avan, 5th century, partly ruined.
- Katoghike Tsiranavor Church of Avan, 6th century, partly ruined.
- Holy Mother of God Church, Avan, opened in 2002.
- Stepped plinth and broken funerary pillar monument, 5th to 6th centuries, near the main cemetery in Avan along Nver Safaryan street.

=== Recreation ===
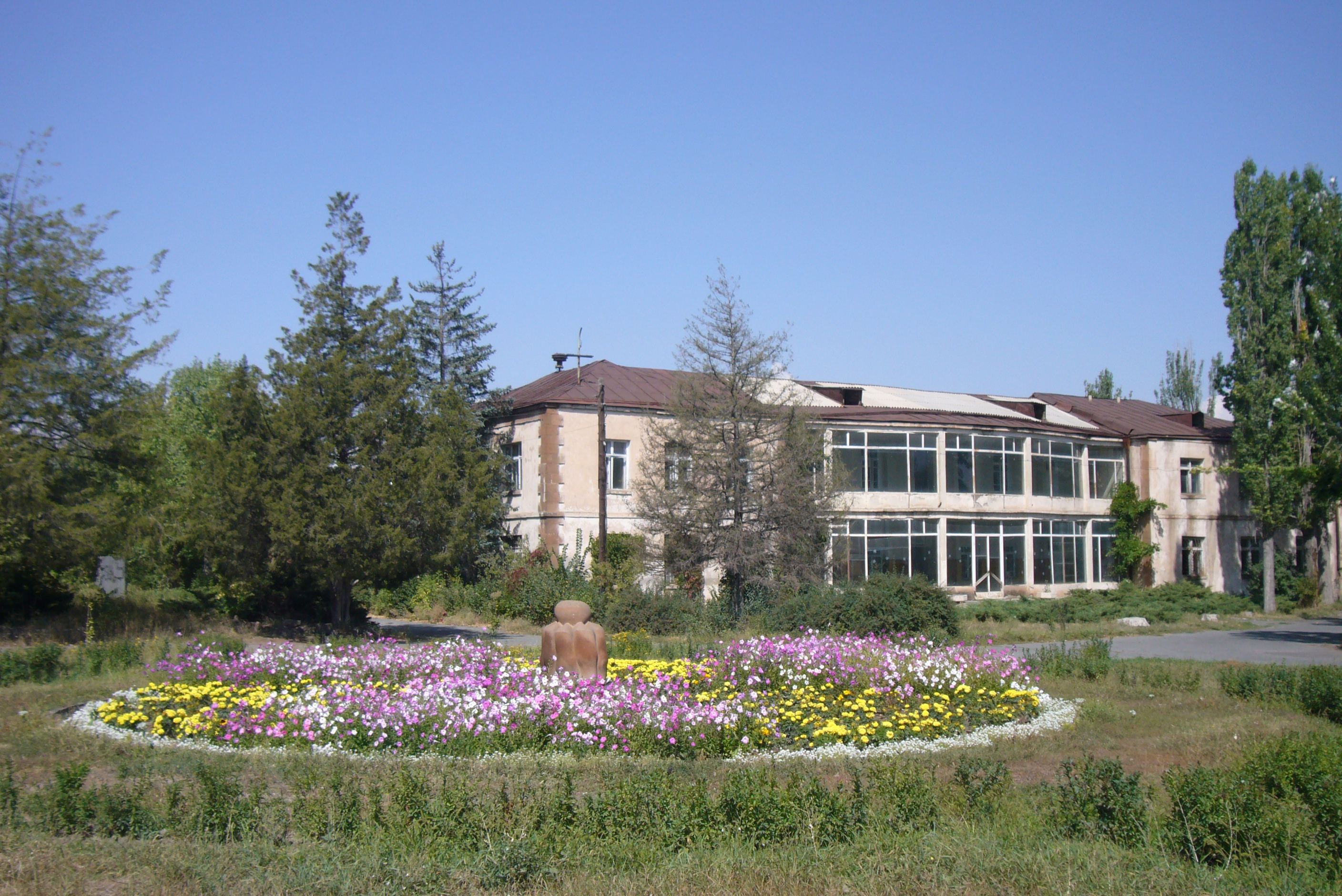
Yerevan Botanical Garden

- Yerevan Botanical Garden
- Avan Park
- Family Park
- Yerevan Football Academy of the Football Federation of Armenia: home to 9 regular-sized football pitches, 4 tennis courts, indoor sports hall (for futsal, basketball, handball and volleyball), indoor and outdoor swimming pools, fitness centre, hotel and restaurant
- Yerevan Football Academy Stadium
- Play City amusement park

=== Education and technology ===
- Crisis Management State Academy
- CANDLE Synchrotron Research Institute

== Gallery ==
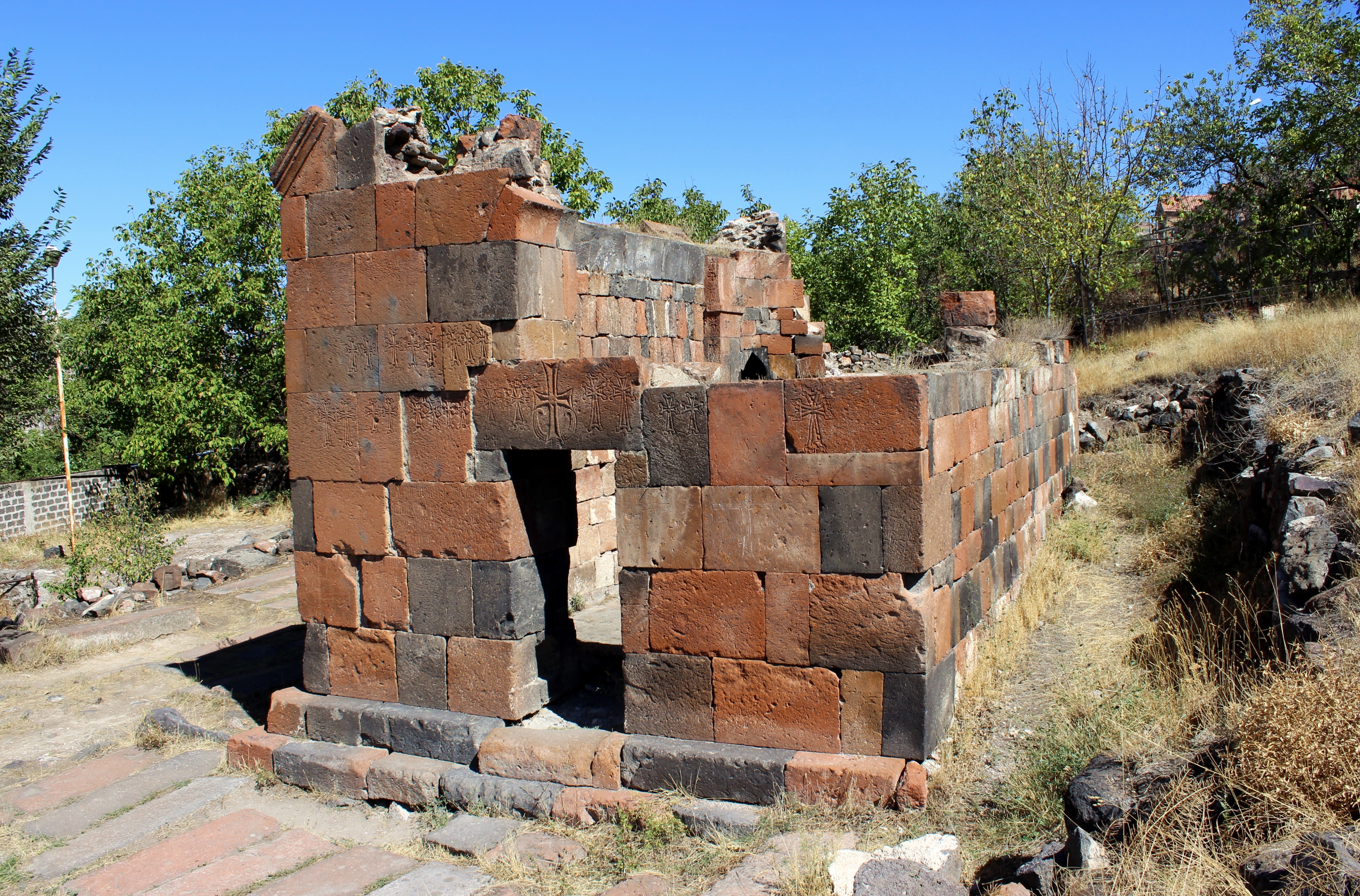
Surp Hovhannes Chapel, 5th century (12th-13th century)

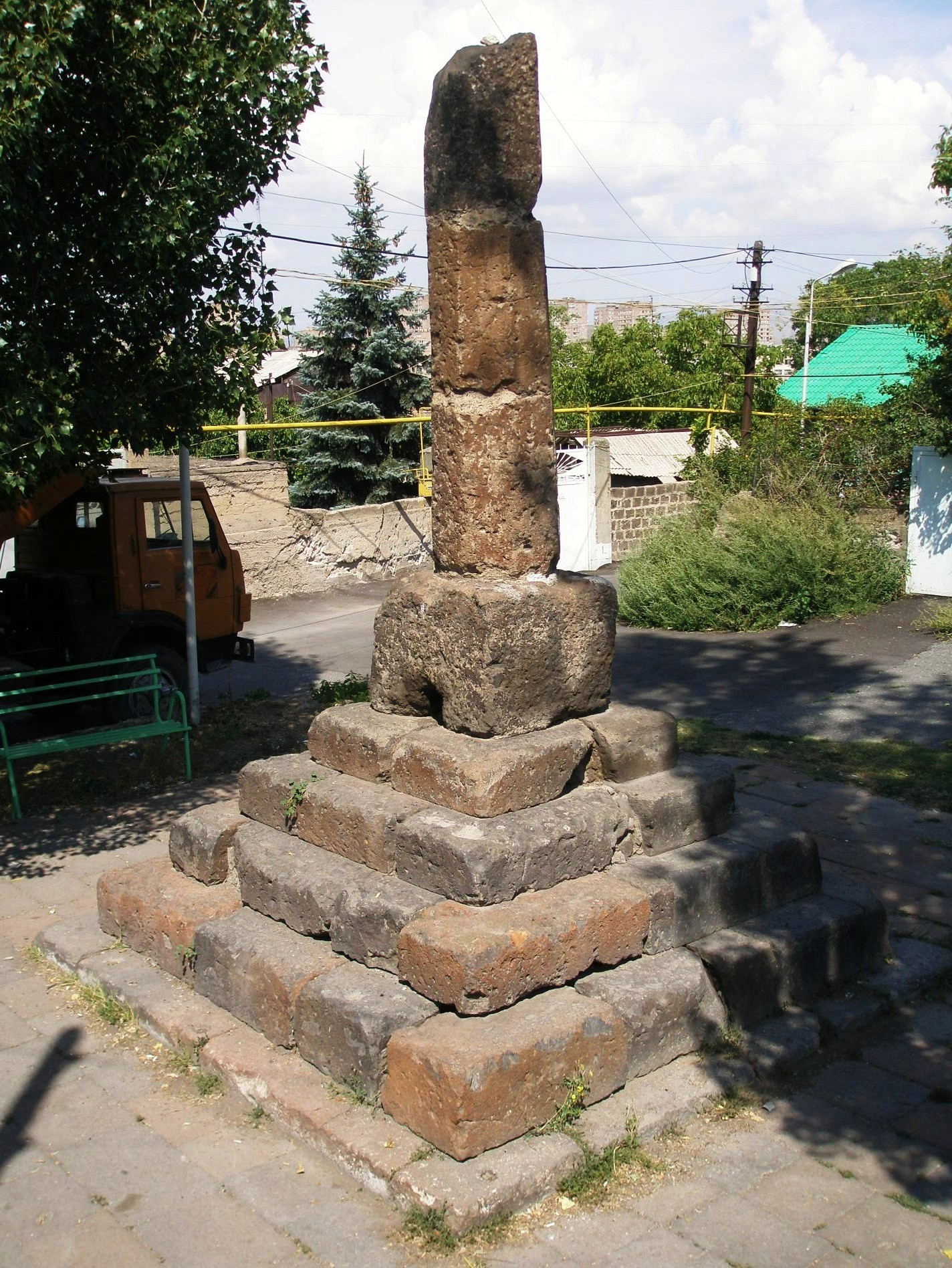
Stepped plinth and broken funerary pillar monument, 5th to 6th centuries

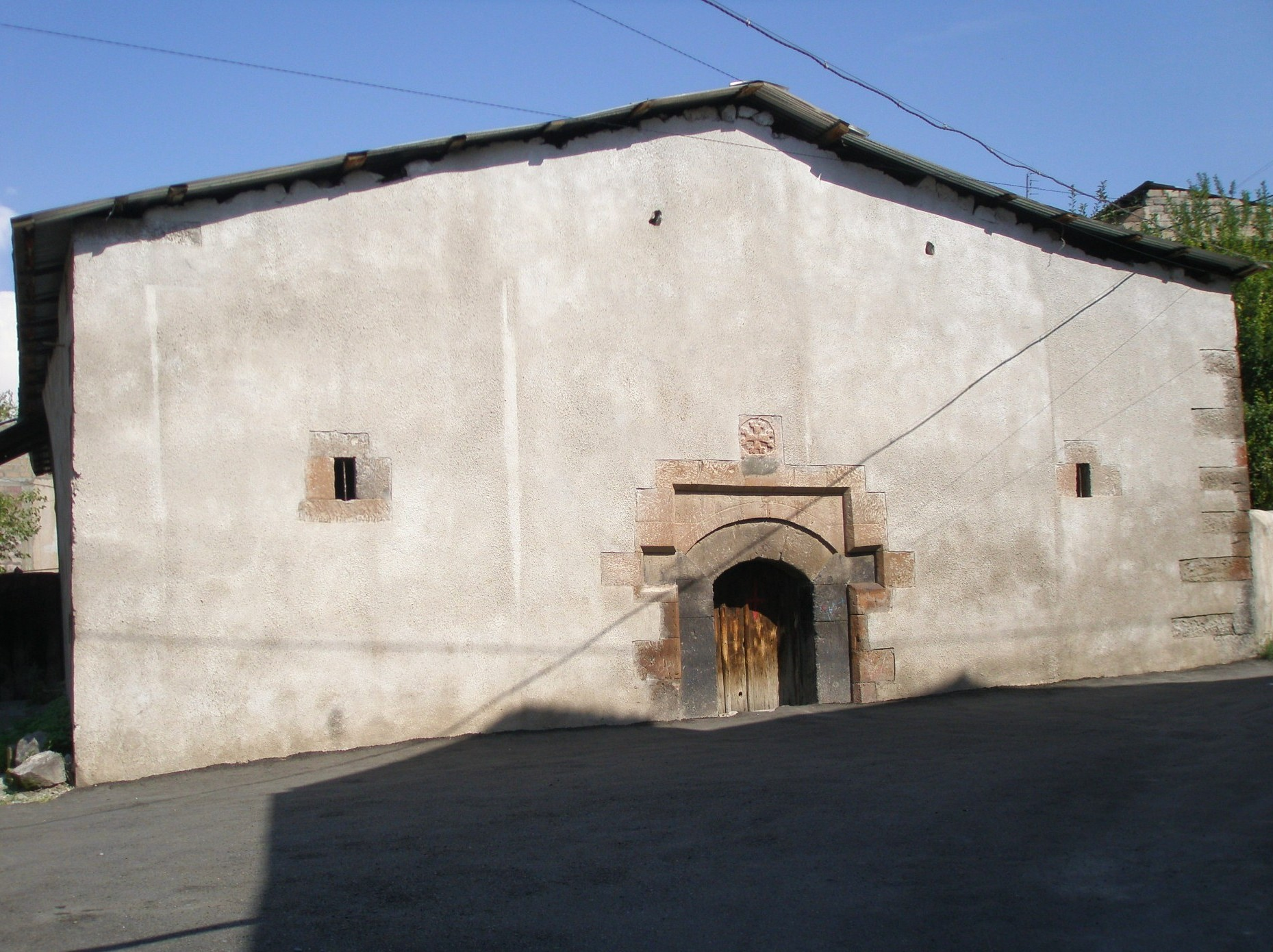
Holy Mother of God Parochial Church of Avan (19th century)

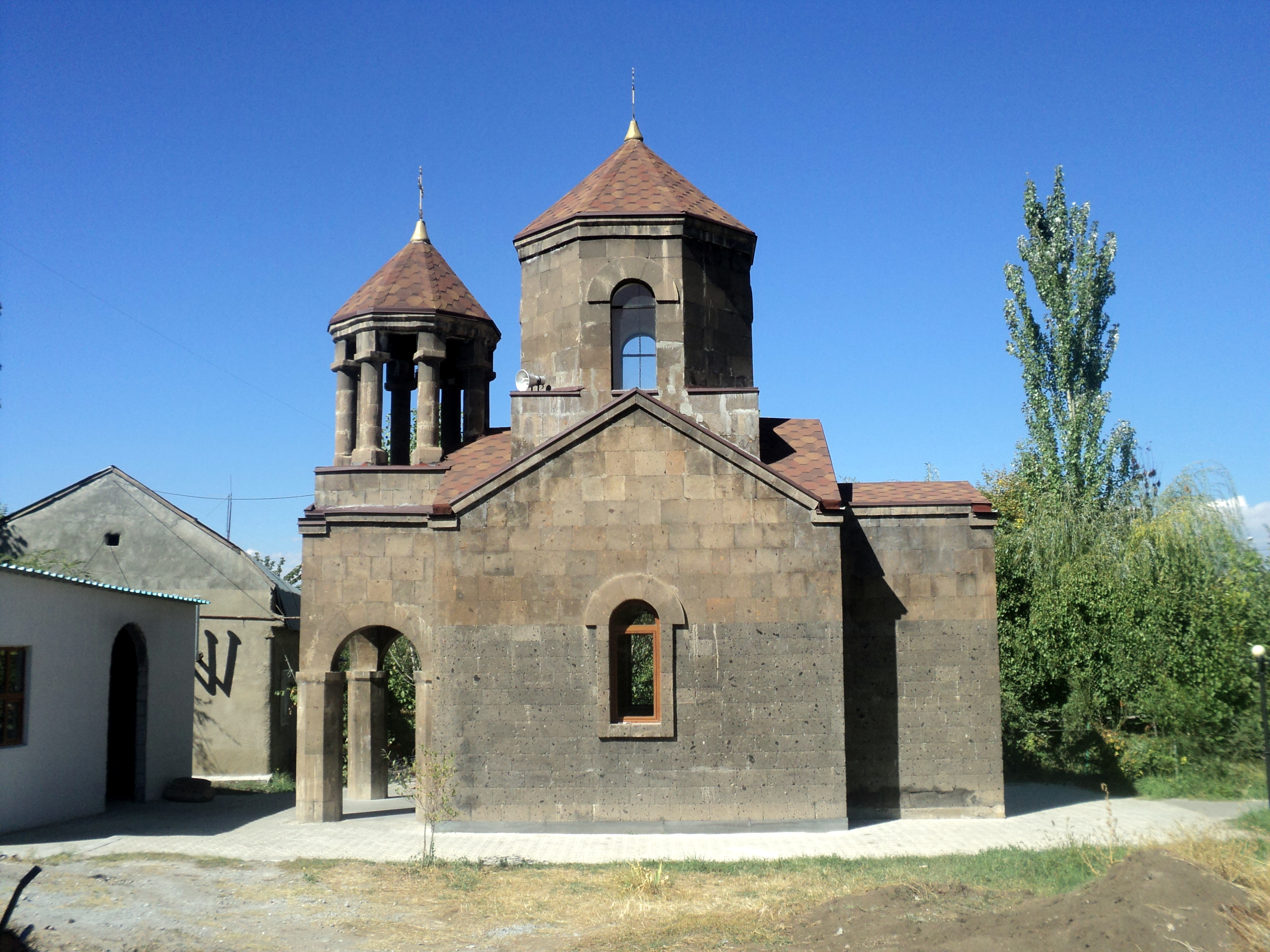
Holy Mother of God Chapel of Avan built in 2002
