= Todo =

Todo may refer to:

- Todo Bichig, Kalmyk ‘Clear Script’
- To-do list, a time management implementation
- TODO (tag), a computer programming comment tag
- Todo (album), eighteenth studio album by Juan Gabriel, released in 1983

Tōdō may refer to:

- Tōkyūjutsu (淘宮術) or Tōdō (淘道), a Japanese divination (fortune telling) method
- Tōdōza (当道座) or Tōdō (当道), a Japanese guild for blind male musicians
- Tōdō Heisuke (藤堂平助, 1844–1867), samurai
- Tōdō Takatora (藤堂高虎, 1556–1630), daimyō
- Tōdō Takayuki (藤堂高猷, 1813–1895), daimyō
- Izumi Todo (東堂いづみ), pseudonym for the staff at Toei Animation

== See also ==
- To do
- Todos (disambiguation)
- Toto (disambiguation)
