= Todos (architect) =

Todos or Todosak (Armenian: Թոդոսակ) was an ancient Armenian architect of the 6th—7th centuries, who built a series of Churches in Armenia and Georgia. Today, little is known about Todos' life.

== Churches ==
- Ateni Sioni Church
- Katoghike Tsiranavor Church of Avan — built in interval from 588 to 597
- Jvari (monastery) — may be built by Todos in interval from 605 to 642
