= What Is to Be Done? (novel) =

1863 novel by Nikolay Chernyshevsky

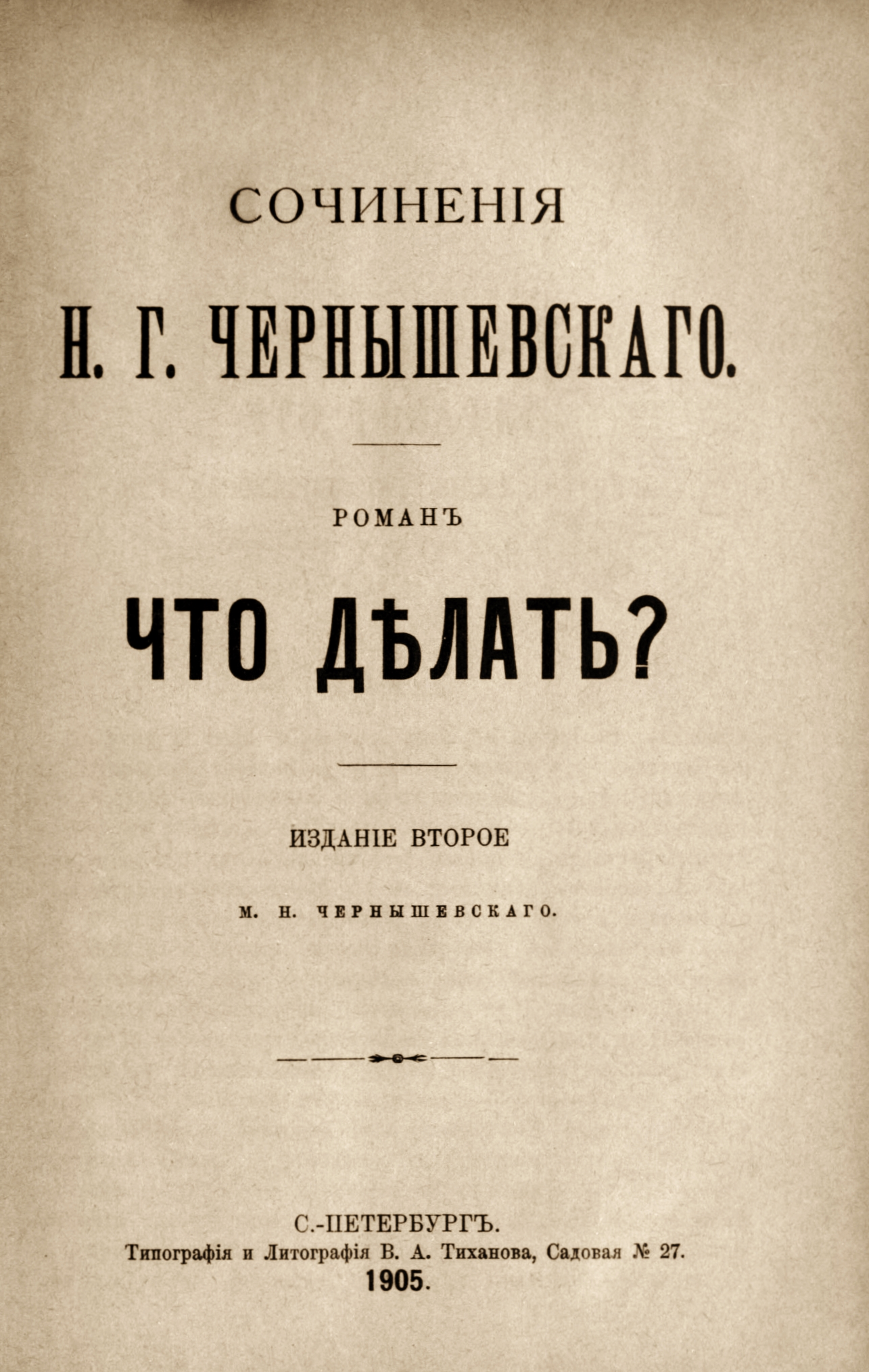
- 1905 title page
- Author: Nikolai Chernyshevsky
- Original title: Что дѣлать?
- Language: Russian
- Genre: Philosophical fiction, political fiction
- Publication date: 1863
- Publication place: Russian Empire
- English publication date: 1886
- Media type: Print (hardback and paperback)

What Is to Be Done? (Russian: Что делать?, romanized: Chto delat'?) is an 1863 novel written by the Russian author Nikolay Chernyshevsky, written in response to Fathers and Sons (1862) by Ivan Turgenev. The chief character is Viéra Pavlovna, a woman who escapes the control of her family and an arranged marriage to seek economic independence.

== Background ==
When he wrote the novel, Chernyshevsky was imprisoned in the Peter and Paul Fortress of Saint Petersburg and was soon to spend years in Siberia. He asked for and received permission to write the novel in prison. The authorities passed the manuscript along to the newspaper Sovremennik, his former employer, which published it in installments.

== Plot ==
What Is to Be Done? begins on July 23, 1856, with an unknown man checking into a hotel in Saint Petersburg near the Moskovsky Railway Station asking for a meal, a bed, and to be awakened in the morning. He then locks the door and is not heard from for the rest of the night. The waiter knocks on the man's door the following day to wake him but gets no response and eventually contacts the police. The policemen finally force the door only to find a room empty except for a note linking the man to Liteyny Bridge.

The police inform the butler that at that bridge, at half past two that morning, a lone gunshot was heard, and it was thought to be a suicide. But no body could be found, leading some to conclude it was a suicide, others a drunkard, and others a practical joker. The story then flashes back to the same morning, in a dacha in the Kamenny Islands (Stone Islands), where the protagonist Viéra Pavlovna is sewing a dress that she plans to wear to her maid, Masha's, wedding.

Masha presents her with a letter that makes Viéra turn pale and weep. A young man enters and reads the letter, which states "I have disturbed your peace of mind. I leave these scenes. Don't grieve; I love you both so much that I am very happy at my decision. Farewell." Viéra accuses the young man of having blood on his hands, then admits that she herself murdered for the sake of the young man. She tells the young man that they must part, and that she will be moving to Tver or Novgorod.

The novel in the main revolves around the life of Viéra Pavlovna Rozalskaïa (often referred to as Viérotchka, Russian for Little Viéra). It begins in the year 1852 with Viéra living on Gorokhovaya Street with her tyrannical mother, Marya Alekséyevna; scheming father, Pavel Konstantinuitch Rozalsky; young brother, Feódor; and the cook, Matrióna. Viéra's parents intend to marry her off to a hedonistic young military officer, Mikhaïl Ivanuitch.

She is saved from this fate when she meets the medical student, Dmitri Sergéitch Lopukhóf, who has been tutoring her younger brother, Feódor. Lopukhóf and Viéra began meeting privately to avoid her mother's suspicion and to discuss Socialism, gender equality, science, and ways to save her from the arranged marriage. Over time they develop feelings for each another, and because of this and of Lopukhóf's desire to save her from what she describes as her "cellar" at home, they risk a lawsuit from Viéra's parents by secretly eloping. They move into an apartment together on Vasilyevsky Island.

Viéra and Lopukhóf intend to live in accordance with their beliefs and draw up a system of elaborate rules, such as not being able to enter each other's sleeping quarters without express permission, so as to give each other the utmost equality, privacy, freedom, and independence. Viéra aspires not only to have economic independence for herself but also to save other young women from the fate she almost faced. She becomes a seamstress and starts a commune of seamstresses with other young women, many of whose stories are related in the novel. The commune evolves to include shared living arrangements, profit-sharing, and classes provided by educated individuals such as Lopukhóf and his best friend and classmate Alexander Kirsanov.

The commune thrives, leading to the formation of a second. But in the meantime, Kirsanov has fallen in love with Viéra, and she has come to realize that she does not love Lopukhóf as much as she thought she did. Lopukhóf, whose ardour for his wife remains undimmed, recognises this too and tries to manipulate events in the background before eventually discussing the problem with a distraught Viéra.

In secret, Lopukhóf disappears and fakes his own suicide, as described in the preface. This leaves Kirsanov and Viéra free to marry one another. Eventually, the famed Rakhmetov character reveals Lopukhóf's faked suicide to Viéra. Though satisfied with her work with the seamstress commune, Viéra begins to study medicine to become a doctor and break the public prejudice against women joining such a profession.

The book's final section focuses on Kirsanov and the patient he is treating. This young woman is suffering partly because of a lack of freedom to marry as she pleases. Kirsanov not only solves this problem but helps her to realize that the man she wishes to marry is a licentious and lackluster partner. The woman eventually meets and falls in love with Charles Beaumont, a man who claims to have been an American industrialist partially raised in Russia. Charles steers the young woman towards Viéra's circle, which she quickly joins. Finally, Charles and the woman marry. Viéra meets Charles for the first time and realizes that Charles is Lopukhóf returned from the U.S. The Kirsanovs and "Beaumonts" eventually move in together in a ménage à quatre.

== Utopianism in the novel ==
The novel advocates the creation of small socialist cooperatives based on the Russian peasant commune, but ones that are oriented toward industrial production. The author promoted the idea that the intellectual's duty was to educate and lead the laboring masses in Russia along a path to socialism that is predicted to bypass capitalism. Despite his minor role, Rakhmetov, one of the characters in the novel, became an emblem of the philosophical materialism and nobility of Russian radicalism. Through one character's dream, the novel also expresses a society gaining "eternal joy" of an earthly kind.

The work itself can be analyzed as a work of literary utopia through its alternating narrative style, wherein Chernyshevsky makes use of metaliterary techniques that implicate the reader through the author's interruptions and direct addresses to the reader. The reader's complicity with the author, who is presumably the narrator, further implicates them in the political act of engaging with Chernyshevsky's ideology.

=== Viéra Pavlovna's dreams ===
Viéra Pavlovna has four dreams throughout the course of the novel. Viéra's dreams ultimately work to transform her own desires into action. Viéra Pavlovna's dreams follow in the Russian literary tradition of the prophetic dream, having a predictive relationship from sleep to waking life.

In her first dream, Viéra's "dream-guide" (a version of herself) introduces herself as "the bride of your [Viéra's] bridegroom," solidifying Viéra's intention to marry Lopukhóf and free herself from her cellar. In her dream, Viéra continues to free other young girls from their own cellars. Viéra does so in real life by forming her sewing co-operative and residential commune that affords both herself and other young girls the ability to become financially independent and self-sufficient.

Viéra Pavlovna witnesses a theoretical conversation between Lopukhóf and Kirsanov about the philosophical constituents of dirt in her second dream. While this dream does not appear to directly spur Viéra into revolutionary action, the conversation is an allegory for Chernyshevsky's belief that socioeconomic conditions shape individuals. Wagner says of this dream:

Chernyshevsky uses Liebig's theories regarding the fertility of different types of soil... to expound his own idea that socioeconomic conditions shape an individual's character, and that therefore the revolutionary transformation of these conditions will ensure social justice and prosperity by fostering appropriate personality traits.

Viéra Pavlovna's third dream exposes her doubts within her marriage to Lopukhóf, forming the foundation for Viéra's formation of a variety of relationships later in the novel that do not conform to the monogamous and heterosexual social norms.

Ultimately, Viéra's fourth dream constructs an agrarian utopia. Viéra's sees a crystal palace that is a technological and scientific marvel. The utopia in Viéra's dream is reminiscent of Charles Fourier's phalanstères. Viéra's dream-guide champions equal rights between all women and men as the foundation for this utopian society. It is here that Viéra recognizes herself as her dream-guide, thus positioning utopian potential in the everyday through such actions and ideologies as Viéra Pavlovna's.

== Influence ==
The novel is known for inspiring several generations of activists and revolutionaries, particularly in Russia including populists, nihilists, and Marxists. Likewise, Vladimir Lenin, Georgi Plekhanov, Peter Kropotkin, Alexandra Kollontai, Rosa Luxemburg, and Swedish writer August Strindberg were all highly impressed with the book. Emma Goldman, a Russian-born anarchist, describes her intent to found a sewing cooperative based on Viéra Pavlovna's model found in the novel.

The novel came to be officially regarded as a Russian classic in the Soviet period, as Chernyshevsky was celebrated as a forefather of the revolution. According to Joseph Frank, "Chernyshevsky's novel, far more than Marx's Capital, supplied the emotional dynamic that eventually went to make the Russian Revolution."

The novel was controversial upon its publishing and has provoked mixed responses. Fyodor Dostoevsky mocked the utilitarianism and utopianism of the novel in his 1864 novella Notes from Underground, as well as in his 1872 novel Demons, as did Vladimir Nabokov in his final novel in Russian, The Gift. Leo Tolstoy wrote his own What Is to Be Done?, published in 1886, based on his own ideas of moral responsibility. Vladimir Lenin named his 1902 pamphlet What Is to Be Done? due to the influence the novel had on him.

The novel's influence spread beyond the Russian radical tradition and Russian radical intellectuals. For example, it is referenced by Tony Kushner multiple times in his play Slavs!, by André Gide's Les caves du Vatican (Lafcadio's Adventures) and, some have argued, indirectly by Ayn Rand.

In 2024, General Secretary of the Chinese Communist Party Xi Jinping invoked the novel during the 16th BRICS summit.
