= Nikolay Chernyshevsky =

Russian writer and philosopher (1828–1889)

- Николай Чернышевский
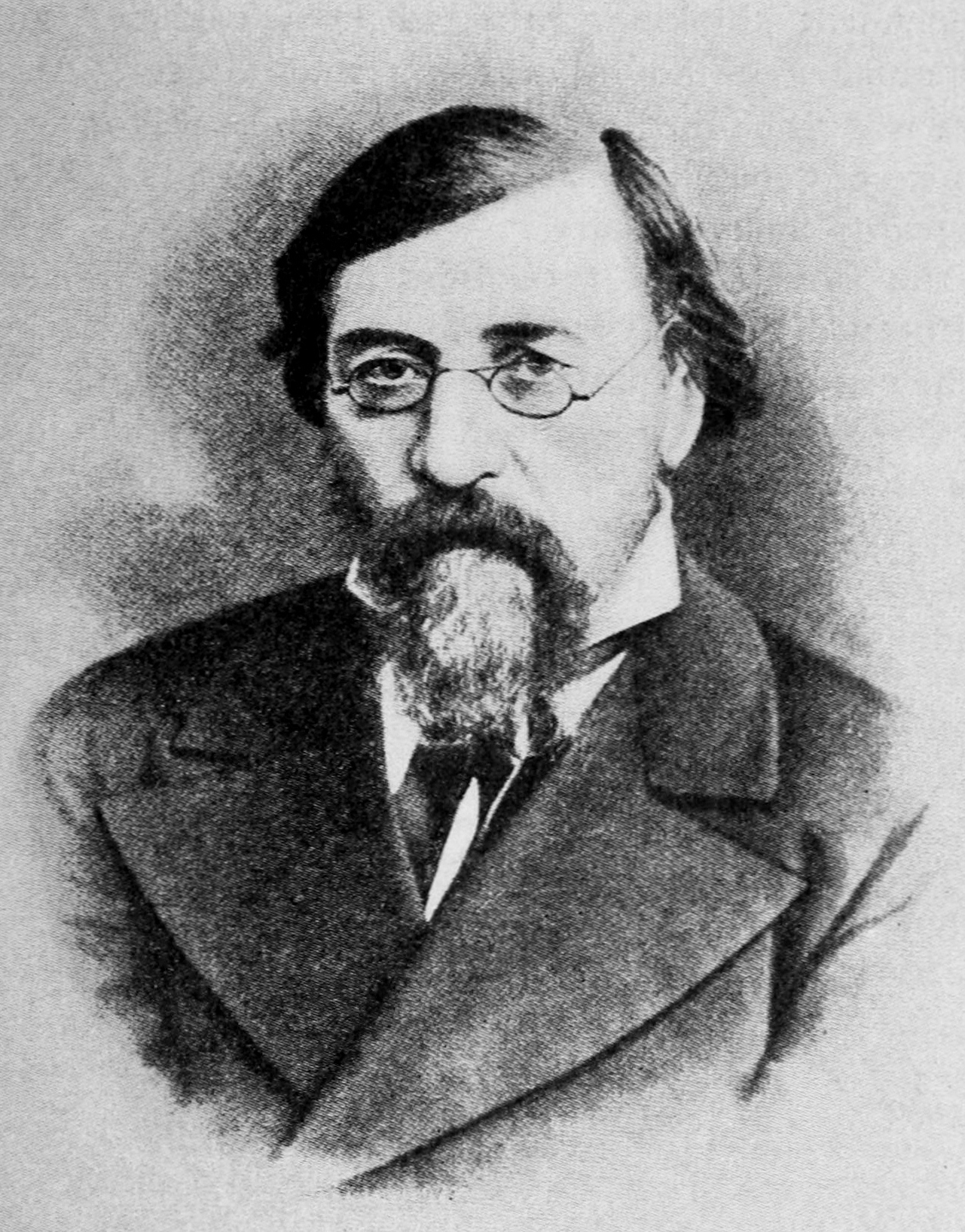
- Born: 24 July 1828; Saratov, Saratov Governorate, Russian Empire
- Died: 29 October 1889 (aged 61); Saratov, Russian Empire

Philosophical work
- Era: 19th-century philosophy
- Region: Russian philosophy
- School: Russian nihilism; Utopian socialism; Narodism
- Main interests: Russian literature; materialism; positivism; aesthetics
- Notable works: What Is to Be Done?
- Notable ideas: Rational egoism; Materialist conception of aesthetics

Nikolay Gavrilovich Chernyshevsky (Note: Russian: Николай Гаврилович Чернышевский, IPA: [nʲɪkɐˈlaj ɡɐˈvrʲiləvʲit͡ɕ t͡ɕɪrnɨˈʂɛfskʲɪj]) (24 July [O.S. 12 July] 1828 – 29 October [O.S. 17 October] 1889) was a Russian literary and social critic, journalist, novelist, democrat, and socialist philosopher, often identified as a utopian socialist and leading theoretician of Russian nihilism and the Narodniks. He was the dominant intellectual figure of the 1860s revolutionary democratic movement in Russia, despite spending much of his later life in exile to Siberia, and was later highly praised by Karl Marx, Georgi Plekhanov, and Vladimir Lenin.

== Biography ==
The son of a priest, Chernyshevsky was born in Saratov in 1828, and stayed there until 1846. He graduated at the local seminary where he learned English, French, German, Italian, Latin, Greek and Old Slavonic. It was there that he gained a love of literature, and also there that he became an atheist.

He was inspired by the works of Hegel, Ludwig Feuerbach and Charles Fourier and particularly the works of Vissarion Belinsky and Alexander Herzen. By the time he graduated from the Saint Petersburg University in 1850, Chernyshevsky developed revolutionary, democratic, and materialist views. From 1851 to 1853, he taught Russian language and literature at the Saratov Gymnasium. He openly expressed his beliefs to students, some of whom later became revolutionaries. From 1853 to 1862, he lived in Saint Petersburg, and became the chief editor of Sovremennik (“The Contemporary”), in which he published his main literary reviews and his essays on philosophy.

Chernyshevsky was sympathetic to the 1848 revolutions throughout Europe. He followed the events of the time and rejoiced in the gains of the democratic and revolutionary parties.

In 1855, Chernyshevsky defended his master's dissertation, "The Aesthetic Relation of Art to Reality", which contributed for the development of materialist aesthetics in Russia. Chernyshevsky believed that "What is of general interest in life -- that is the content of art" and that art should be a "textbook of life." He wrote, "Science is not ashamed to say that its aim is to understand and explain reality, and then to use its explanation for man's benefit. Let not art be ashamed to admit that its aim is ... to reproduce this precious reality and explain it for the good of mankind."

In 1862, he was arrested and confined in the Fortress of St. Peter and Paul, where he wrote his famous novel What Is to Be Done? The novel was an inspiration to many later Russian revolutionaries, who sought to emulate one of the novel's characters Rakhmetov, who was wholly dedicated to the revolution, ascetic in his habits and ruthlessly disciplined, to the point of sleeping on a bed of nails and eating only raw steak in order to build strength for the Revolution. Among those who have referenced the novel include Lenin, who wrote a political pamphlet of the same name.

In 1862, Chernyshevsky was sentenced to civil execution (mock execution), followed by penal servitude (1864–1872), and by exile to Vilyuisk, Siberia (1872–1883). He died at the age of 61.

== Ideas and influence ==
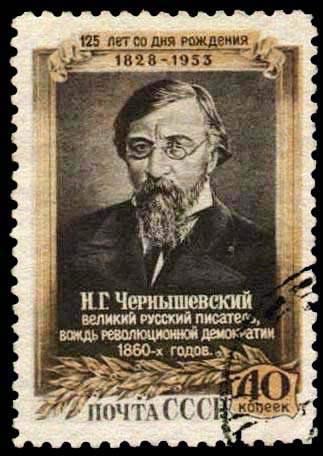
Chernyshevsky honoured on a 1953 stamp

Chernyshevsky was a founder of Narodism, Russian agrarian socialism, and agitated for the revolutionary overthrow of the autocracy and the creation of a socialist society based on the old peasant commune. He exercised the greatest influence upon populist youth of the 1860s and 1870s.

Chernyshevsky believed that American democracy was the best aspect of American life. He welcomed the election of Abraham Lincoln in 1860, which he believed marked a new period for "the great North American people" and that America would progress to heights "not attained since Jefferson's time." He praised these developments: "The good repute of the North American nation is important for all nations with the rapidly growing significance of the North American states in the life of all humanity."

Chernyshevsky's ideas were heavily influenced by Alexander Herzen, Vissarion Belinsky, and Ludwig Andreas Feuerbach. He saw class struggle as the means of society's forward movement and advocated for the interests of the working people. In his view, the masses were the chief maker of history. He is reputed to have used the phrase “the worse the better”, to indicate that the worse the social conditions became for the poor, the more inclined they would be to launch a revolution (though he did not originate the phrase, which predates his birth; for example, in an 1814 letter John Adams used it when discussing the lead-up to the American revolution).

Chernyshevsky read the works of Charles Darwin, including On the Origin of Species and The Descent of Man, and Selection in Relation to Sex, while in prison, and he was outspoken in his opposition to Darwinism. He argued that while Thomas Malthus had simply proposed the idea that excess reproduction causes poverty, Darwin according to his interpretation glorified poverty as a vehicle for natural selection to take place.

There are those arguing, in the words of Professor Joseph Frank, that “Chernyshevsky’s novel What Is to Be Done?, far more than Marx’s Das Kapital, supplied the emotional dynamic that eventually went to make the Russian Revolution”.

Fyodor Dostoyevsky was enraged by what he saw as the simplicity of the political and psychological ideas expressed in the book, and wrote Notes from Underground largely as a reaction against it.

Russian revolutionary and head of the Soviet government Vladimir Lenin praised Chernyshevsky: "...he approached all the political events of his times in a revolutionary spirit and was able to exercise a revolutionary influence by advocating, in spite of all the barriers and obstacles placed in his way by the censorship, the idea of a peasant revolution, the idea of the struggle of the masses for the overthrow of all the old authorities”.

Karl Marx and Friedrich Engels studied Chernyshevsky's works and called him a "great Russian scholar and critic".

A number of scholars have contended that Ayn Rand, who grew up in Russia when Chernyshevsky's novel was still influential and ubiquitous, was influenced by the book.

Chernyshevsky favored realist aesthetics over the idealist aesthetics which were prevalent in Russia during the nineteenth century. In the 1930s, he was viewed as a revolutionary-democrat writer, and described as a major figure whose works anticipated the development of socialist realism. His works contributed to the development of Chinese Communist cultural politics and theories, particularly The Aesthetic Relations of Art to Reality, which Zhou Yang translated into Chinese in 1942, shortly before the Yan'an Talks.

== Works ==
Novels

- What Is to Be Done? (1863)
- A Story Within A Story (1863) (unfinished)
- Prologue: A Novel for the Beginning of the 1860s (1870) (unfinished)

Philosophy

- Aesthetic Relations of Art to Reality (1855)
- The Nature of Human Knowledge (1855)
- Critique of Philosophical Prejudices Against Communal Ownership (1858)
- The Anthropological Principle in Philosophy (1860)

Literary criticism

- Essays on the Gogol Period in Russian Literature (1856)
