= What Is to Be Done? =

1902 pamphlet by Vladimir Lenin

What Is to Be Done? Burning Questions of Our Movement
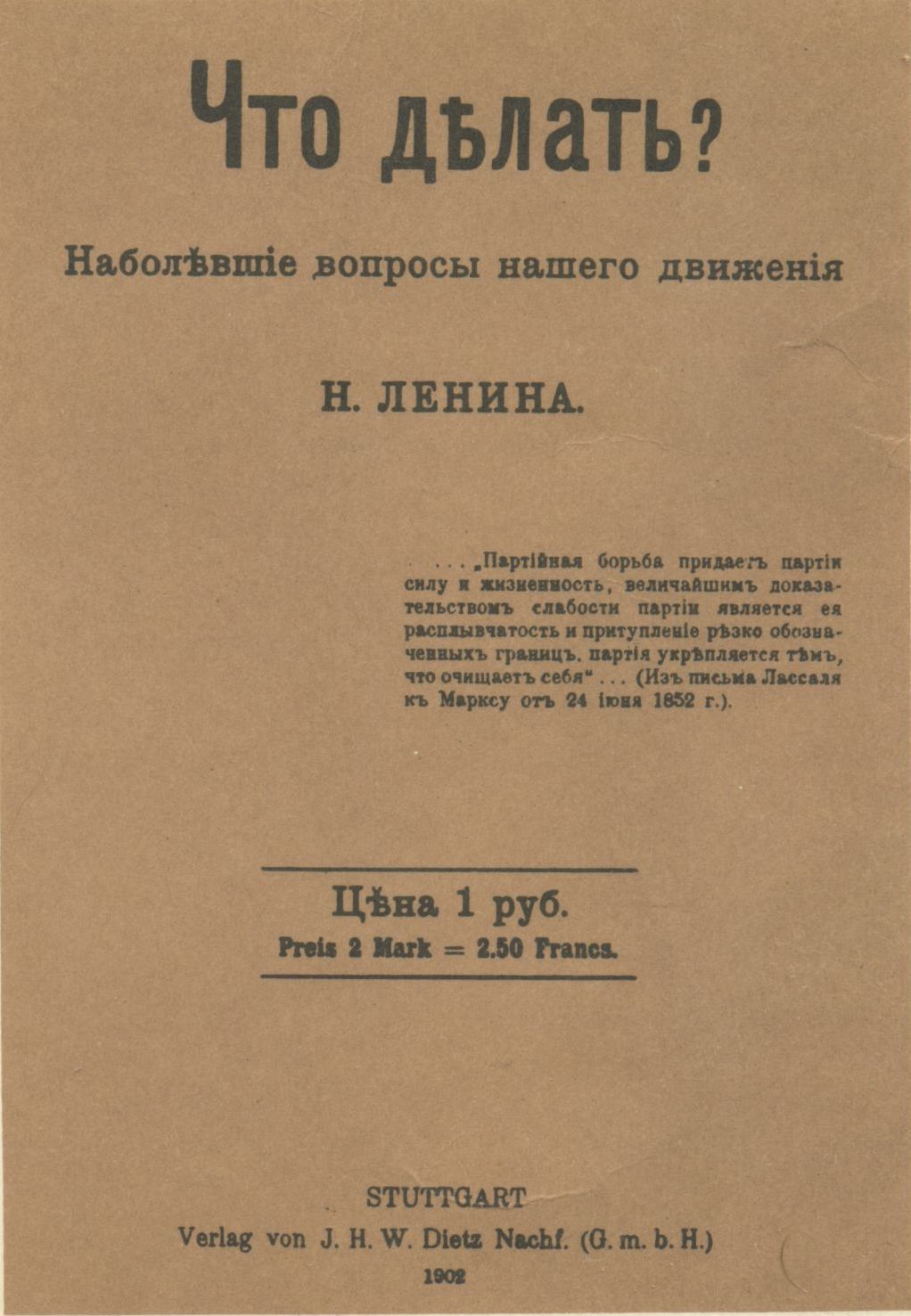
- Original cover
- Author: Vladimir Lenin (as N. Lenin)
- Original title: Что дѣлать? Наболѣвшіе вопросы нашего движенія
- Language: Russian
- Published: 1902

What Is to Be Done? Burning Questions of Our Movement (Note: Pre-reformed Russian: Что дѣлать? Наболѣвшіе вопросы нашего движенія; modern Russian spelling: Что делать? Наболевшие вопросы нашего движения, romanized: Chto delat? Nabolevshie voprosy nashego dvizheniya) is a political pamphlet written by Vladimir Lenin (credited as N. Lenin) in 1901 and published in March 1902. He previewed the work in a May 1901 Iskra article, "Where to Begin", which he called "a skeleton plan to be developed in greater detail in a pamphlet now in preparation for print". The title of What Is to Be Done? was taken from an 1863 novel of the same name by Russian revolutionary Nikolai Chernyshevsky.

The booklet's central focus is the ideological formation of the proletariat. Lenin argues that the working class will not become politically advanced simply by fighting economic battles against employers over wages, hours, and the like. To imbue the working class with Marxist principles, he recommends a cadre of dedicated revolutionaries form a vanguard political party that can teach Marxism to workers.

The legacy of What Is to Be Done? has been much debated. The ideas put forth in the pamphlet regarding the composition and organization of a successful revolutionary party were said to have precipitated the 1903 split of the Russian Social Democratic Labor Party (RSDLP) into the Bolshevik ("majority") faction and Menshevik ("minority") faction. Some, including Lenin, claimed that readers of What Is to Be Done? misrepresented its contents to further their own agendas.

== Main points ==
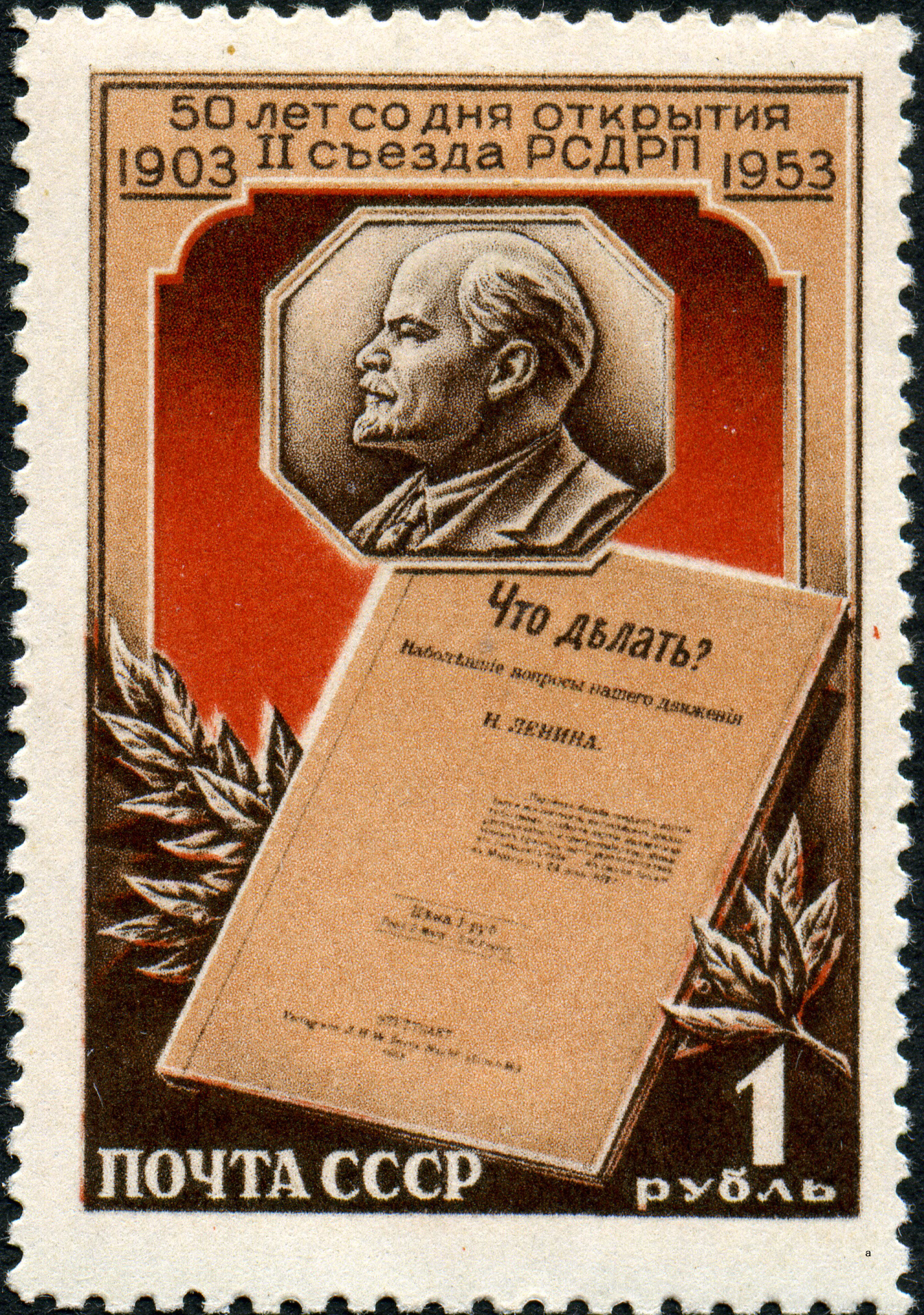
1953 stamp

Lenin first confronts the so-called economist trend in Russian social democracy that followed the line of the German Marxist Eduard Bernstein. Lenin labels Bernstein's position opportunistic, a point proven (in Lenin's estimation) when French socialist Alexandre Millerand accepted a cabinet post in his country's bourgeois government. In response to the economists' demand for freedom of criticism, Lenin asserts that orthodox Marxists must have the same right to criticize. He emphasizes that in fighting the bourgeoisie, Russian revolutionaries should pay particular attention to theoretical questions, recalling Friedrich Engels' statement that in the struggle for social democracy, the theoretical form of struggle was as important as the political and economic.

Lenin explains that workers will not automatically develop class consciousness as a result of economic conflicts with their employers or through actions like spontaneous strikes and demonstrations. Instead, professional revolutionaries need to form a political party to advocate Marxist ideas and persuade workers to join the movement for change. He writes that political understanding requires understanding the entirety of society, not just what happens in the workplace:

Class political consciousness can be brought to the workers only from without; that is, only from outside the economic struggle, from outside the sphere of relations between workers and employers. The sphere from which alone it is possible to obtain this knowledge is the sphere of relationships (of all classes and strata) to the state and the government, the sphere of the interrelations between all classes.

Reflecting on the wave of strikes in late 19th century Russia, Lenin observes that "the history of all countries shows that the working class, exclusively by its own efforts, is able to develop only trade union consciousness"; that is, the conviction that it must combine into unions, petition the government for pro-labor legislation, etc. However, socialist theory in Russia, and elsewhere in Europe, was the product of the "educated representatives of the propertied classes", the intellectuals or "revolutionary socialist intelligentsia". Lenin states that Marx and Engels themselves, the founders of modern scientific socialism, belonged to this bourgeois intelligentsia.

== Legacy ==
The ideas expressed in What Is to Be Done?, especially regarding the "Concept of The Party" and the need for a core of professional revolutionaries, stirred controversy and contributed to the Bolshevik-Menshevik split in 1903 at the Second Congress of the RSDLP. In a preface to his collection Twelve Years, published in 1907, Lenin said his arguments in What Is to Be Done? were exaggerated and distorted by the Mensheviks; that the pamphlet was "a summary of Iskra tactics and Iskra organisational policy in 1901 and 1902. Precisely a 'summary', no more and no less"; and that it was part of the struggle against "the then dominant trend of Economism".

Hal Draper wrote in 1990 that "Leninologists" in the Kremlin later treated What Is to Be Done? like it was Lenin's last word on revolutionary organizing, when it was merely an early formulation by him on how a small group of Russian social democrats could begin to build an effective movement, and how vital it was to not focus solely on the economic dimensions of the working-class struggle. Draper also noted that people misread Lenin's views in WITBD on spontaneity vs. conscious organization:

No one in the movement, certainly not Lenin, had any doubts about the important and positive role played by "spontaneity" – spontaneous revolts, struggles, etc.... What Lenin argued against in WITBD and elsewhere was the glorification of spontaneity for its own sake; for what this glorification meant in actuality was a decrying of conscious organizational activity or party work or leadership.... The claim that Lenin was hostile to "spontaneous" struggles verges on nonsense. Whenever a Leninologist purports to quote Lenin on this subject, what he really quotes are Lenin's arguments against relying only on spontaneity to usher in socialism by some millennial date.
