= Marie Goldsmith =

Russian-French biologist and anarchist (1871–1933)

- Мария Гольдсмит
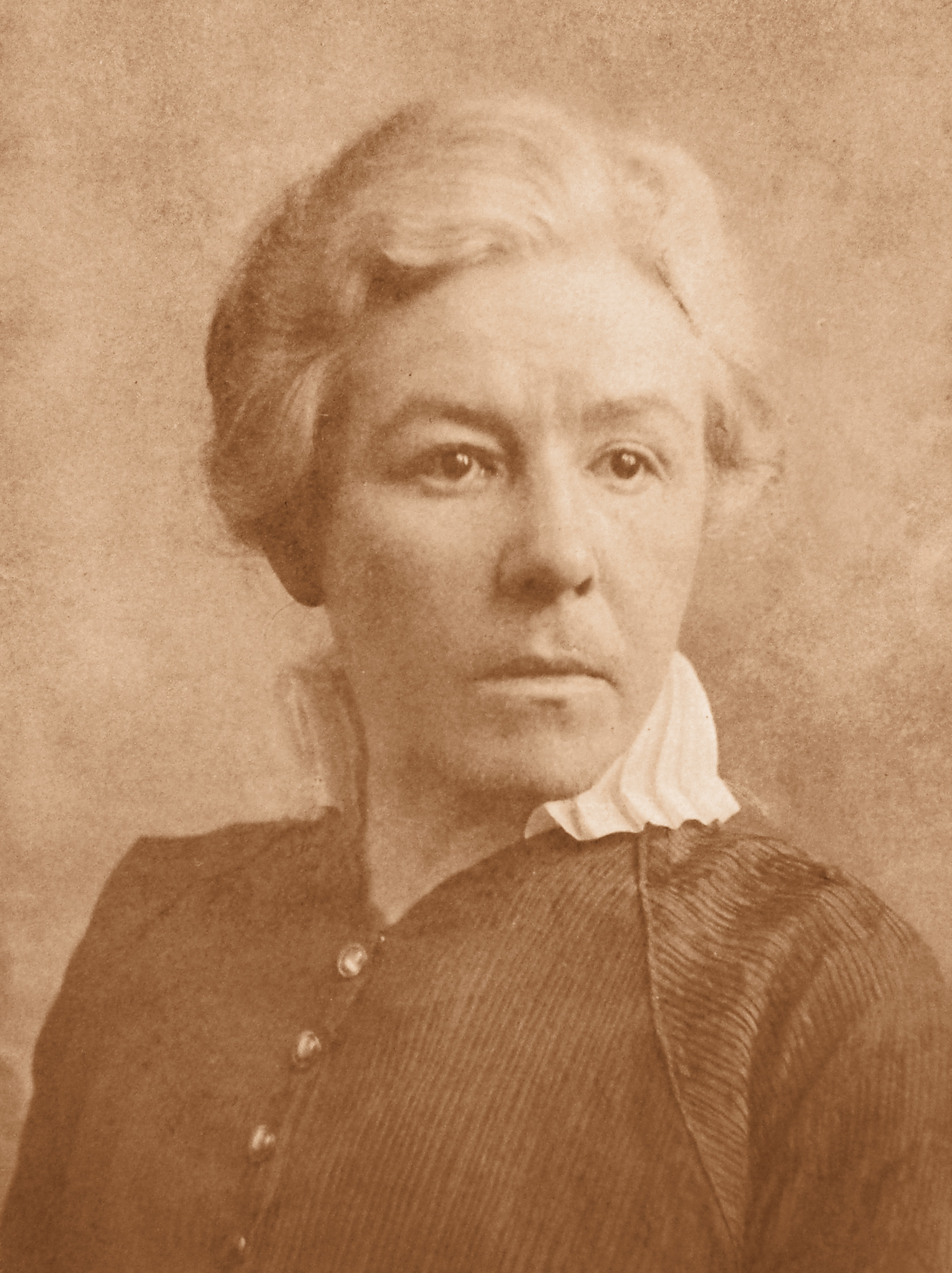
- Goldsmith, 1916
- Born: Maria Isidorovna Goldsmit; 19 July 1871; Saint Petersburg, Russian Empire
- Died: 11 January 1933 (aged 61); Paris, France
- Resting place: Thiais Cemetery
- Other names: Maria Korn; Maria Isidine
- Citizenship: French (from 1924)
- Education: University of Paris
- Parents: Isidor Goldsmith (father); Sofia Goldsmith (mother)
- Scientific career
- Fields: Evolutionary biology, ichthyology
- Thesis: Réactions physiologiques et psychique des poissons (1915)
- Doctoral advisor: Yves Delage

Maria Isidorovna Goldsmith (Russian: Мария Исидоровна Гольдсмит; (Note: French: Marie Goldsmith; Yiddish: מאַריא ַ סידעראַוונא גאָלדשמיד, romanized: Maria Siderovna Goldshmid. Also known by her pen names Maria Korn and Maria Isidine.) 19 July [O.S. 7 July] 1871 – 11 January 1933) was a Russian-French biologist and anarchist political theorist.

Born in the Russian Empire, she was forced into exile at an early age due to her parents' radical politics. In Paris, her mother influenced her interest in the natural sciences and the political philosophy of anarchism. In the 1890s, she enrolled to study biology at the University of Paris and joined the exiled Russian and diasporic Jewish anarchist movements. While studying for her PhD, she came under the tutelage of the evolutionary theorists Yves Delage and Peter Kropotkin, who influenced her understanding of Darwinian evolution, Lamarckian inheritance and mutual aid. At the outbreak of the Russian Revolution of 1905, she and Georgy Gogelia established the Bread and Freedom group, within which they became two of the first Russian proponents of anarcho-syndicalism.

During the 1910s, Goldsmith published a series of books on evolutionary biology, co-authored with Delage. Together they explored the various different theories of evolution and made a case for cooperation as a more influential factor than competition, in opposition to social Darwinism and the theory of "survival of the fittest". They also defended the theory of symbiogenesis and investigated several cases of symbiosis in nature. By 1915, Goldsmith had completed her PhD and branched out into researching parthenogenesis, tropism, comparative psychology and evolutionary psychology. Her focus was largely on marine biology and the behaviour of fish. After the outbreak of World War I, she took the side of the Manifesto of the Sixteen in the internationalist–defencist schism, and she expressed support for the Russian Revolution of 1917 until the suppression of the Kronstadt Rebellion.

Following the death of Delage and Kropotkin in the early 1920s, Goldsmith became isolated from the scientific community and struggled to find stable employment. Her difficulties were exacerbated by her status as an immigrant, a woman and a prominent radical activist. During the late 1920s, she became involved in the anarchist movement's debates surrounding the Platform, which she criticised for authoritarian tendencies. After her mother's death in January 1933, she committed suicide. Her work remained influential within her scientific field, as well as the anarchist movement, into the 21st century.

== Early life and activism ==
Maria Isidorovna Goldsmith was born on 19 July [O.S. 7 July] 1871, in the Russian capital of Saint Petersburg. (Note: Sources differ on the date and place of her birth. Dates on official documents, including her own degrees and immigration documents, indicate she was born on 19 July [O.S. 7 July] 1871. Some sources have given her year of birth as 1873. According to Max Nettlau, she was born in a katorga in Pinega, while her parents were internally exiled, but this is contradicted by her father's correspondence.) Her father was Isidor Albertovich, a lawyer and publisher of a positivist journal; he came from a family of Jewish converts to Lutheranism. Her mother was Sofia Ivanovna, a physician and botanist; she came from a Russian noble family. Goldsmith's parents saw that she received an education from an early age.

Both of Goldsmith's parents were involved in radical politics, as followers of the socialist Pyotr Lavrov and friends of the Bakunin family. They were forced into internal exile in the Russian North for their political activism, and had to flee the Russian Empire entirely in June 1884. Still a child, Goldsmith's parents took her into exile in France and settled in Paris. There, Isidor was arrested, imprisoned and soon died from a chronic illness. As her mother was also chronically ill, Goldsmith was forced to enter the workforce at a young age in order to support herself and her mother. She would continue living with and caring for her mother, even into adulthood. Through her mother's influence, Goldsmith became interested in the natural sciences and radical politics.

Her experiences had made her distrustful of the state, and during the 1890s, she gravitated towards anarchism after attending lectures by Saul Yanovsky and Peter Kropotkin. She turned her home on Rue Marie-Rose into a meeting place for exiled Russian anarchists, ensuring a strong anarchist presence within the Russian emigré movement in Paris. Goldsmith also began a life-long correspondence with the anarchist activist Emma Goldman. She also made contact with anarchist members of the Jewish diaspora in Paris; although she was not herself a follower of Judaism and had not ever studied Yiddish, she still identified with her father's Jewish roots. She rarely missed the Jewish anarchist movement's events, and it was within this milieu that she began her career of anarchist activism and developed her own anarchist political theory.

== Career ==
=== Education and early scientific career ===
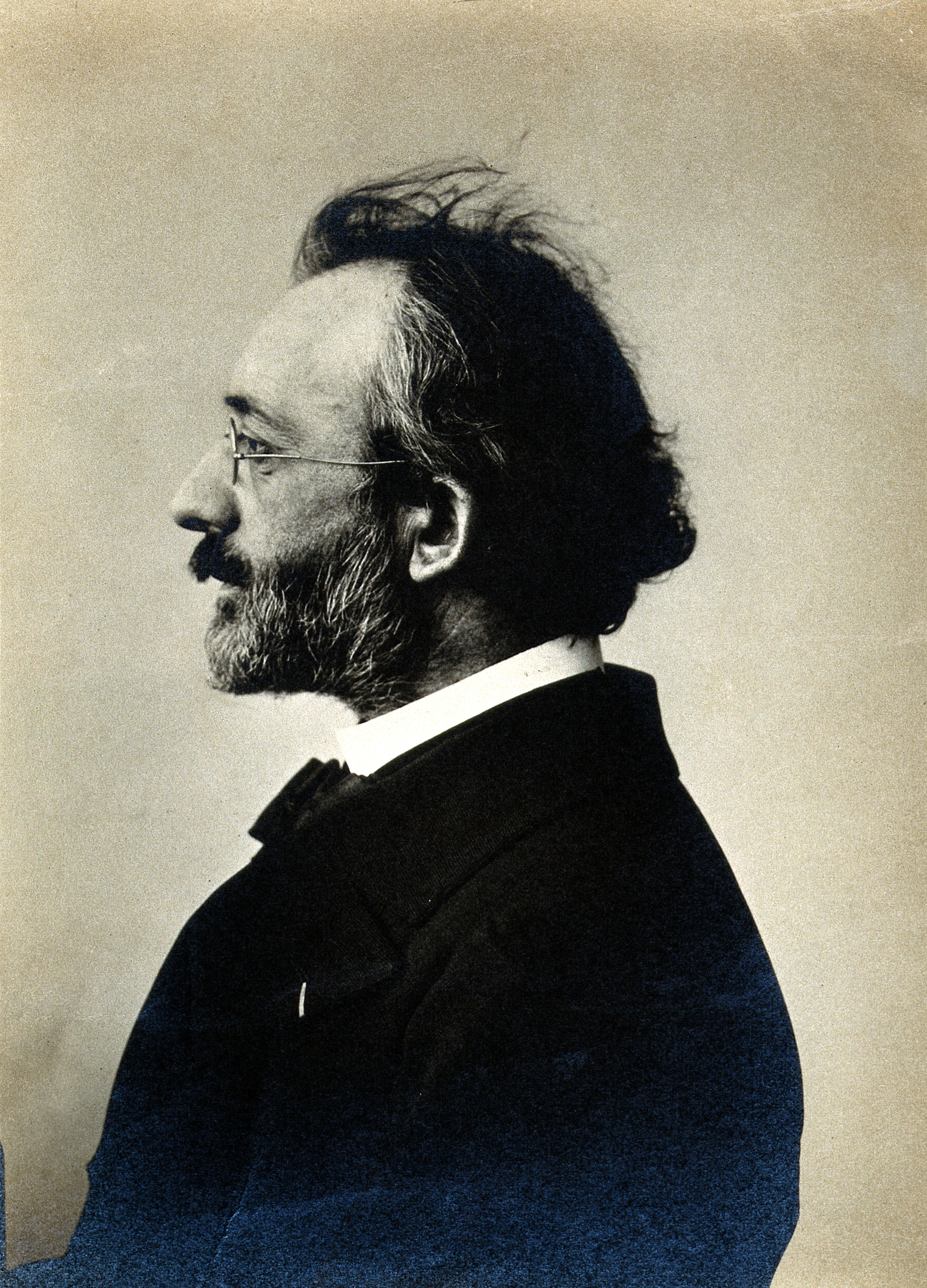
Yves Delage, Goldsmith's tutor and scientific collaborator

After coming of age, Goldsmith enrolled in the University of Paris to study biology. In 1892, she joined the Internationalist Revolutionary Socialist Students (ESRI), within which she authored pamphlets on anarchist feminism and anti-Zionism. She also joined a Bourse du Travail in Issy-les-Moulineaux, which she represented at the International Socialist Workers and Trade Union Congress in London; there she was part of the anti-parliamentary faction. After graduating with her Licentiate in 1894, she began working as a member of staff at the University's physiology laboratory, while studying for a PhD under the evolutionary biologist Yves Delage. Goldsmith and Delage became close collaborators and research partners. Delage appointed Goldsmith as general secretary of the scientific journal L'année biologique, which she ran from 1902 to 1924.

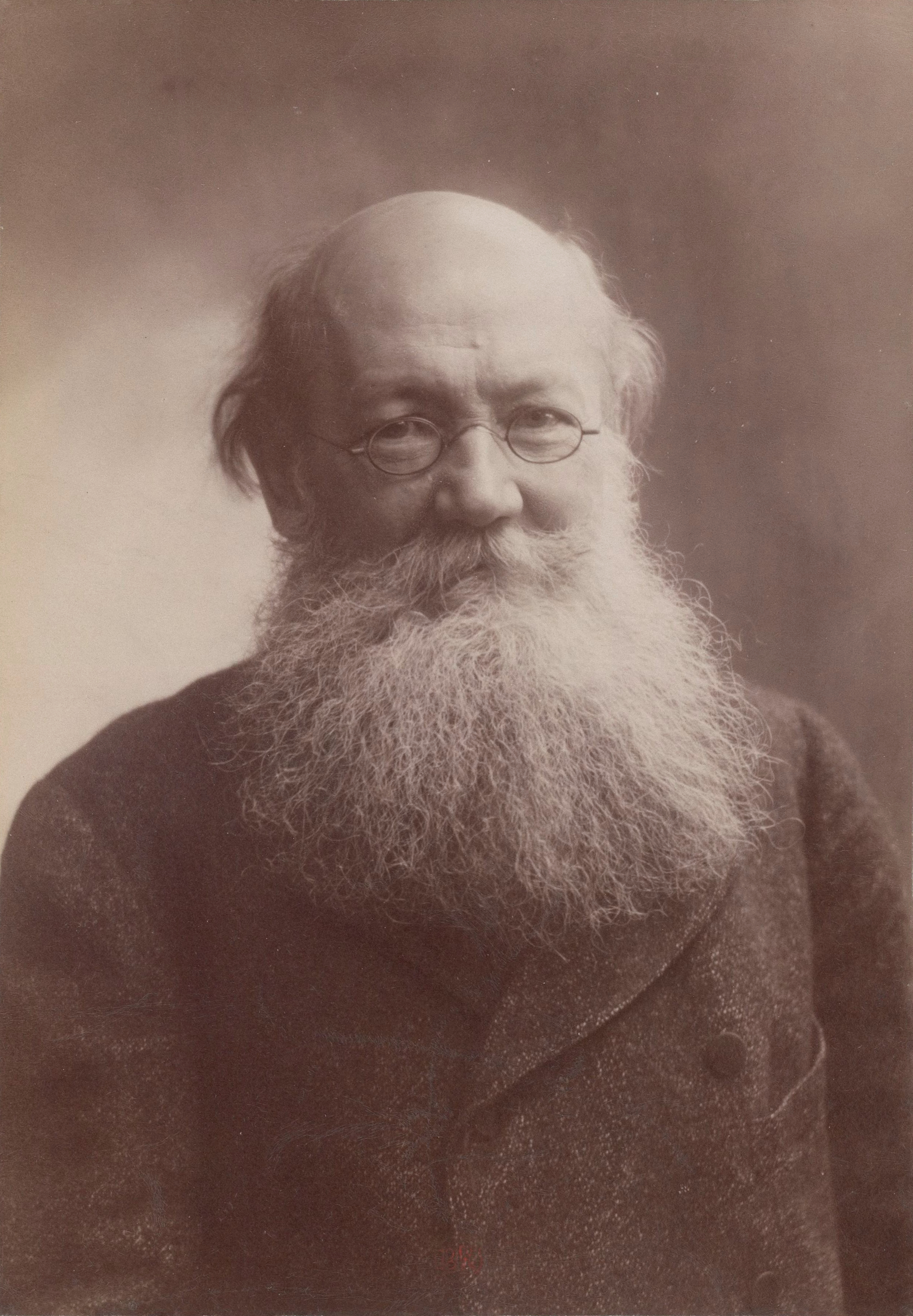
Peter Kropotkin, Goldsmith's mentor and collaborator in both scientific and political matters

Goldsmith also became a close friend of the biologist Peter Kropotkin, constantly corresponding with him on scientific and political matters from 1897 to 1917. As Kropotkin was prohibited from entering France, they were unable to meet face-to-face. Like Delage and Kropotkin, Goldsmith became a staunch proponent of the Darwinian theory on evolution and the Lamarckian theory on heredity. Kropotkin entrusted Goldsmith with the completion and translation of his book Mutual Aid: A Factor of Evolution, in the event that he died, as he believed Goldsmith was the only person who shared both his scientific knowledge and worldview.

=== 1905 Revolution ===
By 1903, revolutionary sentiments were rising in Russia and among the Russian emigré community; Goldsmith predicted that a revolution in Russia was imminent. Together with the Georgian anarchist Georgy Gogelia, Goldsmith established the anarchist-communist Bread and Freedom group, which published a monthly journal from Geneva and smuggled it into Russia. Goldsmith wrote for the journal under the pen name "Maria Korn". Through the journal, Goldsmith and Gogelia became two of the first proponents of syndicalism in the Russian anarchist movement. They extolled sabotage and the general strike as powerful tools by which the working-class could assert itself, at a time when such terms were still foreign to the Russian language.

Goldsmith herself upheld the example of the French General Confederation of Labour (CGT) as a model for Russian anarchists to follow. Goldsmith advocated for anarcho-syndicalism, arguing that revolutionary syndicalist practices were only compatible with the ethics and philosophy of anarchism. The theory quickly spread, with a general strike breaking out in Baku as early as July 1903. The following year, Ukrainian factory workers in Chernigov began looking to establish a revolutionary workers' organisation, along the same lines as what Goldsmith and Gogelia had proposed. After the outbreak of the Russian Revolution of 1905, a general strike spread throughout the country in late October. The events prompted many of the journal's contributors to return to Russia, and it ceased publication in November 1905. According to Goldsmith, the journal was never able to achieve a wide circulation within Russia due to technical and organisational limitations.

Goldsmith and Gogelia were more optimistic about syndicalism than their mentor Kropotkin, who maintained only a qualified support for trade unions. Kropotkin was sceptical about the vanguardist tendencies of syndicalism and warned against Marxist influence within trade unions. Goldsmith recalled that Kropotkin was rather rigid on issues of tactics, and expressed hostility to the idea that "the end justifies the means". As expropriations increasingly led to political repression, she noted that most of its advocates aligned with Kropotkin's opposition to it. Goldsmith was also critical of Marxist and Sorelian forms of syndicalism, which was largely advocated by intellectuals unaffiliated with the labour movement; she believed that syndicalism was an inherently anarchist tradition.

After the suppression of the 1905 Revolution, Goldsmith and her group immediately began preparing themselves for the next one. She established the Paris Group of Russian Anarchist-Communists, which grew to 50 members and met in her home. In 1906, the group began publishing the journal Burevestnik, which Goldsmith wrote for. They organised regular rallies to commemorate the anniversaries of the Paris Commune and the Haymarket affair, as well as on the birth day of Mikhail Bakunin, where Goldsmith and Gogelia both gave speeches. The two also wrote for the Russian-American syndicalist newspaper Golos truda. Goldsmith and Kropotkin also discussed the creation of a new anarchist newspaper, specifically designed to appeal to the Russian peasantry. After a short-lived attempt to revive the Bread and Freedom group, Kropotkin began writing for the Russian anarchist-communist newspaper Rabochi Mir, although according to Goldsmith, he did not take any greater role in it as he distrusted large organisations. In 1906, she attended a conference of Russian anarchist exiles in London, where she authored reports on anarchist economics, organisation and tactics. In one of the reports, she advocated for communist anarchism and workers' control of the means of production, stating her belief that justice and solidarity in their "fullest form" was necessary for the ethical development of all humans and the creation of a free society.

=== Scientific publishing ===
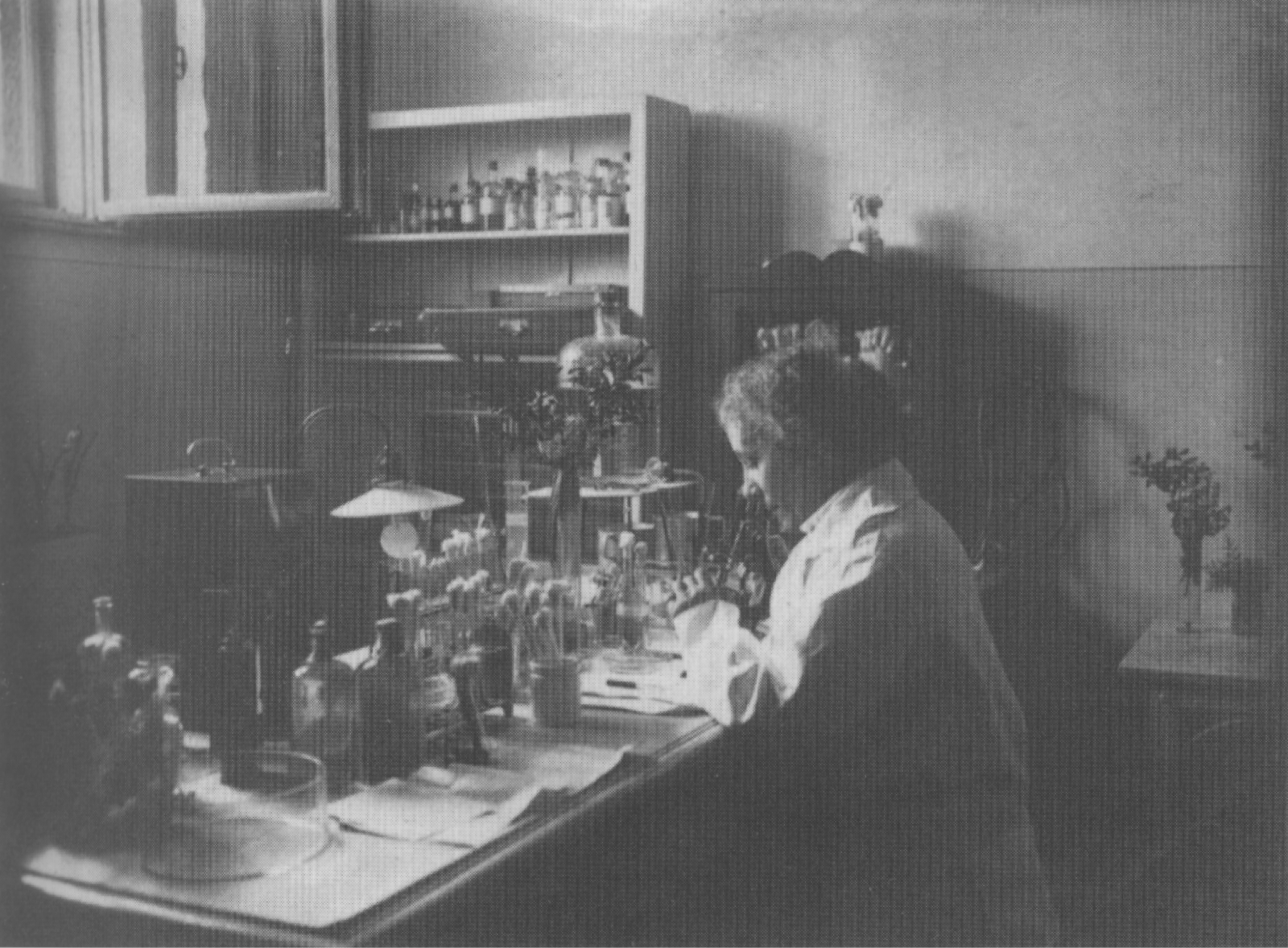
Goldsmith in her laboratory (c. 1910)

From 1909 to 1917, Goldsmith and Delage co-authored a number of books on evolutionary biology. Their first book, The Theories of Evolution, began with an anti-religious rebuttal of creationism and followed with a lengthy discussion of various evolutionary theories. In the book, Goldsmith and Delage defined Darwinism as a theory that emphasises random genetic variation, the struggle for existence and natural selection as the principle factors of evolution. They then broadly defined Lamarckism as a theory that emphasises individual adaptation to ones' own environment, rather than predetermination, as the precedent for evolution. They contrasted the narrow perspective of Lamarckism with the more systematic focus of Neo-Darwinism, as expressed by August Weismann. According to their view of Lamarckism, inheritance occurs when an adaptation to a certain environmental stimulus becomes independent of it in subsequent generations; they interpreted Lamarckian inheritance in solely descriptive terms, without making assumptions about the mechanisms for the transition between "stimulus-dependent" and "stimulus-independent" adaptations. In a chapter on the origin of species, they discussed the potential role of allopatric speciation and reproductive isolation, although they stressed that they lacked a unified theory that could synthesise adaptation and speciation into a single framework; this proposed theory would emerge decades later, with the development of population genetics. The book then concluded with a summary of Kropotkin's theory of mutual aid as a factor of evolution. Due to the book's overtly anti-religious content, its introduction was reprinted in Jean Grave's anarchist newspaper Les Temps nouveaux. The book was well-received by the international press, with The New York Times describing it as a comprehensive account of the contemporary debates on evolutionary biology. Its English translation was handled by the revolutionary socialist André Tridon.

In a 1911 article published in the Portuguese anarchist periodical A Sementeira, Goldsmith and Delage drew from Charles Darwin's book The Descent of Man to emphasise the role of cooperation and solidarity in evolution. They also rebutted Herbert Spencer's theory of "survival of the fittest" and T.H. Huxley's "struggle for existence", depicting them as corruptions of Darwinism to support existing social hierarchy and unrestrained competition at the expense of solidarity and cooperation. They accused Huxley of oversimplifying Darwin's concept of the struggle for existence by reducing it to a "fight to the death", where they defined it as a struggle by living things against their environmental conditions. Drawing from Kropotkin, Goldsmith and Delage sought to de-emphasise competition and to instead emphasise the importance of cooperation. In a direct challenge to the "survival of the fittest", they proposed that unfavourable conditions such as famine and drought actually weakened the strongest genetic variations, while favourable conditions allowed for new variations to prosper. They claimed that, in extreme conditions, cooperation and mutual aid, as opposed to competition, were essential to survival.

In 1913, they published their second book, which focused on parthenogenesis. In 1915, Goldsmith completed her PhD studies, defending a dissertation on the comparative physiology and psychology of fish. She then began writing for the Comptes rendus of the French Academy of Sciences; she published a number of articles on a variety of topics, including tropism, evolutionary psychology, parthenogenesis and Mendelism. In a review of Paul Portier's 1918 book on symbiogenesis, Goldsmith declared that he had convinced her of the possibility of asepsis, the similarity between bacteria and mitochondria, and symbiotes' relationship to vitamins. She and Delage also investigated symbiosis between legumes and bacteria, trees and fungi, and algae and microfauna. As Goldsmith published her research, she quickly gained a reputation within the scientific community, receiving numerous invitations to lecture in various different countries. She was in contact with many established scientists, including the French physiologist Charles Richet, Russian evolutionary psychologists Nadezhda Kohts and Vladimir Wagner, and Swiss naturalist Arnold Lang. She was also the scientific advisor to Georges Clemenceau, the prime minister of France, who held her in great esteem for her knowledge of biology. In 1919, she took a job as a researcher at the University of Paris Faculty of Science.

== Anarchist writings ==
By the turn of the 1920s, Goldsmith had become a prolific anarchist writer, penning articles on anarchist theory and the labour movement for a variety of publications in several different languages, including the French Les Temps Nouveaux and the Russian Delo truda. She also contributed to the Yiddish newspaper Fraye Arbeter Shtime, as well as other Jewish anarchist papers, with both difficulty and determination, as she struggled to understand Yiddish without assistance. She wrote for the anarchist press under pseudonyms, attempting to keep her scientific career separate from her anarchist activism. In her writings during this period, she focused largely on economic and organisational issues, moving away from her earlier focus on social issues.

=== World War I ===
Following the outbreak of World War I, Goldsmith expressed support for Kropotkin's Manifesto of the Sixteen, which took a defencist position and aligned his section of the anarchist movement with the Entente. She quoted from the manifesto at length in her article about it for Fraye Arbeter Shtime, although she refused to sign the manifesto herself, as she disagreed with its wording. She was sharply criticised for her position by the Russian internationalist Aleksandr Ge, who accused her of confusing liberal ideas such as equality before the law with anarchism and mockingly labelled her the "Joan of Arc of the Third Republic". She continued to defend her position on the war, even in the years after it had ended. In an article for Plus Loin, she held that, although participating in the war contradicted anti-militarist principles, the anarchist principle of resisting oppression and imperial invasion was more important and justified them joining the fight against the Central Powers.

=== 1917 Revolution ===
Following the outbreak of the 1917 Russian Revolution, many of Goldsmith's anarchist comrades, including Peter Kropotkin, decided to return to the country. Goldsmith herself stayed behind in Paris to care for her mother. As the Russian state's previous restrictions on freedom of the press were lifted, Goldsmith helped Kropotkin proofread his books and prepare them for their first legal publication in Russia. After Kropotkin died, Goldsmith completed and translated his final work Ethics: Origin and Development. From Paris, Goldsmith published a series of articles in Les Temps Nouveaux, in which she optimistically presented the ongoing revolution as the beginning of the end of capitalism. She argued that the revolution had not only made economic and political advancements, but also intellectual and moral advancements to Russian society. Recognising that the revolution was heading towards state socialism, she called for the establishment of workers' control of the economy and decentralisation. Goldsmith believed that the Bolsheviks' nationalist and statist tendencies, which had focused on a programme of nationalisation, ran counter to the abolition of private property advocated by communist economics and represented an obstacle to the revolution.

After the suppression of the Kronstadt Rebellion, Goldsmith's opinion of the revolution became more negative. She condemned the Red Army as counterrevolutionary and denied the Bolshevik narrative that the Kronstadt mutineers had been reactionaries. She characterised the Kronstadt rebellion as the truly revolutionary force, which had risen up against a dictatorship with the aim of achieving social equality and self-governance. In a 1925 article for Delo truda, she blamed the Marxist theory of the "dictatorship of the proletariat" for the Red Terror, depicting it as having justified a purge of all other left-wing tendencies and political factions in the name of creating a stateless society. Goldsmith emphasised her belief that revolutionary aims and revolutionary practice had to be consistent with each other, believing that no dictatorship could bring about freedom and that political repression inevitably compromised revolutionary enthusiasm. She concluded that the Soviet dictatorship represented a step backward from a stateless society, rather than a transition towards one.

=== Debates on the Platform ===
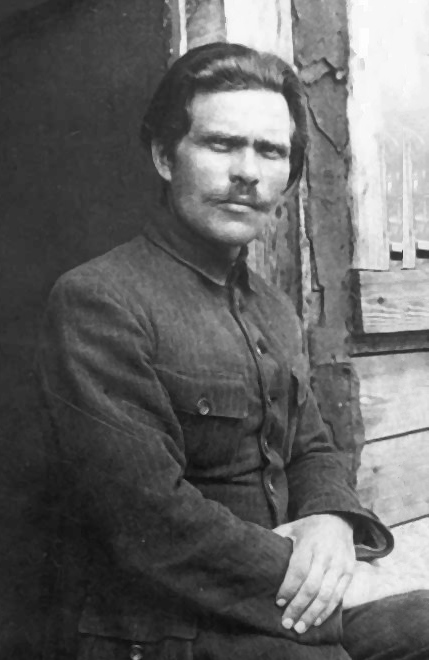
Nestor Makhno, one of the authors of the Platform

After the founding of the Revolutionary Syndicalist General Confederation of Labour (CGT-SR), she began contributing to its bulletin La Voix du Travail. She also joined the editorial board of Delo truda, alongside the anarchist revolutionaries Peter Arshinov and Nestor Makhno. She worked as the latter's secretary, editing and translating his memoirs. Goldsmith called for a revisiting of anarchist principles in the wake of the Russian Revolution, arguing that the events had affirmed the importance of anti-statism and anti-authoritarianism. She argued that, to anarchists, any revolution that does not establish a classless society "has not yet achieved its goal". She believed it unlikely that a revolution could instantaneously establish a stateless communist society, and argued that a transition towards one would be necessary. She therefore called for a permanent revolution, which would continuously move towards a stateless and classless society.

In 1926, Peter Arshinov and Nestor Makhno announced their development of The Platform, which had resulted from discussions about the collapse of the Ukrainian revolution and called for ideological and tactical unity. Goldsmith initially welcomed the Platform and wished it success, but soon became one of the first prominent anarchists to express reservations with the proposal. She was skeptical of the role of majorities and minorities in the anarchist movement, decrying what she worried could become a "tyranny of the majority". She also questioned how their proposed regime of free soviets would be structured, how they would supervise the masses and defend their revolution, whether they would preserve freedom of the press and freedom of speech, and whether they would distribute resources based on individual needs.

Goldsmith ultimately rejected the proposal that anarchist organisations should have a common policy and strategy, a rigid organisational structure, binding decisions or a party line. She also questioned its conception of collective responsibility, instead taking the normative individualist position that the anarchist movement should instead uphold a moral responsibility for its members' actions. She believed that every individual and local group within an organisation should have freedom of action, which she considered both more efficient and a way to preserve the rights of minorities. She worried that the Platform constituted a proposal for a centralised political party, along the lines of Bolshevism. This unleashed a heated debate over the Platform, which culminated with Arshinov leaving the anarchist movement in 1931; he specifically named Goldsmith as one of the anarchists who had alienated him with their "democratic-decadent" criticisms. In contrast, she remained on good terms with Makhno, keeping him entertained and checking on his health during the last years of his life.

== Later life, death and legacy ==
When Delage died in 1920, Goldsmith found it increasingly difficult to secure a stable job. She became isolated within her faculty, as some of her colleagues began attacking her status as an immigrant; she only became a naturalised French citizen in 1924. She was also unable to take positions offered by the US-based Carnegie Institution for Science and the Rockefeller Institute for Medical Research, as she had to keep caring for her mother. The furthest she went from Paris was the Station biologique de Roscoff in Brittany, where she continued her research of fish. In 1927, she took a job as a laboratory assistant for the École pratique des hautes études; and from 1930, she also led seminars at the University of Paris Faculty of Medicine. In 1929, she briefly returned to Russia to visit the State Darwin Museum in Moscow, where she observed Nadezhda Kohts' research on apes.

Goldsmith's mother died from her illness on 9 January 1933. Despondent, Goldsmith decided to commit suicide by poison. She died on 11 January, at the Hôpital Cochin, at the age of 61. In her suicide note, she handed over her belongings, including her collected correspondence with Kropotkin and her pet birds, to Sascha Schapiro and Ekaterina Bakunina. Although she also requested that her and her mother's bodies be buried alongside that of her father at the Ivry Cemetery, they were ultimately buried in the Thiais Cemetery.

Goldsmith received a series of obituaries and tributes in both the scientific and anarchist press. The Jewish anarchist poet Sholem Schwarzbard wrote a religiously-inspired obituary for her in Fraye Arbeter Shtime, while Nestor Makhno placed her alongside Kropotkin as one of the "titans of anarchism". Emma Goldman, Mollie Steimer and Alexander Berkman privately mourned her in their correspondence. In a letter to Pierre Ramus, Berkman remarked of Goldsmith's death that his generation of Russian anarchists was dying off. Alexander Berkman and Grigorii Maksimov attempted to raise money to publish Goldsmith's collected works, but they were ultimately unsuccessful. Berkman himself committed suicide in 1936. Their efforts were taken up 90 years later by the Black Flag Anarchist Review, which published a selection of nine of Goldsmith's articles in 2023.

During the Great Purge in the Soviet Union, the NKVD directed the burning of books that included Goldsmith's pamphlet Revolutionary Syndicalism and Anarchism, alongside Kropotkin's Mutual Aid and Bakunin's The State and Anarchism. Her extensive correspondence with Kropotkin, amounting to 400 letters, was preserved in the National Library of France. Typed copies of the letters have also been made by the Nicolaevsky Collection. In 1995, their correspondence was edited together and published by historian Michael Confino. The collected correspondence will always remain incomplete, as Kropotkin destroyed most of Goldsmith's letters to him, but Goldsmith herself preserved her own copies of their correspondence, against Kropotkin's advice.

Goldsmith's thesis on animal perception continued to be cited in scientific publications into the 21st century.

== Selected works ==
=== Books ===
- Les Théories de l'Évolution [The Theories of Evolution] (1909)
- La parthénogénèse naturelle et expérimentale [Natural and experimental parthenogenesis] (1913)
- Réactions physiologiques et psychique des poissons [Physiological and Psychological Reactions of Fish] (1915)
- Revolutionary Syndicalism and Anarchism: Struggle with Capital and Power (Golos truda, 1920)
- La psychologie comparée [Comparative Psychology] (1927)

=== Journal articles ===
- "Quelques réactions sensorielles chez le Pouple" (Comptes Rendus Académie des Sciences, 1917)
- "Une contribution à la question des tropismes" (Bulletin Institut général psychologique, 1922)

=== Essays ===
- "On Organisation" (London Congress of Communist Anarchists, 1906)
- "Revolutionary Syndicalism and the Socialist Party" (London, 1907)
- "Darwinism" (A Sementeira, 1911)
- "Evolution" (Les Temps nouveaux, 1911)
- "The Struggle against Capital and Power: Our Controversial Issues" (London, 1912)
- "The Problems of Tomorrow" (Les Temps Nouveaux, 1919–1920)
- "The Truth about Kronstadt" (Les Temps Nouveaux, 1921)
- "Kropotkin and Russia" (Les Temps Nouveaux, 1921)
- "P. A. Kropotkin – His Attitude Towards the War" (Fraye Arbeter Shtime, 1922)
- "The Moral Face of the Revolution" (Plus Loin, 1925)
- "Marxist Utopia" (Delo truda, 1925)
- "A Few Words about a Confusing Notion" (Plus Loin, 1925)
- "On the Issue of 'Revision'" (Delo truda, 1925–1926)
- "Organisation and the Party" (Plus Loin, 1928)
- "On the Manifesto of the Sixteen" (Plus Loin, 1928)

=== Translations ===
- Historical Letters by Pyotr Lavrov (1903)
- Ethics: Origin and Development by Peter Kropotkin (1927)

== Bibliography ==
- Avrich, Paul (1971) [1967]. The Russian Anarchists. Princeton: Princeton University Press. ISBN 0-691-00766-7. OCLC 1154930946.
- Berry, David (2002). A History of the French Anarchist Movement. Greenwood Press. ISBN 0-313-32026-8.
- Broquet, Thomas; Destombe, Christophe; Valero, Myriam; Jollivet, Didier (2023). "A brief history of speciation research at the Station Biologique de Roscoff (1872-2022)". Cahiers de Biologie Marine. 64 (1): 9–19. doi:10.21411/CBM.A.3DAF598C. ISSN 0007-9723.
- Gillott, David (2017). Samuel Butler against the Professionals: Rethinking Lamarckism 1860-1900. Routledge. ISBN 9781351550185.
- Hough, Søren (2023). "Marie Goldsmith: Scientific Luminary, Anarchist Militant" (PDF). Black Flag Anarchist Review. Vol. 3, no. 2. pp. 89–99. ISSN 0045-2157.
- Howell, Yvonne (1999). "Review of The Conquest of Bread and Other Writings; Anarchistes en exile Correspondance inedite de Pierre Kropotkine a Marie Goldsmith 1897–1917". The Slavic and East European Journal. 43 (2): 396–398. doi:10.2307/309569. ISSN 0037-6752. JSTOR 309569.
- Jablonka, Eva; Lamb, Marion J. (1995). Epigenetic Inheritance and Evolution: The Lamarckian Dimension. Oxford University Press. ISBN 9780198540625.
- La Vergata, Antonello (2023). "Struggles for Existence". Images of the Economy of Nature, 1650-1930. Evolutionary Biology – New Perspectives on Its Development. Vol. 7. Springer. pp. 477–583. doi:10.1007/978-3-031-31023-2_9. ISBN 978-3-031-31023-2.
- Maitron, Jean (2014). "GOLDSMITH Maria Isidorovna [dite Maria Korn ou Corn, Maria Isidine]" [GOLDSMITH Maria Isidorovna [known as Maria Korn or Corn, Maria Isidine]]. Dictionnaire des anarchistes (in French). ISBN 9782708243163.
- Meloni, Maurizio (2016). "Political Biology and the Politics of Epistemology". Political Biology: Science and Social Values in Human Heredity from Eugenics to Epigenetics. Palgrave Macmillan UK. pp. 1–31. ISBN 978-1-137-37771-5.
- Moormann, Emma (2023). Epigenetics and moral responsibilities for health: a philosophical exploration (PhD). University of Antwerp. hdl:10067/1970610151162165141.
- Ogilvie, Marilyn Bailey; Harvey, Joy Dorothy, eds. (2000). "Goldsmith, Marie (1873–1933)". The Biographical Dictionary of Women in Science: Pioneering Lives from Ancient Times to the mid-20th Century. Vol. 1. Routledge. pp. 516–517. ISBN 0-415-92039-6.
- Peters, Victor (1970). Nestor Makhno: The Life of an Anarchist. Winnipeg: Echo Books. OCLC 7925080.
- Purchase, Graham (2003). Peter Kropotkin: Ecologist, Philosopher and Revolutionary (PhD). University of New South Wales.
- Sapp, Jan (1994). Evolution by Association: A History of Symbiosis. Oxford University Press. ISBN 9780195088212.
- Skirda, Alexandre (2002). Facing the enemy: A history of anarchist organisation. Translated by Sharkey, Paul. Oakland: AK Press. ISBN 1902593197. OCLC 490977034.
- Skirda, Alexandre (2004) [1982]. Nestor Makhno–Anarchy's Cossack: The Struggle for Free Soviets in the Ukraine 1917–1921. Translated by Sharkey, Paul. Oakland, California: AK Press. ISBN 978-1-902593-68-5. OCLC 60602979.
- Slatter, John (1994). "The Correspondence of P. A. Kropotkin as Historical Source Material". The Slavonic and East European Review. 72 (2): 277–288. ISSN 0037-6795. JSTOR 4211477.
- Slatter, John (1997). "Review of Anarchistes en exil: Correspondance inedite de Pierre Kropotkine a Marie Goldsmith 1897–1917". The Russian Review. 56 (3): 472. doi:10.2307/131775. ISSN 0036-0341. JSTOR 131775.
- Thorpe, Wayne (2010). "Uneasy Family: Revolutionary Syndicalism in Europe from the Charte d'Amiens to World War I". In Berry, David; Bantman, Constance (eds.). New Perspectives on Anarchism, Labour and Syndicalism: The Individual, the National and the Transnational. Cambridge Scholars Publishing. pp. 16–43. ISBN 978-1-4438-2393-7.
- van der Walt, Lucien; Schmidt, Michael (2009). "Militant Minority: The Question of Anarchist Political Organisation". Black Flame: The Revolutionary Class Politics of Anarchism and Syndicalism. Edinburgh: AK Press. pp. 239–270. ISBN 978-1-904859-16-1. LCCN 2006933558. OCLC 1100238201.
- Woodcock, George; Avakumović, Ivan (1990). Peter Kropotkin: From Prince to Rebel. Montreal: Black Rose Books. ISBN 0-921689-60-8. OCLC 21156316.
- Zimmer, Kenyon (2017). "At war with empire: The anti-colonial roots of American anarchist debates during the First World War". Anarchism, 1914–18. Manchester University Press. doi:10.7765/9781526115768.00016. ISBN 9781526115768.
