= Anarchism in Georgia (country) =

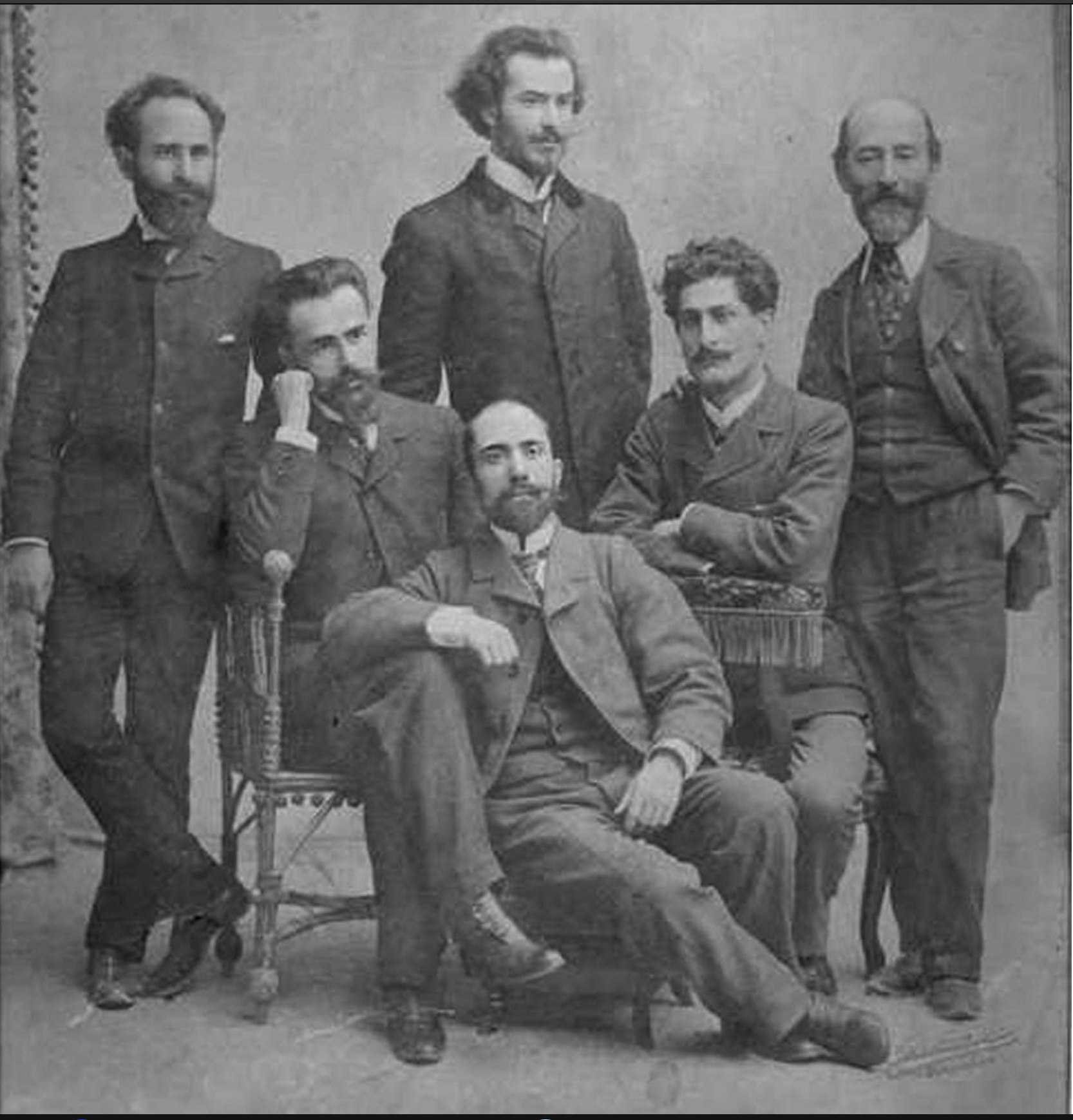
Georgian anarchists. Standing, from left: Sandro Gabunia, Georgy Gogelia, Varlam Cherkezishvili. Sitting: Archil Jorjadze, George Dekanozishvili and Mikheil Tsereteli.

Anarchism in Georgia (Georgian: ანარქიზმი საქართველოში, romanized: anarkizmi sakartveloshi) began to emerge during the late 19th century out of the Georgian national liberation movement and the Russian nihilist movement. It reached its apex during the 1905 Russian Revolution, after a number of anarchists returned from exile to participate in revolutionary activities, such as in the newly established Gurian Republic.

Georgian anarchists Mikheil Tsereteli and Varlam Cherkezishvili played a major role in the development of anarchist ideas in the country, but unlike other European and Russian anarchists, Georgians actively fought for national liberation. This ideology against statehood was supported by those Georgian politicians who led the struggle for the liberation of the Georgian people and fought for national self-determination throughout their lives. As for the anarchist theory of the extinction of the state, the outcry against centralism and for the decentralization of government was the ideal of all progressive-minded people in Georgia and the basis of the country's success. They fought for the autonomy of Georgia, and went even further: in the 1910s they demanded full independence for the country. They defended the slogan of "equality of all nations" and they believed that only after achieving national independence could the nation take care of its social situation.

The Georgian anarchist movement was weakened during World War I, as its Georgian members were working abroad. Following the Russian Revolution, anarchism was no longer a relevant political force. Georgian anarchists still uncompromisingly fought against Leninism, condemning all forms of violence, including its expression as a state. In their view, only free people could achieve progress. They fought against the dictatorship of the proletariat brought by the Red Army invasion of Georgia.

== History ==
As capitalism first spread to Georgia, social stratification began to increase along with the expansion of the working class. During the 19th century, national and class consciousness spread throughout the country, leading to a rise in political organizations advocating for nationalist, liberal and socialist ideas. The "First Group", led by Ilia Chavchavadze, was one of the first Georgian nationalist groups to agitate against Russification policies and advocate for the revival of the Georgian language and the cultivation of Georgian culture. In 1869, this was succeeded by the more radical "Second Group", a liberal political group that engaged in journalism and involved itself in urban and economic life. By 1892, the Second Group too was supplanted by the "Third Group", the country's first social democratic organization, which later evolved into the Social Democratic Party of Georgia - a branch of the Russian Social Democratic Labour Party. During the 2nd Congress of the RSDLP, the party split into two factions: the Bolsheviks, led by Joseph Stalin, and the Mensheviks, led by Noe Zhordania. Nevertheless, both factions took on the position of cosmopolitanism, which aligned them against the interests of the Georgian nationalists.

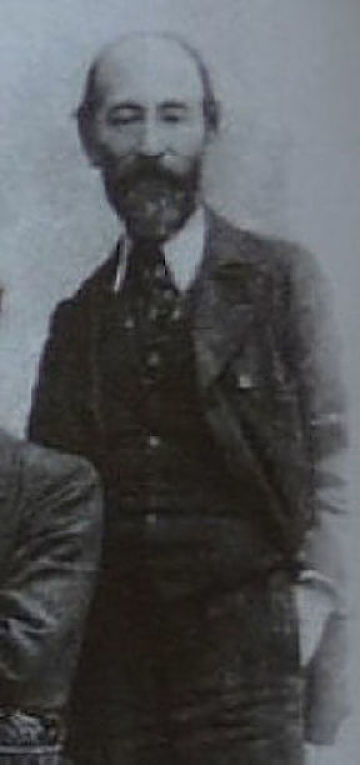
Varlam Cherkezishvili, an early leader of the Georgian anarchist movement and founder of the Georgian Socialist-Federalist Revolutionary Party.

Meanwhile, the nihilist movement was beginning to spread throughout the Russian Empire, attracting the attention of the Georgian socialist Varlam Cherkezishvili. After Dmitry Karakozov's attempt to assassinate Alexander II, Cherkezishvili was arrested and imprisoned for six months in the Peter and Paul Fortress. Upon his release in 1867, Cherkezishvili established a cooperative restaurant in Petrograd, where he met Sergey Nechayev for the first time. By 1868, Cherkezishvili had become influenced by the anarchist ideas of Mikhail Bakunin that he had encountered in the newspaper Narodnoie Delo. Due to his connections to Nechayev, Cherkezishvili was again arrested, this time being sentenced to exile in Western Siberia. He escaped his Siberian exile to Switzerland, where he founded a mutual aid fund and established the Russian language Obchtchina newspaper, while also collaborating on Peter Kropotkin's magazine Le Révolté. A number of other Georgian radicals had also gone abroad for their education, where many were first exposed to the ideas of anarchism and libertarian communism. In 1900, the Group of Russian Anarchists Abroad was founded in Geneva by the Georgian anarchist Georgy Gogelia, eventually being succeeded by the Bread and Freedom organization, which was joined by Peter Kropotkin and Varlam Cherkezishvili.

=== First Revolution ===
At the turn of the 20th century, anarchist and socialist ideas were beginning to flourish in Georgia, as a number of radical activists started to return from exile. In May 1902, the Gurian Republic was proclaimed as the result of a peasants' uprising in the Guria region, supported by Mensheviks as well as socialist revolutionaries such as Nestor Kalandarishvili. The situation culminated with the outbreak of the 1905 Russian Revolution, during which many of the exiled anarchists returned to Georgia. It was at this time that a number of Georgian anarcho-communists, including Varlam Cherkezishvili, collaborated in the establishment of the Georgian Socialist-Federalist Revolutionary Party, which demanded the autonomy of Georgia within a Russian federation organized along democratic socialist lines. In the first legislative election, the Socialist-Federalist Iosif Baratov won a seat in the State Duma. In the second legislative election, the Socialist-Federalists were even able to win a majority of Georgian seats to the Duma.

The return of Georgian anarchists from exile marked the apex of the anarchist movement in the country, spearheaded by Georgy Gogelia, Mikheil Tsereteli and Varlam Cherkezishvili, who advocated for the implementation of a libertarian socialist system without the use of a state. Inspired by the idea of federalism, Cherkezishvili established a "People's University" in Tiflis, where lectures and classes were given in Russian, Georgian, Armenian and Azerbaijani. According to Max Nettlau, "the administration of the People's University of Tbilisi was entirely in the hands of the workers and each nationality organized its own autonomous section, each month the sections meet to discuss general issues. Cherkezishvili's idea was to re-establish, in practice, solidarity among the nationalities which, a few months before, thanks to the instigations of the Russian government, had been severely shaken by the Armenian-Tartar massacres."

During the revolutionary period, a number of anarchist newspapers also went into legal publication in Tiflis. In May 1906, Georgy Gogelia edited the anarcho-communist newspaper Golos, which published seven daily issues in the Georgian language before closing due to a lack of subscribers. He then went on to edit the Nabat, which published fourteen twice-daily issues in the Georgian language before it was forcibly shut down by censors. In June 1906, Gogelia came together with Mikheil Tsereteli and Varlam Cherkezishvili to edit the Worker newspaper, which published 52 daily issues in the Georgian language up until September 1906, when publication was discontinued due to opposition by the Social Democrats. Cherkezishvili then went on to edit the Race newspaper, which was also published legally in the Georgian language, but was accused of promoting Georgian nationalism by orthodox anarchists. Anarcho-communists were also on the editorial staff of Patara Gazeti and later Arrow, the Georgian language newspapers published by the Georgian Socialist-Federalist Revolutionary Party, which were intended for distribution among the peasantry. Legal publication of anarchist newspapers largely ceased with the end of the Revolution in June 1907, as radical elements were driven underground.

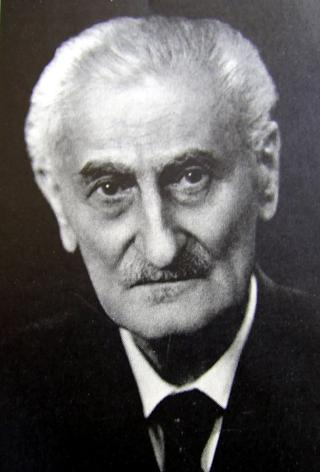
Mikheil Tsereteli, a leader of the Georgian anarchist movement and later a government official of the Democratic Republic of Georgia.

Georgian anarchists were once again forced into exile, where Varlam Cherkezishvili presented the "Petition of the Georgian People" to the Hague Convention of 1907, and collaborated in the establishment of the Anarchist Black Cross, designed to provide aid to anarchist political prisoners. With the outbreak of World War I, Georgian anarchists were split by the issue of support for one side or the other. Cherkezishvili was among the signatories of the Manifesto of the Sixteen, which advocated for an Allied victory over the Central Powers. Meanwhile, Mikheil Tsereteli established the Committee of Independent Georgia, which aimed to establish Georgian independence from the Russian Empire through collaboration with the Central Powers. During the Caucasus campaign, the Georgian Committee attempted to recruit dissident Georgians to rebel against the Russian Empire, with Tsereteli even traveling to Georgia in secret in order to meet with the Menshevik leader Noe Zhordania, but the Mensheviks still maintained their stance of neutrality. Nevertheless, the Committee succeeded in recruiting a number of dissidents to join the Georgian Legion, which fought on the side of the Central Powers.

=== Second Revolution ===
Following the collapse of relations between the Committee and the Ottoman Empire, combined with the political amnesty brought on by the February Revolution, the Georgian Legion was disbanded and Georgian dissidents (including anarchists) began to return from exile to the country, now under the control of the Special Transcaucasian Committee - led by Vasily Kharlamov, a member of the Constitutional Democratic Party and a former Don Cossack. Following the October Revolution, the Georgian Socialist-Federalists failed to win a single seat in the first election to the Russian Constituent Assembly, only gaining 0.93% of the vote in the Transcaucasus. However, the Bolshevik-controlled All-Russian Central Executive Committee soon ordered the dissolution of the Assembly, convening in its place the Third All-Russian Congress of Workers', Soldiers' and Peasants Deputies' Soviets, during which the Georgian Bolshevik Joseph Stalin outlined the new Soviet policy on nationalities, providing a program of autonomy and federalism for non-Russian territories. The Council of People's Commissars subsequently negotiated the Treaty of Brest-Litovsk with the Central Powers, ceding territory in Transcaucasia to the Ottoman Empire. The Transcaucasian Commissariat, led by the Georgian Menshevik Nikolay Chkheidze, responded by declaring the independence of the South Caucasus from Russia - establishing the Transcaucasian Democratic Federative Republic. Due to the pressures of the renewed Ottoman offensive, the federative republic was short-lived, breaking up into the Democratic Republics of Georgia, Armenia and Azerbaijan.

With the Democratic Republic of Georgia being recognized by the Central Powers, the German Empire subsequently launched an expedition into the Caucasus, in order to stabilize the new Georgian Republic in the face of aggression by the new Russian Soviet Federative Socialist Republic. But after the Treaty of Versailles, German forces were replaced by the British Empire, which itself occupied Georgia.

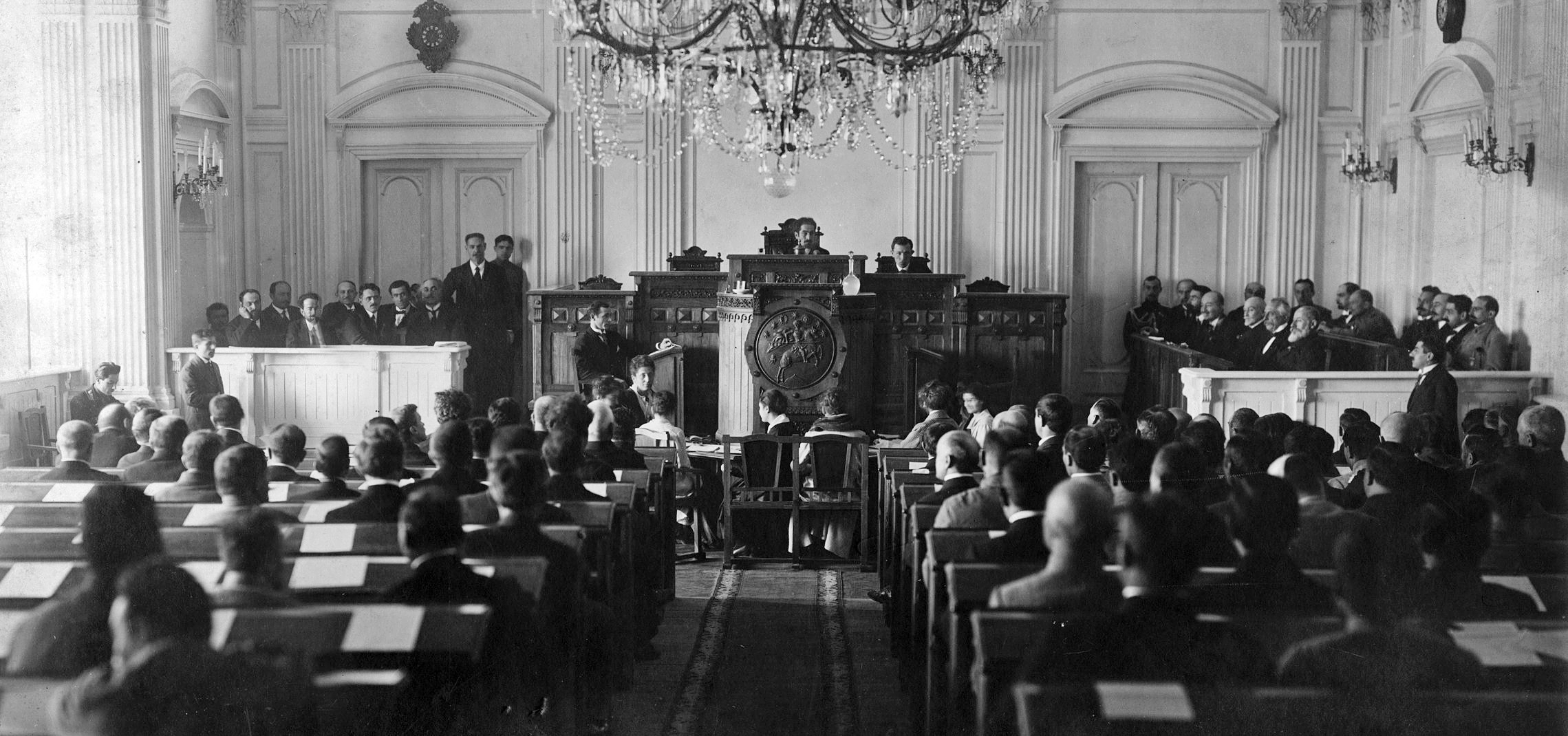
An inaugurating session of the Constituent Assembly of Georgia.

Although anarchism as a distinct movement had largely ceased to be a relevant political force in Georgia, a number of anarchists held key positions in the Democratic Republic, with Mikheil Tsereteli becoming the first Georgian ambassador to Sweden and Norway, before later teaching as a professor in Tbilisi State University. In the first election to the new Constituent Assembly of Georgia, the Socialist-Federalists won 8 seats, one of which was held by Varlam Cherkezishvili.

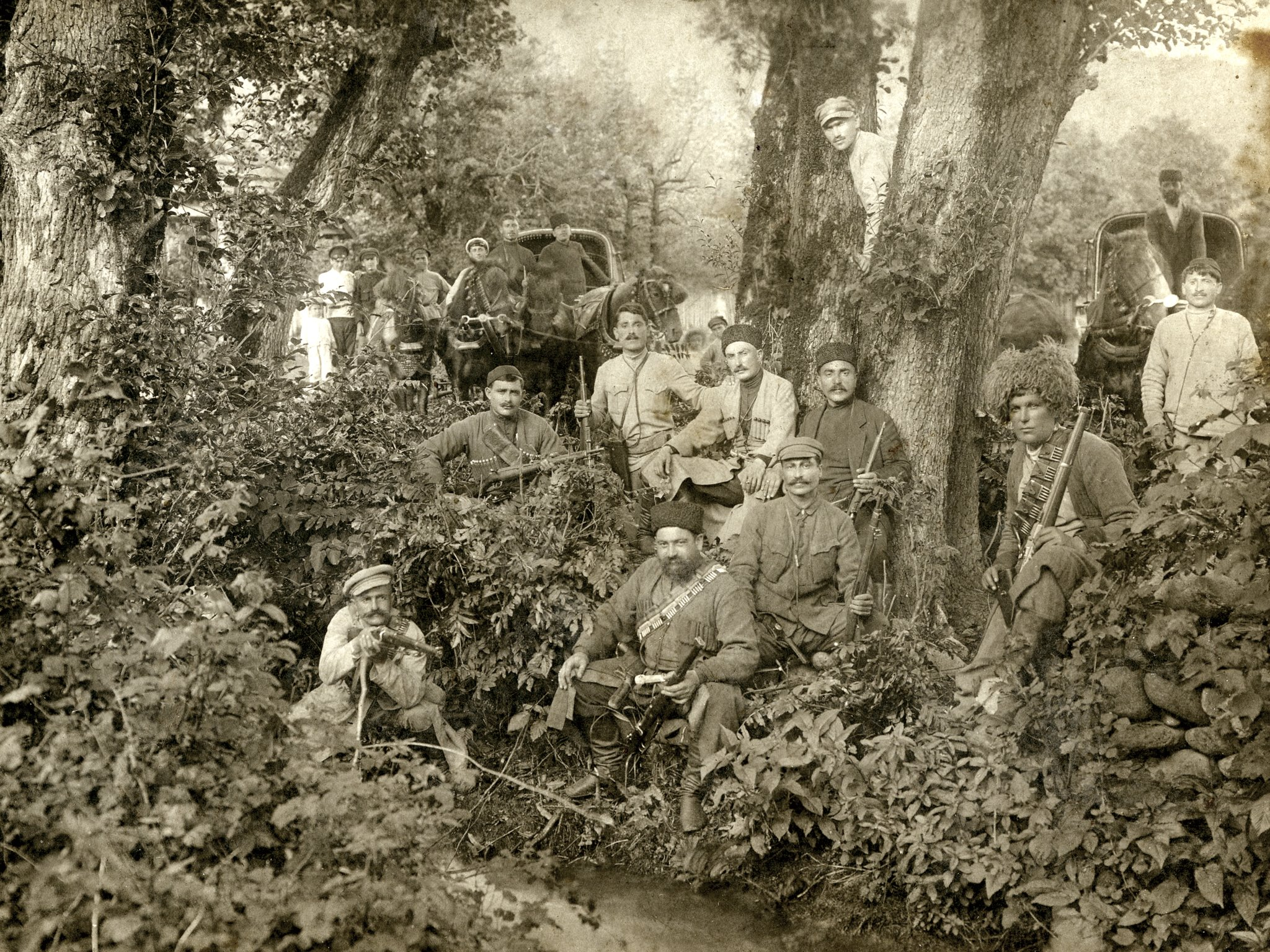
Georgian rebels known as "Oath of Fealty" (შეფიცულები) under the command of Kakutsa Cholokashvili, during the August Uprising.

In February 1921, the Red Army launched an invasion of Georgia which brought an end to the Democratic Republic, with the Georgian Soviet Socialist Republic being established in its place. At its last session the Constituent Assembly voted to establish a government-in-exile before fleeing the country to Europe. Tsereteli emigrated to Belgium, where he became a teacher at the Free University of Brussels. Cherkezishvili returned to London, where he continued to agitate for Georgian independence and resistance to the newly established Soviet Union. The Soviet government was unpopular in Georgia and faced the prospect of an insurrection against its rule from its inception. Even those members of the working class that were the most sympathetic towards Bolshevik ideology were opposed to the new government, due to the subordination of workers' organizations and trade unions to Bolshevik committees, as well as the centralization of power in Moscow. An internal conflict within the Georgian Bolsheviks over the question of national autonomy ended with the defeat of the "national deviationists" (led by Filipp Makharadze and Polikarp Mdivani) by the "hardliners" (led by Joseph Stalin and Sergo Ordzhonikidze), who advocated for greater centralized rule of Georgia under the Transcaucasian Socialist Federative Soviet Republic. The Bolsheviks subsequently ordered the forcible dissolution of all opposition parties, in order to cement power in a one-party state.

Many of the opposition parties, including both the Socialist-Federalists and the Mensheviks, continued to operate underground - coming together to form the Committee for the Independence of Georgia in order to organize resistance to Soviet rule. A number of dissident Georgians returned to the country clandestinely, in order to participate in a planned uprising against the Bolshevik government. Despite the arrest and execution of many of its leading members by the Cheka, the Committee went ahead with its plans and launched the August Uprising, which was quickly suppressed by the government forces. In the "unprecedented" repression that followed, the last holdouts of opposition to the Bolshevik government were defeated, bringing an end to any dissident socialist currents - including Menshevism, Socialist-Federalism and anarchism.

== See also ==
- Category:Anarchists from Georgia (country)
- List of anarchist movements by region
- Anarchism in Armenia
- Anarchism in Azerbaijan
- Anarchism in Russia

== Bibliography ==
- Rekhviashvili, T.; Chiaureli, V. (2006). ფილოსოფია (in Georgian). Tbilisi. p. 233.
- Gvianishvili, Nanuli Valerianovna (1990). Mesto sot︠s︡ialʹno-politicheskikh vozzreniĭ anarkhistov v istorii gruzinskoĭ obshchestvennoĭ mysli (in Russian). Tbilisi: Institut istorii, arkheologii i ėtnografii. p. 17. OCLC 30869691.
- Stalin, Joseph (1954) [1906/1907]. Anarchism or Socialism?. Collected Works. Vol. 1. Foreign Languages Publishing House. OCLC 500187899.
