= Anarchism or Socialism? =

1906/1907 work by Joseph Stalin

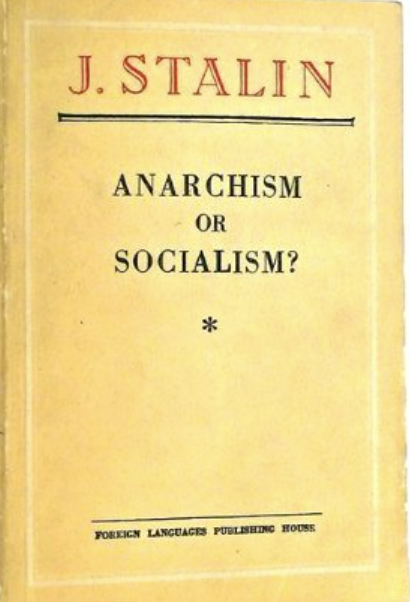
- Author: Joseph Stalin
- Original title: Анархизм или социализм?
- Language: Russian
- Genre: Political philosophy
- Publication date: 1906
- Publication place: Soviet Union
- Media type: Print

Anarchism or Socialism? is a 1906/1907 work by Soviet leader Joseph Stalin in Georgian, first published in Russian in 1946. The work sought to analyze anarchism using Marxist methods.

== Background ==
The composition of this work was developed in the years following the failed 1905 Russian Revolution; Stalin at this period of time adopted a strong Marxist ideology. The philosophy of anarchism played a significant role in Russian history, with numerous notable Russian anarchists, such as Mikhail Bakunin, Emma Goldman, Peter Kropotkin, and Leo Tolstoy. At the time anarchists in Georgia were engaged in an ideological campaign against Marxists in the Caucasus, and Stalin was made responsible for Bolshevik operations in the Caucasus region.

== History of publication ==
The articles that became Anarchism or Socialism began as a series of newspaper articles written in Georgian. The first four articles were published in their original form in the daily Bolshevik newspaper ახალი ცხოვრება ("New Life") published in Tbilisi, under the direction of Stalin, in June–July 1906. The series continued to be published in ჩვენი ცხოვრება ("Our Life") from February 1907 to its closure on 6 March 1907, and then in დრო ("Time") in April 1907. In 1946, it was republished in Russian in the first volume of Stalin's Collected Works.

Stephen Kotkin claims that Stalin plagiarized the work from Giorgi Teliya, a Georgian railway worker.

== Synopsis ==
The work focuses on Stalin's criticism of the philosophy of anarchism and responses to anarchist criticisms of Marxists. According to Stalin, anarchists had no support among the working class, but they had some success outside the workers and among petite bourgeoisie groups.

In the work Stalin refutes the Georgian anarchists who argued that dialectics denied people the ability to "jump out of oneself" (Note: or jump over oneself) by arguing that "jumping out of oneself" (Note: or jumping over oneself) is a task for wild goats while dialectics serves humans.

== See also ==
- List of books about anarchism
- Anarcho-communism
- Marxism–Leninism
- Vladimir Lenin bibliography
