= Internationalist Revolutionary Socialist Students =

- Étudiants socialistes révolutionnaires internationalistes
- Abbreviation: ESRI
- Formation: 25 December 1891; 134 years ago
- Dissolved: 1903; 123 years ago
- Type: Study group
- Headquarters: 89 Rue Mouffetard
- Location: Paris, France
- General Secretary: Pierre Monatte (last)

The Internationalist Revolutionary Socialist Students (French: Étudiants socialistes révolutionnaires internationalistes; ESRI) were a revolutionary socialist study group based in Paris during the 1890s.

== History ==
In the early 1890s, a new generation of young intellectuals in France, unsatisfied with the predominant culture of French society, came under the influence of anarchism, socialism and syndicalism while studying at university. In 1892, a group of university students, who described themselves as the "intellectual proletariat", established the International Revolutionary Socialist Students (French: Étudiants socialistes révolutionnaires internationalistes; ESRI). At a national students' congress the following year, the ESRI issued a manifesto calling for students to join the "intellectual proletariat" and "rebel against all orders of exploiters".

The group considered "study, propaganda and socialist action" to be its main objectives. The ESRI studied the works of Karl Marx, some of which were rather obscure at the time, and their meetings were frequented by the syndicalist Georges Sorel. The group championed proletarian internationalism and opened itself to workers and students from any country; half of its members would consist of foreign-born exiles from Romania, Russia and Poland. The group grew in strength following a series of riots in the Latin Quarter, which had been provoked following the arrest of a student at the École des Beaux-Arts in July 1893. Confrontations between students and the police brought the student movement into close contact with the organised labour movement, which united against the French state.

Although initially a multi-tendency organisation, by 1897, Marie Goldsmith and Léon Rémy had influenced the ESRI to take a more staunchly anarchist position. Goldsmith also directed the publication of a series of pamphlets by the organisation, which wrote on subjects such as anarchist feminism and anti-Zionism, all signed collectively under the organisation's initials. The group's headquarters were at 89 Rue Mouffetard, close by the offices of Jean Grave's newspaper Le Révolté. Several members of the ESRI, including Goldsmith, Rémy, Marc Pierrot and Georges Willaume, contributed to Grave's publications. In the group's 1897 pamphlet Misère et mortalité, published by Jean Allemane, a physician drew attention to how poor working conditions and overwork threatened workers' health by weakening their bodies and immune systems.

By 1903, the ESRI had dissolved. Its last secretary was Pierre Monatte.

== Members ==
- Jules-Louis Breton
- Christiaan Cornelissen
- George Diamandy
- Marie Goldsmith
- Pierre Monatte
- Marc Pierrot
- Léon Rémy
- Alfred Rosmer
- Georges Sorel
- Georges Willaume
- Alexandre Zévaès

== Publications ==
- Misère et mortalité [Misery and Mortality] (1897), no. 6
- Les anarchistes et les syndicats [The Anarchists and the Trade Unions] (1898), no. 8

== Bibliography ==
- Bantman, Constance (2021). "A Sedentary Transnationalist (1885–1892)". Jean Grave and the Networks of French Anarchism, 1854-1939. Palgrave Studies in the History of Social Movements. Palgrave Macmillan. pp. 47–76. doi:10.1007/978-3-030-66618-7_3.
- Barnes, David S. (2000). "Historical perspectives on the etiology of tuberculosis". Microbes and Infection. 2 (4): 431–440. doi:10.1016/S1286-4579(00)00323-3.
- Ducange, Jean-Numa (2023). "The Socialists' Marx: The Guesde-Jaurès Moment". In Ducange, Jean-Numa; Burlaud, Anthony (eds.). Marx, a French Passion. Translated by Broder, David. Brill. pp. 27–38. doi:10.1163/9789004533547_004. ISBN 9789004533547.
- Fournier, Marcel (2006). Marcel Mauss: A Biography. Princeton University Press. ISBN 9780691117775.
- Hough, Søren (2023). "Marie Goldsmith: Scientific Luminary, Anarchist Militant" (PDF). Black Flag Anarchist Review. Vol. 3, no. 2. pp. 89–99. ISSN 0045-2157.
- Leberstein, Stephen (1999). "Schools of Revolt: Syndicalist Education and Workers' Culture in Pre‐World War I France". Paedagogica Historica. 35 (1): 23–39. doi:10.1080/0030923990350103.
