= Varlam Cherkezishvili =

Georgian aristocrat, journalist, and anarchist (1846–1925)

Tavadi Varlam Cherkezishvili
- ვარლამ ჩერქეზიშვილი
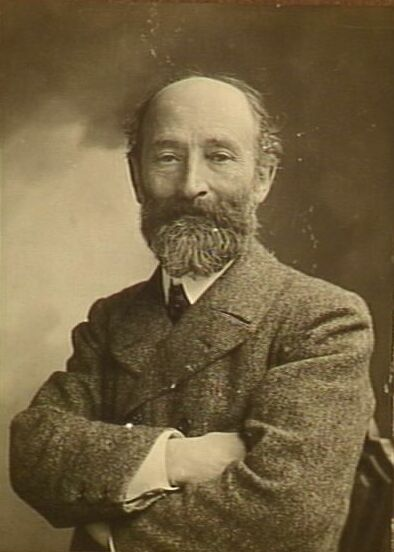
- Cherkezishvili c. 1905, taken by Nadar
- Born: 15 September 1846; Tokhliaur, Telavi, Tiflis, Russian Empire (today in Kakheti, Georgia)
- Died: 18 August 1925 (aged 78); London, United Kingdom
- Movement: Anarchism; Georgian nationalism
- Spouse: Katherina Friederike Dorothea Rupertus (m. 1906)
- Family: Cherkezishvili

Varlam Nikolozis dze Cherkezishvili (Georgian: ვარლამ ნიკოლოზის ძე ჩერქეზიშვილი; (Note: Also known by the Russian: Варлаам Николаевич Черкезов, romanized: Varlaam Nikolaevich Cherkezov; as during the time of the Russian Empire, it was common for Georgian names to be Russified.) 15 September 1846 – 18 August 1925) was a Georgian aristocrat and journalist involved in Georgian anarchist and national liberation movements.

== Biography ==
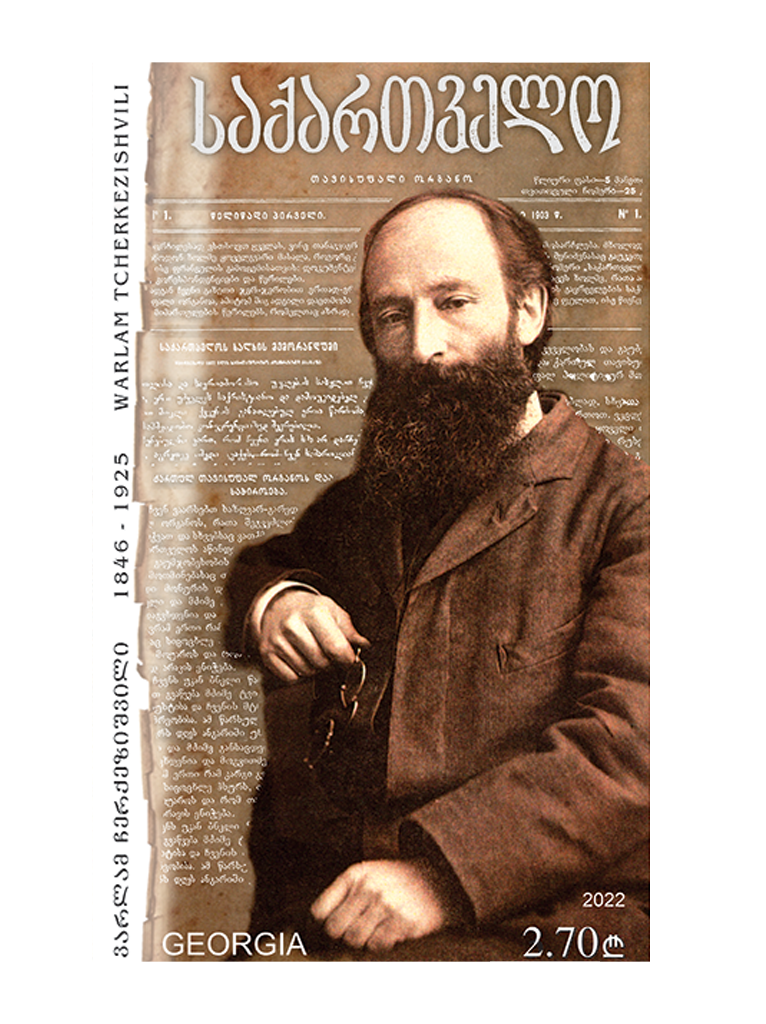
Varlam Cherkezishvili on a 2022 stamp of Georgia

Born in Kakheti in 1846, Cherkezishvili went to study in St. Petersburg, where he Dmitry Karakozov and joined Sergey Nechayev's nihilist group, becoming one of Georgia's first "professional revolutionaries". For his radical activities, Cherkezishvili was tried and sentenced to penal labour in Siberia, but he escaped in 1876 and fled to Switzerland. In exile, he initially became involved with the Russian emigre movement, but split with them over his support for Georgian independence. This attracted him towards anarchism, due to its promise of self-determination for small nations, and he became a disciple of the Russian anarchist Peter Kropotkin. But his new-found anarchism also brought him into disagreement with other Georgian nationalists, such as Noe Zhordania, who he met in London in 1897.

In 1903, Kropotkin and Cherkezishvili joined Georgy Gogelia's Bread and Freedom group, established in order to distribute anarchist literature clandestinely throughout the Russian Empire. They quickly attracted a following and received numerous requests for more literature to be sent, gaining particular popularity in areas of the Pale of Settlement, such as Poland and Ukraine. Cherkezishvili himself contributed to the publication, penning a critical analysis of Marxism. In the wake of the Russian Revolution of 1905, Cherkezishvili, Gogelia and Kropotkin helped launched Mikheil Tsereteli's anarchist periodical Nobati in Tbilisi, contributing critiques of state socialism in an attempt to bring the Georgian revolutionary movement over to anarchism. But during their brief period of conflict with the social democrats, to which a young Joseph Stalin contributed critiques of anarchism, they were unable to build a popular organization and the Georgian anarchist movement slowly diminished.

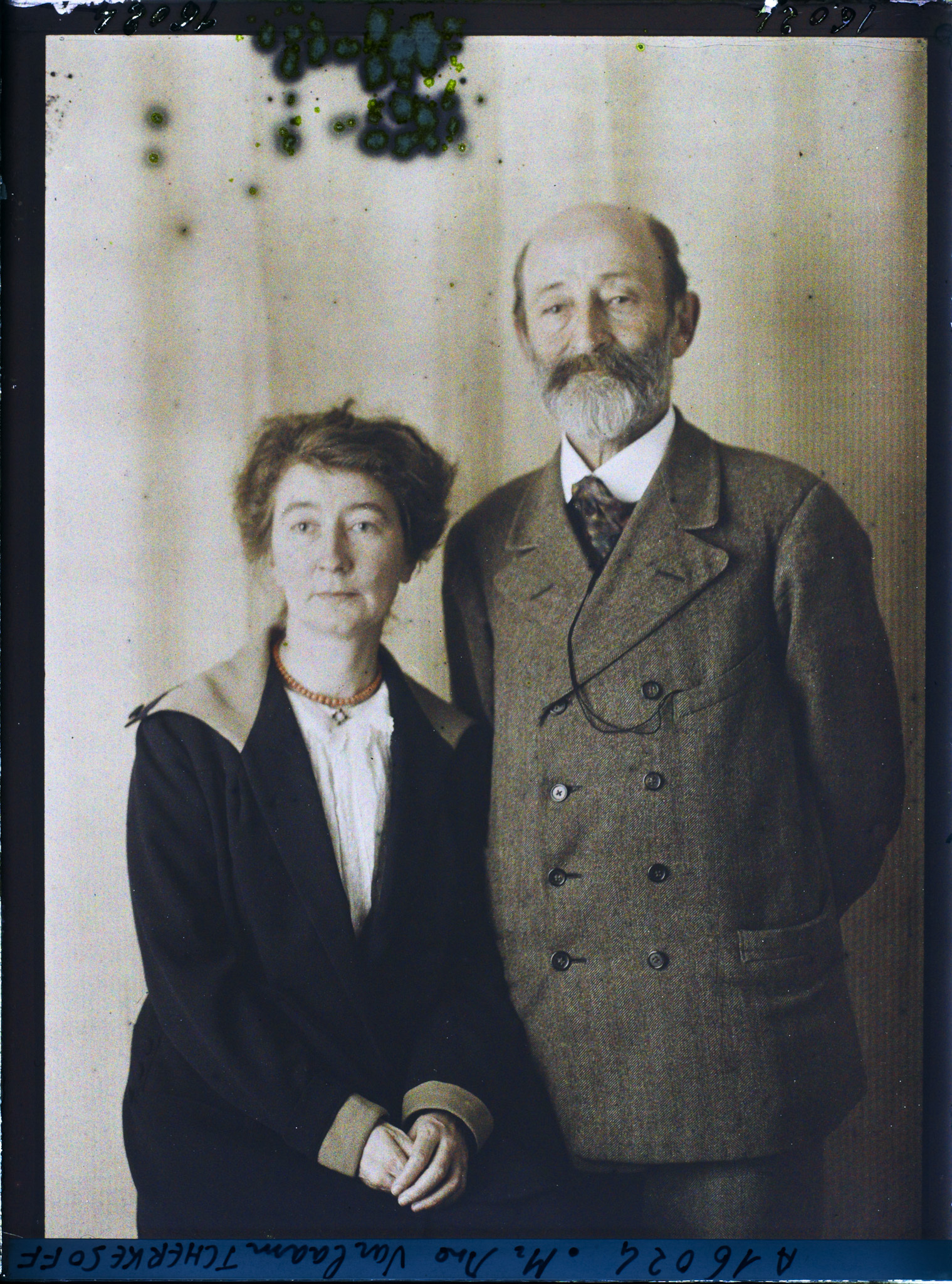
Autochrome of Cherkezishvili with his Wife Freda Rupertus by Auguste Léon, 1919

In 1907, Cherkezishvili, alongside Peter Kropotkin, Rudolf Rocker and Alexander Schapiro, helped organize the London Anarchist Red Cross, in order to aid political prisoners of the Russian Empire. The organization collected money and clothing, which they sent to prisoners in Russia, and circulated petitions in protest against the political repression in the Russian Empire. That year, Cherkezishvili himself presented a petition for Georgian independence to the Hague Peace Conference, but it failed to garner any support. During this period, Cherkezishvili and Kropotkin often spoke at the Federation of Jewish Anarchists' Jubilee Street Club.

When Kropotkin expressed support for the Allies of World War I, he was backed up by Cherkezishvili. In 1916, Cherkezishvili and Kropotkin, along with Jean Grave, Charles Malato, Christian Cornelissen, James Guillaume and ten others, signed the Manifesto of the Sixteen in support of the Allied war effort. For this, they were fiercely criticised by anarchists of the internationalist position, including their former associate Georgy Gogelia, who denounced them as "anarcho-patriots".

With the outbreak of the Russian Revolution in 1917, Cherkezishvili returned to Georgia, where he reunited with Gogelia and gradually fell out of contact with Kropotkin. Following the deaths of Kropotkin and Gogelia, Cherkezishvili returned to London, where he died in 1925.

== Bibliography ==
- Avrich, Paul (1971) [1967]. The Russian Anarchists. Princeton: Princeton University Press. ISBN 0-691-00766-7. OCLC 1154930946.
- Lang, David Marshall (1962). "A Georgian anarchist". A Modern History of Soviet Georgia. Grove Press. LCCN 62-13057. OCLC 398597.
