= Yves Delage =

French zoologist (1854–1920)

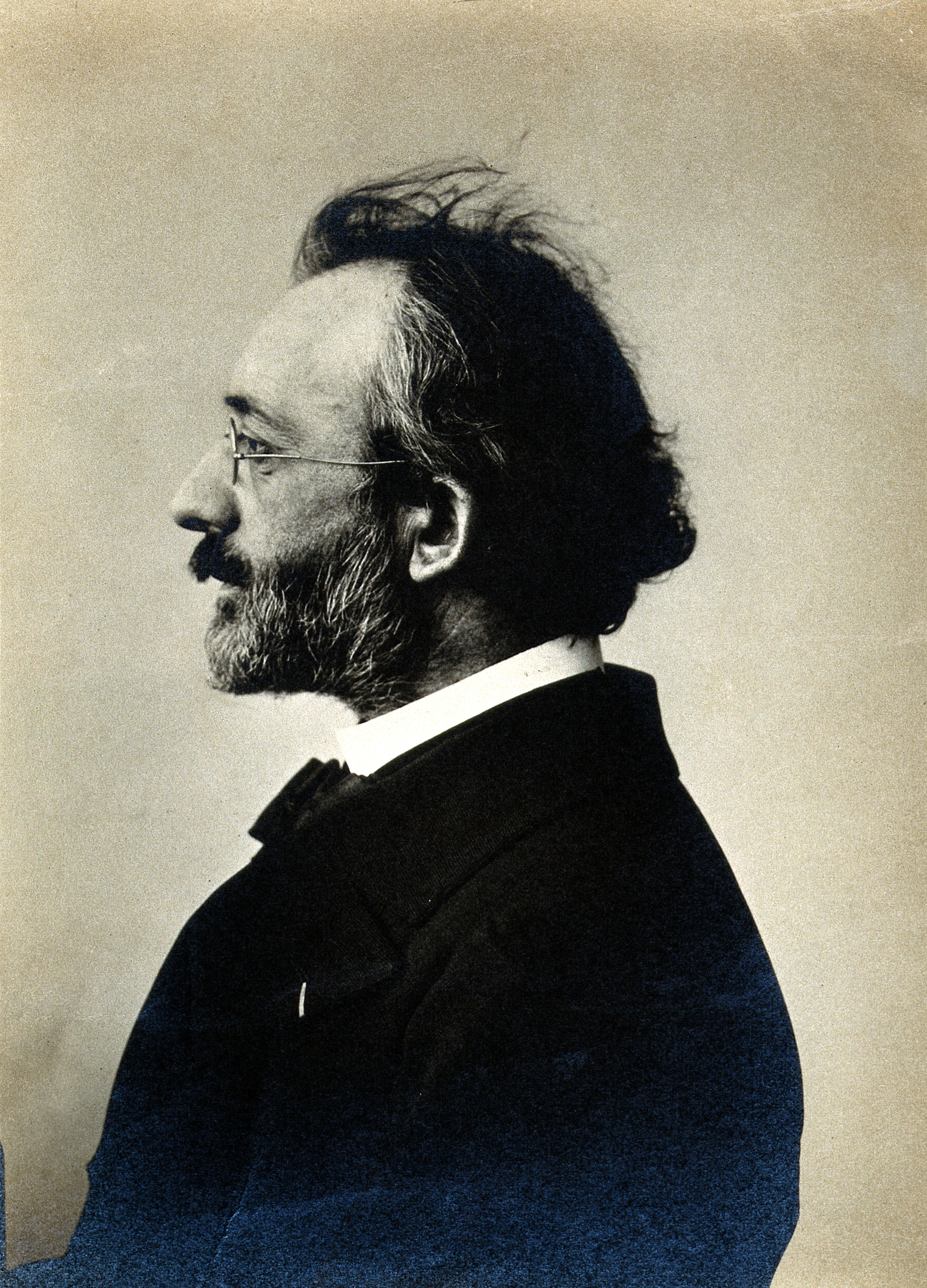
- Delage, c. 1910s
- Born: 13 May 1854; Avignon, France
- Died: 7 October 1920 (aged 66); Sceaux, France
- Scientific career
- Fields: Zoology

Yves Delage (13 May 1854 – 7 October 1920) was a French zoologist known for his work into invertebrate physiology and anatomy. He also discovered the function of the semicircular canals in the inner ear. He is also famous for noting and preparing a speech on the Turin Shroud, arguing in favour of its authenticity. Delage estimated the probability that the image on the shroud was not caused by the body of Jesus Christ as 1 in 10 billion.

== Life ==
He was born in Avignon on 13 May 1854. He became the director of the Station Biologique de Roscoff in 1901. From 1902 he was Professor of Zoology at the Sorbonne University in Paris. Delage performed influential experiments on the fertilization of sea urchin egg. He was elected an International Member of the American Philosophical Society in 1905.

Delage was a critic of Darwinism. He argued for a version of neo-Lamarckism.

== Publications ==
- L’Appareil circulatoire des crustacés édriophalmes (1881)
- Contribution à l'étude de l'appareil circulatoire des crustacés édriophthalmes marins (1881)
- Évolution de la sacculine (1884)
- Sur le système nerveux et sur quelques autres points de l'organisation du Peltogaster (1886)
- Embryogénie des éponges (1892)
- Faune de Cynthiadées de Roscoff et des côtes de Bretagne (1893)
- L’Hérédité et les grands problèmes de la biologie générale (1895)
- Traité de zoologie concrète (six volumes, 1896–1903)
- La Nature des images hypnagogiques et le rôle des lueurs entoptiques dans le rêve (1903)
- Les Théories de l’évolution (1909)
- Comment pensent les bêtes (1911)
- La Parthénogénèse naturelle et expérimentale (1913), with Marie Goldsmith (secrétaire de L'Année biologique); chez Ernest Flammarion, 342 pages
- The Theories of Evolution (1913)
- Le Mendélisme et le mécanisme cytologique de l'hérédité (1919)
- Le Rêve (1920)
