= Station biologique de Roscoff =

French marine biology and oceanography research and teaching center

Coordinates: 48.727°N 3.987°W

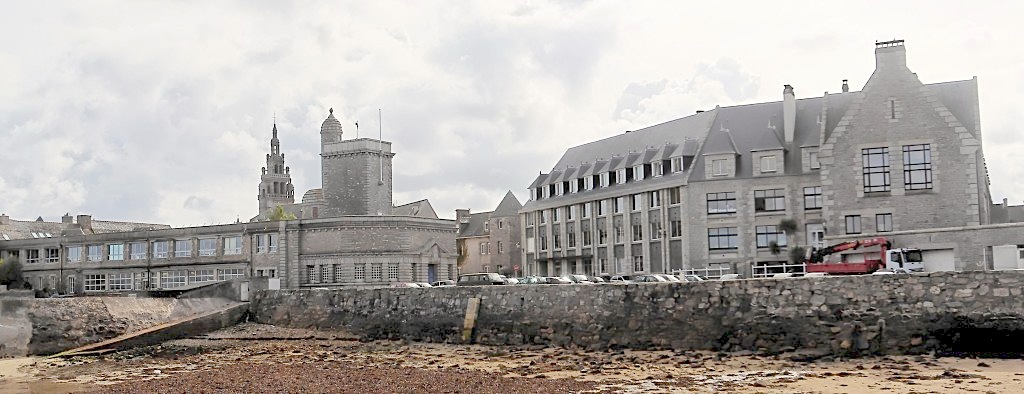
Station biologique de Roscoff

The Station biologique de Roscoff (SBR) is a French marine biology and oceanography research and teaching center. Founded by Henri de Lacaze-Duthiers (1821–1901) in 1872, it is at the present time affiliated to the Sorbonne Faculty of Science and Engineering (part of Sorbonne University) and the Centre National de la Recherche Scientifique (CNRS).

== Overview ==
The Station biologique is situated in Roscoff on the northern coast of Brittany (France) about 60 km east of Brest. Its location offers access to exceptional variety of biotopes, most of which are accessible at low tide. These biotopes support a large variety of both plant (700) and animal (3000) marine species. Founded in 1872 by Professor Henri de Lacaze-Duthiers (then Zoology Chair at the Sorbonne University ), the SBR constitutes, since March 1985, the Internal School 937 of the Pierre and Marie Curie University (UPMC). In November 1985, the SBR was given the status of Oceanographic Observatory by the Institut National des Sciences de l'Univers et de l'Environnement (National Institute for the Cosmological and Environmental Sciences; INSU). The SBR is also, since January 2001, a Research Federation within the Life Sciences Department of the CNRS.

The personnel of the SBR, which includes about 200 permanent staff, consists of scientists, teaching scientists, technicians, postdoctoral fellows, PhD students and administrative staff. These personnel is organized into various research groups within research units that are recognised by the Life Sciences Department of the CNRS (the current research units have the following codes: FR 2424, UMR 8227, UMR 7144, UMI 3614 and USR 3151). The various research groups work on a wide range of topics, ranging from investigation of the fine structure and function of biological macromolecules to global oceanic studies. Genomic approaches constitute an important part of many of the research programmes, notably via the European Network of Excellence "Marine Genomics" which is coordinated by the SBR. With the accommodation facilities at its hotel and its teaching facilities and equipment, the SBR provides conditions for teaching a range of subjects including zoology, phycology and coastal oceanography. Teaching at the SBR includes courses that form part of the UPMC Master's program and the European Socrates. The SBR is part of the network "BioGenOuest" and gives access to different technological platforms as sequencing, mass spectrometry, microscopy and bioinformatics. The station publishes (since 1960) a bilingual scientific journal, the Cahiers de Biologie Marine (CBM). The SBR also hosts between 12 and 15 national and international conferences per year, including the Jacques Monod Conferences.

== History ==
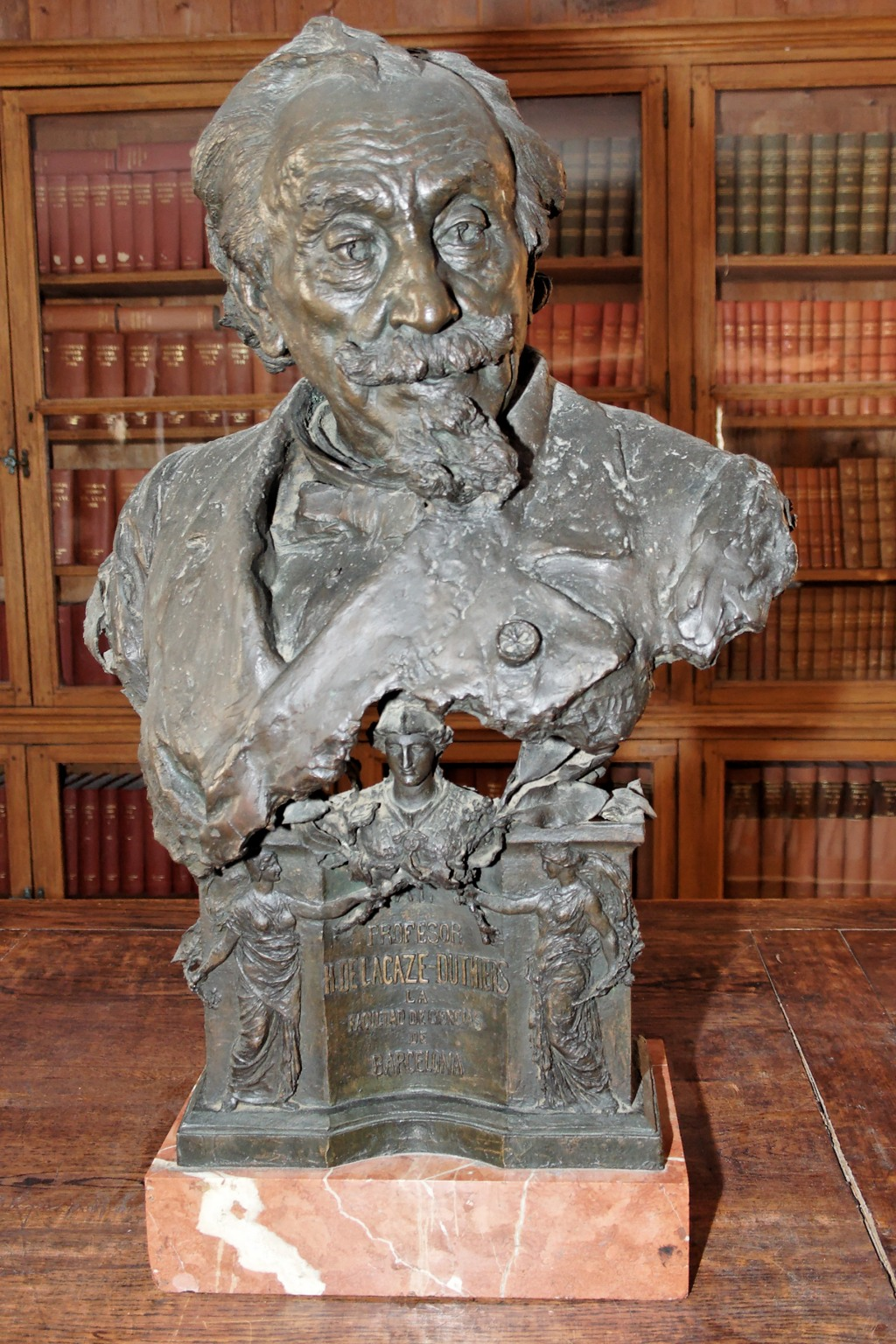
Henri de Lacaze-Duthiers, founder of the Roscoff Station

Directors of the Station biologique de Roscoff
Name	Start	End
Henri de Lacaze-Duthiers	1872	1901
Yves Delage	1901	1920
Charles Pérez	1921	1945
Georges Teissier	1945	1971
Joseph Bergerard	1971	1981
Interim (Louis Cabioch, Pierre Guerrier)	1981	1982
Pierre Lasserre	1983	1993
André Toulmond	1993	2003
Bernard Kloareg	2004	2018
Catherine Boyen	2019	present

== Gallery ==
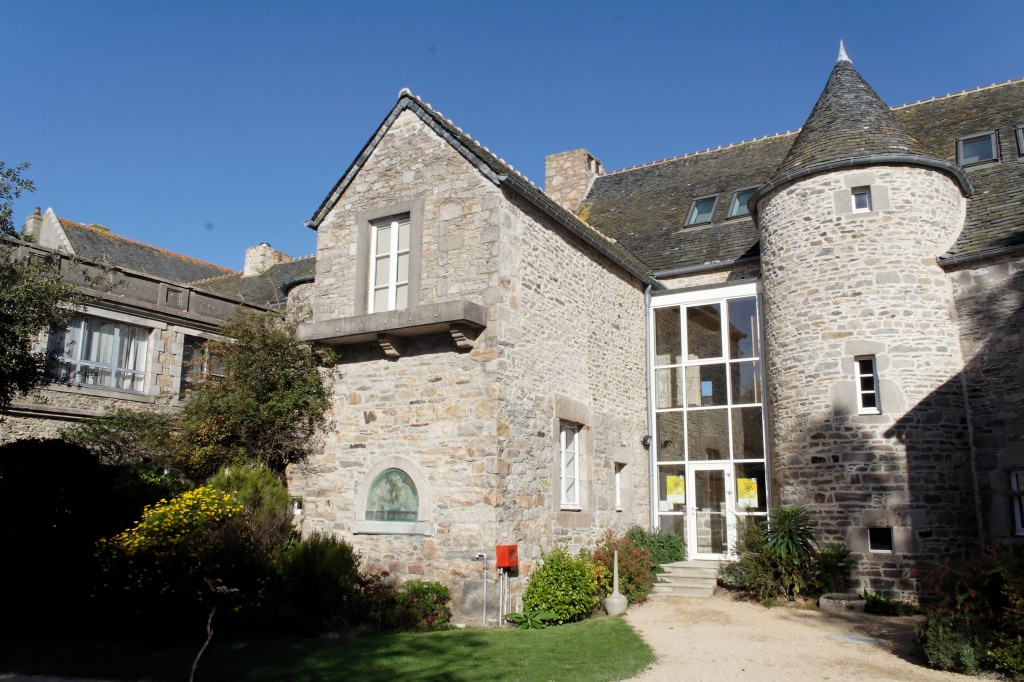
Lacaze-Duthiers laboratory

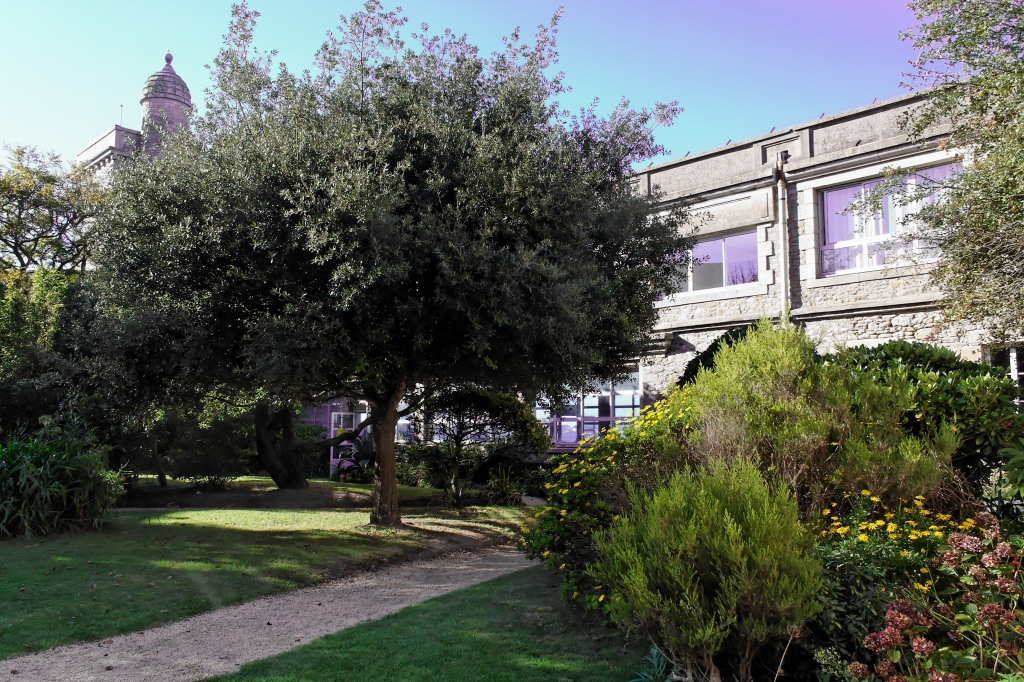
Garden

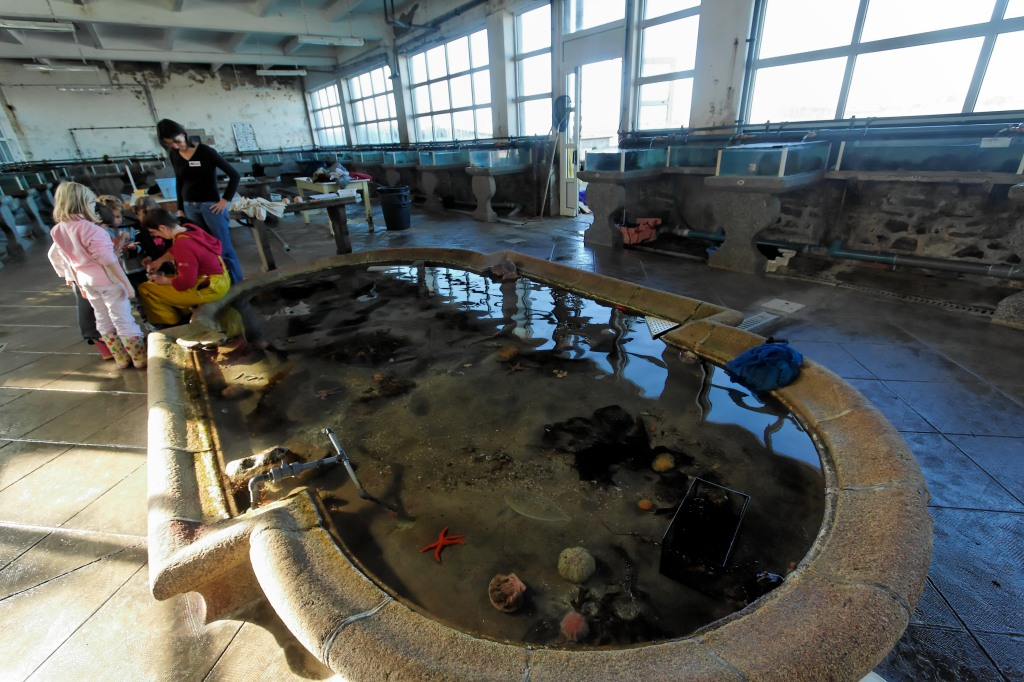
Aquarium de recherche

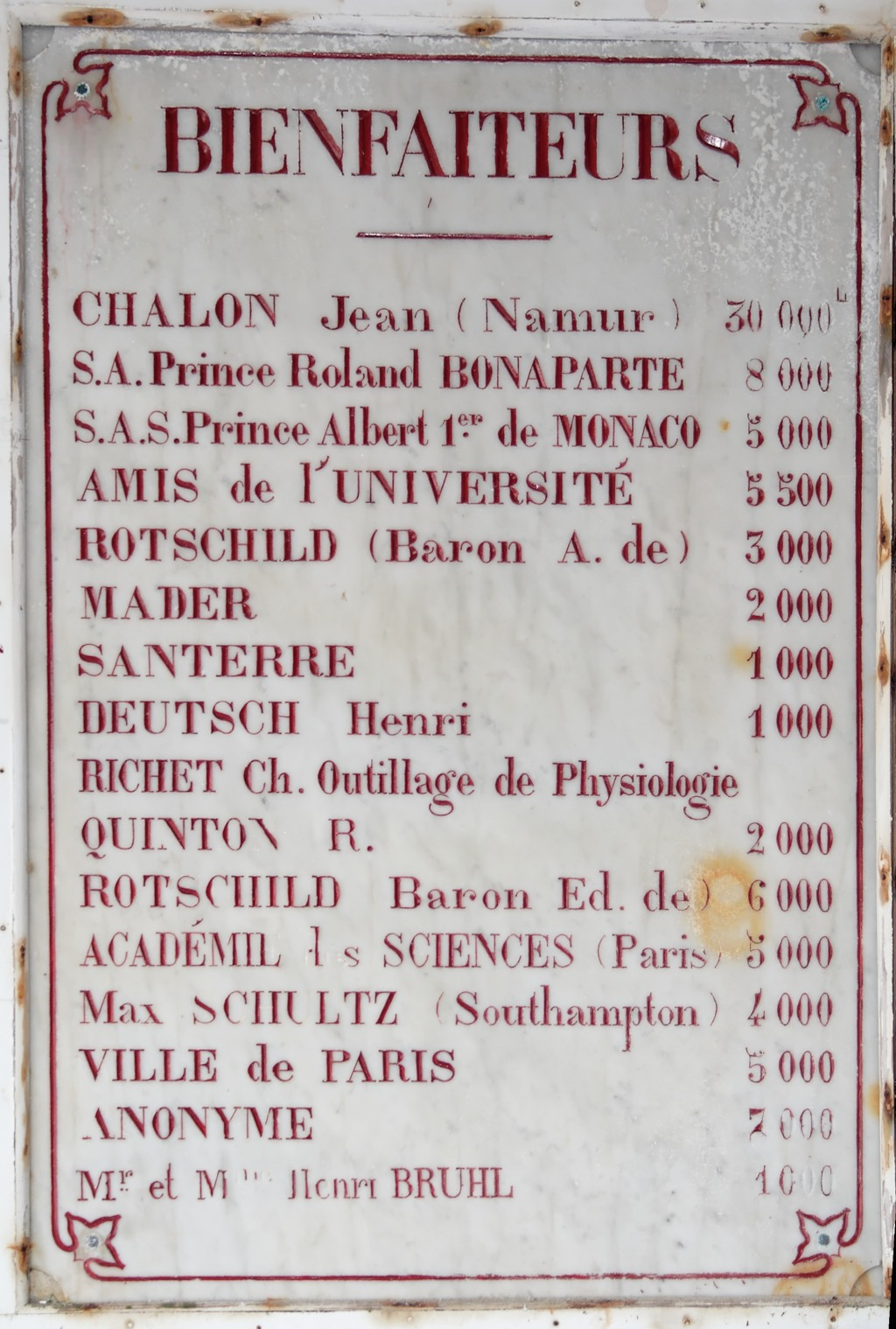
Early benefactors

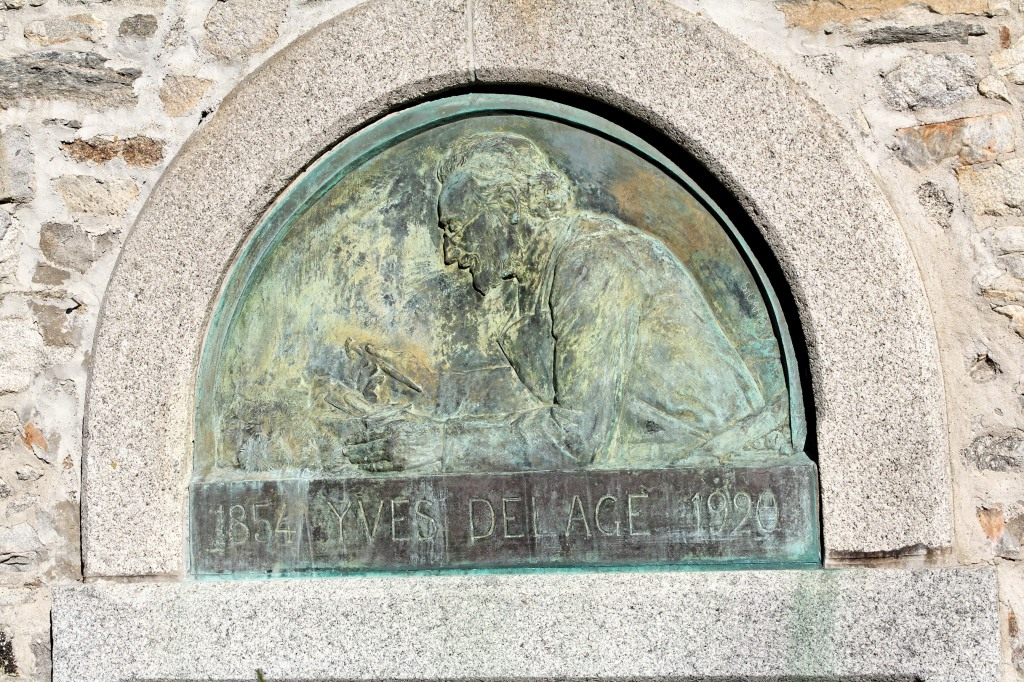
Sculpture of Yves Delage, director 1901–1921
