= Ethics: Origin and Development =

Philosophical book by russian anarchist Peter Kropotkin

- 1979 edition
- Author: Peter Kropotkin
- Subject: Moral philosophy
- Publisher: Dial Press (English translation)
- Publication date: 1921
- English publication date: 1924
- Pages: 349

Ethics: Origin and Development is a book by Peter Kropotkin, published posthumously in 1921. It continues the argument of Mutual Aid, that sociable morality is essential to human survival. It was translated into English by Louis S. Friedland and Joseph R. Piroshnikoff in 1924.
