= Bread and Freedom =

Russian anarcho-communist group

- Хлеб и Воля
- Nickname: Khlebovoltsy
- Predecessor: Group of Russian Anarchists Abroad
- Formation: 1903; 123 years ago
- Founders: Mendel Dainov; Georgy Gogelia; Lydia Gogelia
- Founded at: Geneva
- Purpose: Anarcho-communism

Bread and Freedom (Russian: Хлеб и Воля, romanized: Khleb i Volia) was a group of communist anarchists that had a great influence on the revolutionary movement in Russia.

== History ==
The forerunner of the "Bread and Freedom" group was the "Group of Russian Anarchists Abroad", founded in 1900 in Geneva by Russian anarchist emigrants. The organization called for the overthrow of the autocracy and social revolution. Its leaders were Mendel Dainov, Georgy and Lydia Gogelia.

In 1903 the Gogelia couple created a group of communist anarchists in Geneva called Bread and Freedom. The "Khlebovoltsy", with the support of Peter Kropotkin, M. I. Goldsmit and Varlam Cherkezishvili, managed in the same year to organize the publication of the first Russian anarchist printed organ abroad – the newspaper Bread and Freedom.

In 1904 and in the first months of the 1905 Russian Revolution almost all anarchist groups consisted of followers of the Khlebovoltsy theory of anarchist communism.

== Tactics ==
At the first congress in London (December 1904), the strategic and tactical tasks of the Khlebovoltsy in the revolution were outlined: "a social revolution, that is, the complete destruction of capitalism and the state and their replacement with anarchist communism." The beginning of the revolution was to be a general strike of the dispossessed in cities and villages. The main methods of the anarchist struggle in Russia should be "an uprising and direct attack, both mass and personal, on the oppressors and exploiters."

The form of anarchist organization was to be "voluntary agreement of individuals into groups and groups among themselves." The Khlebovoltsi categorically rejected the possibility of cooperation and the entry of anarchists into other revolutionary parties in Russia, as this would be contrary to anarchist principles. Therefore, at the congress, Kropotkin for the first time put forward the idea of the need to create a separate and independent anarchist party in Russia.

At the Second Congress in London ([17–18 September 1906), Kropotkin wrote a resolution that assessed and revealed the nature of the revolution, clarifying the tasks of the anarchists. The resolution expressed the sharply negative attitude of the anarchists to the possibility of working in institutions such as the State Duma and the Constituent Assembly. Of all the methods of revolutionary struggle, the anarchists preferred the immediate and destructive action of the masses. In the resolution "On Acts of Personal and Collective Protest" (by Vladimir Zabrezhnev), the congress participants confirmed the right of anarchists to commit terrorist acts only for the purpose of self-defense. At the same time, "ideological" anarchists rejected the role of terror as a means to change the existing system.

== Theoretical basis ==
The main principles of Khlebovoltsi:

- Any state is not only useless, but also harmful.
- Creation of an anti-state communist society.
- Societal transformation in the spirit of communism.
- The goals of anarchists can only be achieved with the help of a social revolution, which will completely destroy capitalism and the state system that supports it.
- Anarchists do not recognize any intermediate stages.
- A general strike in towns and villages, which should be the signal for the political and communist revolution.
- The unity of the anarchist movement must be achieved by uniting like-minded ideological groups that are free to part at any time if there is a disagreement.

== Future society ==
After the liberation from tsarism, the Khlebovaya saw a society created on the model of anarcho-communism: a union or federation of communes, united by free association. The individual will receive unlimited opportunities for development. The first task after the victory of the revolution, the anarcho-communists considered the expropriation of everything that served exploitation. They believed that the achieved maximum of individual freedom will lead to the maximum economic prosperity of society, since free labor will lead to an increase in productivity. Decentralized industry, direct product exchange, integration of labor, the combination of mental and physical labor, the introduction of a production and technical system of education and agrarian reforms of the ideal of Khlebovoltsy are described in Kropotkin's book The Conquest of Bread.

== See also ==
- Chernoe Znamia

== Bibliography ==
- Avrich, Paul (1971) [1967]. The Russian Anarchists. Princeton: Princeton University Press. ISBN 0-691-00766-7. OCLC 1154930946.
- Geifman, Anna (1993). Thou Shalt Kill. Princeton: Princeton University Press. ISBN 0-691-02549-5.
