= Giorgi Gogelia =

Georgian anarchist (1878–1924)

Georgy Gogelia
- გიორგი გოგელია
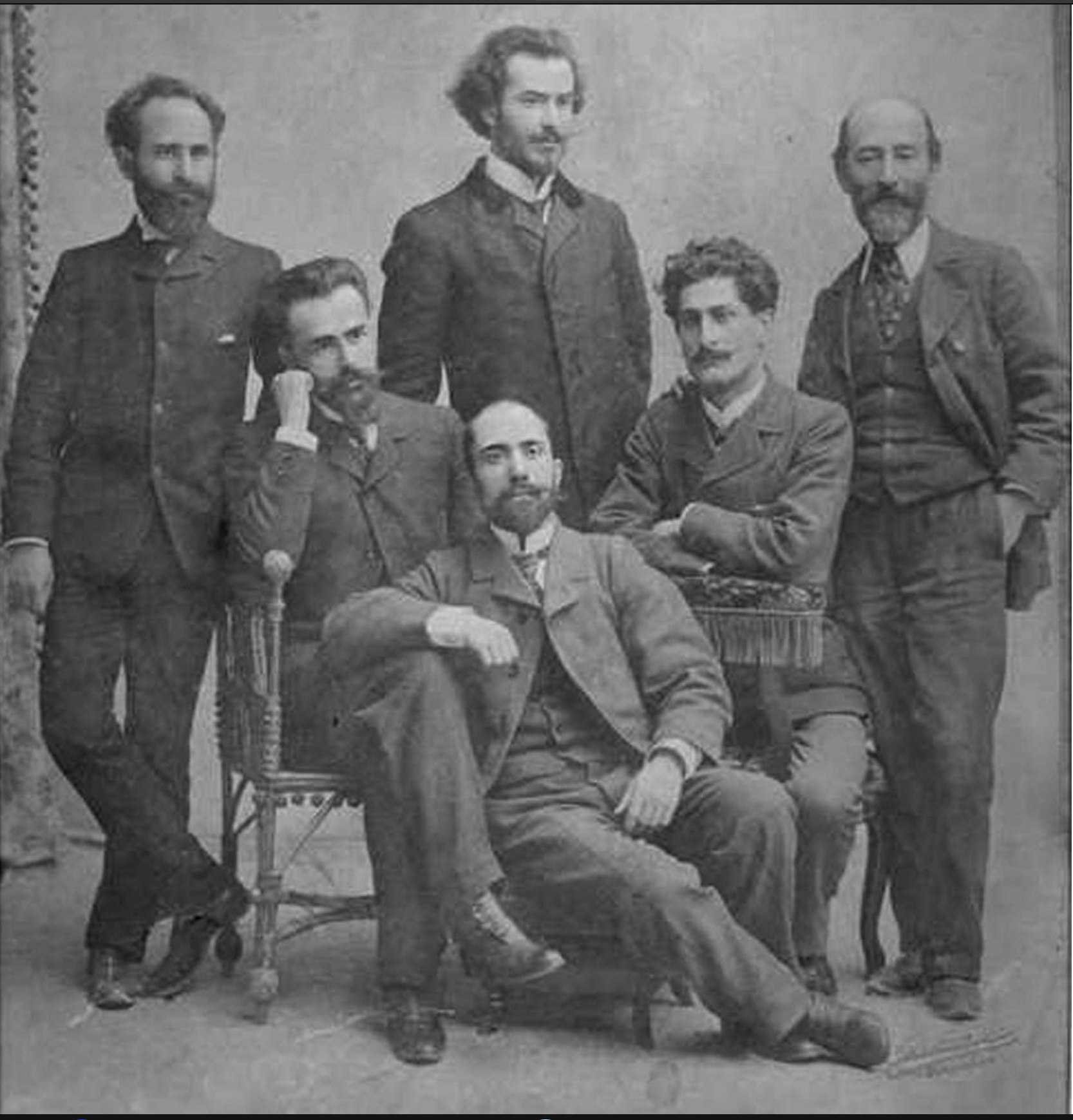
- Gogelia stands in the center of the photo
- Born: 6 September 1878; Ozurgeti, Georgia, Russian Empire
- Died: 21 December 1924 (aged 46); Tbilisi, Georgia, Soviet Union
- Other name: K. Orgeiani
- Spouse: Lydia Gogelia

Georgy Ilias dze Gogelia (Georgian: გიორგი ილიას ძე გოგელია; 1878–1924), also known by his pseudonym K. Orgeiani, was a Georgian revolutionary anarchist.

== Biography ==
In 1895 he graduated from the Ozurgeti Theological School, then the Kutaisi Theological Seminary. In 1897 he left for France and lived in Saint-Louis. He graduated from the Faculty of Agronomy at the Agronomic College of Nans, then studied in Lausanne, attended lectures in chemistry at the University of Geneva.

Abroad, Gogelia entered the revolutionary struggle, becoming a member of an organized group of Russian anarchists. Together with his wife, he edited the anarchist party organ "Bread and Freedom" in Geneva, in which active anarchists Pyotr Kropotkin, Varlam Cherkezishvili and Luigi Bertoni actively collaborated. From the time of the 1905 Russian Revolution, Gogelia was one of the most active figures among the anarchists, editing various magazines and newspapers, participating in meetings, discussions and lectures.

Arriving home during the 1905 revolution, he was engaged in revolutionary propaganda in Sukhumi and Tiflis. But soon he fled to Europe again - first to Switzerland and then to France. He published works by Cherkezishvili; The most important of these was "How and from what did revolutionary syndicalism develop?"

In the summer of 1914, Gogelia was diagnosed with "progressive tuberculosis". In 1921, Gogelia returned to Georgia. He lived first in Kutaisi, then in Kobuleti. He ended his life in a psychiatric hospital and was buried in the Didube Pantheon of writers and public figures.

== Literature ==
- ზ. ბაბუნაშვილი, თ. ნოზაძე, «მამულიშვილთა სავანე»,გვ. 106, თბ., 1994
- შველიძე დ., ენციკლოპედია «საქართველო», ტ. 2, გვ. 59–60, თბ., 2012 წელი.
